= List of armed groups in the Lebanese Civil War =

The list of militias in the Lebanese Civil War does not include the "legal" Lebanese Army; note that the Army split into two major parts:

- The Christian-led "legal" Lebanese Army favoured the Lebanese Front government
- The Muslim "Lebanese Arab Army" fought for the rival Lebanese National Movement government

In addition, there was an autonomous faction within the "legal" Lebanese Army called the Army of Free Lebanon. It formed in 1976 and was composed of Maronites and Greek-Catholics reacting against the split with the mainly Muslim Lebanese Arab Army. It continued to be paid by the government, and was fully re-integrated into the "legal" army in 1978, with the exception of some units which chose instead to form the South Lebanon Army listed below.

== List ==
=== Lebanese Front and other right-wing factions ===
Militia	Fighters	Time	Demographic	Notes
Lebanese Forces	10,000-15,000	1976-1990	Maronite	Initially an umbrella organization for Maronite party militias; became an independent power structure in the year 1992.
Army of Free Lebanon	3,000	1976-1978	Christian	Dissident faction of the Lebanese Army
Tyous Team of Commandos	100	1975-1985	Maronite	
Zahloite Group	500	1975-1978	Christian	Formed by a middle-class man against local feudal clans
Kataeb Regulatory Forces	10,000-15,000	1961-1984	Maronite	
Kataeb Security Sections	1,000	1976-1984	Maronite	The Kataeb party's "police militia". First commander was Bashir Gemayel
Vanguard of the Maani Army	200	1976-1978	Druze	
Maronite League	200	1952-current	Maronite	A military wing was formed in 1975 for the organization of Lebanese Christian Maronite notables
Young Men	100	1976-1986	Christian	Very loosely organised militia
Tigers Militia	3,500	1968-1980	Maronite	The organization was first aligned with the LF disbanded during the inter-Christian conflicts
Zgharta Liberation Army	2,400-3,500	1967-1991	Maronite	Operated around its power-base in northern Lebanon; pro-Syrian after 1978
Popular Revolutionary Resistance Organization Lebanese Liberation Front	Unknown	1987	Christian	Secretive underground party regarded as extremist. All names are believed to be the same organization.
Guardians of the Cedars	6,000	1975-1990	Maronite	Founder currently lives in exile
Lebanese Youth Movement	500-1,000	1975-1977	Maronite	Founded by right-wing Maronite university students.
Sons of the South	Unknown	1983-1995	Christian	Usually operated in the Jabal Amel region close to the Israeli-controlled 'Security Zone'
South Lebanon Army	5,000	1977-2000	Secular	Based itself in Saad Haddad's unrecognized State of Free Lebanon.
Assyrian Battalion	Unknown	1980	Assyrian	Very little is known about the militia
Al-Tanzim	1,500	1969-1990	Maronite	Secretive, was possibly linked to the Lebanese Army

=== LNM/LNRF and other left-wing factions ===
Militia	Fighters	Operation	Demographic	Notes
Lebanese Arab Army	4,400	1976-1977	Sunni	Broke away from Lebanese Army; considered itself the legitimate Lebanese Army and at highpoint controlled 3/4 of Lebanese Army positions
The-Assad Battalion	2,000	1953-1991	Sunni	Syrian Ba'ath group in Lebanon
Arab Communist Organization	Unknown	1969-1977	Secular	The group focused mainly on bomb attacks and extortion attempts targeting American and British civilian and economic interests in Lebanon
Arab Red Knights/Arab Cavalier Force	1,000-1,500	1981-1990	Alawite	Pro-Syrian; small but received very considerable support from Syria's Alawite leader; eventually controlled Tripoli harbour. Funded and trained by Rifat al Asaad. Military wing of the Arab Democratic Party.
Zafer el-Khatib Forces	200-500	1975-1991	Sunni	Established a close relationship with the Shia Amal Movement, Military wing of the Toilers League
Kurdish Democratic Party	Unknown	1985-1990	Kurdish	Joined forces with the Razkari Party to form the Progressive Kurdish Front
People's Liberation Army	17,000	1975-1994	Druze	Power base in the Chouf and controlled its own canton
Communist Action Organization in Lebanon	150-200	1973-1980s	Secular	
Lebanese Armed Revolutionary Factions	30	1979-1988	Secular	
Lebanese Resistance Regiments (AMAL)	16,000	1975-1991	Shi'a	Militia created with Fatah support
Islamic Unification Movement	1,000	1982-1991	Sunni	The militia had strong involvement in Tripoli and South Lebanon.
Islamic Jihad for the Liberation of Palestine	Unknown	1987	Shi'a	Claimed responsibility for the abduction of three American and one Indian professors from Beirut University College.
Islamic Resistance	5,000	1983-1991	Shi'a	Evolved from Amal in early 1980s, initially as Iranian proxy
Islamic Jihad Organization	400	1983-1992	Shi'a	Claimed responsibility for many attacks and kidnapping against the United States
Islamic Amal	Unknown	1982-1987	Shi'a	The movement got its start in June 1982 when Nabih Berri, the head of Amal, agreed to participate in the Salvation Committee
National Liberation Army	500-1000	1975-1980s	Sunni	The military wing of the Popular Nasserist Organization
Sixth of February Movement	150	1975-1986	Sunni	Trained by the Palestine Liberation Organization.
Arab Socialist Action Party – Lebanon	Unknown	1969-1980s	Secular	The party was founded by George Habash in 1969 and was closely linked to the PFLP, which Habash also led.
Najjadeh Party	100	1975-1976	Secular	A party which emerged during the French era.
Popular Guard	5,000	1970-1990	Secular	Secular, but most members nominally from Eastern Orthodox & Oriental Orthodox communities
Lebanese Forces – Executive Command	1,000	1986-1991	Christian	A splinter group from the Lebanese Forces led by Elie Hobeika based in Zahle
Free Tigers	200	1980-1981	Christian	Dissident splinter group of the NLP Tigers after the forced merger with the Lebanese Front
SSNP militia	10,000	1975-1990	Secular	Advocated union with Syria; 1976 split into pro- and anti-Assad factions members linked to assassinations of Jumblatt and Gemayel
Nasser's Forces	Unknown	1975-1990	Sunni	The party and its military wing were supported financially and militarily by the Libyan government.
Nasserist Unionists Movement	Unknown	1982-1991	Sunni	Splinter faction of the INM/Al-Mourabitoun
Al-Mourabitoun	3,000	1975-1985	Sunni	
Victory Divisions	1,000	1975-1978	Muslim	Pro-Syrian, military wing of the Union of Working People's Forces
Ba'ath militias	Unknown	1975-1990	Secular	Split into two rival Ba'ath militias, one pro-Iraqi, the other pro-Syrian
Socialist Arab Lebanon Vanguard Party	2500	1966-1991	secular	Iraqi Ba'ath group in Lebanon
Lebanese Movement in Support of Fatah	Unknown	Unknown	Sunni	LMSF received Fatah backing from the outset and joined the ranks of the Lebanese National Movement (LNM)
United Nasserite Organization	50-100	1986-1991	Sunni	Suspected to be merely a cover for the National Revolutionary Command (Omar al-Mukhtar)

=== Unaffiliated groups ===
Militia	Fighters	Operation	Demographic	Notes
Lebanese Armed Forces	50,000	1945-current	Secular	Had numerous splinter groups and different leaderships throughout the war
Front for the Liberation of Lebanon from Foreigners	Unknown	1980s	Secular	Obscure underground militant organization covertly formed by Mossad, (Israel) in Lebanon in the early 1980s to undermine Palestinian and Syrian forces
Soldiers of the Right	Unknown	1988-1989	Muslim	An unknown underground group which claimed responsibility for multiple kidnappings and murders in Europe and Lebanon
Liberation Battalion	Unknown	1987-1988	Secular	Organization dedicated to attacking Syrian Army in Lebanon during the 1980s. Suspected to have relations to both LF and Hezbollah
M.U.R.	Unknown	1991-1994	Secular	liberation armed group fighting Lebanon's occupation by foreign armies in the 1990s
Razkari Party	Unknown	1975-current	Kurdish	

=== Foreign groups ===
Militia	Fighters	Operation	Notes
Palestinian
Abu Nidal Organization	Unknown	1974-1997	A breakaway from Fatah led by Abu Nidal
Fatah	7000	1965-present	Fatah became the dominant force in Palestinian politics after the Six-Day War in 1967.
Fatah al-Intifada	3500	1983–present	Splinter group of Fatah
PLFP-GC	2000	1968-present	Syrian-backed splinter group from the Popular Front for the Liberation of Palestine
PFLP	2000	1967–present	After the Six-Day War of June 1967
PNSF	Unknown	1985-1991	Mostly participated in the War of the Camps
PPSP	200	1967–present	Supported by Syria and Libya
As-Sa'iqa	4500	1966–present	Used by Syria as a proxy force in the Palestinian movement
Revolutionary Palestinian Communist Party	Unknown	1982–present	Took part in the armed resistance against the Israeli invasion in Lebanon
DFLP	2500	1968–present	
Armenian
Armenian Revolutionary Federation	Unknown	1975-1991	ARF affiliates took arms to defend their neighbourhoods
ASALA	Unknown	1975-1991	Committed many terrorist attacks internationally
Justice Commandos of the Armenian Genocide	Unknown	1975-1987	Committed many murders during the war both in Lebanon and internationally. Military wing of the Armenian Revolutionary Federation
Other
Japanese Red Army	40	1971–2001	The JRA had close ties with the Popular Front for the Liberation of Palestine (PFLP) and Wadie Haddad.
Jihadi Wing	2000+	1979-2003	Responsible for the Iraqi embassy bombing in Beirut
Kurdistan Workers' Party	Unknown	1980-1984	Was involved in attacks against Israel after their expulsion from Turkey and relocation to the Beqaa Valley.
State militaries
Islamic Revolutionary Guard Corps	20000+	1982	The IRGC allegedly sent troops to train fighters in response to the 1982 Israeli invasion of Lebanon.
Israel	78000	1978-2000	Funded right-wing militia groups throughout the war. Invaded Lebanon in 1978 and in 1982.
Saudi Arabia	3200	1976-1979	Part of the Arab Deterrent Force
Sudan	1000	1976-1979	Part of the Arab Deterrent Force
United Arab Emirates	1500	1976-1979	Part of the Arab Deterrent Force
Libya	2000	1976	Part of the Arab Deterrent Force and state funder of leftist militias
South Yemen	1000	1976-1977	Part of the Arab Deterrent Force
Syria	35000	1976-1991	Invaded Lebanon in 1976, part of the Arab Deterrent Force

== See also ==
- Lebanese Armed Forces
- Lebanese Civil War
- List of armed groups in the Syrian Civil War
- List of weapons of the Lebanese Civil War
