= List of wars involving Syria =

This is a list of wars involving Syria since independence, including periods of the Arab Kingdom of Syria (1920), Mandatory Syrian Republic (1930–1946), Second Syrian Republic (1946–1958, 1961–1963), United Arab Republic (1958–1961), Ba'athist Syria (1963–2024), and Syria (2024–present).

Conflict	Syria and allies	Opponents	Outcome	Head of State
Franco-Syrian War (1920)	Arab Kingdom of Syria: (Kingdom of Hejaz) Arab militias	France: Lebanon; (French Third Republic) West Africa	French victory: Establishment of French Syria; King Faisal expelled to Iraq; Dissolution of the Arab Kingdom of Syria	King Faisal
Great Syrian Revolt (1925–1927)	Syrian rebels: Sunnis; Druze; Alawites	France: Syria; Lebanon	French victory: Revolt crushed	None
Syria–Lebanon Campaign (1941)	Vichy France: Syria; Lebanon	United KingdomFree France	Allied Victory: Defeat of Vichy France in Syria; Syria and Lebanon taken over by Free France	Khalid al-Azm (Acting)
Levant Crisis (1945)	United Kingdom; Syria	France	Victory: British-enforced ceasefire; French withdrawal from the Levant; Syria and Lebanon gain full independence	Shukri al-Quwatli
First Arab–Israeli War (1948–1949)	Arab League: Egypt; All-Palestine Protectorate (Note: After 22 September 1948); Holy War Army; Transjordan; Iraq; Syria; Lebanon (Note: Lebanon had decided to not participate in the war and only took part in the battle of al-Malikiya on 5–6 June 1948.); Saudi Arabia; Yemen Irregulars: Arab Liberation Army; Al-Najjada; Holy War Army	Israel Before 26 May 1948: (Israel) Yishuv; Paramilitary groups: Haganah; Palmach; Hish; Him; Irgun; Lehi; Allied Bedouin tribes After 26 May 1948: Israel Defense Forces; Minorities Unit; Foreign volunteers: Mahal	Defeat: Establishment of the State of Israel, Jordanian annexation of the West Bank, Egyptian occupation of the Gaza Strip; 1948 Palestinian expulsion and flight; Beginning of the Palestinian Fedayeen insurgency	Shukri al-Quwatli
First Iraqi–Kurdish War (1963–1970)	Before 1968: Iraq; Syria (1963); Supported by: United States (from 1963) After 1968: Ba'athist Iraq	KDP; Supported by: Iran; Israel; United States (alleged)	Military stalemate: Several Iraqi offensives intended to suppress the Kurdish rebellion fail; Iraqi–Kurdish Autonomy Agreement; Arabization program continued; Second Iraqi–Kurdish War in 1974	Lu'ay al-Atassi
Six-Day War (1967)	Egypt; Syria; Jordan; Iraq; Minor involvement: Lebanon	Israel	Israeli victory: Israel occupies a total of 70,000 km^{2} (27,000 sq mi) of territory: The Golan Heights from Syria; The West Bank including East Jerusalem from Jordan; The Gaza Strip and the Sinai Peninsula from Egypt	Nureddin al-Atassi
Syrian invasion of Jordan (1970)	Syria; PLO: Fatah; Popular Front for the Liberation of Palestine (PFLP); Democratic Front for the Liberation of Palestine (DFLP)	Jordan	Jordanian victory	Nureddin al-Atassi
October War (1973)	Egypt; Syria; Expeditionary forces Saudi Arabia Algeria Jordan Libya Iraq Kuwait Tunisia Morocco Cuba North Korea	Israel	Defeat: At the final ceasefire: Egyptian forces held 1,200 km^{2} (460 sq mi) on the eastern bank of the canal.; Israeli forces held 1,600 km^{2} (620 sq mi) on the western bank of the canal.; Israeli forces held 500 km^{2} (193 sq mi) of the Syrian Bashan region of the Golan Heights.	Hafez al-Assad
Lebanese Civil War (1975–1990) (Note: The last battle took place from 2–6 July 1991 between the Lebanese government and the Palestine Liberation Organization due to the latter's refusal to accept the Taif Agreement.)	Syria (1976, 1983–1991); Amal Movement; PNSF; Marada Brigades (left LF in 1978; aligned with Syria)	Lebanese Front: Kataeb Party; Lebanese Forces; Marada Brigades (until 1978) Guardians of the Cedars Al-Tanzim Lebanese Youth Movement (MKG) Tyous Team of Commandos Zahliote Group Shuraya Party Vanguard of the Maani Army (MDJ) (Other minor organizations); Army of Free Lebanon (until 1977); SLA (from 1976); Israel (from 1978) Tigers Militia (until 1980) Lebanese National Movement (1975–1982) Jammoul (1982–1990): Al-Mourabitoun; Progressive Socialist Party (PSP); Lebanese Communist Party (LCP); Syrian Social Nationalist Party in Lebanon (SSNP); Communist Action Organization in Lebanon (OCAL); Lebanese Movement in Support of Fatah (LMSF); Arab Socialist Ba'ath Party – Lebanon Region; Revolutionary Communist Group; Sixth of February Movement; Socialist Arab Lebanon Vanguard Party (SALVP) Popular Nasserist Organization (PNO) Lebanese Arab Army (LAA) Other minor organizations; PLO (1975–1983); ASALA Hezbollah (1985–1990); Iran (from 1980, mainly IRGC and Army paramilitary units) Islamic Unification Movement (from 1982) Lebanese Armed Forces UNIFIL (from 1978); Multinational Force in Lebanon (1982–1984): United States; UK; France; Italy; Arab Deterrent Force (1976–1982) List: Saudi Arabia (1976–1979); Sudan (1976–1979); UAE (1976–1979); Libya (1976 only); South Yemen (1976–1977)	Victory: Taif Agreement; Christian-to-Muslim representation in Parliament of Lebanon adjusted from ratio of 55:45 to 50:50; Political powers of Muslim-reserved position of Prime Minister strengthened over Christian-reserved position of President; Disarmament of all Lebanese and non-Lebanese militias, excluding Iran-backed Hezbollah; Continued hostilities between Lebanon and the Palestine Liberation Organization (PLO), and PLO expulsion to Tunis, Tunisia in 1982.; Expulsion of Palestinian militias from Lebanon after the Battle of Sidon in 1991; Collapse of the Israel-backed State of Free Lebanon in 1984 and of Israel's South Lebanon security belt administration in 2000; Continued fighting between Israel and Hezbollah in the Shebaa Farms conflict, eventually leading to the 2006 Lebanon War; Dominance of Hezbollah armed strength across Lebanon since 1990; Syria occupies northern/eastern Lebanon until 30 April 2005; Israel occupies southern Lebanon until 25 May 2000	Hafez al-Assad
Islamist uprising in Syria (1979–1982)	Syria; Supported by: Soviet Union	Fighting Vanguard; Muslim Brotherhood (after mid-1979); Pro-Iraqi Ba'athists; Supported by: Iraq (1980–1982); Jordan; West Germany	Syrian government victory: Uprising suppressed; Muslim Brotherhood outlawed	Hafez al-Assad
Gulf War (1990–1991)	United States; United Kingdom; France; Saudi Arabia; Egypt; Kuwait; (United Nations) Coalition: Afghan mujahideen; Argentina; Australia; Bahrain; Bangladesh; Belgium; Canada; Czechoslovakia; Denmark; Germany; Greece; Honduras; Hungary; Italy; Japan; Luxembourg; Morocco; Netherlands; New Zealand; Niger; Norway; Oman; Pakistan; Philippines; Poland; Portugal; Qatar; Romania; Senegal; Sierra Leone; Singapore; South Korea; Spain; Sweden; Syria; Turkey; United Arab Emirates	Iraq	Coalition victory: State of Kuwait resumes self-governance over all Kuwaiti sovereign territory; Establishment of a demilitarized zone and construction of a separation barrier along the Iraq–Kuwait border	Hafez al-Assad
Syrian civil war (2011–2024)	Syria; Iraq (2017–19); Russia; Hezbollah; Iran	Syrian Opposition; Turkey Ahrar al-Sham Tahrir al-Sham ISIL Northern Syria; CJTF–OIR: United States; Canada; United Kingdom; France; Germany; Saudi Arabia; Qatar; Jordan; Bahrain; United Arab Emirates; Morocco; Australia; Netherlands; Belgium; Denmark; Norway	Syrian opposition and allied victory: The Assad regime is overthrown; Internal conflict continues	Bashar al-Assad
Aftermath of the Syrian civil war (2024–present)	Syria Northern Syria	(Ba'athist Syria) Assad loyalists and Neo-Ba'athist insurgents Hezbollah Israel; Druze militias ISIL	Ongoing: Israeli intervention against the Ba'athist remnants and the Syrian government; Clashes between the Assad loyalists and Hezbollah against the Syrian government along with spillovers near the Lebanese border	Ahmed al-Sharaa

== See also ==
- Syrian Crisis of 1957
- Military history of Syria

== Sources ==
- Conduit, Dara (2019). The Muslim Brotherhood in Syria. Cambridge University Press. ISBN 978-1-108-49977-4.
- Lefèvre, Raphaël (2013). Ashes of Hama: The Muslim Brotherhood in Syria. Oxford University Press. ISBN 978-0-19-933062-1.
