= Front for the Liberation of Lebanon from Foreigners =

Israeli-backed terrorist organization based in Lebanon

- جبهة تحرير لبنان من الغرباء
- Other name: Front pour la Libération du Liban des Étrangers
- Dates active: 1979–1983
- Country: Lebanon

The Front for the Liberation of Lebanon from Foreigners (FLLF) (Arabic: جبهة تحرير لبنان من الغرباء, romanized: Jabhat Tahrir Lubnan min al-Ghuraba'), or Front pour la Libération du Liban des Étrangers (FLLE) in French, was a formerly Israeli-backed obscure underground organization that surfaced in Lebanon at the early 1980s.

According to Ronen Bergman, the front was a "terrorist organization that Israel ran in Lebanon in the years 1980–83" which was set up on the orders of Israel Defense Forces Chief of Staff Rafael Eitan, who instructed Israeli General Avigdor Ben-Gal, together with Meir Dagan, to create and oversee the group in the wake of the 1979 Nahariya attack.

== Activities (1979–1983) ==
Coinciding with an Israeli aerial bombing campaign of PLO centers in Lebanon, the group made its début in July 1981 with a series of car bombings that reached a peak later in September as they unleash a spate of attacks that created havoc in the Muslim quarters of Sidon, Tripoli, Chekka and West Beirut until February 1982. In the latter case, the car bombs were combined with a powerful command-detonated explosive device planted at a packed cinema which it took responsibility on 1 October 1981 with a phone call to the French newspaper, L'Orient-Le Jour.

- 17 September 1981: At around 9 am, a vehicle booby-trapped with 300 kilograms of TNT detonated directly in front of the regional headquarters of the PLO and the Lebanese Joint Forces in the southern port city of Sidon. The car exploded 15 minutes before a scheduled meeting of Palestinian and Lebanese militants, killing 21–23 people mostly civilians and wounding 96. Four of those killed were militants.
- 17 September 1981: A bomb outside a cement factory in Chekka in the north, frequented by people with pro-Palestinian and pro-Syrian views. Estimates of those killed run from 4 to 10. 8 to 10 others were reported wounded.
- 18 September 1981: A car bomb in Beirut's southern low-income suburb of Hayy al-Salloum, populated by many Shiite refugees from the south, left 3 dead and 3–4 wounded; The Lebanese police suggested that bomb may have exploded before the car reached its real target.
- 2 October 1981: 9:55 am, a Peugeot car packed with over 100 pounds of explosives was detonated outside the Palestine Liberation Organization (PLO) offices in the Fakhani neighbourhood in West Beirut, where Abu Jihad worked. At least 50 people were reportedly killed and more than 250 wounded. Other attacks undertaken that same month targeted Syrian troops of the Arab Deterrent Force.

FLLF operations came to a sudden halt just prior to the June 1982 Israeli invasion of Lebanon, only to be resumed the following year with four huge car bomb attacks: the first one on 28 January 1983 struck a PLO headquarters at Chtaura in the Syrian-controlled Beqaa Valley, killing 40.

On 6 February 1983, shortly before 2 pm., a car bomb exploded and devastated the Palestine Research Center offices in West Beirut, leaving 18–20 people dead and at least 115 wounded. Among the victims was the wife of Sabri Jiryis. A third bombing occurred on Syrian-controlled Baalbek on 7 August 1983, which killed about 30 people and injured nearly 40, followed by another on 5 December 1983 at the Chyah quarter of the Southern suburbs of Beirut that claimed the lives of 12 people and maimed over 80. The group ceased its actions shortly afterwards, though some observers believe that they remained active as late as mid-1984.

=== Attempted assassination of John Gunther Dean ===
Henry Kissinger had Gerald Ford authorize contacts with the PLO to secure the safety of the US Embassy and American citizens in Lebanon, a role the PLO subsequently agreed to take on. Coordination between US intelligence and the PLO became extensive in the following years during ambassadorship of Richard Parker. This arrangement violated the terms of an earlier 1975 Memorandum of Agreement with Israel, yet continued when American diplomat John Gunther Dean took over from Parker in 1978, and covered an even wider spectrum of regional issues. When Israel discovered the cooperation, Mossad argued that it was necessary to "cut the channel" between the US and the PLO. To that end, it first dispatched a team of agents to assassinate the PLO figure, Abu Hassan Salameh, who acted as the key intelligence intermediary for these exchanges with the US.

On 27 August 1980, an attempt was made on the lives of the US Ambassador to Lebanon, Dean and his family. Dean, of Ashkenazi descent, had been authorized to deal with the PLO when American Security Interests were involved, something which disturbed Israel. (Note: "On the assassination of Arafat's personal assistant, Abu Hassan, in early 1979, Ambassador Dean was told by the Lebanese intelligence service that three Mossad officers, bearing Belgian and Australian passports, had come to Beirut masquerading as tourists for the purpose of killing Abu Hassan, whose greatest 'drawback', in Dean's opinion, was that he was close to the Americans." (Killgore 2002, p. 15)) At Dean's request – he had sought counsel from Walid Khalidi – Yasser Arafat and Abu Walid, (Note: Abu Jihad according to Killgore (Killgore 2002, p. 15)) chief commanders of the PLO forces in Lebanon, had intervened by traveling to Tehran in November 1979, to secure the release of 13 Americans taken hostage in Iran in 1979. The PLO's decisive role was never publicly acknowledged by the US administration. (Note: "Whatever Khomeini's true motives, U.S. officials were obliged – if only behind closed doors – to acknowledge the PLO's hand in producing the encouraging result. In an oral message to Arafat, which had to pass through two other mouths before reaching the chairman's ears, Vance said he 'appreciate(d) the role the PLO played to bring about the release of the thirteen hostages'. Brzezinski privately noted that the PLO 'had been decisive' on the matter. Administration officials did not make such statements in public." (Yaqub 2016, p. 323)) Dean was known to send cables regularly to Israel and the State Department protesting IAF violations of Lebanese airspace. He had, in the face of Israeli objections, (Note: His predecessor Parker had failed to get Washington to overrule what Dean called Israeli interference in Southern Lebanon, and its objections to the presence of the Lebanese army there. Shortly afterwards, Parker was transferred (Dean n.d., pp. 217–218).) seconded the Lebanese government's movement of two of its battalions to Southern Lebanon, in order to assert Lebanese sovereignty. Dean later provided a detailed eyewitness account of the episode and its aftermath to both the Jimmy Carter Library and Museum and the ADST Foreign Affairs Oral History Project.

Dean always informed all parties, including the Israelis, of his movements. According to his reconstruction of events, the motorcade taking Dean and his family from his hilltrop retreat in Yarze back to Beirut around 7 pm on 27 August was ambushed and struck with a fusillade of 21 shots, while Dean's limousine was also hit by two light anti-tank grenades. The first car in which his daughter and son-in-law were seated was completely destroyed, but not before they managed to run and leap into the third security car. Under return fire, the assassins abandoned their weapons and fled. The Lebanese chief of intelligence, Johnny Abdo conducted a thorough investigation of the arms left behind, ascertaining their markings and numbers. After communicating the data to Washington, and waiting 3 weeks, he was informed of the date of purchase, the buyer's name, and when the cargo was shipped to Israel in 1974. (Note: "I was the target of an assassination attempt by terrorists using automatic rifles and antitank weapons that had been made in the United States and shipped to Israel." (Crossette 2009)) The FLLF later claimed responsibility for this attempted assassination. Dean thought that there was no doubt Israel lay behind the attempt on his life. (Note: "Undoubtedly, using a proxy, our ally Israel had tried to kill me." (Dean 2009, p. 134)) Israel's role in creating the FLLP and furnishing it with arms and explosives was later acknowledged by Israeli intelligence officials. (Note: "Dean was the target of an assassination attempt in 1980. The Front for the Liberation of Lebanon from Foreigners claimed responsibility, but this group was later identified in interviews with Israeli intelligence sources as an Israeli-controlled operation. Dean always maintained that Israel was behind the attempt to kill him, and this evidence, in addition to Israel's assassination of several Palestinians involved in contacts with the United States, appears to bear out Dean's claim." (Khalidi 2020)) On being informed of the results of the investigation, the then U.S. Ambassador to Israel, Samuel W. Lewis raised the matter with the Israeli government.

Some sources state that the accusation in Dean's eyewitness account is unproven to this day, or that the very notion that Israelis would target an American Ambassador is "unconceivable". Dean recalled the incident as "one of the more unsavory episodes in our Middle Eastern history."

=== List of incidents, claimed or attributed ===
According to Lee O'Brien writing for Merip the pattern of these "internal" car bombings overlapped with specific areas targeted later by Israel in its invasion. (Note: "The car bombs appear to be an integral part of the larger Israeli-Phalangist campaign to transform Lebanon. The main targets of the 'internal bombs' later became the main targets of Israeli F-15s and artillery in the summer of 1982. The names are familiar: Sidon, Ouzai, Shiyah, Barbir, Raouche, Hayy al-Salloum, the Arab University (which is only a few blocks from Fakhani, where many Palestinian and nationalist organizations were headquartered). Car bombs fit into the Israeli tactic of 'softening up' an area before a main battle." (O'Brien 1983))

Terrorist incidents attributed to the Front for the Liberation of Lebanon from Foreigners
| date | country | location | fatalities | injured | target type |
|---|---|---|---|---|---|
| 29 January 1981 | France | Paris | 1 | 8 | Government (Diplomatic) |
| 27 August 1981 | Lebanon | Beirut | 0 | 0 | Government (Diplomatic) |
| 17 September 1981 | Lebanon | Shika | 10 | 10 | Business |
| 17 September 1981 | Lebanon | Sidon | 23 | 90 | Non-state militia |
| 20 September 1981 | Lebanon | Beirut | 4 | 28 | Business |
| 28 September 1981 | Lebanon | Unknown | 18 | 45 | Non-state militia |
| 1 October 1981 | Lebanon | Beirut | 47+ | 255+ | PLO office |
| 2 October 1981 | Lebanon | Nabatiyeh | 0 | 0 | Educational Institution |
| 29 November 1981 | Syria | Damascus | 64 | 135 | Private Citizens/Property |
| 27 February 1982 | Lebanon | Beirut | 8 | 35 | Military |
| 21 May 1982 | Lebanon | Beirut | 3 | 10 | Business |
| 21 May 1982 | Lebanon | Beirut | 0 | 0 | Business |
| 21 May 1982 | Lebanon | Beirut | 0 | 1 | Private Citizens/Property |
| 28 January 1983 | Lebanon | Chtaura | 12 | 20 | Private Citizens/Property |
| 7 August 1983 | Lebanon | Baalbek | 35 | 133 | Private Citizens/Property |

== Disclosure of Israel's role by Ronen Bergman ==
The PLO Chairman Yasser Arafat suspected that the Israeli intelligence services was orchestrating the bombings claimed by the FLLF during the fall of 1981. The fact that Israel was behind the formation of the FLLF emerged in the early 1980s when an officer who had served with one of its coordinators, Meir Dagan, was shocked by the operations undertaken by the group and made an anonymous complaint. After rumour of his views reached the press – though publication was forbidden by the military censor – Menachem Begin ordered an investigation. An undisclosed officer chosen by Yehoshua Sagi determined that the gravamen of the complaint – that Eitan together with the head of Israel's northern command, Ben-Gal, Shlomo Ilya, an intelligence officer, and Dagan had deceived the government by hiding Israel's role in FLLF operations – was true.

The FLLF was set up in 1979 (Note: According to Lee O'Brien, the FLLF had claimed responsibility for several random terror attacks going back to 1977 and at the time, "It was popularly assumed to be a cover for the Phalangists, elements of the army's Deuxieme Bureau and Israeli intelligence." (O'Brien 1983)) in the wake of the massacre of an Israeli family at Nahariya by militants belonging to the Palestinian Liberation Front (PLF). To that end, Maronite Christian, Shiite and Druze operatives were recruited in 1979. The operations which it carried out against the Palestine Liberation Organization in Lebanon were coordinated by Meir Dagan, reportedly without informing the IDF, the Israeli Defense Ministry, the Israeli government and its various defense agencies. (Note: "The operation ran almost entirely without the authorization or knowledge of the rest of the military, the defense ministry, the intelligence agencies or the government." (Bergman 2018a)) David Agmon, at the time head of Israel's northern command, was one of the few people who were briefed on its operations. The aim of the series of operations was to:

cause chaos among the Palestinians and Syrians in Lebanon, without leaving an Israeli fingerprint, to give them the feeling that they were constantly under attack and to instill them with a sense of insecurity.

Dagan had a reputation for ruthlessness, with rumours circulating he had engaged in operations involving techniques like car bombings and poisoning. Two journalists from Yediot Ahronot investigated a story purporting that he ran a secret unit in Lebanon whose mission was to instigate terrorist events that would justify an incursion. The military censor suppressed publication of the article and, in 2012, Dagan denied the "thrust of the story". (Note: "Far from everything is known about Dagan's career. Two reporters for Yediot Ahronot, Yigal Sarna and Anat Tal-Shir, once investigated a story that, before Israel's 1982 invasion of Lebanon, which was aimed at rooting out Yasir Arafat and the Palestine Liberation Organization, Dagan led a secret unit across the border whose mission was to instigate terrorist events that would justify an incursion. Military censors killed the story, Sarna told me. Dagan acknowledges the censorship but denies the thrust of the story." (Remnick 2012)) However, some years later, Avigdor Ben-Gal supplied details on the operation to Ronen Bergman, an Israeli investigative journalist and authority on Israeli military intelligence, in which Dagan was mentioned as a key operative. According to Bergman, both Dagan and Ben-Gal later denied any intention of hitting civilian targets.

Bergman also argued that the explosives used in operations were drawn from material conserved by an IDF bomb disposal unit from the spoils of war with the enemy – rockets, grenades and mines – in order to minimize the chance of their being traced back to Israel if they were discovered. The explosives were then hidden in oil cans and tins for preserves built at a metal shop in Ben-Gal's former kibbutz, Mahanayim. There, the drums were carried over the border into Lebanon by couriers, or, if the consignments were too large, on motorcycles, bicycles, or donkeys.

== See also ==
- List of extrajudicial killings and political violence in Lebanon
- Guardians of the Cedars
- Israel and state-sponsored terrorism
- Lebanese Civil War
- Lebanese Forces (militia)
- Lebanese Liberation Front
- Liberation Battalion
- List of weapons of the Lebanese Civil War
- Sons of the South
- Popular Revolutionary Resistance Organization
- Rise and Kill First

== Sources ==
- Al-Shawaf, Rayyan (30 November 2021). "State of Terror". The Malcolm H. Kerr Carnegie Middle East Center.
- Bergman, Ronen (2018b). Rise and Kill First: The Secret History of Israel's Targeted Assassinations. Random House. ISBN 978-1-400-06971-2.
- Bergman, Ronen (23 January 2018a). "How Arafat Eluded Israel's Assassination Machine". The New York Times Magazine.
- Bird, Kai (2014). The Good Spy: The Life and Death of Robert Ames. Crown Books. ISBN 978-0-307-88977-5.
- Boustany, Nora (19 September 1981). "Shadowy Group Claims Responsibility for 3rd Blast in Lebanon". The Washington Post.
- Brulin, Rémi (7 May 2018). "The remarkable disappearing act of Israel's car-bombing campaign in Lebanon or: What we (do not) talk about when we talk about 'terrorism': A Case Study in the Role of Silences in the Construction of "Terrorism"". Mondoweiss.
- Brynen, Rex (1990). Sanctuary and Survival: the PLO in Lebanon. Westview Press. ISBN 978-0-813-37919-7.
- Crossette, Barbara (31 March 2009). "US Envoy Writes of Israeli Threats". The Nation.
- "Database of Worldwide Terrorism Incidents". Rand Corporation.
- Dean, John Gunther. "John Gunther Dean's testimony: Lebanon" (PDF). Jimmy Carter Library and Museum.
- Dean, John Gunther (2009). Danger Zones: A Diplomat's Fight for American Interests. New Academia Publishing/Vellum. ISBN 978-0-982-38670-5.
- Dean, John Gunther; Kennedy, Charles Stuart (2004). "Interview with Ambassador John Gunther Dean 6 September 2000" (PDF). ADST Foreign Affairs Oral History. Archived from the original (PDF) on 14 October 2021.
- Denton, Herbert H. (6 February 1983). "18 Die as Car Bomb Hits PLO Beirut Office". The Washington Post.
- Fisk, Robert (2001). Pity the Nation: Lebanon at War (3rd ed.). Oxford University Press. ISBN 978-0-192-80130-2.
- Friedman, Thomas (6 February 1983). "18 die in bombings at P.L.O.'s Center in Western Beirut". The New York Times.
- Khalidi, Rashid (2013). Brokers of Deceit: How the U.S. Has Undermined Peace in the Middle East. Beacon Press. ISBN 978-0-807-04476-6.
- Khalidi, Rashid (2020). The Hundred Years' War on Palestine: A History of Settler Colonialism and Resistance, 1917–2017. Metropolitan Books. ISBN 978-1-627-79854-9.
- Kifner, John (18 September 1981a). "20 Die in Lebanon in Antileft Bomb". The New York Times.
- Kifner, John (19 September 1981b). "Another Car Bomb explodes in Beirut, killing 3". The New York Times.
- Kifner, John (2 October 1981c). "Bomb at P.L.O Office Kills at least 50". The New York Times.
- Killgore, Andrew I. (November 2002). "American Ambassador Recalls Israeli Assassination Attempt—With U.S. Weapons". Washington Report on Middle East Affairs.
- Malsagne, Stéphane; De Clerck, Dima (2020). Le Liban en guerre (1975–1990) (in French). Humensis. ISBN 978-2-410-01700-7.
- Masalha, Nur (2012). The Palestine Nakba: Decolonising History, Narrating the Subaltern, Reclaiming Memory. Zed Books. ISBN 978-1-848-13970-1.
- O'Ballance, Edgar (1998). Civil War in Lebanon, 1975-92. Palgrave Macmillan. ISBN 978-0-230-37468-3.
- O'Brien, Lee (October 1983). "Campaign of Terror: Car Bombing in Lebanon". Merip Reports. pp. 23–26.
- Oren, Amir (20 May 2016). "Meir Dagan's Most Daring War Was the One He Helped Prevent". Haaretz.
- "P.L.O. aide killed in ambush". The New York Times. UPI. 28 September 1982.
- "Perpetrators: (Front for the Liberation of Lebanon from Foreigners)". Global Terrorism Database.
- Remnick, David (27 August 2012). "The Vegetarian: A notorious spymaster becomes a dissident". The New Yorker.
- Seelye, Katharine Q. (11 June 2019). "John Gunther Dean, U.S. Ambassador as Cambodia Fell, Dies at 93". The New York Times.
- "Sudden Death". Time. 28 September 1981.
- Weiss, Philip (2018). "New book gives credence to US ambassador's claim that Israel tried to assassinate him in 1980". Mondoweiss.
- Yaqub, Salim (2016). Imperfect Strangers: Americans, Arabs, and U.S.–Middle East Relations in the 1970s. Cornell University Press. ISBN 978-1-501-70688-2.
