= Kamal Kheir Beik =

Syrian poet and dissident (1935–1980)

- Born: November 1935; Qardaha, Syria
- Died: 1 November 1980 (aged 44–45); Beirut, Lebanon
- Cause of death: Assassination
- Resting place: Shatila Martyrs' cemetery
- Education: University of Geneva
- Occupation: Poet
- Years active: 1950s–1980
- Writing career
- Pen name: Cadmus; Kamal Mohamed
- Language: Arabic
- Genre: Poetry

Kamal Kheir Beik (1935–1980) was a Syrian-born poet and dissident. He is known for his Arabic poems written in free verse and for his frequent exiles. He was assassinated in Beirut on 5 November 1980 together with two other members of the Syrian Social Nationalist Party (SSNP). The murder is one of the unsolved cases in Lebanon.

== Early life and education ==
Beik was born in Qardaha, Latakia, in November 1935. He descended from an Alawite family, part of the Kalbiya confederation of Alawite tribes which included the Assad family. The two families were related through the marriage of Rifaat Al Assad's daughter with a relative of Beik.

Beik received his PhD from the University of Geneva in 1972 under the supervision of Simon Jorgy. His PhD thesis was entitled Le mouvement moderniste la poésie arabe (French: Modernity in Contemporary Arabic Poetry) which covered an analysis of the contemporary Arabic poetry with a specific focus on Shi'r, an avant-garde poetry magazine published in Beirut in the period 1957–1970. His PhD dissertation was published in French in 1978 and in Arabic in 1982.

== Career, activities and exile ==
In 1953 Beik joined the SSNP. He was sentenced to death due to his alleged role in the assassination of an army chief, Adnan Al Malki, in April 1955. Following this incident he left Syria and settled in Beirut, Lebanon. There he joined the Shi'r society led by Yusuf Al Khal and Ounsi Al Hajj. Beik was among the emerging Arabic Modernist movement members. In Lebanon he worked as a teacher in the Bishmizzine High School in the Koura District which was a Christian school serving the Greek Orthodox villages. He divided his time between Koura and Beirut. He was appointed head of information of the SSNP in 1959. Poems of Beik were featured in Al Binaa, a paper affiliated with the Syrian Social Nationalist Party in Lebanon. His first book entitled The Volcano was published in 1960 under his pseudonym Cadmus. The same year he involved in the coup attempt against the Lebanese President Fouad Chehab and was sentenced to death due to his role in the coup attempt.

Therefore, he left Lebanon for Jordan and then, settled in Paris, France, where he resumed his literary studies. He published a second book, Roaring Demonstrations, under another pseudonym Kamal Mohamed in 1965. His poems were collected by his close friends and published in three books, namely A Notebook of Absence, Farewell to Poetry and Rivers Cannot Swim in the Sea.

From 1965 Beik wrote poems in free verse in which he expressed his opposition to the leading ideologies and views in the Arab World such as Arabism and nationalism. His poems were significantly influenced by the Lebanese civil war and frequently contained sense of disillusionment and despair. While living in France Beik was an active supporter of the Palestinian resistance which led to his forced leave of the France. During this period he began to work with Wadie Haddad, a Palestinian leader, and Anis Naccache. Beik participated in some armed attacks with them. He was allegedly a member of Black September group.

Next he settled in Switzerland and taught Arabic literature at the University of Geneva between 1973 and 1975. He involved in the OPEC siege in Vienna with Carlos the Jackal in 1975 and took part in the activities to finance the siege. In his testimony Carlos claimed that an Arab leader met Beik and asked him to organize an attack against the oil ministers and to eliminate the Saudi oil minister Zaki Yamani. Upon this meeting Beik contacted with Wadie Haddad proposing him to execute the siege. After this incident Beik returned to Lebanon.

== Personal life ==
Beik first married to a Greek Orthodox woman from Koura during his exile in Lebanon. His second marriage was in Paris.

== Assassination and burial ==
Beik was subject to several assassination attempts while living in France. He was killed in Beirut in the last period of the civil war in Lebanon on 5 November 1980. During the attack two colleagues of Beik, Bashir Obeid and Nahia Bijani, who were the members of the Syrian Social Nationalist Party, were also murdered. The perpetrators were the members of a Nasserist group called Mourabitouns (Guardians).

Beik was buried at the Shatila Martyrs' cemetery.
