= Union of Working People's Forces =

- General Secretary: Kamal Chatila
- Founded: 1965
- Ideology: Nasserism
- Political position: Left-wing

The Union of Working People's Forces – UWPF (Arabic: اتحاد قوى الشعب العامل | Ittihâd qiwâ al-'amal al-cha'b al-'âmil), also known as Union of Toiling Peoples' Forces (UTPF), was a Nasserist political party in Lebanon which played a key role in the Lebanese Civil War (1975–1990).

== Origins ==
The party was founded in 1965 by Kamal Chatila and Najah Wakim, with Chatila being nominated as its general secretary. In ideological terms, the UNWPF represented a right-wing tendency in the Lebanese Nasserist movement.

Najah Wakim was elected to parliament in 1972, making him the sole Nasserist deputy.

== The UWPF in the Lebanese Civil War ==
Victory Divisions فرقة النصر
- Leader: Kamal Chatila
- Dates active: 1975–Unknown
- Active regions: Beirut, Nabatieh, Kfar Remen, Habboûch
- Size: 1,000 fighters
- Part of: Lebanese National Movement; Front of Patriotic and National Parties
- Wars: Lebanese Civil War

In the early phase of the Lebanese Civil War the UWPF maintained a 1,000-man strong militia, the Victory Divisions (Arabic: Firqat an-Nasr), which fought alongside the Lebanese National Movement (LNM) militias in the Beirut area, and also maintained military training camps in Nabatieh, Kfar Remen and Habboûch, and received significant support from both the Shia and Sunni Muslim communities. However, in late March 1976 the UWPF left the LNM to enter the pro-Syrian Front of Patriotic and National Parties (FPNP) alliance, and supported the June 1976 Syrian intervention in Lebanon, which caused a rift between them and the other Nasserist groups. From June to November 1976 the UWPF and its militia faced onslaughts by Fatah and the other LNM militias.

There was also a splinter group of the party, the Union of Working People's Forces-Corrective Movement (UWPF-CM), formed in October 1974 and led by Issam Al-Arab.

== See also ==
- Arab Socialist Union (Lebanon)
- Al-Mourabitoun
- Battle of the Hotels
- Front of Patriotic and National Parties
- Lebanese Civil War
- Lebanese Front
- Lebanese National Movement
- List of weapons of the Lebanese Civil War
- People's Movement (Lebanon)

== Bibliography ==
- Antoine J. Abraham, The Lebanon war, Greenwood Publishing Group, Westport, Connecticut 1996. ISBN 9780275953898, 0275953890
- Alain Menargues, Les Secrets de la guerre du Liban: Du coup d'état de Béchir Gémayel aux massacres des camps palestiniens, Albin Michel, Paris 2004. ISBN 978-2226121271 (in French)
- Edgar O'Ballance, Civil War in Lebanon, 1975-92, Palgrave Macmillan, London 1998. ISBN 0-333-72975-7
- Itamar Rabinovich, The war for Lebanon, 1970-1985, Cornell University Press, Ithaca and London 1989 (revised edition). ISBN 978-0-8014-9313-3, 0-8014-9313-7 –
- Marius Deeb, The Lebanese Civil War, Praeger Publishers Inc., New York 1980. ISBN 978-0030397011
- Thomas Collelo (ed.), Lebanon: a country study, Library of Congress, Federal Research Division, Headquarters, Department of the Army (DA Pam 550–24), Washington D.C., December 1987 (Third edition 1989). –
- Tom Najem and Roy C. Amore, Historical Dictionary of Lebanon, Second Edition, Historical Dictionaries of Asia, Oceania, and the Middle East, Rowman & Littlefield Publishers, Lanham, Boulder, New York & London 2021. ISBN 9781538120439, 1538120437
