= 24 October Movement =

October 24th Movement
- Founder: Farouk El Moukaddem
- Founded: 1969
- Headquarters: Lebanon
- Ideology: Social democracy
- Political position: Centre-left
- National affiliation: October 17 Movement

The 24 October Movement is a political party and former resistance movement founded by Farouk El Moukaddem in 1969. The movement promotes social democratic values, focusing on people from the lower classes who struggle through poverty.

== See also ==
- Lebanese Civil War
- Lebanese National Movement
- Palestine Liberation Organization
- List of weapons of the Lebanese Civil War
