= Rezgari Party =

Rezgari Party حزب رزكاري
- Founder: Faysal Fakhru
- Founded: April 3, 1975
- Newspaper: Xebat (transl. the Struggle)
- Ideology: Kurdish nationalism
- National affiliation: March 8 Alliance
- Slogan: Arabic: عمل - تضحية - وفاء, romanized: ‘Amal - Taḍḥiyah - Wafā’, lit. 'Work - Sacrifice - Loyalty'
- Parliament of Lebanon: 0 / 128
- Cabinet of Lebanon: 0 / 30

Party flag

The Rezgari Party or Razkari Party (Note: Alternative spellings include Rizkari, Riz Kari, Rizgari, and Rezgari.) (Arabic: حزب رزكاري, romanized: Ḥizb Rizkārī; Kurdish: حزبی ڕزگاری, romanized: Ḧizbî R̄izgarî) is a Lebanese-Kurdish political group that was established on 3 April 1975 by Faysal Fakhru, due to disagreement with the policies of the Kurdish Democratic Party – Lebanon (KDP-L) under Jamil Mihhu. The three main points of disagreement that led to the formation of the Rezgari Party were the KDP-L's failure to appeal to non-Kurmanji-speaking Kurds, its support for the Iraqi government's proposals in the Iraqi–Kurdish conflict, and accusations of nepotism within the party's leadership. The Rezgari Party continued to exist following the end of the Lebanese Civil War, becoming the only political party to represent Lebanon's estimated 100,000 Kurds, and aligning itself with Hezbollah and the March 8 Alliance.

== Lebanese Civil War ==
Shortly following the formation of the Rezgari Party, it declared, via its official bulletin Xebat (Kurdish: خەبات, lit. 'the Struggle'), its neutrality in the 1975-76 Lebanese Civil War. Thereafter, it aligned itself with the Front of Patriotic and National Parties, which was in favor of neither the Lebanese National Movement, nor the Lebanese Front.

Although the Rezgari Party supported the Kurdish rebel forces fighting against the Iraqi regime of Saddam Hussein, on 4 December 1976 the Rezgari Party joined forces with the rival pro-Iraqi KDP-L to form al-Jabha al-Wataniyya al-Kurdiyya al-'Arida (Arabic: الجبهة الوطنية الكردية العريضة, transl. the Broad Kurdish National Front, also known as the Progressive Kurdish Front). The goals of the new front were to unify Kurdish factions during the Lebanese civil war, improve the sociopolitical status of Kurds in Lebanon, and uphold their rights in employment and citizenship. The unified front only lasted a year, as KDP-L leader Jamil Mihhu was arrested by Syrian authorities in 1977.

=== Rezgari II ===
The brief alliance with the KDP-L led to the separation of a portion of the Rezgari Party to a splinter group known as the Leftist Rezgari or Rezgari II, led by Abdi Ibrahim, an ally of Hafez al-Assad's Syria. This group rejected the formation of the Progressive Kurdish Front because it included the leadership of Jamil Mihhu, the leader of the KDP-L, who was deemed by them to be right-wing. They accused the Rezgari Party's secretary-general, Faysal Fakhru, of being pro-Iraqi and not inclusive enough to all Kurds. The splinter faction continued to function until the Israeli invasion of Lebanon in June 1982, when its secretary-general Abdi Ibrahim fled to Syria. Soon after Abdi Ibrahim's flight, one high-ranking member of the party, Jamil Hasan, broke away from the splinter organization to form the Lebanese Socialist Rezgari Party. Jamil Hasan was later expelled from the party that he had formed after reconciling with Fakhru and declaring the merger of the Lebanese Socialist Rezgari Party with the original Rezgari Party in late 1984. The Lebanese Socialist Rezgari Party ceased to exist in 1985.

== After the Civil War ==
In 2009, the then-secretary-general of the Rezgari Party, Mahmud Khidr Fattah Ahmad, met with a delegation from Hezbollah, a group they have close ties to.

As of 2015, Rudaw reported that the Rezgari Party, at that point the only political organization representing the Kurds of Lebanon, was suffering from financial difficulties, with some believing that it would not survive much longer.

On 5 October 2020, it was announced that the Rezgari Party's then-secretary-general, Mahmud Khidr Fattah Ahmad, had died at the age of 73. The Kurdistan Democratic Party of Syria sent their condolences to the Rezgari Party on the occasion.

== See also ==
- Front of Patriotic and National Parties
- Lebanese Civil War
- Lebanese National Movement
