= Gebran Araiji =

Lebanese politician (1951–2019)

Gebran Araiji (Arabic: جبران عريجي, francisized transliteration Gébrane Oreiji; 1951 – 9 January 2019) was a Lebanese politician and president of the Syrian Social Nationalist Party (SSNP).

== Early life ==
Born in Zgharta, Gebran Araiji joined the SSNP in 1970 and worked since 1974 in the party's official organ publication. He emigrated to Latin America in 1975, then in France in 1977 and returned to Venezuela from 1978 to 1990.

Returning to Lebanon in 1990, he was President of Syrian Social Nationalist Party from 2001 to 2005.
