= Marwan Fares =

Lebanese politician

Member of the Lebanese Parliament
- In office 1996–2018

Personal details
- Born: 1947 (age 78–79) Qaa, Lebanon
- Profession: Writer, professor of French literature, deputy in the Lebanese Parliament

Marwan Fares (Arabic: مروان فارس; born 1947 in Qaa) is a Lebanese politician and former member of the Parliament of Lebanon. He was a leader of the Syrian Social Nationalist Party in Lebanon.

Fares earned a doctorate in French literature from Paris-Sorbonne University and was a professor at the Lebanese University.

He was elected for the Greek-Catholic seat in Baalbek-Hermel since 1996. Between 1996 and 2005, he chaired the Parliamentary Committee on Human Rights.

== See also ==
- region of Syria
- Politics of Lebanon
