= Al Binaa =

Daily newspaper in Lebanon

- Type: Daily newspaper
- Owner(s): National Media Company
- Founded: 1958
- Political alignment: Syrian Social Nationalist Party in Lebanon
- Language: Arabic
- Headquarters: Beirut
- Website: http://www.al-binaa.com/

Al Binaa (Arabic: البناء) is a Lebanese daily newspaper published in Beirut, Lebanon. Founded in 1958, it is published by the National Media Company (Arabic: الشركة القومية للإعلام, pronounced Al-Sharika Al-Qawmiya lil-I'lam), which is aligned with the Syrian Social Nationalist Party in Lebanon. The editor in chief is the Lebanese politician and former member of Parliament, Nasser Qandil.

The paper promoted cultural revival and featured the poems by Kamal Kheir Beik, Adonis, and Muhammad al-Maghut who were part of the emerging Arabic Modernist movement and were also the members of the Syrian Social Nationalist Party in Lebanon.
