= Front of Patriotic and National Parties =

Pro Syrian Lebanese political Alliance

Front of Patriotic and National Parties جبهة الأحزاب الوطنية والقومية
- Leaders: Musa al-Sadr; Nabih Berri; Assem Qanso; Kamal Chatila
- Dates active: 1976 – 1982
- Groups: Amal Movement; SSNP-L (pro-Syrian faction); Arab Socialist Ba'ath Party of Lebanon (pro-Syrian faction); Union of Working People's Forces; Razkari Party
- Headquarters: West Beirut
- Active regions: West Beirut; Beqaa Valley; Southern Lebanon
- Wars: Lebanese Civil War (1975-1990)

The Front of Patriotic and National Parties – FPNP (Arabic: جبهة الأحزاب الوطنية والقومية | Jabhat al-Ahzab al-Wataniyya wal-Qawmiyya) was a Syrian-backed coalition of Lebanese Political parties and militias formed in the late 1970s.

== Origins ==
It was formed in late March 1976 at West Beirut by breakaway sections of the Lebanese National Movement (LNM), which included the pro-Syrian factions of the Syrian Social Nationalist Party in Lebanon (SSNP-L) and the Arab Socialist Ba'ath Party of Lebanon; As well as the Shia Amal Movement led by Musa al-Sadr, the Union of Working People's Forces (UWPF) led by Kamal Chatila, and the Kurdish Razkari Party. The FPNP supported the June 1976 Syrian intervention in Lebanon.

== Decline and demise ==
The alliance lasted until mid-1982, when it collapsed together with their LNM rival in the wake of the Israeli invasion of Lebanon.

== See also ==
- Lebanese Civil War
- Lebanese National Movement
- Lebanese National Salvation Front
- Jammoul
- List of extrajudicial killings and political violence in Lebanon
