= Lycée Franco-Libanais Habbouche-Nabatieh =

- Arabic: الليسيه الفرنسية اللبنانية في حبوش النبطية

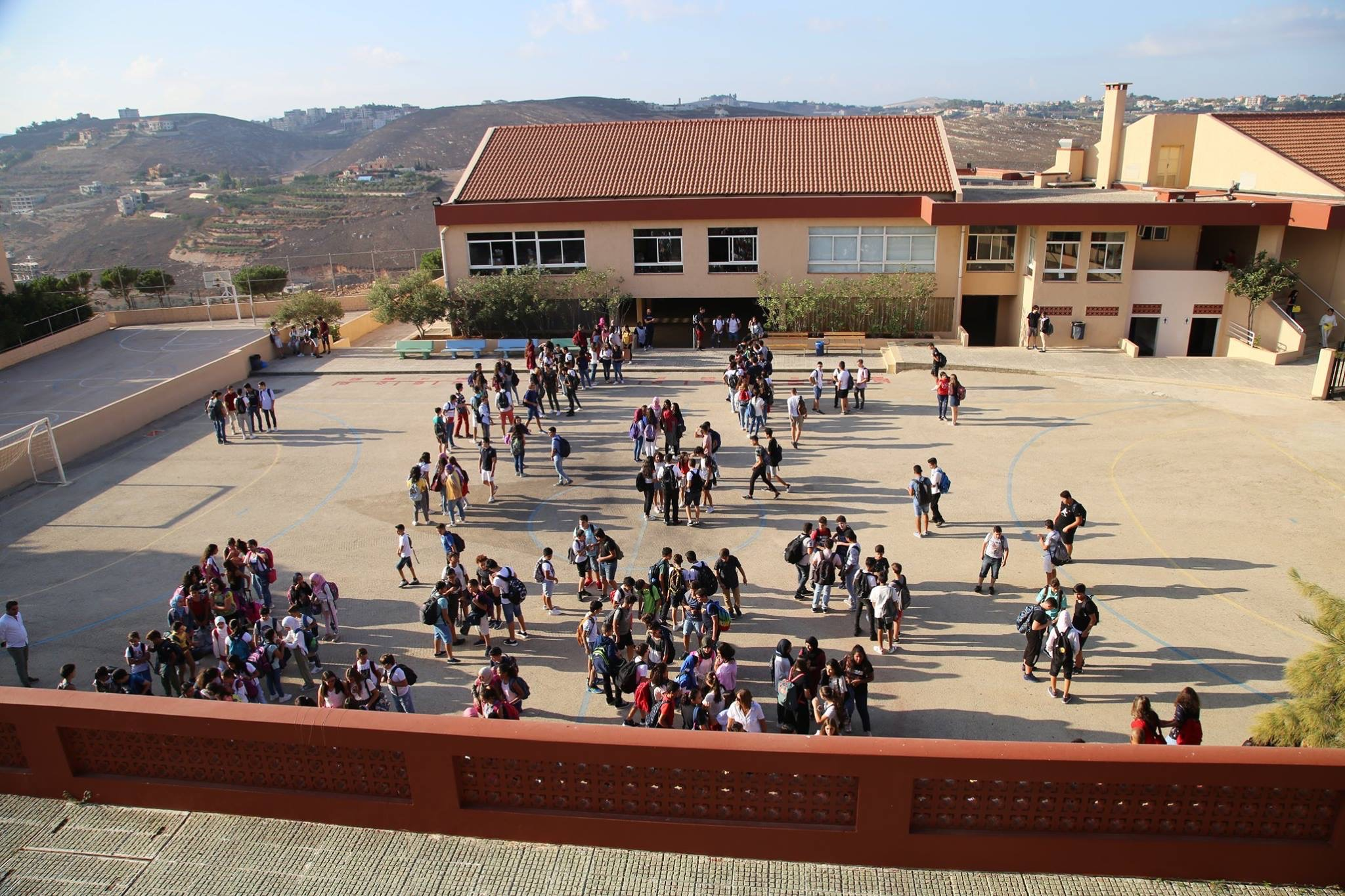
- Habboûch; Lebanon

Information
- School type: International School
- Established: 1997; 29 years ago
- Grades: Preschool - Grade 12
- Age: 3 to 18
- Enrollment: 700 (2015)
- Language: French
- Affiliation: Mission laïque française
- Website: https://www.lflhn.edu.lb/

Lycée Franco-Libanais Habbouche-Nabatieh (LFLHN; Arabic: الليسيه الفرنسية اللبنانية في حبوش النبطية) is a French international school in Habbouch, Lebanon, serving that city and Nabatieh. A part of Mission laïque française (MLF), it serves Preschool through 12th Grade. As of 2015 the school has 700 students.

The school opened in 1997, and the homologation of the elementary classes by the French Ministry of Education dates from 19/08/1998, while that of the classes of junior and senior classes date from 24/01/2005.
