= Union of Working People's Forces-Corrective Movement =

Union of Working People's Forces – Corrective Movement
- General Secretary: Issam Al-Arab (1974–1978); Hasan Qubaysi (1978–?)
- Founded: 1974
- Ideology: Nasserism

The Union of Working People's Forces – Corrective Movement or UWPF-CM (Arabic: اتحاد قوى الشعب العامل - الحركة التصحيحية | Ittihâd qiwâ al-'amal al-cha'b al-'âmil – al-harakat al-tashihia), also designated variously as the Nasserite Correctionist Movement – NCM (Arabic: الحركة التصحيحية الناصرية | Harakat al-Islahiat al-Nassery) and the Nasserite Socialists (Arabic: الاشتراكيون الناصريون | Al-Aishtirakioun al-Nassery), was a Nasserist political party in Lebanon, which was active during the Lebanese Civil War (1975–1990).

== Origins ==
Led by Issam Al-Arab, the party was formed through a split from the Union of Working People's Forces in October 1974. Apart from Al-Arab, co-founders of the group included Fouad Itani and Samih Hamada.

In founding the new party, Al-Arab condemned the support of the Union of Working People's Forces leadership to the new Egyptian president Anwar Sadat. Al-Arab argued that the Egyptian government under Sadat had abandoned Nasserism. The party joined the Lebanese National Movement (LNM), whilst its mother party Union of Working People's Forces parted ways with the LNM as it sided with the Syrian government.

== Military structure and organization ==
Nasser's Forces قوات الناصر
- Leaders: Issam Al-Arab; Hasan Qubaysi
- Dates active: 1975–Unknown
- Active regions: Beirut, Mount Lebanon (Aley, Qmatiyeh and Bdadoun)
- Part of: Lebanese National Movement
- Wars: Lebanese Civil War

Like other Lebanese Nasserist parties, the UWPF-CM had its own militia, the Nasser's Forces (Arabic: قوات ناصر | Quwwat an-Nasir) or Forces de Nasser in French, whose formation was announced on April 15, 1975. The party and its military wing were supported financially and militarly by the Libyan government.

== The UWPF-CM in the Lebanese Civil War ==
Although small in size, the Nasser's Forces took part in the street battles that engulfed Beirut, notably on the Battle of the Hotels, Chyah, on the Ras Nabi-Sodeco axis, at Khandak El Ghamik, as well as clashes at Mount Lebanon (Aley, Qmatiyeh and Bdadoun).

However, relations with its LNM coalition partners were strained to the point of the Nasser's Forces battling rival Nasserite parties such as the Al-Mourabitoun in November 1975 over control of the Karantina district in East Beirut.

The party underwent a split in 1978. In an extraordinary congress there was a dispute between Al-Arab, who argued in favour of alliance with the governments of Iraq and Libya, and his opponents led by Hassan Qubaysi. On July 23, 1978 Al-Arab was declared expelled from the party and Qubaysi was named the new General Secretary of the party.

The Nasser's Forces continued confronting the Christian Lebanese Front right-wing militias between 1978 and 1982. After the 1982 Israeli invasion of Lebanon and the departure of the PLO, the Nasser Forces went underground and supposedly converted itself into a clandestine resistance group.

== See also ==
- Arab Socialist Union (Lebanon)
- Al-Mourabitoun
- Battle of the Hotels
- Lebanese Civil War
- Lebanese National Movement
- Lebanese National Resistance Front
- List of weapons of the Lebanese Civil War
- Syrian intervention in the Lebanese Civil War
- Union of Working People's Forces

== Bibliography ==
- Antoine J. Abraham, The Lebanon war, Greenwood Publishing Group, Westport, Connecticut 1996. ISBN 9780275953898, 0275953890
- Edgar O'Ballance, Civil War in Lebanon, 1975-92, Palgrave Macmillan, London 1998. ISBN 0-333-72975-7
- Itamar Rabinovich, The war for Lebanon, 1970-1985, Cornell University Press, Ithaca and London 1989 (revised edition). ISBN 978-0-8014-9313-3, 0-8014-9313-7 –
- Marius Deeb, The Lebanese Civil War, Praeger Publishers Inc, New York 1980. ISBN 978-0-03-039701-1
- Paul Jureidini, R. D. McLaurin, and James Price, Military operations in selected Lebanese built-up areas, 1975-1978, Aberdeen, MD: U.S. Army Human Engineering Laboratory, Aberdeen Proving Ground, Technical Memorandum 11–79, June 1979.
- Tom Najem and Roy C. Amore, Historical Dictionary of Lebanon, Second Edition, Historical Dictionaries of Asia, Oceania, and the Middle East, Rowman & Littlefield Publishers, Lanham, Boulder, New York & London 2021. ISBN 9781538120439, 1538120437
- Tony Badran (Barry Rubin ed.), Lebanon: Liberation, Conflict, and Crisis, Palgrave Macmillan, London 2010. ISBN 978-0-230-62306-4
