= John Kifner =

American journalist

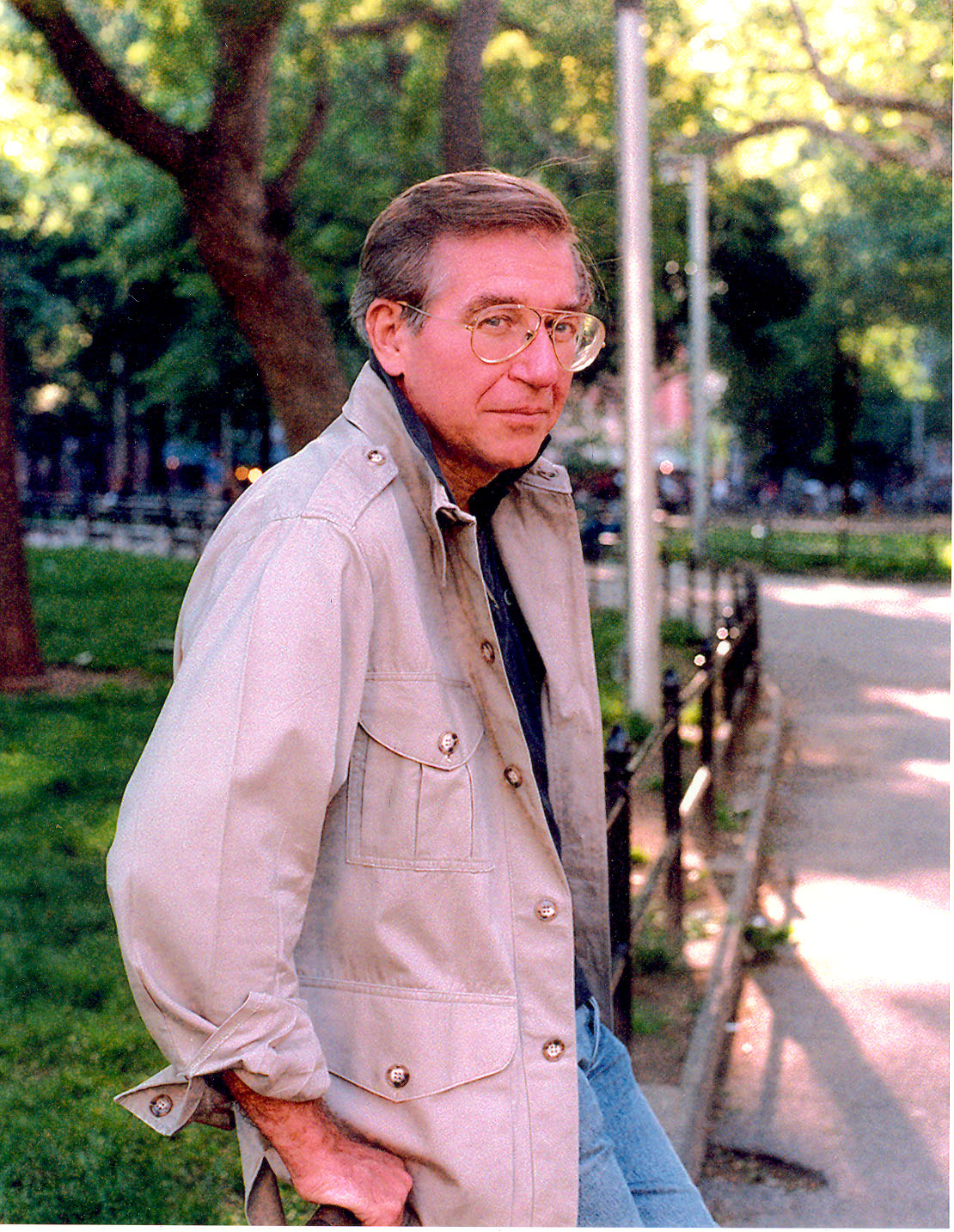
- Kifner in 1994
- Born: 1942 (age 83–84); Cornwall-on-Hudson, New York, U.S.
- Occupation: Former senior foreign correspondent for the New York Times

John William Kifner (born 1942) is a former senior foreign correspondent for The New York Times. Kifner, who was born in 1942 in Cornwall-on-Hudson, New York served as an editor on his Williams College student newspaper, The Williams Record. He joined The New York Times as a copy boy in 1963 and sought reporting assignments, becoming a metropolitan reporter with the Times in October 1988. After serving as bureau chief in Cairo from October 1985, he continued to cover both national and foreign stories. In 2003, he reported the initial attacks of the war in Iraq with the Marines and in 2004 he covered the conflict from Falluja. Kifner also was in the first Gulf War in 1991 with the 101st Airborne Division. Kifner has reported on the wars and conflict in Lebanon, Iraq, Iran, Afghanistan, Bosnia, Kosovo, Israel-Occupied Gaza, Southern Yemen and the former Yugoslavia.

Since joining The New York Times in 1963, Kifner has been both a national and a foreign correspondent based first in Chicago and then Boston. He became bureau chief in Beirut in October 1979, then transferred to Warsaw in May 1982, and again was reassigned to Beirut in May 1984.

While in the Middle East, Kifner covered the Iranian Revolution in 1979 and won a George Polk Memorial Award that year for his reporting of the event. Throughout his career, Kifner has received numerous awards, including the 1998 John Chancellor Award for Excellence in Journalism from the Annenberg Public Policy Center at the University of Pennsylvania. The award was won for the body of his work, for both foreign and domestic reporting. The Annenberg School for Communication, which administers the award, cited his ability to translate "complicated changes in the political, economic and cultural landscape for American readers." The award is given in honor of John Chancellor, the NBC television correspondent and anchor who died in 1996.

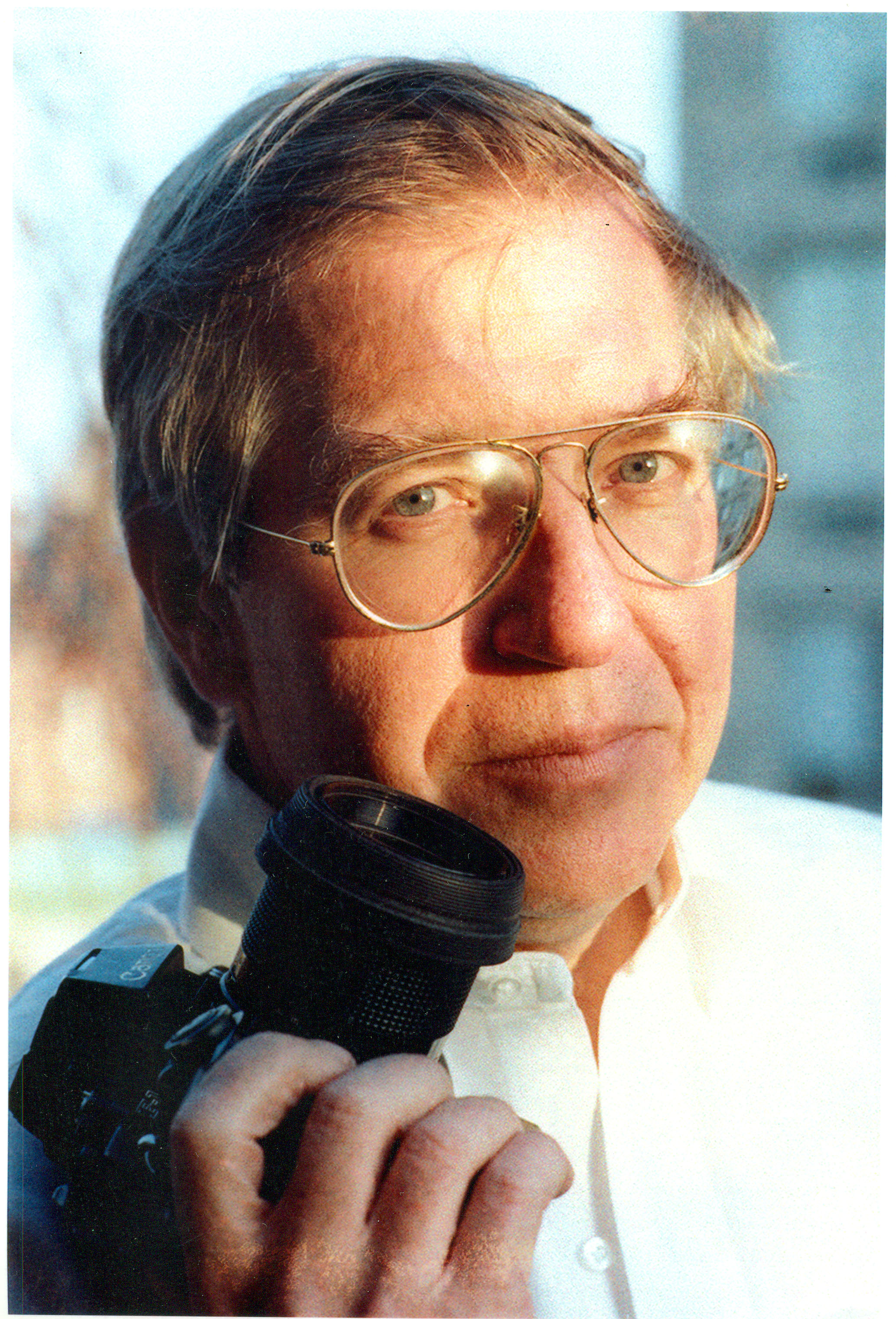
John Kifner in 1993

Kifner graduated from Williams College in 1963 and attended Harvard University on a Nieman Fellowship in 1971 and 1972. He currently resides in New York and still writes occasionally for the Times.

Kifner's deep affection for his Siamese cats, Duke and Studs, is immortalized by New York Times colleague Christopher S. Wren in a passage from his book, The Cat Who Covered the World: The Adventures of Henrietta and Her Foreign Correspondent, (Simon & Schuster, 2000).

== Recent work ==
- (2008). "Of Turbans and Neckties: Why Past Defines Present". dispatches.
