= Habboûch =

Habboûch حبّوش
- Municipality
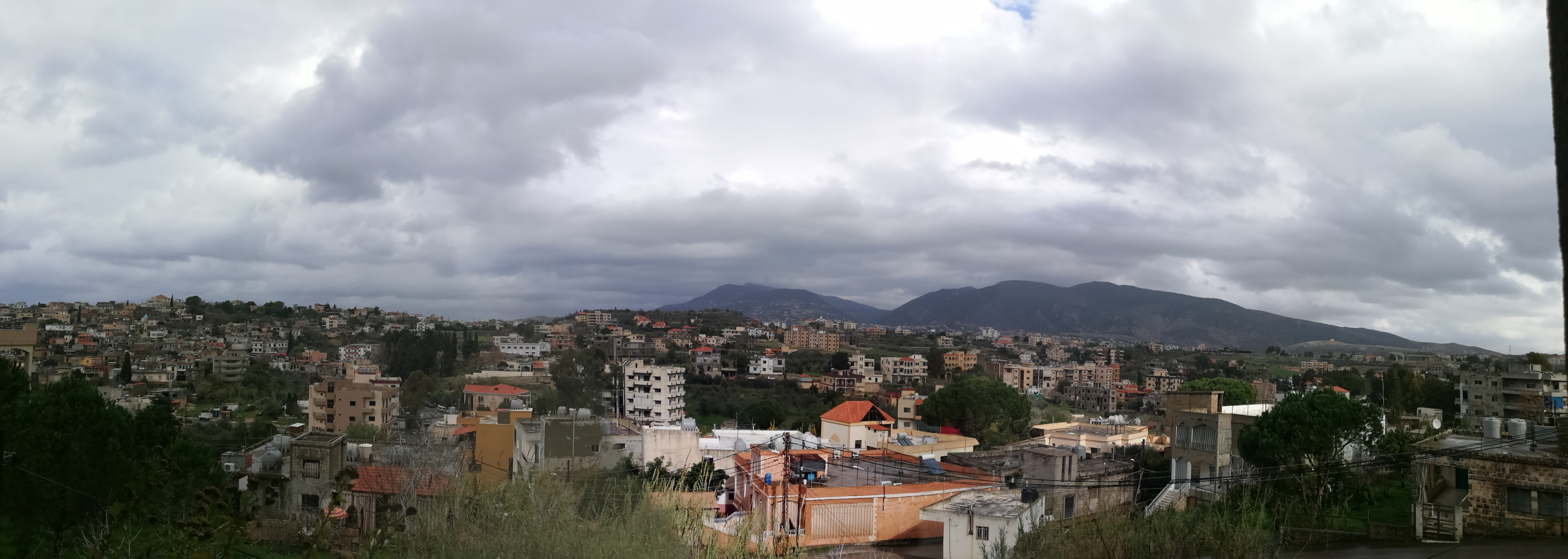
- Habboûch in 2018

- Location in Lebanon
- Coordinates: 33°24′N 35°29′E
- Grid position: 126/163 L
- Country: Lebanon
- Governorate: Nabatieh Governorate
- District: Nabatieh District
- Time zone: UTC+2 (EET)
  - Summer (DST): +3

Habboûch (Arabic: حبّوش) is a municipality in southern Lebanon. The population is estimated to be approximately 15,000. It is located at latitude 33.4072900 and longitude 35.4816900.

== History ==
In 1875 Victor Guérin found the village to be inhabited by 200 Metualis.

== Demographics ==
In 2014 Muslims made up 99.31% of registered voters in Habboûch. 96.47% of the voters were Shiite Muslims.

== See also ==
- Lycée Franco-Libanais Habbouche-Nabatieh

== Bibliography ==
- Guérin, V. (1880). Description Géographique Historique et Archéologique de la Palestine (in French). Vol. 3: Galilee, pt. 2. Paris: L'Imprimerie Nationale.
