= Syrian intervention in the Lebanese Civil War =

Syrian Military Operation in Lebanon

- Part of the Lebanese Civil War
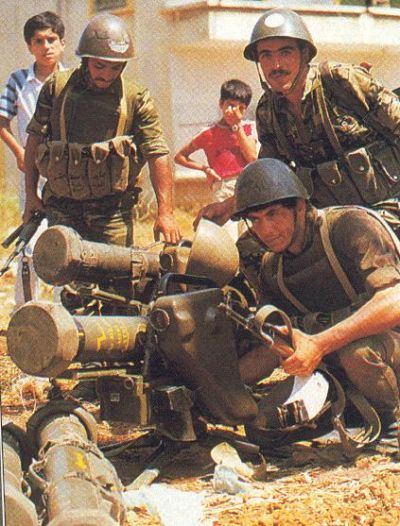
- Syrian anti-tank teams deploy French-made Milan ATGMs during the war in Lebanon, 1982.
| Date | 1976 – 1990 |
| Location | Lebanon |
| Territorial changes | Syrian partial occupation of Lebanon until 2005 |

Belligerents
| (Ba'athist Syria) Ba'athist Syria; In support of: FPNP; PNSF; ADP; Marada Brigade; Supported by: Lebanese Forces (1976-1978); Lebanese National Movement (from 1978); Palestine Liberation Organization (Pro-Syrian government faction); Lebanese National Resistance Front (from 1982); Arab Deterrent Force (1976-1979) | Palestine Liberation Organization (Anti-Syrian government faction); Lebanese National Movement (until 1978) | Lebanese Forces (from 1978); South Lebanon Army; Lebanese Armed Forces; Supported by: Israel (Lebanese Forces and South Lebanon Army only; until 1982; Israel only continued supporting the South Lebanon Army) |

Commanders and leaders
| (Ba'athist Syria) Hafez al-Assad (Ba'athist Syria) Mustafa Tlass (Ba'athist Syria) Ali Habib Mahmud (Ba'athist Syria) Hikmat al-Shihabi (Ba'athist Syria) Shafiq Fayadh (Ba'athist Syria) Ali Haydar; Nabih Berri (Palestine) Ahmed Jibril (Palestine) George Habash; Ali Eid; Suleiman Frangieh | (Palestine) Yasser Arafat; Kamal Jumblatt X Walid Jumblatt | Pierre Gemayel; Amine Gemayel; Bachir Gemayel X Saad Haddad; Antoine Lahad; Michel Aoun; Ibrahim Tannous |

Strength
| (Ba'athist Syria) 25,000 (1976) (Ba'athist Syria) 30,000 (1982) | 45,000 (1976) (including allied PLO fighters) | 20,000 (1976) |

Ba'athist Syria launched a military intervention in the Lebanese Civil War in 1976, one year after the breakout of the war, as Syrian Arab Armed Forces began supporting Maronite militias against the Palestine Liberation Organization (PLO) and leftist militias. Syria also raised a proxy militia of its own, the Palestine Liberation Army (PLA). Hafez al-Assad's primary objective was to suppress the rise of PLO and allied pro-Palestinian militias in Lebanon which toed a hardline stance against Israel; the invasion received widespread rebuke in the Arab world.

The involvement was later legalized under the pretext of Arab Deterrent Force of the Arab League. In 1982, Syria battled Israel over control of Lebanon.

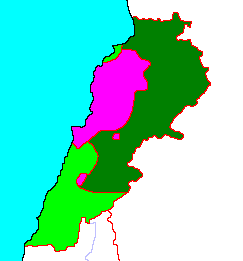
Map showing power balance in Lebanon, 1976: Controlled by Syria and its allies. Controlled by the Lebanese Forces Controlled by LNM and PLO

== Timeline ==
=== 1976 Syrian intervention ===
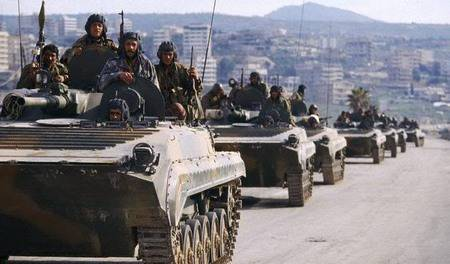
Column of Syrian armored vehicles entered Lebanon.

On 22 January 1976, Syrian president Hafez al-Assad brokered a truce between the two sides, while covertly beginning to move Syrian troops into Lebanon under the guise of the Palestine Liberation Army in order to bring the PLO back under Syrian influence and prevent the disintegration of their power in Lebanon. Despite this, the violence continued to escalate. In March 1976, Lebanese President Suleiman Frangieh requested that Syria formally intervene. Days later, Hafez sent a message to the United States asking them not to interfere if he were to send troops into Lebanon.

On 8 May 1976, Elias Sarkis, who was supported by Syria, defeated Frangieh in a presidential election held by the Lebanese Parliament. However, Frangieh refused to step down. On 1 June 1976, 12,000 regular Syrian troops entered Lebanon and began conducting operations against Palestinian and leftist militias. This technically put Syria on the same side as Israel, as Israel had already begun to supply Maronite forces with arms, tanks, and military advisers in May 1976. Syria had its own political and territorial interests in Lebanon, which sheltered secretly cells of Sunni Islamists and anti-Ba'athist Muslim Brotherhood.

Since January, the Tel al-Zaatar refugee camp in East Beirut had been under siege by Maronite Christian militias. On 12 August 1976, supported by Syria, Maronite forces managed to overwhelm the Palestinian and leftist militias defending the camp. The Christian militia massacred 1,000–1,500 civilians , which unleashed heavy criticism against Syria from the Arab world.

On 19 October 1976, the Battle of Aishiya took place, when a combined force of PLO and a Communist militia attacked Aishiya, a small and isolated Maronite village. The Artillery Corps of the Israel Defense Forces fired 24 shells (66 kilograms of TNT each) from US-made 175-millimeter field artillery units at the attackers, repelling their first attempt. However, the PLO and Communists returned at night, when low visibility made Israeli artillery far less effective. The Maronite population of the village fled. They returned in 1982.

In October 1976, Syria accepted the proposal of the Arab League summit in Riyadh. This gave Syria a mandate to keep 40,000 troops in Lebanon as the bulk of an Arab Deterrent Force charged with disentangling the combatants and restoring calm. Other Arab nations were also part of the ADF, but they lost interest relatively soon, and Syria was again left in sole control, now with the ADF as a diplomatic shield against international criticism. The Civil War was officially paused at this point, and an uneasy quiet settled over Beirut and most of the rest of Lebanon. In the south, however, the climate began to deteriorate as a consequence of the gradual return of PLO combatants, who had been required to vacate central Lebanon under the terms of the Riyadh Accords.

During 1975–1977, 60,000 people were killed.

=== Hundred Days War (1977) ===
The Hundred Days War (Arabic: حرب المئة يوم | Harb Al-Mia'at Yaoum), also known as La Guerre des Cent Jours in French, was a subconflict within the 1977–82 phase of the Lebanese Civil War which occurred at the Lebanese Capital Beirut. It was fought between the allied Christian Lebanese Front militias, under the command of the Kataeb Party's President Bachir Gemayel, and the Syrian troops of the Arab Deterrent Force (ADF).

=== Battle of Zahleh (1980–1981) ===
The Battle of Zahleh (Arabic: معركة زحلة) took place during the Lebanese Civil War, between December 1980 and June 1981. During the seven-month period, the city of Zahle (Arabic: زحلة) endured a handful of political and military setbacks. The opposing key players were on the one side, the Lebanese Forces or LF (Arabic: القوات اللبنانية) aided by Zahlawi townspeople, and on the other side, the Syrian Armed Forces, then part of the peace-keeping Arab Deterrent Force or ADF (Arabic: قوات الردع العربية), aided by some Palestine Liberation Organization (PLO) factions. Demographically, Zahleh is one of the largest predominantly Christian towns in Lebanon. Adjacent to the town's outskirts, the Bekaa valley (Arabic: وادي البقاع), spanning the length of the Syrian borders. Given Zahleh's close proximity to the Bekaa Valley, the Syrian Armed Forces feared a potential alliance between Israel and the LF in Zahleh. This potential alliance would not only threaten the Syrian military presence in the Bekaa valley, but was regarded as a national security threat from the Syrians' point of view, given the close proximity between Zahleh and the Beirut-Damascus highway. Consequently, as a clamp-down strategy, the Syrian forces controlled the major roads leading in and out of the city and fortified the entire Valley. Around December 1980, tension increased between Zahlawi Lebanese Forces and Syrian-backed Leftist militants. From April to June 1981, throughout the four-month period, a handful of LF members, aided by Zahlawi Local Resistance, confronted the Syrian war machine and defended the city from Syrian intrusion and potential invasion.

=== 1982 Syrian warfare with Israel and its allies ===
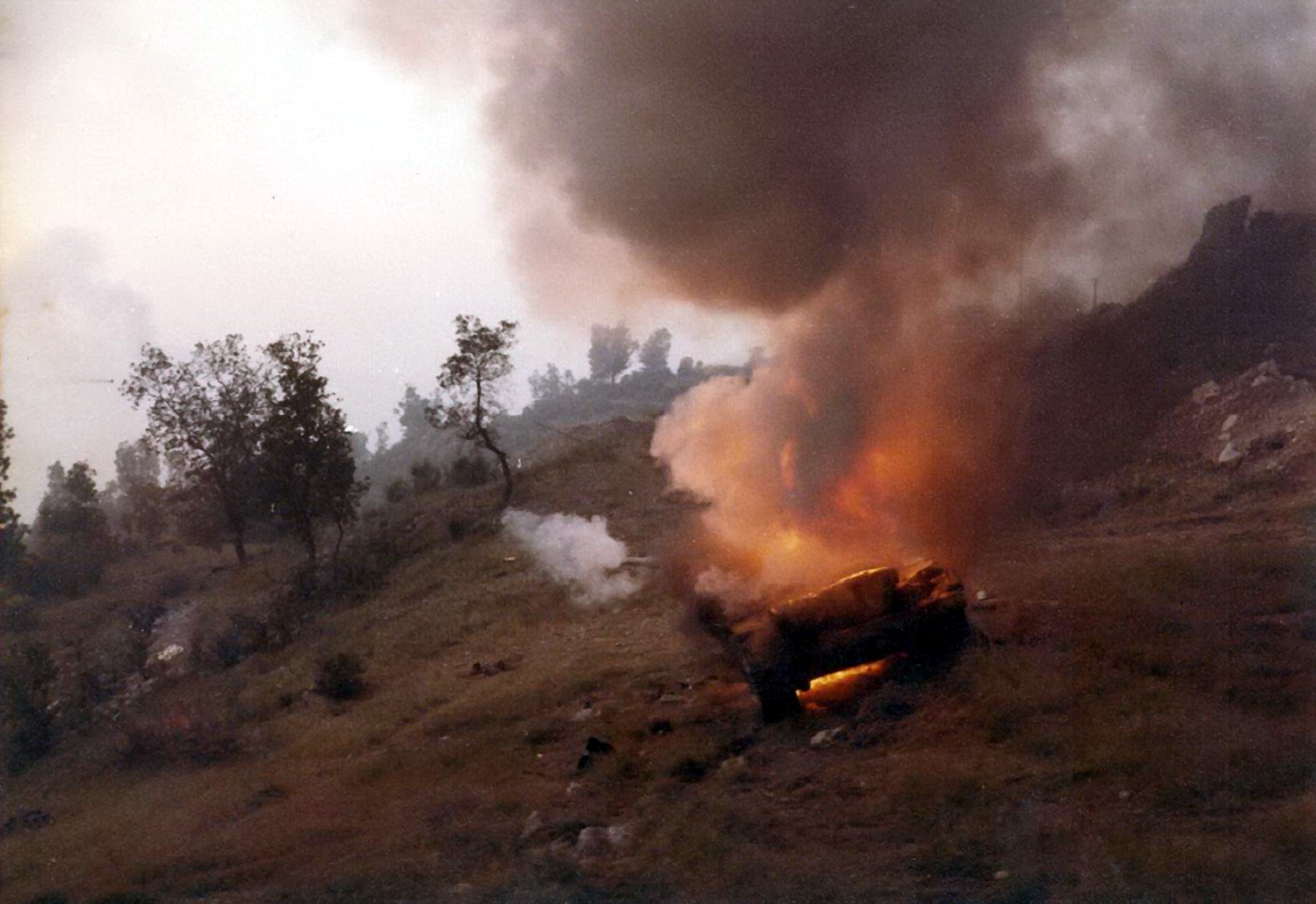
A Syrian tank burning on the road outside Jezzine

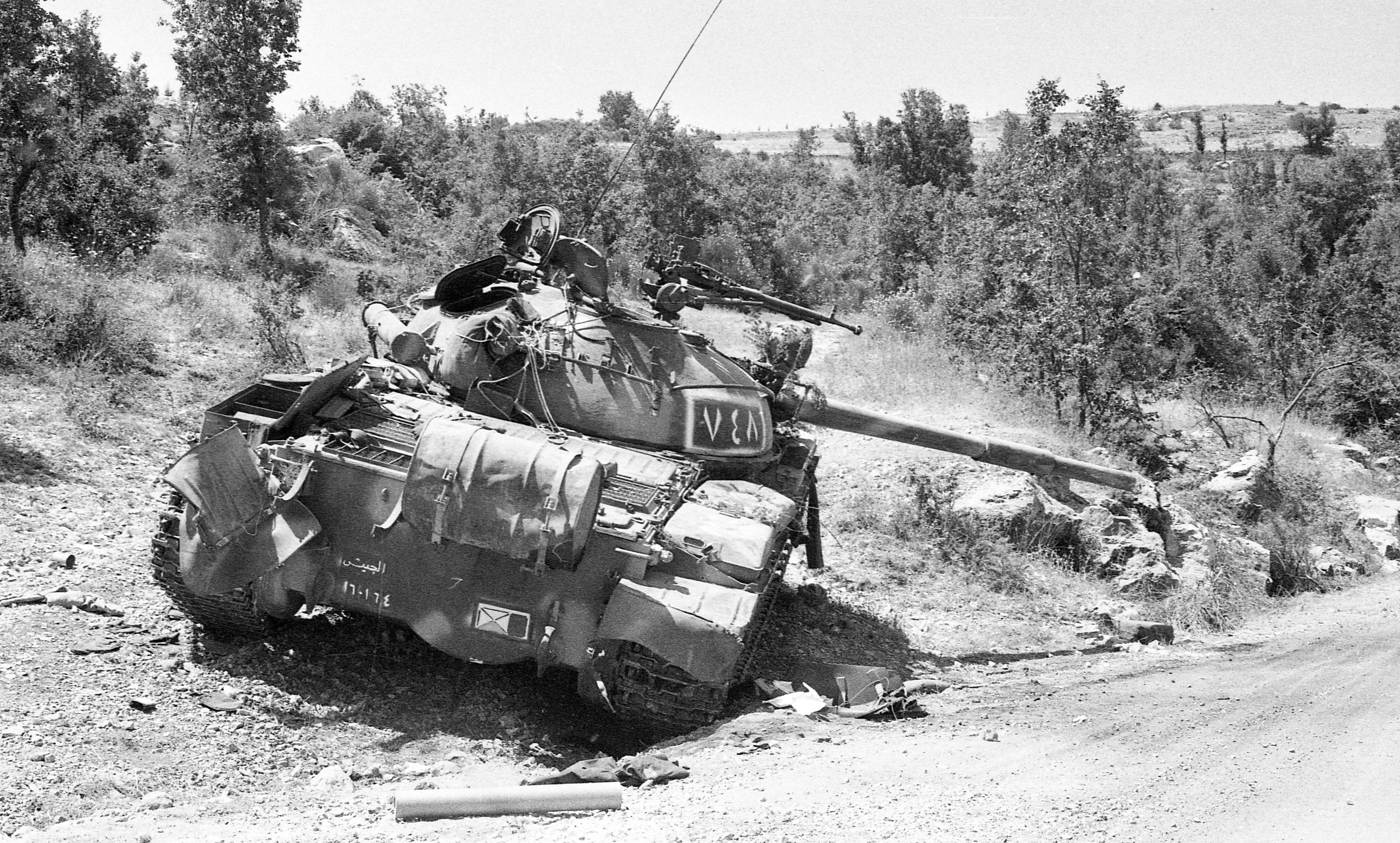
Syrian T-62 Tank Destroyed in Lebanon by the IDF in 1982.

According to Zeev Maoz in Defending the Holy Land: A Critical Analysis of Israel's National Security and Foreign Policy the goals of the war were primarily developed by then Minister of Defense Ariel Sharon and were fourfold: 1) "Destroy the PLO infrastructure in Lebanon, including the PLO headquarters in Beirut." 2) "Drive Syrian forces out of Lebanon." 3) "Install a Christian-dominated government in Lebanon, with Bashir Gemayel as President." 4) "Sign a peace treaty with the Lebanese government that would solidify the informal Israeli-Christian alliance and convert it into a binding agreement." George Ball testified before the U.S: Senate's Foreign Affairs Committee that Sharon's long-term strategy, as revealed in conversations, was one of "squeezing the Palestinians out of the West Bank . .allowing only enough of them to remain for work."

Fighting broke out in Jezzine between the Israelis and Syrian forces holding the town. In the Battle of Jezzine, Israeli forces consisting of two tank battalions supported by a reconnaissance company and engineering platoon took Jezzine in a fierce daylong battle against a Syrian battalion, then repulsed a fierce counterattack by dozens of Syrian commandos during the night in combat that lasted until dawn. Meanwhile, Israeli forces continued to advance along the Syrians' right flank.

In an effort to establish air superiority and greater freedom of action, the Israeli Air Force launched Operation Mole Cricket 19 on 9 June. During the course of the operation, the Israeli Air Force scored a dramatic victory over the Syrians, shooting down 29 Syrian planes and also destroying 17 Syrian anti-aircraft missile batteries, employing electronic warfare methods to confuse and jam the Syrian radars. The Israelis' only known losses were a single UAV shot down and two fighter jets damaged. Later that night, an Israeli air attack destroyed a Syrian armored brigade moving south from Baalbek, and the IAF attacked and destroyed six more Syrian SAM batteries the following day. The easternmost Israeli force, which had been stationary, resumed its advance forward up the Bekaa Valley.

In the center, Israeli forces were ambushed by the Syrians as they approached Ain Zhalta, and were pinned down by Syrian forces firing from superior positions. The Israelis were bogged down, and an infantry battalion was sent in by helicopter to reinforce them. The town was only captured after a two-day armored and infantry battle. After Ain Zhalta fell, the Israelis advanced to the town of Ain Dara, which overlooked the Beirut-Damascus highway, and captured the heights overlooking the town. Along the road to Ain Dara, the Israelis encountered Syrian tank and commando units, and found themselves bogged down as the Syrians took advantage of the terrain. The Israelis called in air support, and Israeli attack helicopters that took advantage of ravines to fly in low beneath their targets to gain an element of surprise proved particularly effective against Syrian tanks. After a daylong battle, the Israelis had surrounded Ain Dara and were in a position to strike on the highway.

In the east, Israeli forces advanced along four main routes towards Joub Jannine, along both sides of the Qaraoun reservoir. The Syrians resisted fiercely. Syrian infantrymen armed with anti-tank weapons staged ambushes against Israeli tanks, and Syrian Gazelle helicopters armed with HOT missiles proved effective against Israeli armor. However, the Israelis managed to capture the valley floor, and the Syrians retreated. The Israelis captured Rachaiya, advanced through Kfar Quoq, and took the outskirts of Yanta. Joub Jannine also fell to the Israelis. The extent of Israeli advances ensured that Syrian reinforcements were blocked from deploying west of the Qaraoun reservoir. An Israeli armored battalion then probed past Joub Jannine to the town of Sultan Yacoub, and was ambushed by Syrian forces lying in wait. In the Battle of Sultan Yacoub, the Israelis fought fiercely to extricate themselves, and called in reinforcements and artillery fire to cover the withdrawal. After six hours, the Israelis managed to retreat. In addition, another major air battle erupted in which the Israeli Air Force shot down 25 Syrian jets and 4 helicopters.

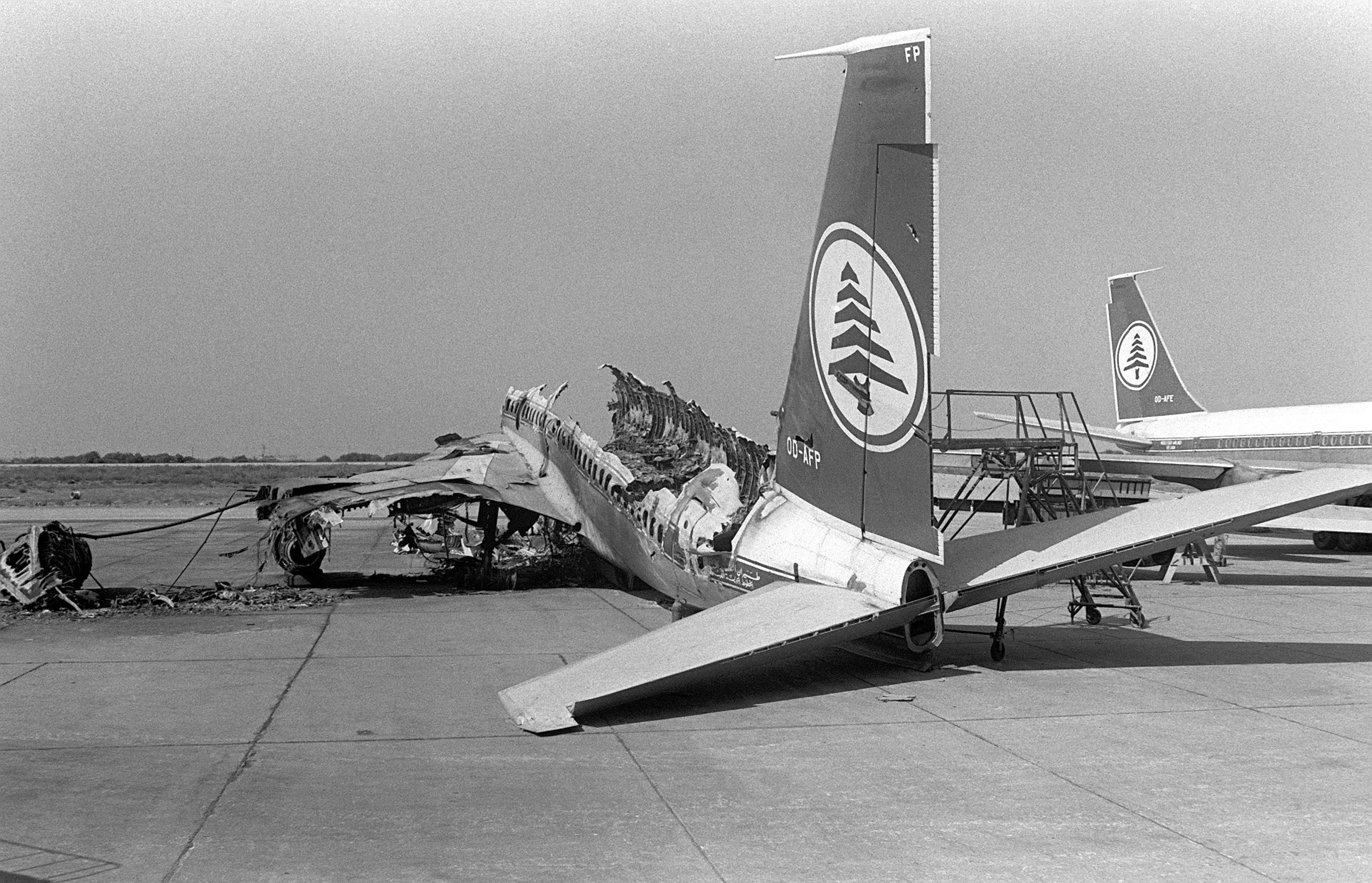
A destroyed airliner at Beirut Airport, 1982.

To the west, as IDF troops mopped up remaining resistance in Tyre and Sidon, the Israeli advance on Beirut continued, and Syrian tank and commando units were then deployed south of Beirut to reinforce the PLO. When the Israelis reached the Beirut suburb of Kafr Sill, they met a joint Syrian-PLO force for the first time, and fought a difficult battle to take it. The IDF temporarily halted its advance in the western sector at Kafr Sill.

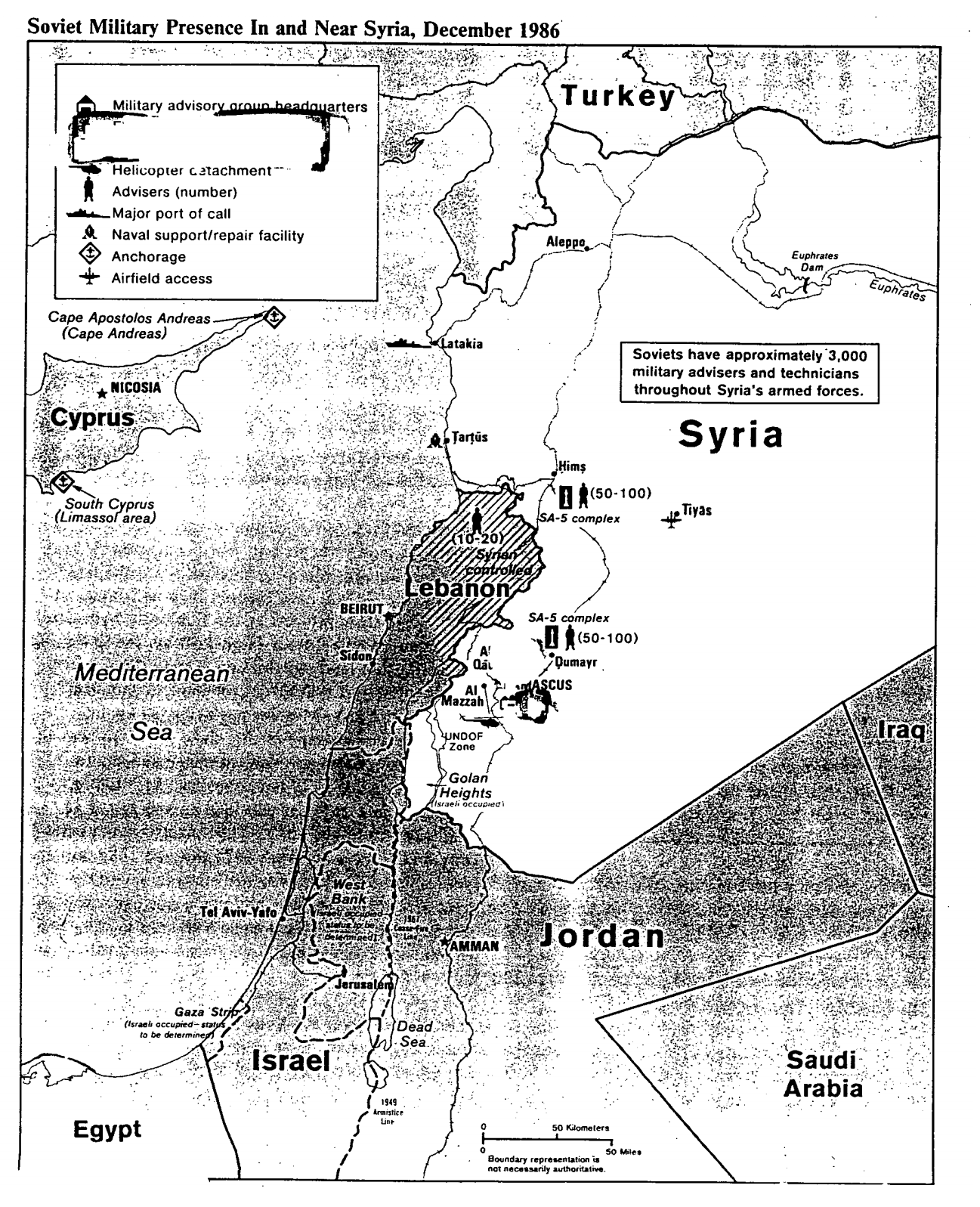
Soviet Military Presence in Syria and Lebanon, December 1986

On 11 June 1982, Israel and Syria announced that they had agreed to a cease-fire at noon, which would not include the PLO. The cease-fire was to come into effect at noon. Just before the cease-fire was to take effect, the Syrians moved a column of T-72 tanks so as to position it against Israeli forces in the valley. Israeli infantry teams armed with BGM-71 TOW anti-tank missiles ambushed the Syrian column, destroying 11 tanks. Another air battle also occurred, with the Israelis shooting down 18 more Syrian jets. On 12 June, the Israeli-Syrian cease-fire was extended to the PLO. As the Israeli advance halted, the Israelis turned their attention to the zone they already occupied in southern Lebanon, and began a policy to root out any PLO remnants. On 13 June, less than twelve hours after the Israeli-PLO ceasefire had gone into effect, it fell apart, and heavy fighting erupted around Khalde. As the fighting raged, an IDF armored unit struck northeast, attempting to bypass Khalde and advance on Baabda, which overlooked the airport and could be used as another staging point to cut the Beirut-Damascus highway. By 14 June, Syrian forces were being deployed to Khalde. Syrian units in Beirut and three commando battalions armed with anti-tank weaponry took up defensive positions southwest of the airport to block any Israeli attempt to capture it. The Israelis attempted to flank these defenses by moving off the road past Shuweifat, up a narrow, steep, and winding road towards Baabda, but were ambushed by a Syrian commando battalion. The Syrians attacked Israeli armor with rocket-propelled grenades and anti-tank missiles at close range. Israeli infantry dismounted and engaged the Syrians. Fierce fighting took place, with the Israelis calling in artillery at very close range to themselves. The Israelis advanced relentlessly, and after fourteen hours of fierce combat that raged up through Ain Aanoub and Souq el-Gharb, they broke through the Syrian positions and entered Baabda.

On 15 June, Israel offered free passage to all Syrian forces in Beirut if they would withdraw from the city to the Bekaa Valley in the east, but the Syrian government refused and sent further reinforcements to its units along the highway and north of the highway near Beirut. The Israelis faced Syrian strongpoints reinforced by armor and artillery all along the highway. However, between 16 June and 22 June, the fighting was limited to artillery duels and minor firefights between Israeli and Syrian forces, as both sides reinforced their troops.

=== Battles in Tripoli (1983–1985) ===
==== Battle of Tripoli (1983) ====
In early November 1983, Syrian-backed PLO dissidents engaged in conflict with Arafat's PLO and the Islamic Unification Movement (IUM). Initially, they assaulted PLO positions on the outskirts of the city, mainly in the Palestinian camps of Beddawi and Nahr al Bared. Most fighting took in the form of heavy artillery and rocket fire, in which 34 people were killed and more than 100 wounded.On November 3, the rebels organised an offensive on both camps in which 3 days later one of the camps, Nahr al Bared fell.On November 9, a ceasefire was agreed upon. Arafat stated that many mediation attempts have been ongoing with Saudi Arabia, Algeria and Head of the Arab League, Chedli Klibi of Tunisia in which three conditions were listed.However, fighting resumed and on the 16, the PLO had mostly been expelled from both of the camps whilst some pockets of Arafat loyalists held out in Beddawi. The day before, Syria's Armed Forces began to bombard Tripoli on their own accord which included destroying 3 ships in the Port. On November 18, Arafat loyalists launched a counter-offensive which lasted 3 days which produced undesirable results with more parts of the city being destroyed due to heavy artillery fire. On November 22, Syrian-backed PLO dissidents made huge advances, cutting major intersections and roads leading to Beddawi. Pro-Syrian alawite militants also rose up against the PLO. Despite the situation looking bleak, IUM leader Said Shaaban, urged Arafat to keep fighting. With continued attacks by Pro-Syrian militants and Syria itself, Arafat yielded and signed a ceasefire evacuating from Tripoli, and leaving Lebanon entirely.

==== Conflict with Tawhid ====
On 13 September 1985, hostilities opened between the Islamic Unification Movement who had taken control of most previously controlled PLO areas in the city of Tripoli after their expulsion and the Syrian allied Arab Democratic Party. The battled emerged with skirmishes in mid-September between the Tawhid and ADP which got the involvement of the Syrian Army. Concentration of skirmishes were centred on Jabal Mosheen the American Quarter, which then extended to Bab al-Tebbaneh and Qobbe. After a few days of intense shelling by the Syrian Army, the Tawhid agreed a surrender. On October 7, 20,000 Syrian troops entered Tripoli to enforce the ceasefire with displaced civilians beginning to return from November 1985.

=== Campaign against Aoun (1990) ===
On 13 October 1990, Ba'athist Syria launched a major operation involving its army, air force (for the first time since Zahle's siege in 1981) and Lebanese allies (mainly the Lebanese Army led by General Émile Lahoud) against Aoun's stronghold around the presidential palace, where hundreds of Aoun supporters were killed. It then cleared out the last Aounist pockets, cementing its hold on the capital. Aoun fled to the French Embassy in Beirut, and later into exile in Paris. He was not able to return until May 2005.

William Harris claims that the Syrian operation could not take place until Syria had reached an agreement with the United States, that in exchange for support against the Iraqi government of Saddam Hussein in the Gulf War, it would convince Israel not to attack Syrian aircraft approaching Beirut. Aoun claimed in 1990 that the United States "has sold Lebanon to Syria".

== Scale of involvement ==
=== 1976 ===
On 22 January 1976, Syrian President Hafez al-Assad brokered a truce between the two sides, while covertly beginning to move Syrian troops into Lebanon under the guise of the Palestine Liberation Army in order to bring the PLO back under Syrian influence and prevent the disintegration of their power over Lebanon.

On 1 June 1976, 12,000 regular Ba'athist Syrian troops entered Lebanon and began conducting operations against Palestinian and leftist militias.

=== 1982 ===
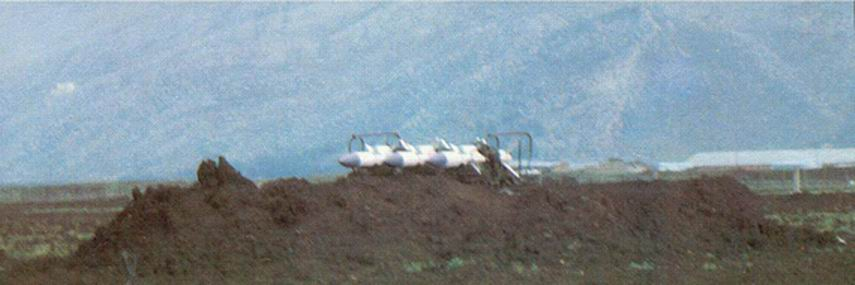
Part of a Syrian SA-6 site built near the Beirut-Damascus highway, and overlooking the Bekaa Valley, in early 1982.

The Syrian Army deployed over 30,000 troops in Lebanon.

The largest concentration was in the Bekaa Valley where the 1st Armoured Division consisting of the 58th Mechanised and the 76th and 91st Armoured Brigades. The 62nd Independent Armored Brigade and ten commando battalions were also assigned to the division. Syria deployed around 400 tanks in the Bekaa Valley. 19 surface-to-air missile batteries, including SA-6's, were also deployed in the Bekaa Valley.

In Beirut and the Shouf Mountains were the 85th Infantry Brigade, the PLA, As-Sa'iqa and 20 commando battalions. Syria deployed around 200 tanks in this area. Their primary mission was to protect the Beirut-Damascus Highway, which was Syria's primary supply line in the region.

== See also ==
- Lebanese Civil War
- List of extrajudicial killings and political violence in Lebanon
- Cedar Revolution
- Multinational Force in Lebanon
- List of modern conflicts in the Middle East
