= Revolutionary Communist Group (Lebanon) =

Trotskyist organisation in Lebanon

The Revolutionary Communist Group (RCG; Arabic: المجموعة الشيوعية الثورية | Tajammu' al-Shuyu'i al-Thawri) is a Trotskyist organisation in Lebanon, associated with the reunified Fourth International.

== History ==
The GCR was founded in the 1970s as a full 'section' of the Fourth International. The 2003 World Congress of the International reorganised it as a sympathising group, reflecting a decline in the GCR's membership.

The organisation contributes to International Viewpoint and Inprecor.

== Members ==
- Hani Adada (journalist)

== See also ==
- Communist Action Organization in Lebanon (OCAL)
- Lebanese Communist Party
- Lebanese Civil War
- Lebanese National Movement
- Progressive Socialist Party
- 1982 Lebanon War
