= Nasserist Unionists Movement =

The Nasserist Unionists Movement – NUM or Nasserite Unification Movement (Arabic: حركة الوحدويين الناصريين | Al-Harakat Al-Tawhidiya Al-Nassiriya) is a minor Lebanese political party headed by Samir Sabbagh. It was founded in 1982 out from a splinter faction of the INM/Al-Mourabitoun, originally under the label Movement of Unionist Nasserites – MUN (Arabic: حركة الوحدويين الناصريين | Harakat al-Wihdawiyin al-Nasiriyin). The NUM aims to unify all Lebanese Nasserite parties under one leadership and is currently a member of the pro-Syrian March 8 Alliance.

== See also ==
- Al-Mourabitoun
- Lebanese Civil War
- United Nasserite Organization
- Popular Nasserist Organization
