= United Nasserite Organization =

Lebanese militia active during the Lebanese Civil War

United Nasserite Organization – UNO المنظمة الناصرية المتحدة
- Leader: (Unknown)
- Dates active: 1986–1991
- Headquarters: West Beirut
- Active regions: West Beirut, Cyprus
- Size: 100 fighters
- Wars: Lebanese Civil War

The United Nasserite Organization – UNO (Arabic: المنظمة الناصرية المتحدة | Al-Ittihad al-Tanzim al-Nasiri), also designated variously as 'Unified Nasserite Organization' and 'United Nasirite Organization', was a Lebanese underground guerrilla group responsible for two high-profile attacks on British military personnel in Cyprus during the late 1980s.

== Operations 1986-87 ==
Formed in April 1986 at West Beirut and funded by Libya, this little-known faction of about 50-100 fighters is suspected to be merely a cover for the National Revolutionary Command (Omar al-Mukhtar) or NRC-OM (Arabic: القيادة الثورية الوطنية (عمر المختار) | Al-Qiadat al-Thawriyat al-Wataniyya (Omar al-Makhtar)), an equally obscure Lebanon-based group also backed by Libya that perpetrated several armed actions against western interests in Lebanon and neighbouring Cyprus. The first action attributed to the UNO took place on 3 August 1986, when a small 'commando' team armed with small-arms, RPG-7s and light mortars attacked a group of British airmen on leave with their families in a beach near the Royal Air Force Akrotiri airbase, Cyprus, wounding two women. Later in August 1987 another party of UNO fighters ambushed a military vehicle on a Cipriote road, seriously wounding a British soldier and a civilian companion with light machine-gun fire.

== Decline and demise ==
The UNO/NRC has not claimed responsibility for any attacks since 1987, though it is likely that they remained active till the end of the civilian strife in Lebanon. The group is presumed to have been quietly de-activated due to Libyan pressure in the early 1990s and it is no longer operational.

== See also ==
- Al-Mourabitoun
- Lebanese Civil War
- List of weapons of the Lebanese Civil War
- Nasserist Unionists Movement
- Popular Nasserist Organization
