= Lebanese Liberation Front =

Lebanese underground terrorist group formed in February 1987

- جبهة التحرير اللبنانية
- Dates active: 1987–1989
- Ideology: Lebanese nationalism Anti-Assadism

The Lebanese Liberation Front (LLF; Arabic: جبهة التحرير اللبنانية transliterated as Jabhat al-Tahrir al-Lubnaniyya; French: Front de Liberation Libanais, FLL) was a Lebanese underground terrorist group of nationalist trend formed in February 1987.

== Activities 1987-1990 ==
Also designated the Lebanese Liberation Organization (LLO; Arabic: Al-Tanzim al-Tahrir al-Lubnaniyya; French: Organisation de Liberation Libanais, OLL) this mysterious organization appears to have combined a variety of grievances against Syria, Israel and United States policies over Lebanon. In the late 1980s the LLF/LLO was responsible for a series of guerrilla attacks directed against Syrian Army troops stationed in Lebanese territory and although their only single action carried outside the Middle East was in Canada, their motivations to attack a Canadian target and significance to the group's overall objectives remains unclear. The Lebanese Liberation Front ceased its guerrilla activities in 1989, though is presumed that it remained active at least until the mid-1990s.

== See also ==
- Lebanese Civil War
- Lebanese Forces (militia)
- Guardians of the Cedars
- Popular Revolutionary Resistance Organization
- Liberation Battalion
- Sons of the South
