= Popular Revolutionary Resistance Organization =

Lebanese Nationalist Armed Group

- التنظيم الثوري للمقاومة الشعبية
- Dates active: 1987–?
- Ideology: Lebanese nationalism Anti-Assadism

The Popular Revolutionary Resistance Organization – PRRO (Arabic: التنظيم الثوري للمقاومة الشعبية transliteration Al-Tanzim al-Thawri lil-Muqawama al-Sha'abiyah) or Organisation de la Resistance Populaire Révolutionnaire (OPPR) in French, was an anti-Syrian Lebanese nationalist underground terrorist group that emerged in March 1987, being responsible for a single combined bomb-and-rocket attack on a West Beirut hotel. Four residing Syrian intelligence officials were wounded in the course of action, and although the group warned of forthcoming attacks, little was heard of them since. It has been suggested that the PRRO was simply a cover for the Lebanese Liberation Front or a splinter faction, but is now considered to be inactive.

== See also ==
- Guardians of the Cedars
- Lebanese civil war
- Lebanese Forces (militia)
- Lebanese Liberation Front
- Liberation Battalion
- Sons of the South
