= Lebanese Movement in Support of Fatah =

Lebanese militia active during the Lebanese Civil War

Lebanese Movement in Support of Fatah الحركة اللبنانية لدعم فتح
- Leader: Usama Fakhuri
- Dates active: 1968 - ?
- Headquarters: West Beirut
- Active regions: West Beirut
- Part of: Lebanese National Movement
- Wars: Lebanese Civil War

The Lebanese Movement in Support of Fatah – LMSF (Arabic: الحركة اللبنانية لدعم فتح | Al-Harakat al-Lubnaniyyat li daem Fath) was established in 1968 by Dr. Usama Fakhuri, a second-rank Sunni politician opposed to leading Beirut Sunni za'im Saeb Salam. As its name implies, the LMSF received Fatah backing from the outset and joined the ranks of the Lebanese National Movement (LNM) in 1975.

== See also ==
- Lebanese Civil War
- Lebanese National Movement
- Palestine Liberation Organization
- List of weapons of the Lebanese Civil War
