= Sixth of February Movement =

Lebanese Nasserist Armed Group

Sixth of February Movement – 6th FM حركة السادس من فبراير
- Leader: Unknown
- Dates active: 1976-1986
- Headquarters: West Beirut
- Active regions: West Beirut
- Size: 250 fighters
- Part of: Lebanese National Movement
- Wars: Lebanese Civil War

The Sixth of February Movement or '6th FM' (Arabic: حركة السادس من فبراير | Harakat al-Sadis min Fibrayir) was a small, predominantly Sunni Nasserist political party and militia active in Lebanon from the early 1970s to the mid-1980s.

== Structure and organization ==
Based at West Beirut, the '6th FM' strength was estimated at 100–150 fighters armed and trained by the Palestine Liberation Organization (PLO).

== The Civil War years 1975–1986 ==
The '6th FM' joined the ranks of the Lebanese National Movement (LNM) and its military wing, the Joint Forces (LNM-JF), during the 1975–77 phase of the Lebanese Civil War, fighting alongside other Nasserist-oriented factions. However, the political collapse of the LNM in the wake of the June 1982 Israeli invasion of Lebanon and the subsequent departure of the PLO from Beirut meant that the smaller Nasserist militias ('6th FM' included) had to fend for themselves.

Their unwavering support for the PLO resulted in the adoption of a hostile stance regarding Syria's military presence in Lebanon and when the War of the Camps broke out at Beirut in May 1985, the '6th FM' allied itself with the pro-Arafat Palestinian refugee camp militias, the Al-Mourabitoun, the Communist Action Organization in Lebanon (OCAL), and the Kurdish Democratic Party – Lebanon (KDP-L) against a powerful coalition of Druze Progressive Socialist Party (PSP), Lebanese Communist Party (LCP), and Shia Muslim Amal movement militia forces backed by Syria, the Lebanese Army, and anti-Arafat dissident Palestinian guerrilla factions gathered into the Palestinian National Salvation Front (PNSF). Eventually, the '6th FM' bore the brunt of this all-out offensive until being finally suppressed by the Amal Movement in June 1986. This faction is no longer active.

== See also ==
- Amal Movement
- Al-Mourabitoun
- Lebanese National Movement
- Lebanese Civil War
- List of weapons of the Lebanese Civil War
- People's Liberation Army (Lebanon)
- Popular Guard
- War of the Camps
- 6th Infantry Brigade (Lebanon)
- 8th Infantry Brigade (Lebanon)
