= Sons of the South =

Lebanese Nationalist Militant Group

- أبناء العرقوب
- Dates active: 1987–1995
- Ideology: Lebanese nationalism Secularism
- Part of: Guardians of the Cedars; South Lebanon Army

The Sons of the South – SotS (Arabic: أبناء العرقوب transliterated Abna'a Al-Orkoub) were a small mixed religion militant faction based in southern Lebanon, active during the Lebanese Civil War.

== Activities 1983-1995 ==
Allegedly funded and trained by the Israel Defense Forces (IDF) intelligence service (Hebrew: Aman), and believed to be a mere cover for the Guardians of the Cedars (GoC) or the South Lebanon Army (SLA), the Sons of the South were formed in 1983 and usually operated in the Jabal Amil region close to the Israeli-controlled 'Security Zone'. The group emerged in July 1984, when they kidnapped Sheikh Mohammed Hassan Amin, a prominent Shi'ite cleric of Southern Lebanon whom the IDF accused of inciting guerrilla attacks on Israeli and SLA soldiers. Since this incident, the Sons of the South have not been held responsible for further terrorist attacks or kidnappings and it is believed that this group was disbanded around the mid-1990s, possibly by order of the Israeli authorities. They are no longer active.

== See also ==
- Guardians of the Cedars
- Lebanese Civil War
- Lebanese Forces
- Lebanese Liberation Front
- Liberation Battalion
- South Lebanon Army
- Popular Revolutionary Resistance Organization
