= Liberation Battalion =

Lebanese Nationalist Terrorist Group

Liberation Battalions
- أفواج التحرير
- Dates active: 1987–1988
- Ideology: Lebanese nationalism Secularism; Muslim-Christian Unity; Anti-Assadism

The Liberation Battalions – LB (Arabic: أفواج التحرير, transliteration Afwaj al-Tahrir) was a small, shadowy terrorist organization dedicated to attacking Syrian Army forces in Lebanon during the mid-late 1980s.

== Origins ==
Apparently a mixed Christian-Muslim group of unknown strength, it is believed that the Liberation Battalion was associated both with the larger Lebanese Islamic Resistance Movement – Hezbollah and the Christian Lebanese Forces militia (LF), but carried out its own actions independently. The Liberation Battalion released its manifesto soon after being formed in early October 1987, establishing their primary goal as an armed resistance movement to the perceived Syrian occupation of Lebanon. Other objectives included an end to sectarian violence and a negotiation towards terms of coexistence and mutual respect as well as complete independence from all foreign occupation or interference of any kind.

== Activities and decline ==
Operating mainly on the urban and sub-urban areas of Beirut, they claimed responsibility for at least ten guerrilla attacks targeting Syrian troops in Lebanon from October to December 1987, mostly through public statements made to the LF-controlled station Radio Free Lebanon. Such actions prompted a direct response by the Syrian military, usually in the form of raids on villages and neighbourhoods suspected of supporting the Liberation Battalion cause, particularly in West Beirut, where they rounded up hundreds of suspects. These waves of arrests may account for the sudden halt of the group’s activities and their subsequent disappearance by early 1988. They are now presumed inactive.

== See also ==
- Guardians of the Cedars
- Hezbollah
- Lebanese Civil War
- Lebanese Forces (militia)
- Lebanese Liberation Front
- Sons of the South
- Popular Revolutionary Resistance Organization
