= Syrian Social Nationalist Party in Lebanon =

Lebanese branch of the Syrian Social Nationalist Party

Syrian Social Nationalist Party الحزب السوري القومي الإجتماعي Parti social nationaliste syrien
- Abbreviation: SSNP-L
- General Secretary: Rabi Banat
- Founder: Antun Saadeh
- Founded: 1931
- Headquarters: Beirut
- Newspaper: Al Binaa
- Ideology: Fascism; Social nationalism; Syrian nationalism; Syrian irredentism; Economic populism; Anti-communism; Antisemitism
- Political position: Syncretic (Note: In the past, the party or elements of its ideology or membership have been referred to as belonging to both the political left and right, sometimes being labeled far-right.)
- National affiliation: March 8 Alliance
- Regional affiliation: PSOM (historical)
- Syrian counterpart: Syrian Social Nationalist Party
- Colours: Black, red and white
- Parliament of Lebanon: 0 / 128
- Cabinet of Lebanon: 0 / 30

Party flag

Website
- www.ssnp.com

The Syrian Social Nationalist Party in Lebanon (SSNP-L) (Note: Arabic: الحزب السوري القومي الاجتماعي في لبنان, ALA-LC: al-Ḥizb al-Sūrī al-Qawmī al-Ijtimāʻī fī Lubnān; French: Parti social nationaliste syrien au Liban or Parti populaire syrien) is a Syrian nationalist party operating in Lebanon. The Lebanese section of the Syrian Social Nationalist Party advocates subsuming Lebanon into a Greater Syrian nation state spanning the Fertile Crescent.

Founded in Beirut in 1932 as a national liberation organization hostile to French colonialism, the party played a significant role in Lebanese politics and was involved in attempted coup d'etats in 1949 and 1961 following which it was thoroughly repressed. It was active in the Lebanese Civil War, particularly in clashes with the right-wing Lebanese Front, resistance against the Israeli invasion of Lebanon in 1982 and in the South Lebanon conflict from 1985 to 2000 while also continuously supporting the Syrian occupation in Lebanon.

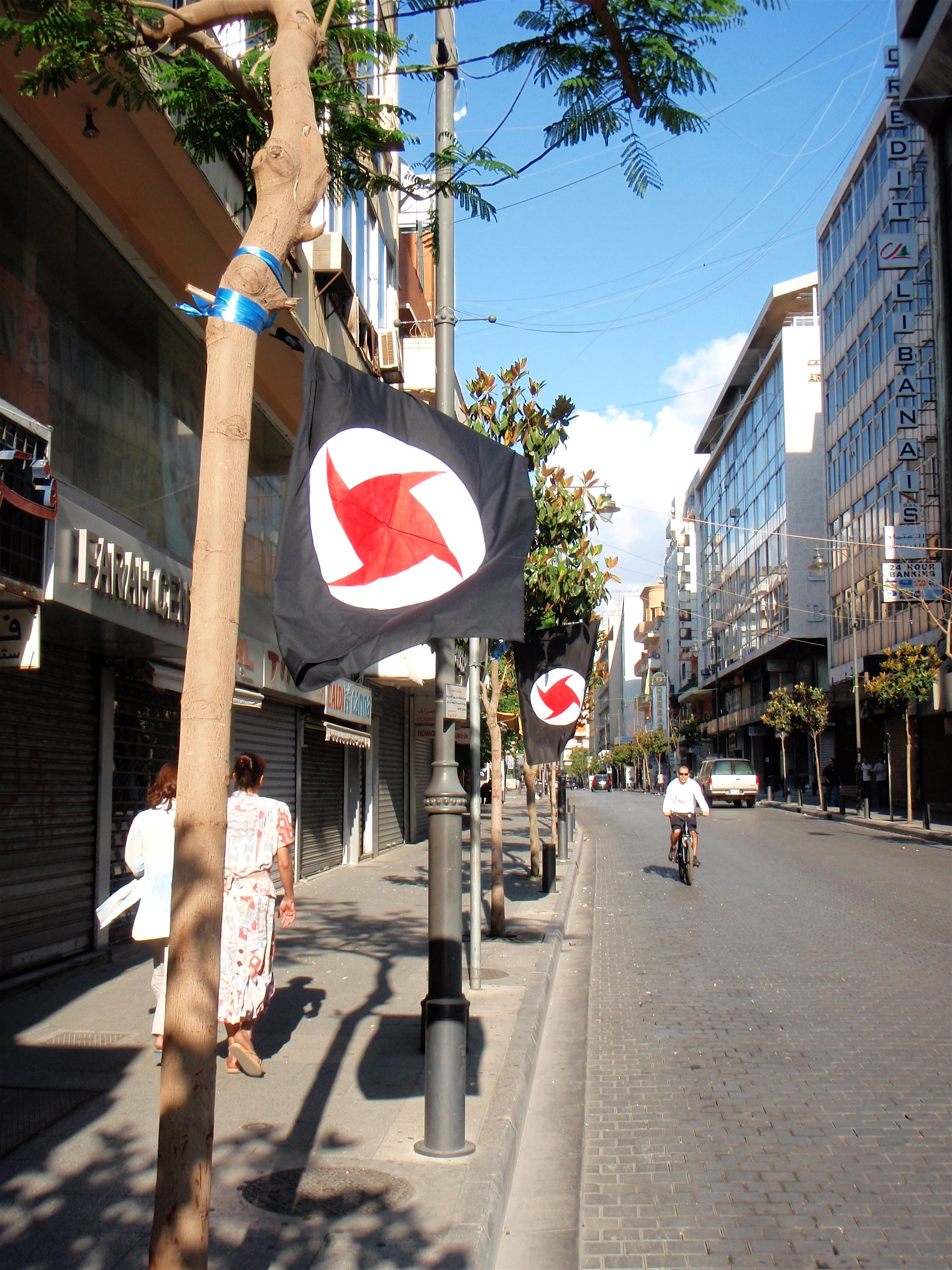
Flags of the Syrian Social Nationalist Party in Beirut on 9 May during the 2008 conflict in Lebanon

== Foundation and early years ==
The SSNP-L was founded in Lebanon by Antun Saadeh, a Syrian nationalist philosopher from the town of Dhour el Shweir. He had emigrated to Brazil in 1919 and was involved in both Arabic-language journalism and Syrian nationalist activity. He returned to Lebanon in 1930 where he was a journalist and German language teacher in the Syrian Protestant College

In November 1932, he secretly established the first nucleus of the Syrian Social Nationalist Party, which operated underground for the first three years of its existence. In 1933, it started publishing a monthly journal called Al-Majalla which was distributed in the American University of Beirut. The articles written in that journal and the speeches given by Saadeh consolidated the ideological basis of the party, and contributed to its popularity.

Its open hostility to colonialism led to six months in prison for creating a clandestine party in 1936. He was also accused in the trial of having been in contact with the fascist movements of Germany and Italy, but the charge was dropped as a letter was addressed from Germany denying any relationships. It is during his months in prison that Saadeh laid down the final ideological foundations of the party in The Genesis of Nations.

Saadeh emigrated again to Brazil in 1938 and afterwards to Argentina, only to return to Lebanon in 1947 following the country's independence from the French in 1943. By that time, the SSNP-L had grown exponentially and had clashed on many occasions with its primary ideological rival, the Lebanese nationalist Kataeb Party (also known as the "Phalange" or "Phalangists"), which was committed to the notion of Lebanon in its French borders.

Film in Arabic about Saadeh's return to Lebanon in 1947

The SSNP-L rejected this state of Lebanon on the basis that the borders outlining the newly created states were fictitious, resulting from colonialism, and do not reflect any historical and social realities. The party claimed that the region of Syria as defined by Saadeh represents the national ideal encompassing the historical people of Mesopotamia and the Fertile Crescent, bound together by a clearly defined geography and a common historical, social and cultural development path. Furthermore, and with the start of the Arab–Israeli conflict in 1948, Saadeh radicalized the party's Anti-Zionist stance by declaring that "Our struggle with the enemy is not a struggle for borders but for existence".

On 4 July 1949, a year after the declaration of the establishment of the state of Israel and the 1948 Arab–Israeli War, and as a response to a series of aggressions perpetrated by the Kataeb-backed central government, the SSNP-L attempted its first revolution. Following a violent crackdown by government forces, Saadeh traveled to Damascus to meet with Husni al-Za'im in an attempt to obtain his support, although he was handed over to Lebanese authorities, and executed on July the 8, 1949.

== From confrontation to accommodation: 1950–1960 ==
Following the execution of Saadeh and the arrest of its high-ranking leaders, the party remained underground until it started resurfacing with the events that transpired during the 1950–1960 period. With the outbreak of the Cold War and the rise of Marxist and communist influences supported by the USSR, the SSNP-L found itself facing a new ideological adversary, especially that most left-wing movements in the Middle-East rallied around Gamal Abd El Nasser and Arab nationalism. An ideological clash ensued, as Nasser and most left-wing organizations in the Arab world advocated Arab nationalism, the SSNP-L retained its commitment to Syrian nationalism.

The party objected to the declaration of The United Arab Republic between Egypt and Syria, and during the Lebanon crisis of 1958, party members sided with the government and then-president Camille Chamoun, fighting against the Arab nationalist rebels in northern Lebanon and in Mount Lebanon. The party was subsequently legalized.

== Second coup d'état and repression: 1961–1975 ==
On the last day of 1961, two SSNP-L members, company commanders in the Lebanese army, led an unsuccessful attempted lightning coup against President Fouad Chehab, supported by some 200 civilian SSNP-L members. In the scholarly literature, the coup has been explained as stemming from the party's ideological preference for violence ("bullets over ballots"), its frustration at exclusion from the Lebanese state, and both political and military criticism of the rule of Fouad Chehab.

This resulted in a renewed proscription and the imprisonment of many of its leaders. Most of the party's known activists remained in prison or exile until a general amnesty in 1969. In 1969, the party re-aligned towards Arab nationalism.

== The Lebanese Civil War: 1975–1990 ==
Syrian Social Nationalist Party
- Leaders: Inaam Raad; Abdallah Saadeh; Isaam Al Mahayri
- Dates active: 1958; 1975–1991
- Headquarters: Hamra Street (Beirut)
- Size: 10,000 fighters
- Part of: Lebanese National Movement; Lebanese National Resistance Front; Front of Patriotic and National Parties
- Wars: 1958 Lebanon crisis Lebanese Civil War; South Lebanon conflict (1985–2000)

With the outbreak of the Lebanese Civil War in 1975, the SSNP-L militias fought alongside the Arab nationalist and leftist forces allied in the Lebanese National Movement (LNM), against the Phalangists and their right-wing allies of the Lebanese Front. The SSNP-L conceived the Lebanese Civil War as the inevitable result of the divisions of the Syrian nation into small states such as Lebanon for the benefit of feudal leaders that would further fragment the nation into sectarian parcels and shun away from a liberation war against Israel, which the SSNP-L considered vital for the liberation-and-reclamation of Palestine, later to be known in SSNP-L dialect as "the occupied south of Greater Syria". The SSNP-L found its natural allies to be the Palestinian guerrillas, mainly Fatah and the PFLP as well as its former bitter enemies: the left-wing Arab nationalist movements, the Syrian Ba'ath Party, and the communists.

After the Israeli invasion of Lebanon in 1982 and subsequent rout of the leftist forces, a number of the leftist organizations regrouped to engage in resistance to the Israeli occupation. Along with the Lebanese Communist Party, the Communist Action Organization, and some smaller leftist groups, the SSNP-L played a prominent role in this. One of the best-known sparks of the resistance was the killing of two Israeli soldiers in the Wimpy Cafe on west Beirut's central Rue Hamra by party member Khalid Alwan. The party continues to commemorate this date. The FBI blames them for the assassination of Bachir Gemayel in 1982, the then-newly elected Lebanese President backed by the invading Israelis besieging Beirut.

In 1983, the party joined the Lebanese National Salvation Front established to oppose the abortive 17 May accord with Israel signed by Gemayel's brother and successor Amine Gemayel. Some party members were willing to sacrifice their lives through suicide attacks in resistance against Israel, the first being in 1985. A party member Sana'a Mehaidli, who committed a suicide attack at the age of 16 against an Israeli checkpoint in Lebanon, is considered "the progenitor of all female martyrs for the Palestinian cause". Diego Gambetta says that they can't be considered a terrorist organization because they only act against military targets, and that they should be considered a guerrilla organization.

== Post–civil war ==
In 2005, the pro-Syrian and anti-Cedar Revolution March 8 Alliance was formed, led by the Free Patriotic Movement and Hezbollah and including the SSNP-L. During the May 2008 conflict in Lebanon, the SSNP-L were aligned with March 8 against the Future Movement. At least 14 people were killed in the town of Halba, in the Akkar region of north Lebanon, as about 100 pro-Future Movement gunmen attacked an office of the SSNP-L. 10 of the dead were SSNP-L members, three were government loyalists and one was an Australian citizen of Lebanese descent on vacation in Lebanon, who was trying to get information at the SSNP-L offices about evacuating from the city. The Australian, Fadi Sheikh, reportedly had his hands and feet cut off. In November 2008, SSNP-L members in Beirut attacked (pro-Future Movement) Future TV journalist Omar Harqous, leading to demonstrations by hundreds.

In the 2018 Lebanese General Elections the SSNP-L fielded a total of 7 candidates participating in lists with various Lebanese 8 March alliance parties including: Hezbollah, Amal and the Free Patriotic Movement, securing two seats in the parliament. The Syrian Nationalist Party couldn't secure a single seat in 2022 Lebanese general elections.

== Ideology ==
The Ideology of the SSNP-L is a mixture of pan-Syrian nationalism, secularism and economic corporatism.

== Prominent politicians ==
- Assaad Hardan (Greek Orthodox)
- Marwan Fares (Greek Catholic)
- Ali Qanso (Shia Muslim)
- Gebran Areiji (Maronite)
- Mahmoud Abdel Khalek (Druze)
- Ghassan Ashqar (Maronite)
- Salim Saade (Greek Orthodox)

=== Legislative Elections ===
House of Representatives
Election year	# of overall votes	% of overall vote	# of overall seats won	+/–	Leader
1992	???? (#2)	???	6 / 128	▲6	
1996	???? (#3)	???	5 / 128	▼1	
2000	???? (#4)	???	4 / 128	▼1	
2005	???? (#10)	???	2 / 128	▼2	
2009	???? (#8)	???	2 / 128	Steady	
2018	23,881 (#10)	1.36%	3 / 128	▲1	
2022	11,621	0.64%	0 / 128	▼3	

== See also ==
- List of extrajudicial killings and political violence in Lebanon
- 1975 Beirut bus massacre
- Eagles of the Whirlwind
- Lebanese Civil War
- List of armed groups in the Syrian Civil War
- Mountain War (Lebanon)
