= Lebanese National Movement =

Front of pan-Arab nationalist parties active during the Lebanese Civil War

Lebanese National Movement الحركة الوطنية اللبنانية
- Leaders: Walid Jumblatt; George Hawi; Mohsen Ibrahim; Assem Qanso; Inaam Raad
- Dates active: 1969–1982
- Groups: Al-Mourabitoun; Progressive Socialist Party (PSP); Lebanese Communist Party (LCP); Syrian Social Nationalist Party in Lebanon (SSNP); Communist Action Organization in Lebanon (CAOL) (Palestine) Lebanese Movement in Support of Fatah (LMSF); Arab Socialist Ba'ath Party – Lebanon Region; Revolutionary Communist Group; Sixth of February Movement; Socialist Arab Lebanon Vanguard Party (SALVP); Popular Nasserist Organization (PNO); Toilers League; Lebanese Arab Army (LAA); Other minor organizations
- Active regions: Throughout Lebanon
- Ideology: Socialism; Communism; Marxism-Leninism; Secularism; Arab nationalism Lebanese nationalism Nasserism; Neo-Ba'athism; Ba'athism; Nonsectarianism; Pan-Arabism; Anti-Zionism; Syrian nationalism Left-wing nationalism
- Political position: Left-wing to far-left
- Size: 18,700 (1975); 46,900 (1976) (including allied PLO fighters)
- Wars: Lebanese Civil War

The Lebanese National Movement (LNM; Arabic: الحركة الوطنية اللبنانية, romanized: al-Ḥarakat al-Waṭaniyya al-Lubnāniyya) was a front of left-wing, pan-Arabist and Syrian nationalist parties and organizations active during the early years of the Lebanese Civil War, which supported the Palestine Liberation Organization (PLO). It was headed by Kamal Jumblatt, a prominent Druze leader of the Progressive Socialist Party (PSP). The Vice-President was Inaam Raad, leader of the Syrian Social Nationalist Party and Assem Qanso of the pro-Syrian Lebanese Arab Socialist Ba'ath Party. The general secretary of the LNM was Mohsen Ibrahim, leader of the Communist Action Organization in Lebanon (CAOL).

The LNM was one of two main coalitions during the first rounds of fighting in the Lebanese Civil War, the other being the militias of the mainly Christian Lebanese Front, which comprised the nationalist Phalange, the National Liberal Party, as well as parts of the Maronite-dominated central government.

== Composition ==
The Lebanese National Movement had its genesis in a previous organization, the Front of National and Progressive Parties and Forces – FNPPF (Arabic: Jabhat al-Ahzab wa al-Quwa al-Taqaddumiyya wa al-Wataniyya) or Front for Progressive Parties and National Forces (FPPNF), also known as the Revisionist Front, an alliance of anti-status quo political parties originally formed in 1969, which later ran in the 1972 general elections on a reformist secular platform. Overwhelmingly left-wing and Pan-Arabist in both its composition and orientation, the LNM claimed to be a "democratic, progressive and non-sectarian" broad organization that gathered parties and organizations opposing the Maronite-dominated sectarian order in Lebanon. It was reorganized as the Lebanese National Movement (LNM) in the 1970s, and led by Kamal Jumblatt as the main force on the anti-government side in the early years of the Lebanese Civil War.

Among the members were the Progressive Socialist Party (PSP), the Syrian Social Nationalist Party (SSNP), the Lebanese Communist Party (LCP) and several Nasserist and Marxist groups. It was also joined by Palestinian factions based in Lebanon's refugee camps, mainly from the Rejectionist Front.

=== Membership and political organization ===
Its membership was overwhelmingly left-wing and professed to be secular, although the fairly obvious sectarian appeal of Jumblatt's Progressive Socialist Party (PSP) and some of the Sunni Arab nationalist organizations in some cases made this claim debatable. However, to say that the LNM was an all-Muslim organization would be a gross oversimplification. Its main ideological positions were: the abrogation of sectarianism, political and social reforms, the clear proclamation of the Arab identity of Lebanon, and increased support for the Palestinians. In order to coordinate the military and political actions of the LNM an executive structure, the Central Political Council – CPC (Arabic: Majliss Tajammu al-kinda) or Bureau Politique Central (BPC) in French, was set up shortly after the outbreak of the hostilities at the town of Aley, a mountain tourist resort in the Chouf District, which became the military headquarters of the Front. The Council was presided over from its inception by Kamal Jumblatt of the PSP, with Mohsen Ibrahim of the OCAL appointed as Executive Secretary; after Kamal's death in 1977, he was replaced by his son Walid Jumblatt, who led the LNM until 1982.

Among the participants in the LNM were the Lebanese Communist Party (LCP), the Communist Action Organization in Lebanon (CAOL or OCAL), the PSP, the Syrian Social Nationalist Party in Lebanon (SSNP), both a Syrian-led Ba'ath Party branch and an Iraqi-led Ba'ath Party branch, al-Mourabitoun (a Nasserist group) and several other minor Nasserist and Marxist groupings. Several Palestinian organizations joined the LNM, notably many from the Rejectionist Front. Both the Popular Front for the Liberation of Palestine (PFLP) and the Democratic Front for the Liberation of Palestine (DFLP) were active participants.

The Shia Amal Movement, although supporting some of the LNM's positions, did not join it formally.

=== Minor groups ===
Above and beyond this, an 'alphabet soup' of other lesser-known smaller Parties were associated with the LNM.

- Revolutionary Communist Group – RCG
- the Lebanese Revolutionary Party – LRP
- the Front of Patriotic Christians – PFC
- the Democratic Lebanese Movement – DLM
- the Movement of Arab Lebanon – MAL
- the Arab Revolutionary Movement – ARM
- the Partisans of the Revolution
- the Vanguards of Popular Action – VPA
- the Organization of Arab Youth – OAY
- the Units of the Arab Call – UAC
- the Movement of Arab Revolution – MAR
- the Sixth of February Movement
- the 24 October Movement – 24 OM
- the Lebanese Movement in Support of Fatah – LMSF
- the Union of Working People's Forces – UWPF
- the Union of Working People's Forces-Corrective Movement – UWPF-CM
- the Knights of Ali
- the Black Panthers

Most of them were marginal political organizations of revolutionary or populist trend (Arab nationalist, libertarian/anarchist, liberal/idealist, radical socialist, Marxist–Leninist, Hoxhaist, Trotskyist, or Maoist) that emerged in the late 1960s and early 1970s, and despite their rather limited base of support, they were quite active. Anti-status quo, Pan-Arabist, and pro-Palestinian in policy, they strived for a social revolution that would transform Lebanese society, therefore sharing the same objectives as the leading LNM secular parties – the recognition of Lebanon as an Arab country and unwavering support for the PLO.

However, apart this minority of committed idealists, the vast majority of the remainder 'movements' were actually façades or 'shops' (Arabic: dakakin) – slightly politicised neighbourhood militias operating under grandiose pseudo-revolutionary labels – set up by PLO factions (mainly Fatah) in a misguided effort to widen its base of local support among the unemployed Lebanese urban youth. In most cases, their small, poorly disciplined, ill-equipped militia establishments were ad hoc formations made of lightly armed and largely untrained Christian or Muslim youths that rarely surpassed the 100-300 fighters' mark – about the size of an understrength company or battalion. Some groupings were lucky enough to possess a few technicals armed with heavy machine-guns and recoilless rifles but others, for the most part, fought on foot as light infantry, with small arms pilfered from the government forces, acquired on the black market or obtained via the Palestinian factions. Those groups either unable or unwilling to raise their own militias played a political role only by engaging in propaganda activities, keeping themselves out of the 1975-76 savage street battles and sectarian killings, with some of their militants preferring instead to join the medical relief agencies organized by the LNM.

The decline of the LNM in the late 1970s, culminating in its collapse in the aftermath of the Israeli invasion of June 1982, sounded the death toll for many of the minor Lebanese leftist organizations. As the war progressed, many of these small factions – at least the more politically oriented ones – were destroyed in the violent power struggles of the 1980s. For the most part forced to go underground, some evolved to Islamic fundamentalist groups, whilst the less politicized simply degenerated into criminal street-gangs that engaged in assassinations, theft, smuggling, and extortion. As a result, only a small fraction of the truly ideologically committed groupings managed to survive the war to re-emerge in the 1990s as politically active organizations.

=== Military strength and organization ===
At the beginning of the war in 1975, the different LNM militias were grouped into a military wing, designated the "Common Forces" (Arabic: القوات المشتركة, Al-Quwwat al-Mushtaraka), but best known as "Joint Forces" (LNM-JF), which numbered some 18,900 militiamen (not including allied Palestinian factions). Manpower was distributed as follows: the PSP militia (the People's Liberation Army) and the LCP militia (the Popular Guard) each had 5,000 men; the SSNP militia had 4,000 men; the pro-Syria Ba'athists and pro-Iraqi Ba'athists had 2,000 and 1,500 men respectively. The others militias shared the remainder.

This number was to increase in the following months with the inclusion of 21,900 Palestinian guerrilla fighters from both the Rejectionist Front (RF) and mainstream PLO factions, later joined by 4,400 Lebanese regular soldiers from the Lebanese Arab Army (LAA) led by Lieutenant Ahmad al-Khatib who went over to the LNM-PLO side in January 1976. In the end, the LNM-PLO-LAA combined military forces reached an impressive total of 45,200 troops by March that year, aligned against the 12,000-16,000 right-wing troops their Lebanese Front adversaries were able to muster.

Breakdown of the manpower of the LNM's main groups in 1975
| Group | Manpower |
|---|---|
| LCP (Popular Guard) | 5,000 |
| PSP (PLA) | 5,000 |
| SSNP-L | 4,000 |
| Pro-Syrian Baath | 2,000 |
| Pro-Iraqi Baath | 1,500 |
| Remaining militias | 1,400 |
| Total | 18,900 |
| Lebanese Arab Army | 4,400 |
| PLO & Rejectionist Front | 21,900 |
| Total | 45,200 |

=== Sponsor countries and organizations ===
The LNM-JF received financial aid and arms from many countries such as Syria, Libya, Iraq and South Yemen, in addition to Palestinian support; besides lending their political backing and contributing with their organizational skills, experienced Palestinian cadres from RF and PLO groups provided weapons, equipment, and in many cases, military leadership to the Lebanese leftist militias. In addition, they also provided training, which was conducted at the refugee camps in the major cities or at PLO bases in southern Lebanon, mainly in the Beqaa Valley (a.k.a. "Fatahland").

== Participation in the Lebanese Civil War 1975-1982 ==
As fighting escalated, the LNM allied itself with the umbrella Palestine Liberation Organization (PLO), and by early 1976 the LNM controlled 80% of Lebanon's territory. But as its relations with Damascus deteriorated, the pro-Syrian Ba'ath branch, Union of Working People's Forces and an important SSNP faction left the movement, and formed alongside Amal Movement the Front of Patriotic and National Parties.

In June 1976, the Syrian Army, fearing that a Palestinian victory would weaken its own strategic position, received a request from the Lebanese Front to intervene on their behalf. After strong initial resistance, the LNM/PLO forces began losing ground, and once the Arab states eventually approved the Syrian intervention after the Cairo and Riyadh conferences, the common forces accepted a cease-fire. The Syrian Army then took the role of peace-keepers, as part of Arab League's Arab Deterrent Force (ADF), between the belligerents. In 1977, Walid Jumblatt became the head of the LNM after the murder of his father Kamal, in an ambush widely accredited to either pro-Syrian Palestinian militants or Lebanese SSNP agents working for the Syrian intelligence services. Despite this, Walid aligned himself with Syria, and maintained a good working relationship with Syrian President Hafez al-Assad (who had shared with his father a mutual distrust).

In 1978 the Israeli Operation Litani in southern Lebanon was partly directed against LNM militias, then fighting alongside the PLO after relations improved with Syria. In June 1982, the Movement was virtually dissolved after the Israeli invasion of Lebanon. On 16 September 1982, following Israel's occupation of west Beirut and the Sabra and Shatila Massacre, the LMM's successor was formed by Walid Jumblatt as the Lebanese National Resistance Front – LNRF (Arabic: جبهة المقاومة الوطنية اللبنانية, Jabhat al-Muqawama al-Wataniyya al-Lubnaniyya), which commenced guerrilla operations against the Israel Defense Forces (IDF) in September of that same year.

== See also ==
- Lebanese Civil War
- List of extrajudicial killings and political violence in Lebanon
- Front of Patriotic and National Parties
- History of Lebanon
- Lebanese Front
- Lebanese National Resistance Front
- People's Liberation Army (Lebanon)
