= Popular Guard =

Military wing of the Lebanese Communist Party

Popular Guard الحرس الشعبي
- Flag of the Lebanese Communist Party since 1924
- Leaders: George Hawi; Elias Atallah
- Dates active: 1958; 1970–1990; 2006
- Headquarters: Zarif (Beirut); Hula (Southern Lebanon)
- Active regions: Beirut, Akkar District, Koura District, Bekaa Valley, Southern Lebanon
- Size: 5,000 fighters
- Part of: Lebanese Communist Party; Lebanese National Movement; Lebanese National Resistance Front
- Wars: 1958 Lebanon crisis; Lebanese Civil War; South Lebanon conflict (1985–2000); 2006 Lebanon War

The Popular Guard or Popular Guards – PG (Arabic: الحرس الشعبي | Al-Ḥarās al-Shaʿabī) and Garde Populaire in French, was the military wing of the Lebanese Communist Party (LCP). It fought in the 1975–1977 phase of the Lebanese Civil War and subsequent conflicts. The LCP and its militia were members of the Lebanese National Movement (LNM) and its successor, the Lebanese National Resistance Front (LNRF).

== Origins ==
The LCP's military wing was not only well-organized, but also one of the largest secular and non-sectarian militias in Lebanon. It was first founded unofficially during the 1958 civil war, fighting alongside the anti-government forces against the Lebanese Army and the allied Christian militias. Disbanded upon the conclusion of the war, in early 1969 the Party's Politburo decided to quietly raise a new militia force ostensibly to help defend the border villages located in South Lebanon. The reality, however, was more complex. Like other political groups in Lebanon, the LCP realized in the early 1970s that without an armed militia it would lose its political relevance. Thus the "Popular Guard" was officially established on January 6, 1970, ostensibly in response to the occupation of Kfar Kila and Houla villages in the Jabal Amel region of southern Lebanon and the kidnapping of local villagers by the Israeli Defence Forces (IDF).

Prior to the war, the Popular Guards initially received covert support from the Palestine Liberation Organization (PLO), the USSR, Syria, Iraq, Libya and from well-connected left-wing sympathizers in Jordan, and some Eastern Bloc Countries, such as East Germany. Furthermore, the LCP started sending its militiamen to training camps in Jordan under the control of the Palestinian Fatah, the Popular Front for the Liberation of Palestine (PFLP) and the Jordanian Communist Party (JCP). Moreover, the LCP's links with the Iraqi Communist Party (ICP) and the Syrian Communist Party (SCP) led them to forge close ties with the Ba'athist Iraqi and Syrian Governments to help train militants and purchase high-tech soviet arms.

== Military structure and organization ==
Initially made up of just 600–700 poorly armed militiamen, by mid-1976 the Popular Guard's ranks had swelled to some 5,000 men and women (though other sources list a smaller number, about 3,000), this total comprising 2,000–2,500 full-time fighters and 2,500–3,000 irregulars, mostly drawn from its youth branch organization, the Union of Lebanese Democratic Youth (ULDY), which had been established in early 1970. Organized into infantry, signals, artillery, medical and Military Police 'branches', the LCP militia was first headed by the Greek Orthodox George Hawi (whose nom de guerre was Abu Anis), but in 1979 PG command was passed on to Elias Atallah, a Maronite. Although it was active mostly in West Beirut and Tripoli, the LCP/PG also kept underground cells at the Koura District, and the Sidon, Tyre and Nabatieh Districts of the Jabal Amel region of southern Lebanon.

== Illegal activities and controversy ==
The LCP/PG was mainly financed by the USSR and Syria, though it also received revenues from other 'unofficial' sources within Lebanon. In the mid-1980s, allied with the Red Knights militia of the Alawite Arab Democratic Party (ADP), they helped the latter to control Tripoli's commercial harbour and oil refinery – the second large deep-waters port of Lebanon – in collusion with the director of the city’s harbour Ahmad Karami and corrupt Syrian Army officers. The National Fuel Company (NFC) headed jointly by businessmen Maan Karami (brother of late prime-minister Rachid Karami) and Haj Muhammad Awadah, run in their behalf a profitable fuel smuggling ring that stretched to the Beqaa Valley.

== The Popular Guards' in the 1975–1990 civil war ==
After the return of George Hawi, the Popular Guard joined the Lebanese National Movement (LNM) – PLO Joint Forces. The LCP militia was soon involved in many street battles against the Christian right-wing militias of the Lebanese Front. On October 24, 1975, the Popular Guards fought alongside other LNM militias such as the Al-Mourabitoun and the Nasserite Correctionist Mouvement (NCM), the Lebanese Arab Army (LAA) and the PLO at the Battle of the Hotels in Downtown Beirut, where they engaged the Lebanese Front militias and the Army of Free Lebanon (AFL).

Following the Israeli invasion of Lebanon of June 1982, the LCP/PG went underground, participating actively in the formation of the Lebanese National Resistance Front (LNRF) guerrilla alliance in September that year and later joining the LNSF in July 1983. They fought at the 1983–84 Mountain War allied with the Druze People's Liberation Army (PLA) of the Progressive Socialist Party (PSP), Al-Mourabitoun and Syrian Socialist Nationalist Party (SSNP) militias in the Chouf District and at West Beirut against the Christian Lebanese Forces (LF) militia, the Lebanese Army and the Multinational Force in Lebanon (MNF).

When the War of the Camps broke out on April–May 1985 at West Beirut, it saw the LCP/PG participating – albeit reluctantly – in a military coalition that gathered the Druze PSP/PLA, and the Shia Muslim Amal Movement, backed by Syria, the Lebanese Army, and anti-Arafat dissident Palestinian guerrilla factions against an alliance of PLO refugee camp militias, the Nasserite Al-Mourabitoun and Sixth of February Movement militias, the Communist Action Organization in Lebanon (OCAL), and the Kurdish Democratic Party – Lebanon (KDP-L).

In December 1986, the Popular Guards joined the Arab Democratic Party (ADP), SSNP and Ba'ath Party militias in another military coalition backed by the Syrian Army, which contributed to the decisive defeat of the Sunni Muslim Islamic Unification Movement at the Battle of Tripoli.

=== Resistance to the Israeli occupation ===
On September 16, 1982, the Secretary-General of the LCP George Hawi and the Secretary-General of the OCAL Muhsin Ibrahim announced the creation of the LNRF, which rallied several Lebanese leftist and Pan-Arabist parties and armed factions to fight the Israeli occupation of southern Lebanon.

Popular Guard underground guerrilla cells continued to operate in the Jabal Amel after the end of the civil war, fighting until 2000 alongside the Shia Hezbollah and other Lebanese armed groups against the Israel Defense Forces (IDF) and their South Lebanese Army (SLA) proxies in the Israeli-controlled "security zone."

== List of combat operations ==
- The 1958 civil war against right-wing Christian militias
- The Battle of the Hotels (Part of 2 years war) against the Lebanese Front
- The 1978 South Lebanon conflict against the Israeli Defence Forces
- The 1982 Lebanon War and Siege of Beirut against the Israeli Defence Forces, the Lebanese Forces, and the South Lebanon Army
- The Mountain War against the Lebanese Forces, the Lebanese Army and the Multinational Force in Lebanon
- The Battle of Tripoli against the Islamic Unification Movement and other radical Islamist factions
- The 2006 Lebanon War alongside Hezbollah and Amal movement against the Israeli Defence Forces

== Weapons and equipment ==
The collapse of the Lebanese Armed Forces (LAF) and Internal Security Forces (ISF) in January 1976 allowed the LCP/PG to seize some weapons and vehicles from their barracks and police stations, though most of its weaponry, heavy vehicles and other, non-lethal military equipments were procured in the international black market or supplied by the PLO, Syria, East Germany, Czechoslovakia, Bulgaria, Romania and the USSR.

=== Pistols ===
- TT pistol
- Makarov pistol
- M1911A1 pistol
- CZ 75

=== Submachine guns ===
- Škorpion vz. 61
- MP 40

=== Carbines and Assault Rifles ===
- M1 Garand
- StG 44
- Mosin–Nagant
- MAS-49 rifle
- SKS
- AK-47 assault rifle (Other variants included the AKM, Zastava M70, AK-63, AK-74, AK-103, Chinese Type 56, Romanian AIM and former East German MPi assault rifles)
- FN FAL
- FN CAL
- Heckler & Koch G3
- M16A1

=== Machine guns and autocannons ===
- RPK Light machine gun
- RPD Light machine gun
- DP-28 Light machine gun
- SG-43 Goryunov
- PK General-purpose machine gun
- Type 67 General-purpose machine gun
- Rheinmetall MG 3 General-purpose machine gun
- M1919A4 General-purpose machine gun
- DShKM 12.7 mm Heavy machine gun (Mainly mounted on Technicals)
- NSV 12.7 mm Heavy machine gun taken off from disabled tanks (Mainly mounted on Technicals)
- KPV 14.5 mm Heavy machine gun (mounted on Technicals)
- ZPU (ZPU-1, ZPU-2, ZPU-4) 14.5 mm Anti-aircraft guns (Mainly mounted on Technicals and Gun trucks)

=== Sniper rifles ===
- Dragunov SVD-63 rifle
- PSL (rifle)
- Gepard anti-materiel rifles
- M40 rifle
- Steyr SSG 69
- PTRS-41 14.5mm anti-tank rifle (used for heavy sniping)

=== Rocket launchers and grenade systems ===
- RPG-7 shoulder-launched, anti-tank rocket-propelled grenade launcher
- RPG-2 shoulder-launched, anti-tank rocket-propelled grenade launcher
- Type 69 RPG shoulder-launched, anti-tank rocket-propelled grenade launcher
- F1 hand grenade
- RGD-5 hand grenade

=== Mortars ===
- M2 mortar

=== Artillery ===
- B-10 recoilless rifle
- M40 recoilless rifle (mounted on Technicals)
- 122 mm howitzer 2A18 (D-30)
- Type 63 multiple rocket launcher (mounted on Technicals)
- BM-21 Grad 122 mm multiple rocket launcher

=== Vehicles ===
- Jeep CJ-5 and CJ-8
- UAZ-469
- Land-Rover series II-III
- Range Rover (First generation) SUV
- Toyota Land Cruiser (J40)
- Peugeot 504 pickup truck
- GAZ-66 light truck
- Chevrolet C-50 medium-duty truck
- Dodge F600 medium-duty truck
- GMC C4500 medium-duty truck
- GMC C7500 heavy-duty cargo truck

Many of these vehicles were employed as Technicals and Gun trucks, armed with DShkM, NSV, KPV, ZPU, ZU-23-2, and M40.

== Uniforms and insignia ==
=== Fatigue clothing ===
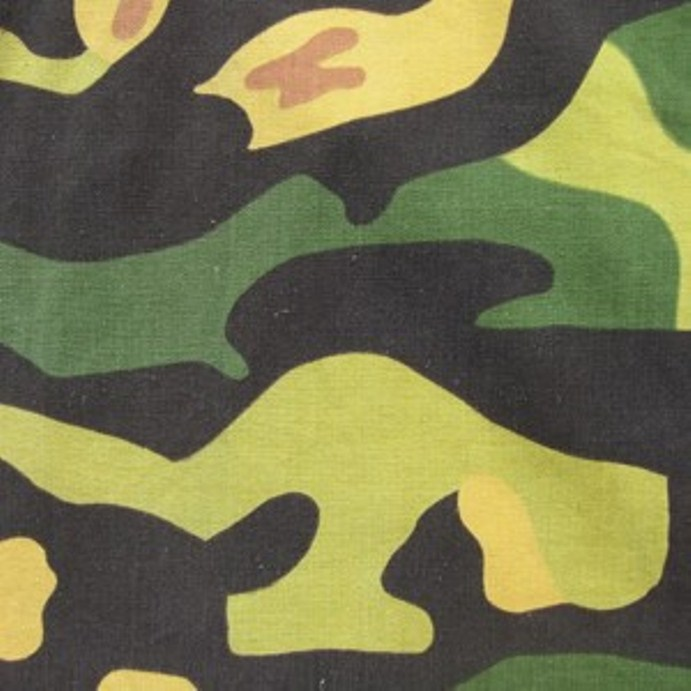
LCP/Popular Guards Czechoslovak Vz 60 "Salamander" (Mlok) pattern.

Popular Guard militiamen wore in the field ex-Lebanese Army Olive Green fatigues (a special domestic variant of the US Army OG-107 cotton sateen utilities), locally produced PLO copies of Iraqi Army OG and light Khaki fatigues, surplus Belgian Army M64 and Spanish Army M82 OG fatigues, captured Israeli Olive Drab Uniform "B" (Hebrew: Madei Bet) fatigues, and civilian clothes, or a mix of both.

Camouflage uniforms were also worn, namely Syrian or PLO Lizard and Czechoslovak Vz 60 "Salamander" (Mlok) patterns, and Lebanese Army Lizard-style pattern (colloquially nicknamed mlukhiyah, a.k.a. molokhia or molohiya) fatigues; the latter was a unique Lebanese-designed pattern which incorporated dense vertical stripes of dark brown and olive green on a pinkish-tan or khaki background. Originally developed in the late 1960s or early 1970s for the Lebanese Commando Regiment, this pattern saw widespread usage with the Christian-rightist Lebanese Front and Muslim-leftist Lebanese National Movement militias. Later in the War, Popular Guard fighters provided themselves with Iraqi Highland pattern (a.k.a. "Iraqi Woodland") fatigues and captured Lebanese Army U.S. Woodland BDUs or locally produced cheap copies. Civilian or surplus military Parkas, OG US M-1965 field jackets and Iraqi copies of the olive-brown woollen Jordanian Commando Sweater were worn in cold weather.

=== Headgear ===
Usual headgear consisted of ex-Lebanese Army OG Baseball caps, Soviet M-38 Field Hats in mustard khaki cotton (Russian: Panamanka), and black or red berets worn French-style, pulled to the left; a black-and-white or red-and-white kaffiyeh was also worn around the neck as a foulard. Knitted woollen caps, military commando caps, Fleece caps, fur-lined cloth bomber hats and Ushanka-style black or brown fur hats were worn in the winter.

=== Footwear ===
Black leather combat boots initially came from Lebanese Army stocks, the US Army M-1967 model with DMS "ripple" pattern rubber sole and the French Army "Rangers" BM65 (French: Rangers de l'Armée Française BM65) with double-buckle ankle cuff or were provided by the PLO and the Syrians, complemented by high-top Pataugas olive canvas-and-rubber patrol boots. Several models of civilian sneakers or "trainers" and "chucks", were also used by Popular Guard fighters.

=== Accoutrements ===
Web gear consisted of Soviet three-cell and four-cell AK-47 magazine pouches in khaki or olive green canvas, East German "raindrop" camouflage four-cell AK-47/AKM magazine pouches, ChiCom Type 56 AK, Type 56 SKS, Type 63 SKS and Type 81 AK chest rigs in Khaki or Olive Green cotton fabric for the AK-47 assault rifle and the SKS semi-automatic rifle, plus several variants of locally made, multi-pocket chest rigs and assault vests in camouflage cloth, Khaki and OG canvas or Nylon. In addition, the US Army M-1956 load-carrying equipment (LCE) in Khaki cotton canvas and the all-purpose lightweight individual carrying equipment (ALICE) in OG Nylon captured from the Lebanese Army, and IDF Olive Green Nylon Ephod Combat Vests seized either from the Lebanese Forces (LF) or the South Lebanon Army (SLA) were also widely used.

Anti-tank teams issued with the RPG-2 and RPG-7 rocket launchers received the correspondent Soviet rocket bag models in Khaki canvas, the gunner backpack 6SH12, the assistant gunner backpack and the munitions bag 6SH11; Polish and East German versions in rubberized canvas were employed as well.

== In popular culture ==
Popular Guard fighters are featured on 1970s archived TV news footage in the episode of the 2018 Al Jazeera English War Hotels documentary series dedicated to the Holiday Inn Hotel in west Beirut.

== See also ==
- Anwar Yassin
- George Hawi
- Arab Democratic Party
- Lebanese Civil War
- List of extrajudicial killings and political violence in Lebanon
- Lebanese Communist Party
- List of weapons of the Lebanese Civil War
- Souha Bechara
- People's Liberation Army (Lebanon)
- War of the Camps
