= Lebanese National Resistance Front =

Leftist militant alliance in the Lebanese Civil War

- Leaders: George Hawi; Mahdi Amel; Elias Atallah; Mohsen Ibrahim; Walid Jumblatt; Inaam Raad; Hussein Hamdan
- Dates active: 1982–1999
- Groups: Lebanese Communist Party (LCP)/Popular Guard; Organization of Communist Action in Lebanon (OCAL); Progressive Socialist Party (PSP)/ People's Liberation Army (PLA); Arab Socialist Action Party – Lebanon (ASAP–L); Arab Socialist Ba'ath Party – Lebanon Region; Syrian Social Nationalist Party in Lebanon (SSNP–L)/Eagles of the Whirlwind; Lebanese Armed Revolutionary Factions (LARF); Popular Nasserist Organization (PNO); Arab Democratic Party (ADP)
- Headquarters: Beirut; Kfar Reman
- Active regions: Beirut; Mount Lebanon; Southern Lebanon; Jabal Amil; West Beqaa; Rashaya
- Ideology: Arab nationalism Lebanese nationalism Marxism–Leninism; Anti-Zionism; Revolutionary socialism Nasserism; Arab socialism Pan-Arabism; Neo-Ba'athism; Anti-imperialism; Secularism; Syrian nationalism Left-wing nationalism
- Political position: Left-wing to far-left
- Size: 25,000 fighters
- Wars: Lebanese Civil War; South Lebanon conflict (1985–2000)
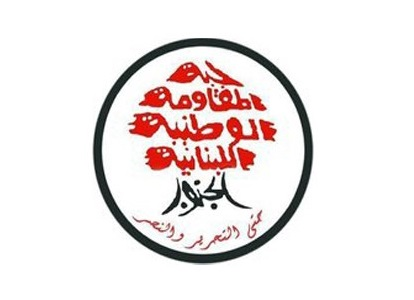
- Flag

The Lebanese National Resistance Front (LNRF; Arabic: جبهة المقاومة الوطنية اللبنانية, romanized: Jabhat al-Muqawama al-Wataniyya al-Lubnaniyya), best known by its Arabic acronym, ‘Jammoul’ (جمول), was a leftist alliance led by Walid Jumblatt’s Progressive Socialist Party, active in Lebanon from the 1982-1990 phase of the Civil War. It acted as a successor to the Lebanese National Movement, which ceased to exist after the Israeli invasion of Lebanon.

== Origins ==
This organization was founded on September 16, 1982, the same day the Israeli army entered West Beirut. The secretary general of the central committee of the Lebanese Communist Party (LCP) George Hawi, the secretary general of the Organization of Communist Action – Lebanon (OCAL) Mohsen Ibrahim, the Arab Socialist Action Party – Lebanon (ASAP-L) secretary general Hussein Hamdan, the Arab Socialist Ba'ath Party – Lebanon Region, and the Syrian Social Nationalist Party in Lebanon (SSNP) issued that day a joint communiqué calling for the Lebanese people to raise up in arms and unite into a "Lebanese National Resistance Front" against the Israeli Occupation.

The pro-Syrian Arab Democratic Party (ADP) and the Lebanese Armed Revolutionary Factions (LARF) rallied to the LNRF banner, which gained support of Palestine Liberation Organization (PLO) leftist and Marxist factions based in Lebanon, mainly from the Popular Front for the Liberation of Palestine (PFLP) and the Democratic Front for the Liberation of Palestine (DFLP).

== Structure and organization ==
The LNRF did not have the strength of other larger militant groups in Lebanon. It was estimated at some 200–500 or so fighters drawn from the LCP, OCAL, LABP, ADP, LARF, PFLP and DFLP, placed under the overall command of Elias Atallah. A joint operational HQ was established at the village of Kfar Reman in the Jabal Amil region of southern Lebanon, with Hawi and Ibrahim meeting daily to coordinate the activities of the Front's underground cells at west Beirut, Sidon, Tyre and Nabatieh in southern Lebanon.

Most observers believe that the Front was a pro-Syrian organization whose membership was primarily Lebanese. However, the PLO stated that the actions claimed by the LNRF were actually carried out by isolated Palestinian guerrilla cells and some radical Lebanese leftists who supported them.

== Activities: 1982–85 ==
The LNRF carried out attacks against the IDF and Israeli-related targets in Beirut, Mount Lebanon and the South in June, July and August 1983. At this point it was known as the Lebanese National Salvation Front and was backed by Syria.

== Decline and demise: 1986–2000 ==
A considerable number of LNRF fighters were killed in combat while fighting Israeli and South Lebanon Army (SLA) troops, whereas militants such as Anwar Yassin and Soha Bechara were taken prisoner and held in the Khiam detention center. Several others were killed in assassinations against leftist activists in Beirut and southern Lebanon in the late 1980s.

The last recorded Jammoul operation in the south occurred in 1999.

== See also ==
- Lebanese Civil War
- Lebanese National Movement
- List of extrajudicial killings and political violence in Lebanon
- Union of Lebanese Democratic Youth
