= Communist Action Organization in Lebanon =

Communist Action Organization in Lebanon منظمة العمل الشيوعي في لبنان
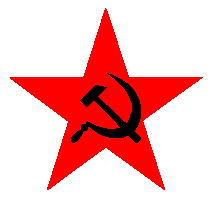
- Abbreviation: CAOL; OCAL
- Secretary-General: Zaki Taha
- Founder: Mohsen Ibrahim
- Founded: 1970
- Merger of: Organization of Lebanese Socialists; Socialist Lebanon
- Headquarters: Beirut
- Newspaper: Al-Hurriya
- Membership: 2,000 (1980s)
- Ideology: Socialism; Secularism; 1970–2022: Communism; Marxism–Leninism
- Political position: Left-wing to far-left
- Parliament of Lebanon: 0 / 128

Party flag
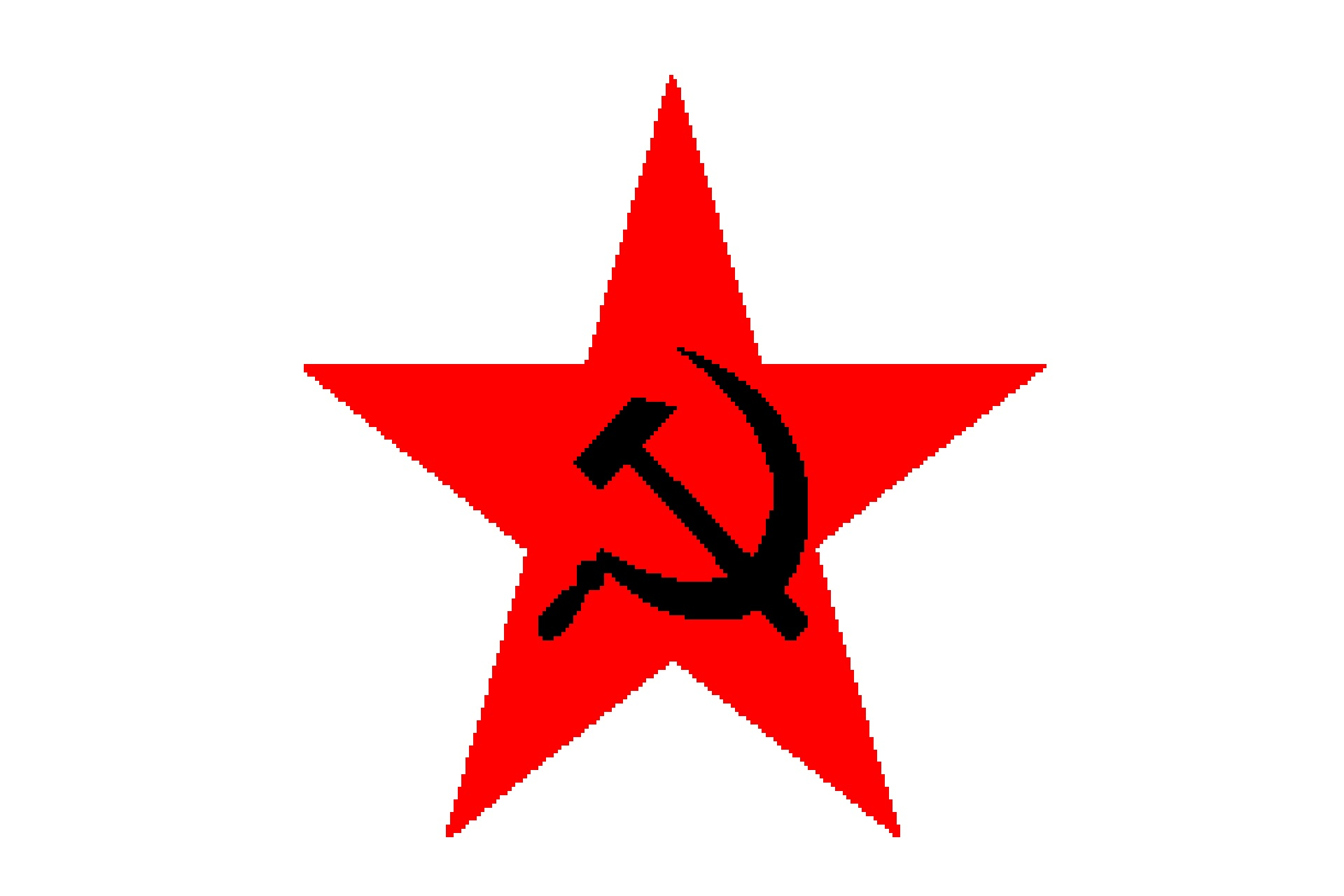

The Communist Action Organization in Lebanon – CAOL (Arabic: منظمة العمل الشيوعي في لبنان | munaẓẓamah al-‘amal al-shuyū‘ī fī lubnān), also known as Organization of Communist Action in Lebanon (OCAL) or the Secular Democratic Left Action Organization, is a socialist political party and former militia in Lebanon.

== Membership ==
The OACL was one of Lebanon's few multi-sectarian parties, with Christian, Muslim and Druze members, but its main support base lay on the Shi'a Muslim community. OACL played a major role in the political radicalization of the Shi'a community during the 1970s. In the 1980s, it had a membership of about 2,000.

== History of the OACL ==
=== Merger and foundation of OACL ===
The OACL was formed around 1970 through the merger of the Organization of Lebanese Socialists and Socialist Lebanon.

The Organization of Lebanese Socialists was led by Muhsin Ibrahim and Muhammed Kishli. It had its roots in the Lebanese branch of the Arab Nationalist Movement (ANM), a radical pan-Arab movement. During the 1960s Ibrahim was a leading figure in the leftist tendency with the ANM. This tendency, led by Nayef Hawatmeh, argued that the ANM ought to adopt a Marxist outlook. This was opposed by the top ANM leader George Habash who, although being open to introducing Marxist concepts like anti-imperialism into the discourse of the ANM, wanted to retain the anti-communist character of the organization.

As the central leadership of ANM had shifted to Damascus, the Lebanese branch began to function more autonomously. The official ANM organ al-Hurriya ('Freedom'), of which Ibrahim had become editor in 1960, became a de facto mouthpiece for the Marxist sector. In 1968 the Lebanese branch of ANM broke its links to the mother organization, and renamed itself as the Organization of Lebanese Socialists.

Socialist Lebanon was a small group of Marxist intellectuals, Arab nationalists and former Ba'athists which had been formed in 1965. Leading members included people like Ahmed Beydoun, Waddah Sharara, Fawwaz Trabulsi and Ismat Kawwas.

=== Early history of the Organization ===
Ibrahim became the General Secretary of OACL. OACL was closely allied with the Popular Democratic Front for the Liberation of Palestine led by Naif Hawatmeh, which had a similar background to the left-wing sector of the ANM. Hawatmeh had broken away from the ANM in 1969, setting up the PDFLP (later renamed as the Democratic Front for the Liberation of Palestine). Al-Hurriya was published from Beirut as the joint organ of PDFLP/DFLP and OACL until 1977, when it became the DFLP organ.

The OACL criticized the Lebanese Communist Party (LCP) led by George Hawi for 'reformist tendencies', but held unsuccessful talks on a party merger in the mid-1970s. OACL had a profound impact in the radical student movement that emerged in Lebanon in the early 1970s.

In the spring of 1972 a large number of OACL members, who felt that neither group had committed sufficiently to "people's war", defected to Fatah.

In 1973 the OACL took part in the formation of the Lebanese National Movement (LNM) together with the Progressive Socialist Party (PSP), the Lebanese Communist Party, Nasserists and others. Ibrahim became the General Secretary of the LNM.

In 1973-1974 the OACL was active in the Gandour food factory strike.

=== Military structure and organization ===
Communist Action Organization in Lebanon منظمة العمل الشيوعي في لبنان
- Leader: Mohsen Ibrahim
- Dates active: 1975–1991
- Headquarters: West Beirut
- Active regions: Lebanon
- Size: 2,500 fighters
- Part of: Lebanese National Movement; Lebanese National Resistance Front
- Wars: Lebanese Civil War

In virtue of Mohsen Ibrahim's position as the executive secretary of the Lebanese National Movement (LNM) since 1973, the OCAL played a major role in the 1975–76 Civil War thanks to his allegedly 2,000-strong militia, trained and armed by the Palestinian DFLP and Syria. Some sources however, estimate that the actual numbers of OCAL's military wing in the early 1980s were much lower, at about 150-200 fighters at most, being essentially a lightly armed infantry force devoid of any heavy weapons with the exception of a tiny number of Gun trucks and technicals armed with heavy machine guns and recoilless rifles.

=== The OACL in the Lebanese Civil War ===
When the Lebanese Civil War broke out in April 1975, the OACL fought on the side of the LNM, participating in the Battle of the Hotels. In the early 1980s the OACL had been allied with the Syrians; in 1981, in support of Syria, Ibrahim had called for the resignation of then Lebanese Prime-Minister Shafik Wazzan, who was felt to be too closely allied to then President Élias Sarkis.

=== 1982 and onwards ===
However, the LNM dissolved after the Israeli invasion of Lebanon of June 1982 and the expulsion of the PLO from Beirut. After the defeat of 1982, Muhsin Ibrahim elaborated a critical review of the politics of the LNM during its decade-long existence, which were disseminated through the party weekly organ Beirut al-Massa in the end of that year. Ibrahim's criticism was based on three points: that LNM forces had committed communal violence (although less than their opponents), that it had become dependent on other Arab states (a candid reference to the role of Syria) and that the LNM had failed in its mobilization of various sectors of Lebanese society due to the inclusion of traditional political elements in the Movement.

The OACL then played a leading role in the early phases of resistance to the Israeli occupation. According to Hawi, the Lebanese Communist Party, the OACL and the Arab Socialist Action Party led by Hussein Hamdan had agreed to establish a specifically Lebanese resistance formation before the expulsion of the PLO. Hawi claims that the joint communique calling for resistance to the Israeli occupation of Beirut was written by himself and Ibrahim on 15 September 1982, while the initial resistance activities against the Israelis were undertaken jointly by the Communist Party and the OACL along with some smaller organizations, with Hawi and Ibrahim meeting daily in secret to coordinate activities.

During the 1980s the Syrian occupation of Lebanon grew stronger, and the OACL's alliance with Syria weakened. When the War of the Camps broke out at Beirut in May 1985, the OACL allied itself with the pro-Arafat Palestinian refugee camp militias, the Al-Mourabitoun, the Sixth of February Movement and the Kurdish Democratic Party – Lebanon (KDP-L) against a powerful coalition of Druze Progressive Socialist Party (PSP), Lebanese Communist Party (LCP), and Shia Muslim Amal Movement militia forces backed by Syria, the Lebanese Army, and anti-Arafat dissident Palestinian guerrilla factions. The anti-Syrian coalition was defeated and by 1987 the OACL was forced underground, since Muhsen Ibrahim refused to go along with the Syrian policy of opposition to PLO chairman Yasser Arafat.

During 1982-2000, the OACL supported the Shi'a Islamist Hezbollah movement in its campaign of guerrilla warfare against the Israeli occupation of Southern Lebanon.

In 2022 the party relaunched its activities with a name change to the "Secular Democratic Left Action Organization", passing a resolution de-emphasizing Marxism and communism and focusing the party's ideology on secular socialist democracy.

== See also ==
- Battle of the Hotels
- Demographics of Lebanon
- Lebanese Civil War
- Lebanese Communist Party
- Lebanese National Movement
- Lebanese National Resistance Front
- List of weapons of the Lebanese Civil War
- People's Liberation Army (Lebanon)
- Progressive Socialist Party
- Popular Guard
- Politics of Lebanon
- War of the Camps

== Bibliography ==
- Antoine J. Abraham, The Lebanon war, Greenwood Publishing Group, Westport, Connecticut 1996. ISBN 9780275953898, 0275953890
- CIA Lebanon report, Directory of Libanese Militias – A Reference Aid, NESA 84-10171C, June 1984, pp. 6–7. Declassified in Part – Sanitized Copy Approved for Release 2009/06/16: CIA-RDP85T00314R000100070001-4. –
- Edgar O'Ballance, Civil War in Lebanon, 1975-92, Palgrave Macmillan, London 1998. ISBN 0-333-72975-7
- Fawwaz Traboulsi, A History of Modern Lebanon: Second Edition, Pluto Press, London 2012. ISBN 978-0745332741
- Jennifer Philippa Eggert, Female Fighters and Militants During the Lebanese Civil War: Individual Profiles, Pathways, and Motivations, Studies in Conflict & Terrorism, Taylor & Francis Group, LLC, 2018. –
- Jennifer Philippa Eggert, Women and the Lebanese Civil War: Female Fighters in Lebanese and Palestinian Militias, Palgrave Macmillan, London 2022 (1st edition). ISBN 978-3030837877, 3030837874
- Marius Deeb, The Lebanese Civil War, Praeger Publishers Inc., New York 1980. ISBN 978-0030397011
- Rex Brynen, Sanctuary and Survival: the PLO in Lebanon, Boulder: Westview Press, Oxford 1990. ISBN 0 86187 123 5 –
- Robert Fisk, Pity the Nation: Lebanon at War, London: Oxford University Press, (3rd ed. 2001). ISBN 0-19-280130-9 –
- Samir Makdisi and Richard Sadaka, The Lebanese Civil War, 1975-1990, American University of Beirut, Institute of Financial Economics, Lecture and Working Paper Series (2003 No.3), pp. 1–53. –
- Tom Najem and Roy C. Amore, Historical Dictionary of Lebanon, Second Edition, Historical Dictionaries of Asia, Oceania, and the Middle East, Rowman & Littlefield Publishers, Lanham, Boulder, New York & London 2021. ISBN 9781538120439, 1538120437
- William W. Harris, Faces of Lebanon: Sects, Wars, and Global Extensions, Princeton Series on the Middle East, Markus Wiener Publishers, Princeton, New Jersey, 1997. ISBN 978-1558761155, 1-55876-115-2
