= Farajallah el-Helou =

Lebanese communist politician and militant (1906–1959)

Farajallah el-Helou فرج الله الحلو
- Statue of el-Helou in Hosrayel, Lebanon
- Born: Farajallah Estephan el-Helou; 6 June 1906; Hosrayel, Byblos, Lebanon
- Died: June 25, 1959 (aged 53); Damascus, Syria
- Occupation: Politician
- Title: General Secretary
- Predecessor: Fuad Shemali
- Successor: Nicolas Shawi
- Political party: Lebanese Communist Party
- Spouse: Virginie el-Helou
- Children: Boshra, Najwa and Nada

Farajallah Estephan el-Helou (6 June 1906 – 25 June 1959) or Farjallah Helou (Arabic: فرج الله الحلو, romanized: Farajallah al-Ḥelū) was a Lebanese communist militant, a popular Lebanese political figure and head of the Lebanese Communist Party.

== Early life ==
Farajallah el-Helou was born to Estephane el-Helou in Hosrayel, Mount Lebanon in a conservative Maronite family. He studied at a public school in Byblos, then in Amsheet and Notre Dame de Mayfouq. His mother and some of his siblings left Lebanon, but Farajallah stayed with his father Estephane, his older sister Mariana, and his brother Ghaleb. He later traveled to Syria where he was a teacher in Arabic language and literature the National Evangelical College in Homs and also continued his studies in literature in Syria where he got exposed to Marxist ideology. At the end of the 1920s, he returned to Lebanon and alongside Fu'ad al-Shimali, Yusuf Yazbek and Artin Madoyan, a founding member of the Syrian–Lebanese Communist Party and the party's first secretary. He married Virginie el-Helou, a communist party sympathizer and had three daughters, Bushra, Najwa and Nada.

== Politics ==
In 1934, el-Helou travelled to the USSR including a tour of the Asian Soviet Socialist Republics and wrote the book A New Humanity Building a New World (In Arabic انسانية جديدة تبني عالما جديدا). In 1935, he became part of the Syrian–Lebanese Communist Party later renamed Lebanese Communist Party (LCP) and Syrian Communist Party. El-Helou became a member of its Central Committee and actively took part in demonstrations against the French Mandate of Lebanon and Syria and for independence of Lebanon. He was arrested briefly in Syria and deported to Lebanon. In 1937 he was named secretary of the Central Committee of the party headed by Khaled Bakdash. He unsuccessfully led an electoral campaign to be elected as a member of the Lebanese Parliament from Mount Lebanon. He also supervised the publication of the Lebanese Communist organ Voice of the People (in Arabic صوت الشعب). In 1939, he was arrested again, this time by the French Mandate and put to trial and convicted for 5 year imprisonment. He spent 22 months in prison alongside party leader Nicolas al-Shawi before release in 1941.

He headed the party in 1946 as Secretary General, a post that was hastily transferred to Nicolas el-Shawi as he traveled to Paris and London to study Marxism. He was further alienated from the party after his criticism of the USSR for approving the 1947 resolutions in United Nations Partition Plan for Palestine that led to the establishment of Israel in 1948. But he remained a staunch communist and member of the party although he was chastised for his views on USSR. During the Soviet Stalinist hegemony on the Lebanese Communist Party, he was blamed for criticizing the Soviet Union and after a big rift with the pro-Stalinist wing represented by Khalid Bakdash, was forced to write his own "confessions" and "admitting of mistakes" in a document known as "Risalat Salem" (رسالة سالم) in a bid to remain in the party. In the 1950s, his party actively opposed the rule of President Camille Chamoun in what was known as the 1958 uprising.

== Death ==
After the Khalid Bakdash communist leadership in Syria was decimated with the Syrian wing of the Communist Party opposing the establishment of United Arab Republic and the union of Egypt and Syria under a Nasserite regime, Bakdash lived in exile in Prague, as many other Syrian Communists found refuge in Lebanon. The Syrian communists drafted a plan of action and Farajallah El-Helou was, upon the insistence of Bakdash, sent to Syria to take care of situation of the Syrian communists. After visiting Syria, el-Helou returned to Lebanon in May 1959 presenting a long report to the party Central Committee about the situation. But with the insistence of the exiled and autocratic communist leader Bakdash, on 18 June 1959, Farajallah el-Helou went on his second secret mission to Syria in a year.

He was duly arrested after five days of his clandestine mission by the secret services of the United Arab Republic led by Abdel Hamid al-Sarraj and its Lebanese Affairs bureau led by Burhan Adham on 25 June after a defecting Syrian communist operative now working with the new pro-Nasser regime led the secret agents to his hideout in Damascus. He was repeatedly investigated by the Deuxième Bureau for naming other Syrian communists and sympathizers opposed to the union which he vehemently refused. He was reportedly killed under torture the same day or the following one or two days. The actual date of death is still a mystery. His body was first buried in a secret location, and fearing exposure of the crime, later his body was reportedly burned in a pool of sulfuric acid and his remains disposed of in the Barada river. Details of his torture, murder and disposal were made public by Al Akhbar, the official organ of the Syrian communists after the dissolution of the Egyptian Syrian union.

== Legacy ==
Farajallah el-Helou is widely considered as one of the martyrs of Arab communism. Many poems and songs are dedicated to him including one by the Egyptian poet and stage writer Naguib Srour.

In 1971 Soviet artist Lev Alexandrovich Russov sculpted a statue of martyr Farajallah el-Helou. The commemorative statue was bombed a few years later reportedly by the invading Syrian Army in retaliation after the leftist Lebanese National Movement made up of Arab nationalists, socialists and communists led by Kamal Jumblatt opposed the invasion.

During the visit of Hanna Gharib to Hosrayel and the commemoration of the communist leader Farjallah el-Helou

Also in 1971, the critically acclaimed comedy/tragedy theatre piece written by Issam Mahfouz was presented on stage titled Why Did Sirhan Sirhan Refuse What the Zaim Said About Farajallah el-Helou in Stereo 71 (in Arabic لماذا رفض سرحان سرحان ما قاله الزعيم عن فرج الله الحلو في ستيريو 71) Sirhan Sirhan being the Arab Palestinian Jordanian who killed Robert F. Kennedy and Zaim being the honorific title of Antoun Saadeh, the founder of the Syrian Social Nationalist Party. The piece was adapted and staged a second time in 2015 in the Gulbenkian Theatre in Lebanese American University directed this time by Lena Khoury.

In 1974, Dar al Farabi publishing house launched the book كتابات مختارة لفرج الله الحلو being excerpts from el-Helou's various writings.

After a decision of the Lebanese Communist Party, following the 2005 Cedar Revolution and withdrawal of Syria from Lebanon, Lev Alexandrovich Russov's blown commemorative statue was restored back and its official reopening was made on 19 September 2005, with thousands of sympathizers attending the event in Hosrayel, Farjallah el-Helou's birthplace.

In 2009, author Karim Mroueh published through Dar al Saqi the biographical book The Four Great Communists in the Modern History of Lebanon: Fu'ad al-Shimali, Farajallah el-Helou, Nicolas el-Shawi, George Hawi.

In 2013, the Lebanese communist radio station Voice of the People (صوت الشعب) broadcast a series of programmes about Farajallah el-Helou under the title Farajallah el-Helou: Combatant and Martyr (فرج الله الحلو: مناضلا وشهيدا).

Hanna Gharib, the newly elected general secretary of the Lebanese Communist Party visited the house and the statue of Farajallah el-Helou in Hosrayel in June 2016, few months after his election and delivered a speech honoring the historical leader and martyr of the party.

== See also ==
- Lebanese Communist Party
- George Hawi
- Hanna Gharib
- Hosrayel
