= Kurdish Democratic Party (Lebanon) =

Kurdish Democratic Party in Lebanon
- Founded: 1960; 66 years ago
- Dissolved: 1991; 35 years ago
- Ideology: Kurdish nationalism National conservatism Economic liberalism Right-wing populism Barzanism
- International affiliation: Kurdistan Democratic Party
- Parliament of Lebanon: 0 / 128

Website
- www.kdp-lebanon.org

Armed Wing
- Leader: Jamil Mihhu
- Dates active: 1975–1991
- Headquarters: Beqaa Valley
- Active regions: Lebanon; Iraqi Kurdistan
- Size: 3,000

The Kurdish Democratic Party in Lebanon (Kurmanji Kurdish: Parti a Demoqrat a Kurdî e Lubnan, lit. 'Kurdish Democratic Party in Lebanon'; Arabic: الحزب الديمقراطي الكردي في لبنان, romanized: Ḥizb al-Dīmuqrāṭī al-Kurdī fī Lubnān, lit. 'Kurdish Democratic Party in Lebanon' French: Parti Democratique Kurde – Liban, lit. 'Kurdish Democratic Party – Lebanon'), is the Lebanese branch of a namesake Iraqi-based Kurdish nationalist party, established by Jamil Mihhu in 1960, and based in Lebanon. However, it was not licensed until 24 September 1970.

After the intra conflict within KDP which led to schism and the party split up. Mihhu challenged Masoud Barzani and supported the Iraqi government against Kurdish rebels fighting for an independent Iraqi Kurdistan. Mihhu was captured, tortured and later executed by the peshmerga in Iraq on the orders of Masoud Barzani.

Consequently, the leadership of the party passed to Jamil's son, Riyad. Another son, Muhammad, disagreed with his family's position on several issues and therefore in 1977 started his own movement, the Kurdish Democratic Party-Temporary Leadership.

The party ceased activities in 1991 after the death of Jamil Mihhu, and lost its legal status in 1991.

== The KDP-L in the Lebanese Civil War 1975–1990 ==
When the War of the Camps broke out at Beirut in May 1985, the KDP-L joined an alliance of pro-Arafat Palestinian refugee camp militias, the Al-Mourabitoun, the Communist Action Organization in Lebanon (OCAL), and the Sixth of February Movement ('6th FM') militias against a powerful coalition that gathered their Druze allies of the Progressive Socialist Party (PSP), and the Shia Muslim Amal movement militia forces backed by Syria, the Lebanese Army, and anti-Arafat dissident Palestinian guerrilla factions.

== See also ==
- Kurdish Democratic Party (Turkey)
- Al-Mourabitoun
- Lebanese Civil War
- Lebanese National Movement
- Organization of Communist Action in Lebanon (OCAL)
- People's Liberation Army (Lebanon)
- Popular Guard
- Progressive Socialist Party
- Razkari Party
- Sixth of February Movement
- War of the Camps

== Bibliography ==
- Edgar O'Ballance, Civil War in Lebanon, 1975-92, Palgrave Macmillan, London 1998. ISBN 0-333-72975-7
- Marius Deeb, The Lebanese Civil War, Praeger Publishers Inc., New York 1980. ISBN 978-0030397011
- William W. Harris, Faces of Lebanon: Sects, Wars, and Global Extensions, Princeton Series on the Middle East, Markus Wiener Publishers, 1997. ISBN 978-1558761155, 1-55876-115-2
