= Anwar Yassin =

Lebanese prisoner

Anwar Yassin ((Arabic: أنور ياسين, romanized: ʾAnwar Yāssīn) is a former Lebanese prisoner in Israeli prisons. He was both a member of the Popular Guard, the armed wing of the Lebanese Communist Party (LCP), and the broader Lebanese National Resistance Front (LNRF; aka Jammoul) guerrilla alliance, since his early youth in the mid-1980s. He was arrested by the Israel Defense Forces (IDF) during an operation in southern Lebanon, near the Shebaa Farms, in September 1987, when he was only 17 years old.

He was released in an exchange operation between the Lebanese resistance led by Hizbollah and the IDF in January 2005 after spending 18 years in detention. Anwar Yassin ran for parliamentary elections representing the LCP in May 2005 and got 18,244 votes in Bint Jbeil in southern Lebanon, but lost to his opponents from the Hizbollah and Amal parties.

Since his release from prison, Yassin has been active in both the Union of Lebanese Democratic Youth and the LCP. He was elected as member of the central committee of the party in its 10th congress in March 2009. He also works as a reporter for the Lebanese television station New TV.

== See also ==
- George Hawi
- Lebanese Civil War
- Souha Bechara
- Popular Guard
