= Mohsen Ibrahim =

Lebanese politician (1935–2020)

Mohsin Ibrahim
- Born: 1935; Ansar, Lebanon
- Died: June 3, 2020 (aged 85)
- Resting place: Ansar, Lebanon
- Occupations: school teacher, politician
- Political party: Communist Action Organization in Lebanon; Lebanese National Resistance Front; Lebanese National Movement; Organization of Lebanese Socialists; Arab Nationalist Movement

Mohsin Ibrahim (Arabic: محسن إبراهيم Muḥsin ‘Ibrāhīm), kunya Abu Khaled (Arabic: أبو خالد; 1935 – June 3, 2020), was a Lebanese politician. He was a prominent personality of the Lebanese and Arab left. Initially a Nasserist nationalist, he later turned to Marxism and became the leader of the Communist Action Organization in Lebanon (OACL). As the head of OACL, he played key roles in the building of alliances during the Lebanese Civil War.

== Youth ==
Muhsin Ibrahim was born to a Shia Muslim family in Ansar in southern Lebanon in 1935. Ibrahim worked as a school teacher in southern Lebanon. He joined the Arab Nationalist Movement in the 1950s, being a fierce supporter of the Egyptian president Gamal Abdel Nasser. He took part in the first conference of the Arab Nationalist Movement in Amman on December 25, 1956, and was elected to the leadership of the organization. In 1964, Ibrahim took part in meeting with Nasser, as the Arab Nationalist Movement tried to convince him to support the Dhofar Rebellion. In early 1966, Ibrahim travelled to Taiz along with George Habbash and Hani al-Hindi, as a delegation of the Arab Nationalist Movement seeking to convince the Yemeni National Liberation Front to merge with the Front for the Liberation of Occupied South Yemen.

== Split in the Arab Nationalist Movement ==
During 1962–1965 a factional conflict surged within the Arab Nationalist Movement. Ibrahim was part of a tendency a within the Arab Nationalist Movement, including Nayef Hawatmeh, Mohammed Kishli, Bilal al-Hasan and Abdel Fattah Ismail, that became increasing inspired by the Cuban, Chinese and Vietnamese revolutions and began to gear towards Marxism. The radical group, to which Ibrahim belonged, stressed that national and social struggles should not be separated from each other. In 1966 the group around Ibrahim began publishing articles in Al-Hurriya, the organ of the Arab Nationalist Movement, that were critical of the government of the United Arab Republic. Ibrahim was the editor of Al-Hurriya. However, until 1967 the tendency of Ibrahim remained committed to Nasserism. The defeat of Egypt in the 1967 Six-Day War aggravated the divisions within the Arab Nationalist Movement, with the tendency of Ibrahim, Hawatmeh and Ismail moving from nationalism to Marxism-Leninism. In 1968 Ibrahim founded the Organization of Lebanese Socialists, which in 1970 merged with the group Socialist Lebanon to form the Communist Action Organization in Lebanon (OACL). In 1975 Ibrahim was named general secretary of OACL (hitherto the organization had a collective leadership), a post he was to occupy until his death.

== Civil War and Resistance ==
With the outbreak of the Lebanese Civil War in 1975, Ibrahim emerged as a key leader of the Lebanese National Movement (a coalition of leftist and nationalist movements, aligned with the Palestinian forces) along with Kamal Jumblatt and George Hawi. In 1977 Ibrahim was named Executive Secretary of the Lebanese National Movement, after the killing of the incumbent secretary Kamal Jumblatt. Ibrahim had been a close associate of Jumblatt.

In September 1982 Ibrahim and the Lebanese Communist Party leader George Hawi founded the Lebanese National Resistance Front, to confront the Israeli invasion of Lebanon.

== Later years ==
After the 1989 Taif Agreement, Ibrahim largely withdrew from Lebanese political life, largely due to his opposition to the role of the Syrian government (then in conflict with Yasser Arafat, to whom Ibrahim remained closely aligned) in Lebanon. Ibrahim was part of the Tunis-based negotiation team of the Palestine Liberation Organization in the process leading up to the Oslo Accords. He maintained close relations with the Palestinian leadership, especially with Yasser Arafat. Following the killing of George Hawi, at the fortieth-day observation of Hawi's death, Ibrahim broke his silence in Lebanese politics and issued a strong self-criticism on the role of the Lebanese left during the civil war (having allowed the Palestinian movement to set its agenda and for having attempted to confront the sectarian system in Lebanon without understanding its underlying causes).

== Recognitions ==
Ibrahim was awarded the Medal of the October 14 Revolution of the People's Democratic Republic of Yemen. On February 23, 2017, Ibrahim was awarded the Gold Order of Merit and Distinction by Palestinian president Mahmoud Abbas 'for his defense of the rights of the Palestinian people'.

== Death ==
Ibrahim died on June 3, 2020, at the age of 85. His funeral took place in Ansar on June 5, 2020. Attendees at the funeral included Progressive Socialist Party leader Walid Jumblatt, former parliamentarian and PSP leader Ghazi Aridi, Lebanese Communist Party general secretary Hanna Gharib and the parliamentarians Osama Saad, Yassine Jaber and Ali Osseiran, the representative of PLO and Fatah in Lebanon Fathi Abu Al-Ardat and the Palestinian ambassador to Lebanon Ashraf Dabour.

After Ibrahim's death, Palestinian president Mahmoud Abbas ordered flags across Palestine to be lowered in tribute to Ibrahim and announced one day of mourning. In his obituary over Ibrahim, the Progressive Socialist Party leader Walid Jumblatt described him as 'the best friend and ally of Kamal Jumblatt'. Former Prime Minister Fouad Siniora described Ibrahim as one of the foremost leaders of the armed resistance against the Israeli occupation. Former Prime Minister Saad Hariri described Ibrahim as 'a personality of the Arab and national struggle' who had 'dedicated his life to the Palestinian cause'. The Speaker of the Lebanese National Assembly, Nabih Berri, presented his condolences to Ibrahim's son.
