= Al-Sahafi =

Al-Sahafi is a surname. Notable people with the surname include:

- Marwan Al-Sahafi (born 2004), Saudi footballer
- Ziyad Al-Sahafi (born 1994), Saudi footballer

== See also ==
- Al-Ṣaḥafi al-Taʼih, defunct Lebanese newspaper
