= Organization of Lebanese Socialists =

- Arabic name: منظمة الاشتراكيين اللبنانيين
- Abbreviation: MIL
- Leader: Muhsin Ibrahim; Muhammed Kishli
- Founded: 1968
- Split from: Harakiyyin
- Succeeded by: CAOL
- Newspaper: Al-Hurriya
- Ideology: Socialism; Marxism

The Organization of Lebanese Socialists (Arabic: منظمة الاشتراكيين اللبنانيين, Munaẓẓamah al-ištirākiyyin al-lubnāniyyin) was a political organization in Lebanon. The organization was led by Muhsin Ibrahim and Muhammed Kishli. It had its roots in the Lebanese branch of the Arab Nationalist Movement (ANM), a radical pan-Arab movement. During the 1960s Ibrahim was a leading figure in the leftist tendency with the ANM. This tendency, led by Naif Hawatmeh, argued that the ANM ought to adopt a Marxist outlook. This was opposed by the top ANM leader George Habash who, although being open to introducing Marxism into the discourse of the ANM, wanted to retain the anti-Communist character of the organization.

As the central leadership of ANM had shifted to Damascus, the Lebanese branch began to function more autonomously. The official ANM organ al-Hurriya ('Freedom'), of which Ibrahim had become editor in 1960, became a de facto mouthpiece for the Marxist sector. In 1968 the Lebanese branch of ANM broke its links to the mother organization, and renamed itself as the Organization of Lebanese Socialists. The viewpoint of the Organization of Lebanese Socialists on the split were formulated in the pamphlet Limadha Munaẓẓamah al-ištirākiyyin al-lubnāniyyin (literally, "Why the Organization of Lebanese Socialists?").

Around 1970 the Organization of Lebanese Socialists and Socialist Lebanon merged to form the Communist Action Organization in Lebanon.
