= Al-Insaniyyah =

Weekly Arabic-language newspaper in Lebanon and Syria

Al-Insaniyyah masthead

Al-Insaniyyah (Arabic: الإنسانية, 'Humanity') was a weekly Arabic-language newspaper circulated in Lebanon and Syria. It was issued as the organ of the Lebanese People's Party (the public front organization of the Syrian-Lebanese Communist Party). The newspaper was launched by the general secretary of the People's Party Yusuf Yazbek on May 15, 1925. Al-Insaniyyah was named after the French communist newspaper l'Humanité. Al-Insaniyyah was the first official Arabic-language communist newspaper. However, it was not a publicly communist newspaper. The first issue of the newspaper declared that it would speak on behalf of the interests of the poor and victims of injustice. The second issue presented the political line of the People's Party, advocating industrial and agricultural development, formation of labour unions, compulsory education and secularism.

The third, fourth and fifth issues of al-Insaniyyah expressed more strident positions, attacking the French Mandate and calling for protection of workers rights. The Syrian-Lebanese People's Party published its manifesto in the fourth issue of al-Insaniyyah issued on June 7, 1925, calling on workers to participate in the upcoming elections to defend their class interests and struggle for independence against French colonial rule (a political position later reversed by the Communist Party, as the French authorities organized elections on sectarian basis).

The newspaper was shut down by the French authorities on 16 June, after only five issues were published. Orders were issued to arrest the editors of the newspapers and the Communist Party leadership. Yazbak fled to France.
