= Joseph Berger-Barzilai =

Russian-Israeli communist politician (1904–1978)

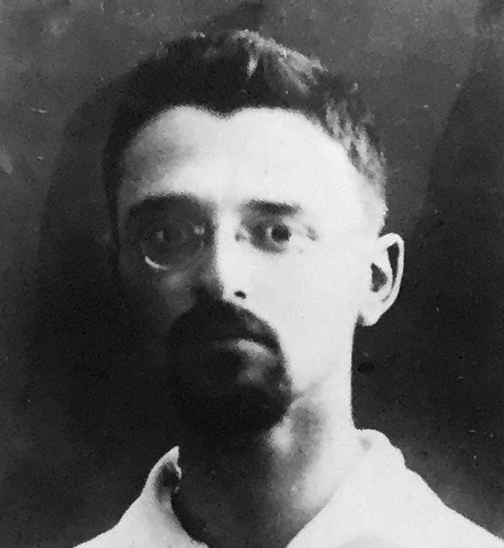
- Berger-Barzilai's Palestine Police mugshot, 1925
- Born: 29 November 1904; Kraków, Kingdom of Galicia and Lodomeria, Austria-Hungary
- Died: 31 March 1978 (aged 73); Israel
- Political party: Communist Party of Palestine; Palestine Communist Party
- Spouse: Esther Feldman

Joseph Berger-Barzilai (Russian: Иосиф Михайлович Бергер-Барзилай, romanized: Iosif Mikhaylovich Berger-Barzilay; 29 November 1904 – 31 March 1978), born Itskhak Mordukhovich Zheliaznik (Russian: Ицхак Мордухович Желязник), was a founding member and the secretary of the Communist Party of Palestine and an official of the Communist International. A victim of the Great Purge, Berger-Barzilai was imprisoned in various Gulag prisons for a total of 16 years.

== Early life ==
Itskhak Mordukhovich Zheliaznik (also spelled Zilsnik or Zeliaznik) was born on 29 November 1904 in Kraków, Kingdom of Galicia and Lodomeria (present-day Poland). In 1914, his family fled the Russian army, which threatened to invade their city, for Vienna, and in 1916 they moved to Bielitz, Austrian Silesia.

Brought up as an Orthodox Jew and a Zionist, the young Berger was active in the Zionist youth group Wanderbund Blau-Weiß [de], and later moved toward the left by joining Hashomer Hatzair. In 1919, at age 15, he emigrated to Palestine. He initially worked in road construction and subsequently as a translator for an engineering firm. Throughout his life, he mastered numerous languages, becoming fluent in Yiddish, German, Polish, English, Hebrew, and Russian, while also picking up Arabic and French.

He soon became one of the region's first communists, driven primarily by his disillusionment with left-wing Zionists who he felt overwhelmingly ignored the expulsion of Arabs from their land. Seeking an alternative to what he considered settler-colonialism, he assumed the name Berger and committed to the communist movement.

== Career ==
Berger-Barzilai took part in the founding of the Palestinian Communist Party (PCP) in 1922 and became its secretary. In September 1922, at the 2nd Congress of the PCP, a radical minority led by Berger demanded immediate and unconditional adhesion to the Communist International and split from the PCP to form a separate Communist Party of Palestine (KPP), aggressively criticizing the majority's reconciliatory position toward Socialist Zionism. Following the expulsion of both factions from the Histadrut in February 1923, the groups were forced to cooperate and eventually reunited in June 1923 under Berger's radical platform, adopting the Yiddish name Palestinishe Komunistishe Partei (PKP).

The reunited party adopted a program written by Berger that broke with all forms of Zionism. Its first Central Committee consisted of Wolf Averbach as secretary, Berger as his deputy, Moishe Kuperman, and Nahum Lestshinsky. The party operated under strictly illegal conditions, as the British Mandate Authority had outlawed all communist activities.

In 1924, acting as Deputy Secretary, he was sent to Moscow to negotiate the party's entry into the Comintern. He was sent to the USSR at the end of 1924 to assist the Plenum of the Communist International, and returned to Moscow as a party delegate in August 1926 and again in July–September 1928 for the 6th Congress of the Communist International. During trips to Moscow in 1924 and 1925, he met his wife, Russian-Jewish Esther Feldman, and encountered prominent Soviet figures like Nikolai Bukharin (whose New Economic Policy he admired) and Karl Radek.

In late 1924, he was dispatched to Beirut to establish a branch of the party, meeting with figures like Yusuf Ibrahim Yazbak and Fuad al-Shamali as part of the PCP's attempts to extend its base beyond the Jewish minority. The result was the Lebanese People's Party, a front organization founded around a communist party of Lebanon and Syria. Berger considered this new Lebanese party to be a branch of the PCP, as the Palestinian party constituted the most developed organizational kernel of the communist movement in the Middle East and aspired to coordinate activities across the surrounding countries. However, this ambition to direct the region's activities was heavily criticized by the Comintern. He also served as an emissary to Egypt and Transjordan.

Upon his return to Palestine, he faced continuous persecution. After a trip to Moscow, police authorities refused him entry back into Palestine on 16 August 1926. As a stateless citizen, he was forced to remain aboard an Italian ship that sailed back and forth for six weeks before the International Aid Organization for Arrested Revolutionaries and Labor Zionists managed to obtain his release. He subsequently lived in an Arab village, Beit Safafa, under a false identity with his wife and son, directing party activities and frequently contributing to Comintern journals under the initials "J.B." or the pseudonym "Bob".

Within the PCP, Berger-Barzilai grappled with a order from the Comintern to "Arabize" the party's upper ranks. This transition was marked by internal tension, as the party's demographics were heavily skewed: Jewish members and supporters comprised about 10,000 people, while Arab affiliates numbered fewer than 1,000. As the PCP's first party secretary, Berger-Barzilai argued that the party could no longer exhaust its political activity in the "Zionist Ghetto." To engage in active anti-imperialist struggle, he stated it must enter into a living connection with the decisive mass of the working population, the Arab workers and peasants, transforming into a party of Arab workers and "territorialized Jewish comrades" who were acquainted with Arab customs and language. Despite this, Berger-Barzilai and the Jewish leadership initially stalled the implementation of the policy out of caution before eventually conceding central leadership roles to Arab comrades.

In the spring of 1929, he was called to Moscow, where he had a five-hour meeting with Joseph Stalin on 5 March. He was told to strengthen ties with the Arab Executive Committee and other Arab nationalist organizationst. He returned to Palestine in August 1929 to take command of the party just as the 1929 riots broke out. The civil war was sparked by tensions over the Western Wall, and after a week of violence, 133 Jews and 116 Arabs had been murdered. During the violence, Berger and Czech Comintern official Bohumír Šmeral were kept safe from Arab attacks by the party's self-defense force, the Boyivka, led by Moishe Kuperman.

During the uprising, Berger-Barzilai utilized his cover as a journalist to rent a safe house in Beit Safafa; as sectarian violence escalated, his Arab landlord evacuated him at gunpoint to the safety of the Jewish neighborhood of Talpiot. Initially, Berger characterized the clashes as a "civil war" resulting from colonialism, arguing that the British, Arab Effendis, and Zionist leaders had fomented religious hatred to divide the workers. However, the Comintern intervened and advised Berger to revise his assessment, asking the party to support the Arab uprising as an anti-imperialist rebellion, prompting Berger to reorganize the party to include an Arab leadership. In 1930, he was officially expelled from the country by British mandate authorities.

=== Berlin and Moscow ===
Berger was sent to Berlin in 1931 to work for Willi Münzenberg's League Against Imperialism. Arriving in October 1931, he co-edited publications with Clemens Dutt and met figures like Jawaharlal Nehru. Writing under the pen name "L. Haddad," he published the pamphlet Tag des Fellachen (The Day of the Fellah), which interpreted the 1929 clashes as a purely anti-imperialist Arab revolt. His time in Germany was cut short when he was arrested in December 1931 and spent several months in Moabit Prison.

In January 1933, Berger and his family were summoned to Moscow. He was granted Soviet citizenship, lectured briefly at the University of Moscow, and was appointed as a Comintern official heading the Near Eastern Department, a post he held for two years.

== Arrest and exile ==
Though he remained a staunch communist, Berger began harboring doubts about the government. In 1934, he was abruptly dismissed from his post and expelled from the party without explanation, finding temporary work in a printing house. On 27 January 1935, he was arrested under the allegation of being a Trotskyite agitator. After refusing to confess during two months of interrogation, the Special Council of the NKVD sentenced him to five years in a labor prison. He was initially sent to Mariinsk and then Gornaya Shoriya.

In 1936, he was brought back to Moscow's Lubyanka prison to serve as a potential witness in the trial of Kamenev and Zinoviev. When authorities determined they could not use him, he was sentenced to death; however, the verdict was unexpectedly changed to eight years in prison. Before being returned to Siberia, Berger launched a 44-day hunger strike, successfully demanding to see his wife. While in Lubyanka, he also met Leon Trotsky's son, Sergei Sedov.

Berger-Barzilai was held in horrific conditions across various prisons, including Vladimir Central Prison, Solovki special prison, Dudinka, and Norilsk. On 17 July 1941, he was charged with organizing a prisoner overthrow and was once again sentenced to death. He initiated a 56-day hunger strike and adamantly refused to sign his own death warrant. The omission of this signature prevented the prison from ratifying his execution; instead, his sentence was commuted to an additional ten years. He was subsequently confined in Alexandrovsk and Tayshet.

Of the entire first Central Committee of the PKP, only Berger would survive the terror; his former comrades Averbach, Lestshinsky, and Kuperman were all murdered or died in the prisons. Over his many years of imprisonment, Berger slowly found comfort in a return to the Jewish faith. In 1951, he was released from the prisons but sentenced to permanent, lifelong exile in Siberia, working as a night watchman at a school in Pyatkovo. His wife and son, who had also been persecuted, were allowed to visit him in Siberia after 15 years of separation.

== Later life ==
Berger-Barzilai was officially rehabilitated in March 1956 and was allowed to leave the Soviet Union for Poland. In Warsaw, he worked at the Polish Institute for International Affairs before the family chose to immigrate to Israel.

Settling in Tel Aviv under the name Barzilai, he abandoned his communist practices for religious observance, though he continued to consider himself part of the independent, peace-leaning political left. He became a correspondent for a Polish newspaper and was appointed as an associate professor of political science at Bar-Ilan University.

He published several vital historical texts about his experiences and the fate of Soviet Jews, including The Jews in the Soviet Union and their Fate (1959, under the pseudonym Penimí), Midnight Shine: Jewish Prisoners in the Soviet Union (1962), and The Tragedy of the Soviet Revolution (1968). In the late 1960s, he dictated his sweeping memoirs to friends; they were published to critical acclaim in 1971 as Shipwreck of a Generation in the UK and Nothing But the Truth in the US.

Reflecting on the ideological migrations of his era, Berger-Barzilai also wrote about the ill-fated pioneers of the Labor Battalion, led by Menachem Elkind, who had departed Mandatory Palestine in 1928 to establish a Jewish communist collective (Via Nova) in Crimea. In 1962, he noted the grim irony of their endeavor, observing that while Zionist survivors were actively persecuted in the USSR, this group of pioneers voluntarily returned before their collective was ultimately dismantled by Soviet authorities.

Berger-Barzilai died on 31 March 1978 and was buried in the Kiryat Shaul Cemetery in Tel Aviv. He was preceded in death by his wife, Esther, who died six years earlier. He left behind his son, Dr. Yaakov Berger.

== Works ==
- Joseph Berger: Shipwreck of a generation: Memoirs (British title), Nothing But the Truth: Joseph Stalin's Prison Camps-A Survivor's Account of the Victim's he Knew (American title), (1971).
