= Kurdish Democratic Party (Turkey) =

Kurdish political party in Turkey

- Leader: Reşit Akıncı
- Founder: Reşit Akıncı
- Founded: May 12, 2020
- Ideology: Kurdish nationalism National conservatism Right-wing populism Barzanism
- Political position: Right-wing

The Kurdish Democratic Party (Kurdish: Partiya Demokrata Kurd; Turkish: Kürt Demokrat Partisi) is a Kurdish political party in Turkey.

== History ==
On May 12, 2020, Reşit Akıncı announced the official establishment of the Kurdish Democratic Party. The party was originally supposed to be named "Kurdistan Democratic Party", and branded as a Turkish version of the Iraqi Kurdistan Democratic Party, although its leadership replaced "Kurdistan" with "Kurdish" to avoid being banned. Akıncı stated that the party walks "on the path of Mullah Mustafa Barzani, and is on his national line". Akıncı claimed that the party was formed as a conservative Kurdish party, and as a "third line for Kurds" who were too Kurdish for the AKP, and too conservative for the HDP.

Akıncı was a member of the Turkey Kurdistan Democratic Party (T-KDP) before leaving it. Despite its name, T-KDP had no ideological relation with Barzani or KDP, and was actually left-wing and liberal. Akıncı left T-KDP after its leader Mehmet Emin Kardaş joined an alliance with HDP, with Akıncı stating that it was not because of the alliance itself, but because Kardaş had joined the alliance without consulting the rest of T-KDP.

CHP leader Kemal Kılıçdaroğlu claimed that "when the government could not take the HDP to its side, they are looking to establish a second party and break up the HDP", after which Akıncı replied "a party established by conservative politicians has come out to support the People's Alliance. This does not apply to us. We did not have such a request, nor did we receive such a request from the People's Alliance. Savcı Sayan, the AKP mayor of Ağrı, claimed that the party was planning on supporting the People’s Alliance, although it was denied by Akıncı.

The party did not participate in the 2023 Turkish general election, although it supported HAK-PAR and HÜDA-PAR during the election, after its leader visited politicians from both parties.
