= Deir Mimas =

City in Nabatieh Governorate, Lebanon

Deir Mimas دير ميماس
- Municipality
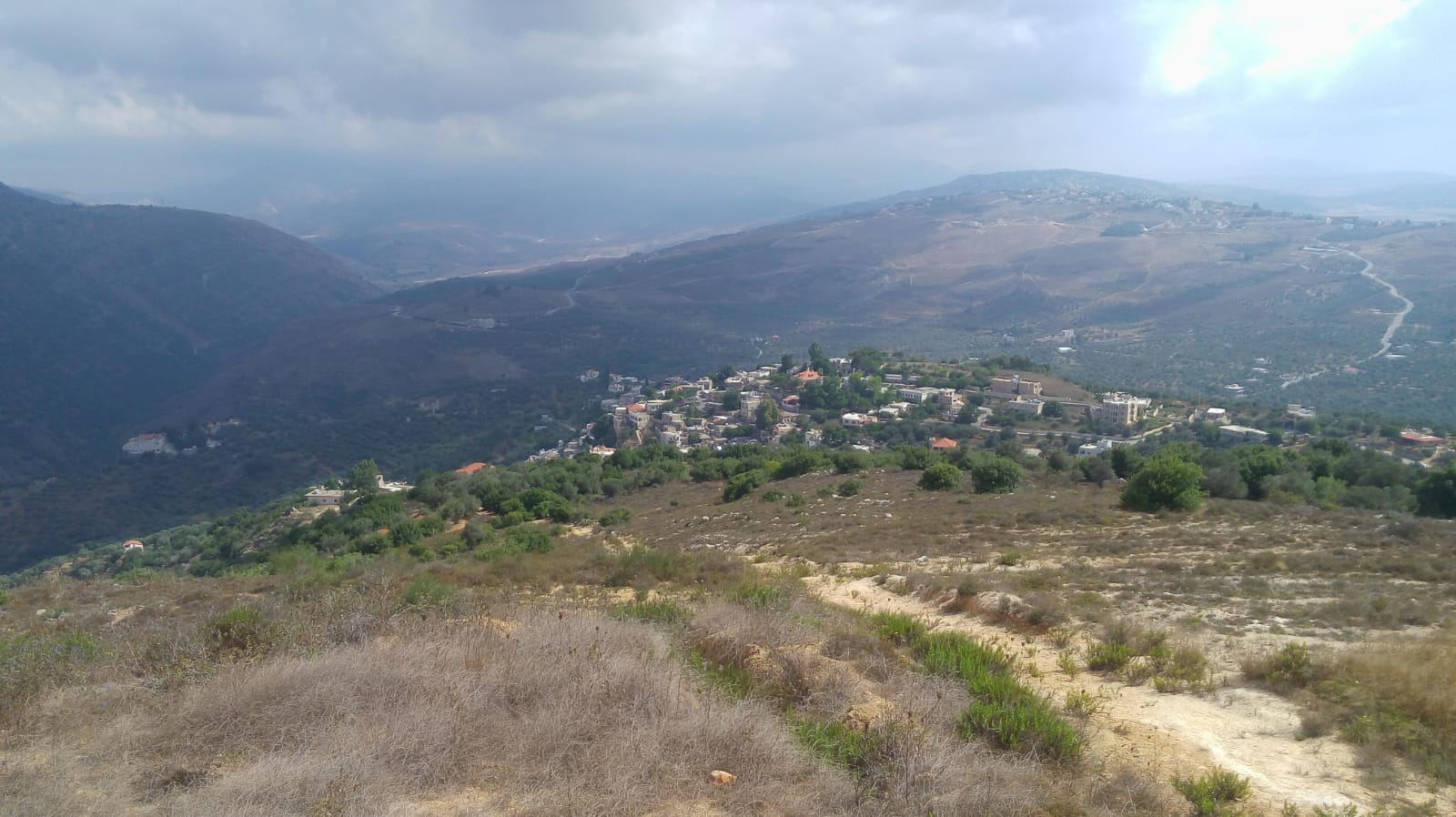
- Deir Mimas

- Location within Lebanon
- Coordinates: 33°18′7″N 35°32′43″E
- Grid position: 131/151 L
- Country: Lebanon
- Governorate: Nabatieh Governorate
- District: Marjayoun District

Government
  - Mayor: Dr. Georges Nakad
- Highest elevation: 650 m (2,130 ft)
- Lowest elevation: 550 m (1,800 ft)
- Time zone: UTC+2 (EET)
  - Summer (DST): UTC+3 (EEST)
- Dialing code: +961
- Website: http://www.deirmimas-lb.com/

Deir Mimas (Arabic: دير ميماس; also spelled Deirmimas, Deir Mamas, and Deir Mimmas) is a municipality 88 km south of Beirut in Lebanon. Named in honor of Saint Mamas, the town overlooks the Litani River and the medieval Beaufort Castle to the west and the snow-capped summits of Mount Hermon to the east. It has a population of around 4,600 people.

== Etymology ==
According to E. H. Palmer the name means: "the convent of Mimâs".

Deir is derivative from the Semitic, meaning house or convent. Mimas refers to Saint Mamas, the third century shepherd who preached Christianity and had a lion as a protector. Saint Mamas became martyr after his examination in the persecutions of Aurelian. In the Middle Ages, a convent was built in honor of Saint Mamas on top of a hill surrounded by olive groves. A village grew around the convent, and it was eventually named in honor of the Convent of Saint Mamas.

== History ==
=== Antiquity and Medieval Period ===
Archaeological surveys in the olive groves surrounding Deir Mimas have identified Roman-era terrace walls and Byzantine ceramic shards, suggesting the site has been inhabited since antiquity. The modern village's history is centered around the Monastery of Saint Mamas, which according to local tradition and ecclesiastical records, was originally constructed circa 1404. The monastery served as a regional religious hub for the Eastern Orthodox Church and later the Melkite Greek Catholic Church.

=== 19th Century and the 1837 Earthquake ===
In the early 19th century, the village was a significant agricultural center for olive oil production in the Marjayoun District. On January 1, 1837, Deir Mimas was severely impacted by the 1837 Galilee earthquake. The seismic activity caused the collapse of numerous stone dwellings and the death of five residents, mirroring the destruction seen in the nearby fortress of Beaufort.

In 1838, Eli Smith noted Deir Mimas's population as Greek Orthodox and Catholic Christians.

In 1852, Edward Robinson noted the village from Beaufort Castle.

In 1875 Victor Guérin visited; the population ascribed to Deir Mimas by Guerin was 1,000. With the exception of twenty Protestants, he says, they were all "Schismatic Greeks".

In 1881, the PEF's Survey of Western Palestine (SWP) described it as: "A village, built of stone, containing about 300 Christians, surrounded by large groves of olives, and gardens of figs, pomegranates, and vineyards, with arable land to the east. There is a modern church in the village, which is well supplied with water from springs."

=== 20th Century Conflict ===
During the May 1920 transition to the French Mandate and the creation of Greater Lebanon, Deir Mimas was raided by Shia militants opposing the new territorial boundaries. As a primarily Greek Orthodox village, it occupied a strategic position on the heights overlooking the Litani River, which forces sought to secure to contest the expansion of the Lebanese state's borders. The incident involved the summary execution of at least two residents, pillaging of agricultural stores and the brief displacement of the inhabitants toward Marjayoun.

Following the 1948 Arab–Israeli War, Deir Mimas became a primary place of refuge for Christian families (primarily Maronite and Melkite) from the Galilee village of Abil al-Qamh. These families, including the Abdo, Keserwany, Harfouch, and Haddad lineages, eventually settled permanently in the village and were granted Lebanese citizenship.

In the late 1960s, the village became a flashpoint for the escalating tension between the state and Palestinian guerrillas:

- October 28, 1969: During nationwide clashes between the Lebanese Armed Forces and the Palestine Liberation Organization (PLO), Palestinian units occupied strategic positions within Deir Mimas. Following the withdrawal of the local Gendarmerie, five residents were summarily executed by paramilitary units as they consolidated control over the border heights—an event that served as a precursor to the Cairo Accord signed the following week.
- January 2, 1970: In an instance of "neutrality-breaking" violence intended to secure logistical support for the "Joint Forces" and end local cooperation with Lebanese Army border patrols, a Greek Orthodox resident was executed by PFLP militants.
- January 2, 1970 (IDF Raid): Concurrently, the Israel Defense Forces (IDF) conducted a ground raid into the village in response to cross-border fire. Several homes were destroyed, further accelerating the displacement of local civilians toward Nabatieh and Beirut.

Between 1982 and 2000, Deir Mimas was located within the Israeli-occupied "Security Belt" and was largely under the administrative influence of the South Lebanon Army (SLA) until the Israeli withdrawal in May 2000.

=== Hezbollah-Israel conflict ===
According to the IDF, Hezbollah documents in the village were found revealing the use of civilians as human shields and providing proof that the organization had military infrastructure in the village. The IDF planted many land mines in the vicinity of the village. In November, two European explosives experts and a Lebanese doctor were injured while trying to rescue a shepherd who had fallen into an unmarked minefield.

Between 23 and 25 December 2023, reports emerged on X (Twitter) which portrayed the IDF shelling the vicinity of the Deir Mimas monastery. Doha News reported on it and said the incident is "signaling a broader pattern of Israeli aggression against religious sites and civilian sanctuaries". The Alma research center in Israel disputed the report, with satellite evidence of alleged Hezbollah use of the monastery's vicinity to launch attacks.

== Modern era ==
=== Agriculture ===
In addition to the cultivation of grapes, and figs, Deir Mimas continues to be a major producer of olives and olive oil. It is home to around 130,000 - 150,000 olive trees some of which date back hundreds of years. Three olive oil press facilities are available providing their services to olive farmers from Deir Mimas and surrounding villages. Olive oil produced in Deir Mimas is known to be as one of the best in Lebanon. Olive Oil produced in Deir Mimas under the name "Mariam's Gold" ranked fourth among the products of more than 80 of the largest producing companies in the world in a contest organized by the German "Biofach 2012″ exhibition at Nuremberg, Germany.

== Demographics ==
As of 2010, the village had a year round population of 800 residents and a population of 1,500 in the summer months. Several thousand others had been displaced to other parts of the country or migrated abroad.

In 2014 Christians made up 98.36% of registered voters in Deir Mimas. 41.38% of the voters were Greek Orthodox, 27.91% were Greek Catholics and 11.95% were Maronite Catholics.

Religion in Deir Mimas
1. Greek Orthodox (40.1%)
2. Greek Catholic (28.3%)
3. Evangelical (8.50%)
4. Maronite Catholic (11.6%)
5. other Christians (11.5%)

The inhabitants of Deir Mimas are Lebanese and followers of the Eastern Orthodox, Presbyterian, and Greek Catholic churches. A small but significant Latin Church following exist in the village in addition to Maronites that are mostly composed of women who have registered in the town after marriage.

One of the most known individuals from Deir Mimas is Dr. George Fawaz, a renowned former pharmacologist at the American University of Beirut. One of the priests who served most of his entire life is buried at the back of the church in Mar Mama. His name was the servant of God Gerges Chammas. The location is behind the church on the east side. He was a great servant and devoted his life to serving Christ and his followers.

=== Holidays ===
In addition to Christmas and Easter, the town celebrates the feast of Saint Mamas on September 15. Grand festivities are organized each year to honor the town's patron saint. Celebrations take place where masses are held at the "Deir" the Convent situated on a hill and facing the mountain and the Litani river.

=== Churches ===
Deirmimas is 70 km far from Nazareth and 170 km far from Jerusalem. The village has seven different churches serving the population:
1. Saint Mamas Monastery for the Greek Orthodox
2. Saint Michel Church for the Greek Orthodox
3. Saint Mamas Church for the Melkite Catholics
4. Santa Maria Monastery for the Latin Catholics
5. Santa Maria Church for the Latin Catholics
6. Protestant Church
7. Deirmimas Baptist Church

==== Saint Mamas Monastery for the Greek Orthodox ====
The monastery of St. Mema from which Deirmimas takes its name was built around 1404 A.D. The original monastery was a simple medieval construction with 6 monks' cells, situated by a small church. The monastery fell into decay and was restored a number of times, most recently in 2004 before it was totally demolished during the 2006 Israeli war on Lebanon. The present plan for the reconstruction of the site, which has been financed by Qatar, began in 2008 and has replaced the old monastery with a much larger construction. The site has been inaugurated by the ruler of Qatar and the Lebanese authorities in 2010. Since, the Monastery is open daily to all devotees and visitors from 9:00am to 7:00pm.

Unlike the West, where Christmas ranks supreme, in the East it is Easter, centered on the cross and the resurrection of Christ. Another supreme festival of the year is the St. Mema's festival on 15 September. On that day people take part in divine liturgy, after which they gather around for outdoor feast where everyone joins in to eat, drink and enjoy themselves.

The monastery is placed under the direction of Father Salim Assaad, who restored the damaged facility into a place of worship and a small iconography museum. For Orthodox Christians, icons represent sacred religious art. The Monastery of St. Mema features mosaics depicting the life of Christ and houses these icons.

=== Diaspora ===
Deir Mimas has a population of around 4,600 people, though descendants of the village whom live outside the country are estimated to be between 7,000 and 10,000 with strong diaspora in the United States, France, Brazil, Australia and Canada. It is believed that in the late 1800s people from the village began to emigrate to the United States and found their way in Lansing, Michigan to work in the booming automobile industry.

== Municipality ==
The municipality of Deir Mimas was founded in 1961 launching its activities with a team of two employees and six municipal council members elected along with the first Mayor Mr. Phillipe Awdeh.

During the Israeli occupation of South Lebanon, the municipality was care-taken by the Governor of Marjeyoun from 1969 until Israel's withdrawal from south Lebanon. Post-occupation election were held in 2001.

Many international and national organizations assisted the municipality, most notably UNIFIL, the Spanish Government, the Qatari Government and the Mines Advisory Group.

List of Mayors of Deir Mimas
Name	Took lead	lead ended
Phillipe Awdeh	1961	1969
Led by the Governors of Marjeyoun	1969	2001
Sami Al-Ghazzi	2001	2004
Dr. Kamel Morkos	2004	2010
Jean Hourani	2010	2013
Walid Hasbani	2013	2016
Dr. Georges Nakad	2016	2025
Dr. Souheil Abou Jamra	2025	2026

== People from Deir Mimas ==
- Souha Bechara – Left-wing attempted assassin
- John Makhoul – Computer scientist
- Rola Nashef – American director, screenwriter, producer and multimedia artist based in Detroit

== See also ==
- Saint Mamas
- List of extrajudicial killings and political violence in Lebanon
- Cairo Agreement (1969)
- Fatahland
- Palestinian insurgency in South Lebanon
- Marjayoun District
- Litani River
- Agriculture in Lebanon

== Bibliography ==
- Conder, C.R.; Kitchener, H.H. (1881). The Survey of Western Palestine: Memoirs of the Topography, Orography, Hydrography, and Archaeology. Vol. 1. London: Committee of the Palestine Exploration Fund.
- Guérin, V. (1880). Description Géographique Historique et Archéologique de la Palestine (in French). Vol. 3: Galilee, pt. 2. Paris: L'Imprimerie Nationale.
- Palmer, E.H. (1881). The Survey of Western Palestine: Arabic and English Name Lists Collected During the Survey by Lieutenants Conder and Kitchener, R. E. Transliterated and Explained by E.H. Palmer. Committee of the Palestine Exploration Fund.
- Robinson, E.; Smith, E. (1841). Biblical Researches in Palestine, Mount Sinai and Arabia Petraea: A Journal of Travels in the year 1838. Vol. 3. Boston: Crocker & Brewster.
- Robinson, E.; Smith, E. (1856). Later Biblical Researches in Palestine and adjacent regions: A Journal of Travels in the year 1852. London: John Murray.
