= Yusuf Yazbek =

Lebanese politician (1901–1982)

Secretary General of the Lebanese People’s Party
- In office 30 April 1925 – 1926
- Preceded by: Office established
- Succeeded by: Fuad Shimali

Personal details
- Born: Yusuf Ibrahim Yazbek; 1901
- Died: 1982 (aged 80–81)
- Party: Lebanese Communist Party (1924–1926)

Yusuf Yazbek (1901–1982) was a Lebanese journalist and politician who cofounded the Lebanese People's Party which was the forerunner of the Syrian–Lebanese Communist Party. He also involved in the establishment of the Syrian–Lebanese Communist Party.

== Early life ==
Yazbek was born in 1901. He hailed from a Maronite family. He stayed in Mexico during his childhood, where he met a Lebanese poet and journalist Said Akl. Yazbek and Said Akl returned to Lebanon before World War I. Then Yazbek joined the opposition groups against the Ottoman rule in the region, and Akl launched a newspaper, Al Bayrak, in 1911.

== Career and activities ==
Yazbek worked as a secretary-interpreter in the Department of Emigration at the Beirut port. In the period between 1922 and 1924, he was one of the editors of a semi-weekly labor newspaper entitled Al-Ṣaḥafi al-Taʼih (Arabic: The Wandering Journalist) based in Zahlé, Lebanon. He published his articles using the pseudonym the Weeping Ghost. He also wrote for a journal entitled Al Marad. In October 1924, he and Fuad Shimali, a Lebanese tobacco worker, established the Lebanese People’s Party which would be renamed as Lebanese Communist Party in the 1940s. It was approved by the authorities as a legal political party on 30 April 1925. Yazbek was elected as its secretary general and resigned from his job at the port. He and others in the central committee of the party launched a weekly newspaper entitled Al-Insaniyyah (Arabic: Humanity) which was one of the early communist publications in Lebanon. Yazbek was named as its editor-in-chief. However, the paper was closed by the French authorities after publishing five issues on 17 June 1925. In the aftermath of this incident Yazbek left Lebanon for France in July 1925 and began to work for L'Humanité newspaper in Paris.

Yazbek was removed from the Communist Party in 1926, and Shimali succeeded him as the secretary general. Yazbek returned to the country in December 1926. He was among the founders of the Syrian Lebanese Communist Party which was established by the split groups from the Lebanese People’s Party and the Spartacus Group, an Armenian Bolshevik party. He and Artin Madoyan were both arrested by the French mandatory forces in the late 1926 and imprisoned on the island of Arwad until 1928.

== Later years and death ==
Yazbek cofounded an organization named the League Against Nazism and Fascism in Syria and Lebanon in May 1939. He was also instrumental in the establishment of the organization's magazine entitled Al Tariq in 1941. He was one of the leftist figures who gave lectures in Beirut's Cénacle Hall in the late 1940s. He died in 1982.

=== Work ===
Yazbek was the author of the book entitled Hikayat awwal nuwwar fi al-'alam fi lubnan (Arabic: The Story of May Day in the World and in Lebanon) which was published in Beirut in 1974. He also published another book, The Conference of Martyrs, in 1955.
