= Hanna Gharib =

Lebanese communist leader

Hanna Gharib حنا غريب
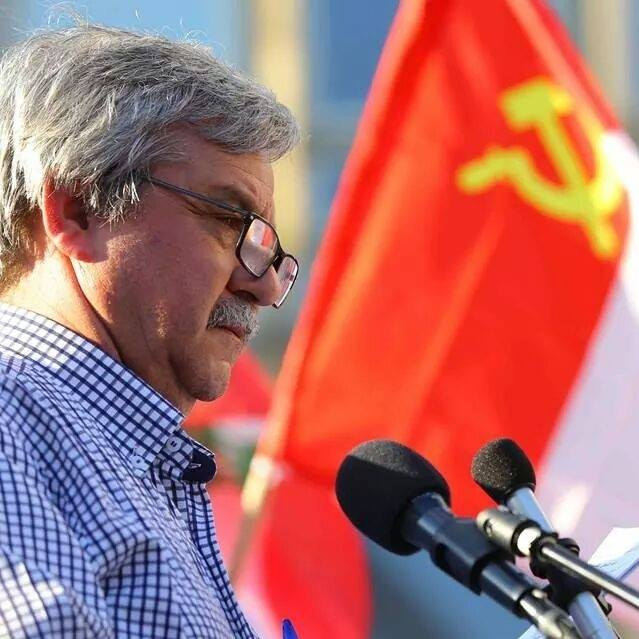

General secretary of the Lebanese Communist Party
- Incumbent
- Assumed office April 2016
- Preceded by: Khaled Hadadi

Personal details
- Born: 28 September 1953 (age 72) Halba, Akkar
- Party: Lebanese Communist Party
- Spouse: Wafaa Bitar
- Education: Collège Saint Elie Btina
- Occupation: Teacher and politician

Hanna Gharib (Arabic: حنا غريب, romanized: Ḥannā Gharīb; born 28 ٍSeptember 1953) is a Lebanese politician and the current general secretary of the Lebanese Communist Party (LCP).

== Early life and education ==
Gharib was born in September 1953 in the city of Tripoli in Northern Lebanon to a poor family of six children. His father was a Lebanese army soldier. After the retirement of his father from the army, the family moved to Rahbeh, their original town in Akkar in the north where he joined its official primary and secondary school.

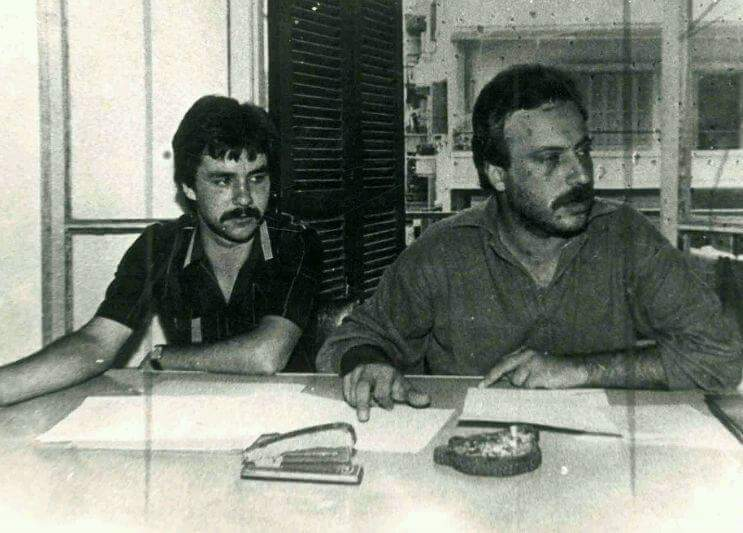
Gharib in the Union of Lebanese Democratic Youth

During this period Gharib joined the Union of Lebanese Democratic Youth, a secular left-wing youth organization where he met with communists who attracted him with their ideas of social justice and equality. He continued his university studies in the Lebanese University in Beirut, where he studied chemistry in the faculty of education.

== Career ==
After graduation, Gharib became a public secondary school teacher in chemistry, first in the city of Saida in the south where he taught Ibrahime Al-Amine, the current general director of Akhbar newspaper. Afterwards, he moved to teach in Beirut in the public and the private sectors. He remained an active teacher despite the big load that he had after becoming the Leader of the League of Public Secondary Teachers and later the coordinator of the Syndicate Coordination Committee that was formed between the union and leagues of public and private teachers and the public employees. Under his leadership, the unions organized continuous demonstrations demanding increases in the wages and proposing progressive taxes and more taxation on the interests and real estate companies. The popular movements lasted from 2012 until 2015 with diverse actions including sit-ins, demonstrations, and general strikes. In addition to the governmental and presidential palaces, the ministry of finance and the ministry of education, the demonstrations reached the economic ports of the country like the sea port and the airport.

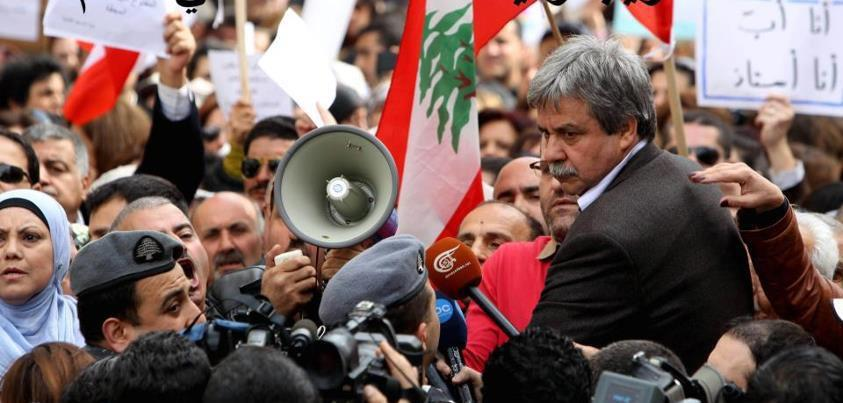
Gharib leading a demonstration for teachers and public employees

Due to escalating discourse and action against the government and persisting stances on the rights of the teachers and employees, the political parties loyal to the government formed a large coalition in the teachers syndicate elections to defeat Hanna Gharib and they succeeded in doing so after forming a list supported by 11 parties against the list of Gharib which got 46% of the votes despite all odds. This ended Gharib's career in the leadership of the unions.

During this time, Gharib was a leading member of the Lebanese Communist Party where he raised in ranks to its central committee then its political bureau for two terms. With increased public presence and media coverage, he was a well-known public figure in Lebanon especially among the communists and left-wing supporters.

After the party's 11th conference in April 2016, Gharib was elected by consensus as the general secretary of the party. He is the seventh leader of the party after Fuad Shemali, Farajallah el-Helou, Nicolas Shawi, George Hawi, Farouk Dahrouj, and Khaled Hadadi.

== Personal life ==
Gharib is married to Wafaa Bitar, the daughter of Isber Bitar who was one of the historical figures of the Lebanese Communist Party. He has a son, Walid, and a daughter, Hala.

== See also ==
- Lebanese Communist Party
- Union of Lebanese Democratic Youth
- Politics of Lebanon
