= Lebanese People's Party =

Lebanese People's Party حزب الشعب اللبناني
- Founded: 24 October 1924
- Dissolved: 16 June 1925
- Succeeded by: Syrian–Lebanese Communist Party
- Ideology: Communism

The Lebanese People's Party (Arabic: حزب الشعب اللبناني) was the first formally organized communist party in the Arab world. It was established 24 October 1924 by nine people, prominent among them Joseph Berger-Barzilai, Yusuf Yazbek and Fuad Shamali. The LPP published the leftist weekly newspaper al-Insaniyyah ("Humanity"), also the first of its kind in the Arab world. The first edition was published 15 May 1925, but it lasted only five issues as the French colonial authorities shut it down on 16 June 1925.

The LPP later merged with the Armenian group "Spartacus" to create the Syrian–Lebanese Communist Party. The first meeting of the new party, which was attended by 15 representatives, was held in secret on 9 December 1925.

== Sources ==
- Ismael, Tareq Y., and Jacqueline S. Ismael. The Communist Movement in Syria & Lebanon. Gainesville: University Press of Florida, 1998. (ISBN 0813016312).
