= Khiam detention center =

Former army barracks complex in southern Lebanon

Coordinates: 33.32083871°N 35.60833633°E

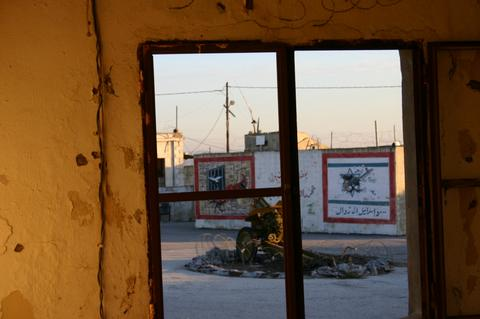
Al-Khiam detention camp, Southern Lebanon, 2004

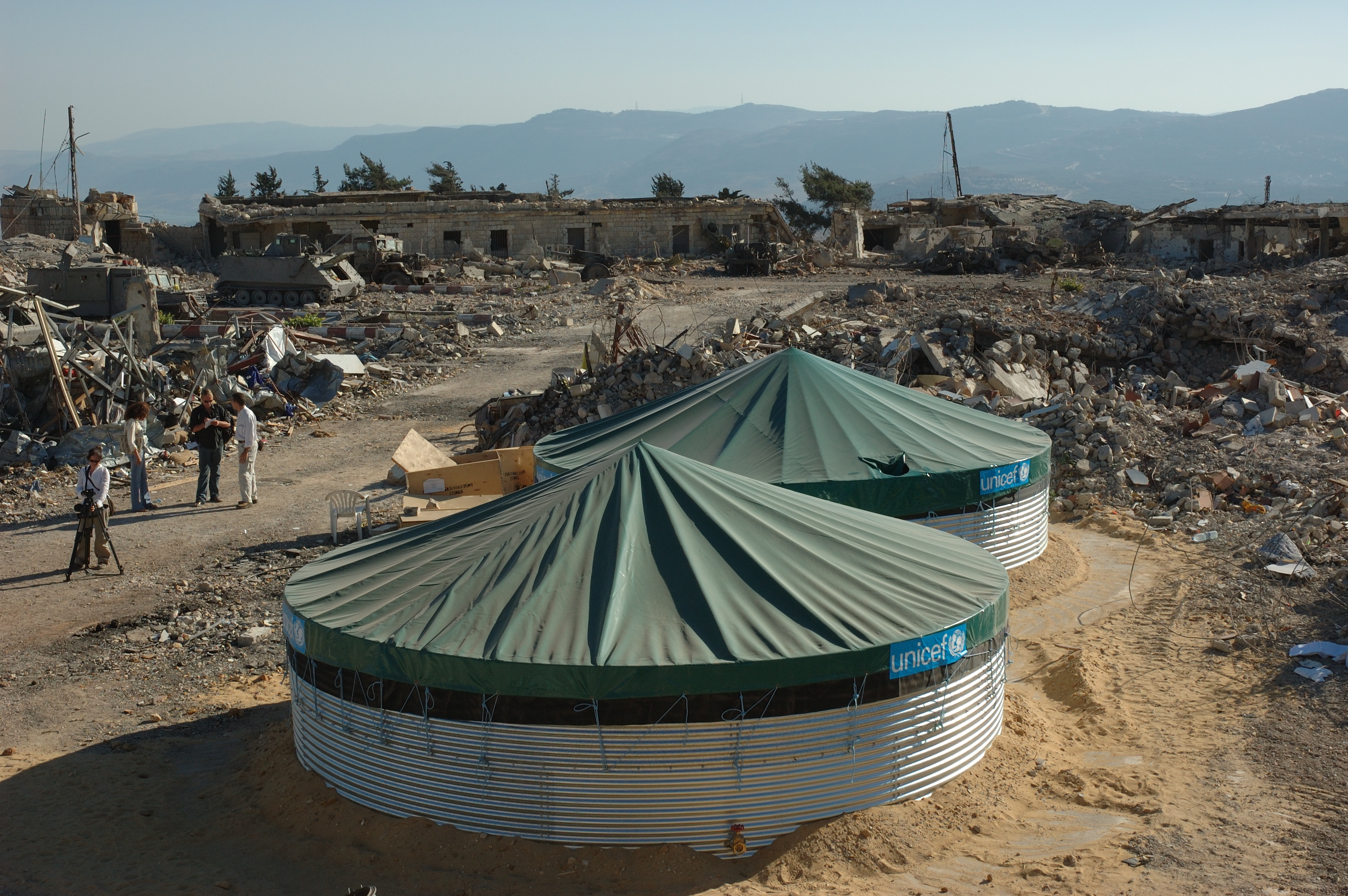
Remains of the detention center shortly after the 2006 Lebanon War, behind UNICEF tents

The Khiam detention center (Arabic: سجن الخيام) was an army barracks complex originally used by the French military in the 1930s in Khiam, French Lebanon. Following the establishment of independent Lebanon in 1946, it was used by the Lebanese military until the outbreak of the Lebanese Civil War in 1975, during which time it came under the control of the South Lebanon Army (SLA), an Israel-backed Lebanese Christian militia. With the beginning of the South Lebanon conflict in 1985, the base was converted into a prisoner-of-war camp and used to hold captured anti-Israel activists and militants who were mainly members of the Lebanese Communist Party, the Amal movement, and other leftist organizations. The facility remained in use in this capacity until Israel's withdrawal from Lebanon in May 2000 and the subsequent collapse of the SLA. After the Israeli withdrawal, the camp was preserved in the condition it was abandoned in, and converted into a museum by the Lebanese government.

During the 2006 Lebanon War, the Israeli Air Force bombed and destroyed the museum, alleged by locals to have been carried out in an attempt to hide the evidence of torture and mistreatment used there.

Satellite imagery taken in March 2026 during the 2026 Lebanon war showed the remains of the complex being demolished. In August 2026, Haaretz reported that a military base was built by the IDF on the former prison site.

Amnesty International and Human Rights Watch reported the use of torture and other serious human rights abuses at the facility.

== Torture accounts ==
British journalist Robert Fisk, who spent 25 years reporting from Lebanon, stated about human rights abuses at the center:

“The sadists of Khiam used to electrocute the penises of their prisoners and throw water over their bodies before plunging electrodes into their chests and kept them in pitch-black, solitary confinement for months. For many years, the Israelis even banned the Red Cross from visiting their foul prison. All the torturers fled across the border into Israel when the Israeli army retreated under fire from Lebanon almost seven years ago.”

“There was the whipping pole and the window grilles where prisoners were tied naked for days, freezing water thrown over them at night. Then there were the electric leads for the little dynamo — the machine mercifully taken off to Israel by the interrogators — which had the inmates shrieking with pain when the electrodes touched their fingers or penises. And there were the handcuffs which an ex-prisoner handed to me yesterday afternoon. They were used over years to bind the arms of prisoners before interrogation. And they wore them, day and night, as they were kicked — kicked so badly in Suleiman Ramadan's case that they later had to amputate his arm. Another prisoner was so badly beaten, he lost the use of a leg. I found his crutch in Khiam prison yesterday, along with piles of Red Cross letters from prisoners — letters which the guards from Israel's now-defunct "South Lebanon Army" militia never bothered to forward”.

According to some media reports, some prison cells had small metal cages, inside which the prison guards would make detainees sit before repeatedly hitting the cage from the outside, sometimes for hours, as a form of mental torture.

Israel had denied any involvement in Khiam, allegedly claiming to have delegated operation of the detention camp to the South Lebanon Army (SLA) as early as 1988. The Israeli Defense Ministry acknowledged during this time that personnel from the Shin Bet "hold meetings several times annually with SLA interrogators" and "cooperate with members of the SLA, and even assist them by means of professional guidance and training". It also admitted that Israel and the SLA "consult each other regarding the arrest and release of people in the Khiam facility". In a court case brought by Israeli human rights lawyers, the Israeli Defense Ministry admitted paying staff at Khiam, training the interrogators and guards, and providing assistance with lie detector tests.

According to American activist Noam Chomsky, Israel didn't allow access to the Red Cross or other human rights organizations to the Khiam "horror chamber" despite "ample evidence of hideous and savage torture".

== Notable inmates ==
- Souha Bechara

== See also ==
- United Nations Interim Force in Lebanon
