= Rola Nashef =

American film producer

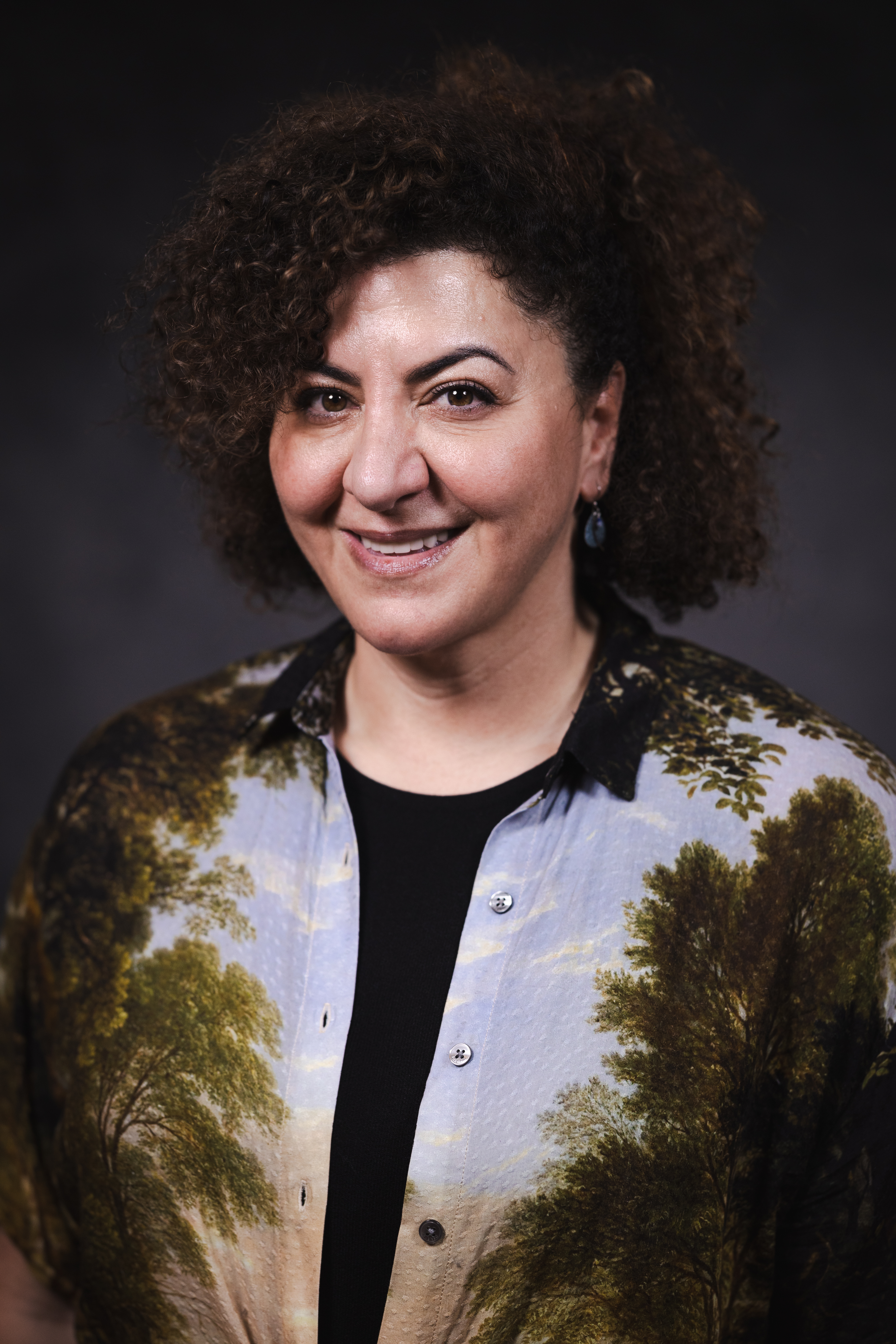
- Born: Sidon, Lebanon
- Occupations: Director, Screenwriter, Producer and Artist
- Years active: 2012–present

Rola Nashef is an American director, screenwriter, producer and multimedia artist based in Detroit. She is best known for her award-winning film, Detroit Unleaded.

== Early life ==
Nashef was born in Sidon, Lebanon to Franco and Salima Nashef. Her father Franco is from Maghdouché, where her mother Salima is from Deir Mimas; both small Christian villages in the south of Lebanon. In 1978, her family fled the Lebanese Civil War and immigrated to the United States where they settled in Lansing, Michigan where her father worked as a skilled tradesmen at General Motors.

Nashef graduated from Waverly High School and went on to study at Lansing Community College. She then attended Michigan State University, Madonna University and Oakland Community College where she studied political science, marketing research, paralegal studies, sociology, accounting, art and photography, before graduating from the Motion Picture Institute in [1997] with a degree in Directing and Producing.

== Career ==
Nashef's debut short film, 8:30, is a romantic comedy short film that was presented at the Arab Screen Independent Film Festival in Doha, Qatar during 2001. She raised 20,000 through a letter writing fundraising campaign to develop and direct her second short film, Detroit Unleaded, which won “Best Short Film” at the Trinity Film Festival and "Best Performance" at the New Haven Underground Film Festival.

As a slice-of-life dramedy that centers around an Arab-owned 24-hour gas station, Detroit Unleaded holds its place in American cinema history as the very first Arab-American romantic comedy portraying second generation Arab characters specific to Detroit and Dearborn. The film premiered in 2012 at the Toronto International Film Festival and won the inaugural Grolsch Film Works Discovery Award. Prior to its release, Detroit Unleaded was supported by the Sundance Institute Screenwriters Lab, IFP New York, Lincoln Center and the A2E Distribution Lab, SFFS.

Nashef worked and served as a multimedia artist on Facing Identity, a permanent installation in the Arab American National Museum.

She is currently a Professor of Practice in Michigan State University's College of Communication Arts and Sciences.

== Awards ==
- Adrienne Shelly Directors Award, Adrienne Shelly Foundation, 2015
- Kresge Arts in Detroit Fellowship Award, 2014
- Adrienne Shelley Director's Award for her script NADIA'S HOUSE, 2014
- Best Feature for Detroit Unleaded, American Spectrum, Indianapolis International Film Festival, 2013
- Audience Award for Detroit Unleaded, Twin Cities Arab Film Festival, 2013
- Grolsch Film Works Discovery Award, Toronto International Film Festival, 2012
- Named one of the "25 New Faces of Independent Film", Filmmaker Magazine, 2011
