= Saadallah Mazraani =

Lebanese Politician

Saadallah Mazraani (Arabic: سعدالله مزرعاني, romanized: Saʿdallāh Mazrʿānī) is the Vice General Secretary of the Lebanese Communist Party since its 8th congress in 1998. He was nominated for parliamentary elections for several times in South Lebanon and scored a considerable number of votes every time he ran, but never succeeded in winning a parliamentary seat. In the last elections in 2005, he got 8,886 votes in the second district without success.

He was the General Secretary of the General Union of the Students of the Lebanese University from 1971 to 1973, then the General Secretary of the Union of Lebanese Democratic Youth (ULDY) from 1974 to 1978. He is also a member of the Political Bureau of the Lebanese Communist Party since 1976 till now, and a member of the central council of the Lebanese National Movement from 1982 to 1987. Mazraani also writes a weekly article in Al Akhbar newspaper and in several public and partisan papers.
