= Al-Ṣaḥafi al-Taʼih =

Lebanese satirical newspaper

Al-Ṣaḥafi al-Taʼih (الصحفي التائه The Wandering Journalist) was a Lebanese satirical newspaper.

The paper was founded around 1922 by two Lebanese Christians, Iskandar Riyadh and Yusuf Yazbek.
