= Socialist Lebanon =

Political organization in Lebanon

Socialist Lebanon (Arabic: لبنان الاشتراكي, Lubnān al-ištirākī) was a Marxist group in Lebanon. The group was formed in 1965 by intellectuals and academicians including Ahmad Beydoun, Waddah Sharara, and Fawwaz Traboulsi.

In 1970 the group merged with the Organization of Lebanese Socialists, and formed the Communist Action Organization in Lebanon.
