= Soha Bechara =

Lebanese Communist Party member and former POW (born 1967)

- سهى بشارة
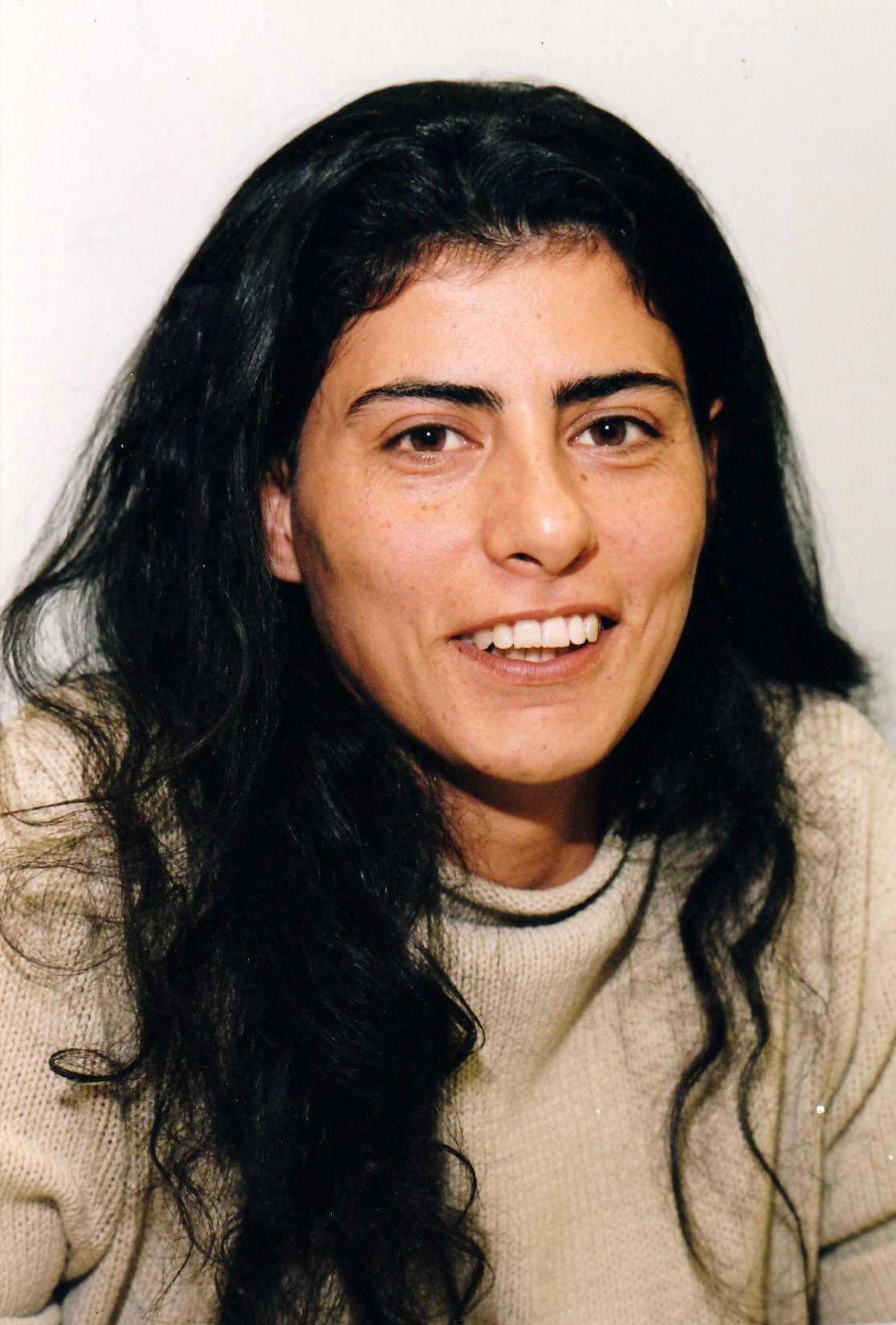
- Bechara in 2000
- Born: June 15, 1967 (age 59); Deir Mimas, Lebanon
- Occupation: Writer
- Organizations: Lebanese Communist Party; Lebanese National Resistance Front
- Known for: Attempting to assassinate Antoine Lahad; being detained at the Khiam detention center from 1988–98
- Political party: Lebanese Communist Party
- Other political affiliations: Jammoul; Union of Lebanese Democratic Youth
- Children: 2

Soha Bechara (Arabic: سهى بشارة, romanized: Sohā Beshāra; born 15 June 1967) is a Lebanese national who became known for her 1988 unsuccessful attempted assassination of former Lebanese Army Major General Antoine Lahad, the leader of the South Lebanon Army (SLA). After dropping out of school, she joined the armed wing of the Soviet-financed and PLO-supported Lebanese Communist Party (LCP) under the Lebanese National Resistance Front (Jammoul) military coalition. She then duped Lahad's wife into befriending her, posing as an aerobics instructor, so as to get close enough to kill her husband.

On November 17, 1988, Bechara shot Lahad twice, inflicting severe internal trauma that resulted in the permanent paralysis of his left arm. She was immediately arrested and subsequently detained for ten years at the SLA-administered Khiam Detention Center in Lebanon without formal criminal charges or a trial. Following a campaign by various groups, she was released in September 1998.

== Early life ==
Bechara was born in Deir Mimas, Lebanon, to a Greek Orthodox Christian family. Her father was an active member of the Lebanese Communist Party, which Bechara herself also joined secretly in 1982. During the Israeli occupation of Southern Lebanon, she was active in various leftist political and militant movements, including the armed umbrella coalition of the Jammoul and the Union of Lebanese Democratic Youth.

== Failed assassination attempt ==
Bechara dropped out of college in 1986. She then joined the armed wing of the Soviet-financed and PLO-supported Lebanese Communist Party (LCP). The LCP operated under the umbrella military coalition of the leftist PLO-aligned Lebanese National Resistance Front (Jammoul).

She was given the task of assassinating Antoine Lahad, a former Lebanese Army Major General. He was the leader of the South Lebanon Army, which frequently engaged in armed clashes with the PLO. Bechara relocated to south Lebanon, and introduced herself to Lahad's wife as an aerobics instructor. Bechara befriended the wife over a number of months, so as to get close enough to kill her husband.

On the evening of 17 November 1988, Lahad's wife invited Bechara for tea. Bechara accepted and stayed until Lahad arrived home. In their living room, in front of his wife, Bechara shot Lahad twice with a Soviet 5.45×18mm caliber PSM pistol. Lahad's wife threw herself over her husband to protect him from further shots. Lahad's guards then burst into the room, disarmed Bechara, and arrested her.

Lahad was airlifted to a hospital and spent eight weeks there, undergoing critical trauma treatment and specialized surgeries. The bullets had penetrated his arm, shoulder, and upper thoracic region, inflicting significant internal damage. His left arm was permanently paralyzed. Additionally, he was left with chronic speech and vocal complications for the remainder of his life.

Bechara was taken to Israel briefly, where she was interrogated. She was then returned to southern Lebanon, where the Southern Lebanese Army confined her at the SLA-administered Khiam Detention Center for ten years, without formal criminal charges or a judicial trial. In Lebanon, she was subjected to interrogation techniques that included electric shocks, and six years of solitary confinement in a tiny restricted isolation cell. Bechara was released on September 3, 1998, following an intense Lebanese and European campaign.

== Sanctions and transit restrictions ==
Bechara has been subjected to official security sanctions by Western governments. This culminated in July 2023 when Greek border authorities at the Athens International Airport briefly detained Bechara while she was in transit to Switzerland, where she holds citizenship, and instead deported her back to Lebanon. Greek immigration officials officially designated her a persona non grata and barred her from exiting transit or continuing her travel, under the justification that she "poses a threat to Greek national security."

== Private life ==
After her release, Bechara moved to France and then to Geneva, Switzerland, where she married a Swiss national, with whom she has two children.

=== Writing ===
In 2000, she published her autobiography, Résistante, relating her early life and her years in jail, with English and Arabic translations following in 2003. In 2011, Bechara published another autobiography, whose Arabic title translates as I Dream of a Cell of Cherries. Her co-author, Cosette Elias Ibrahim, is a Lebanese freelance journalist who was detained in the Khiam prison for nine months.

Parts of Bechara's story were used in Wajdi Mouawad's 2003 play Incendies, which Denis Villeneuve adapted to the screen in his 2010 film of the same title.
