= Al-Hurriya (newspaper) =

Palestinian left-wing newspaper (established 1960)

- Type: Daily Newspaper
- Format: Print, online
- Owner(s): Democratic Front for the Liberation of Palestine
- Founded: 1960
- Political alignment: Palestinian nationalism
- Language: Arabic
- Website: www.alhourriah.org

Al-Hurriya (Arabic: الحرية), (freedom) variously transcribed as al-Hourriya, al-Hurriyeh, etc.) is a Palestinian political newspaper affiliated with the Marxist-Leninist Democratic Front for the Liberation of Palestine (DFLP). First published in Beirut, Lebanon on January 4, 1960, by the Arab Nationalist Movement (ANM), under the editorship of Muhsin Ibrahim it became increasingly socialist, against the opposition of ANM founders and older members.

In 1969 al-Hurriya became the joint organ of the DFLP and the Communist Action Organization in Lebanon. Since 1977 it is the central organ of DFLP.
