= Elias Atallah =

Lebanese politician (born 1947)

Elias G. Atallah (Arabic: إلياس عطا الله; born 1947) is a Lebanese politician and an elected member of parliament since the 2005 elections. He is also the chairperson of the Democratic Left Movement, and a prominent member in the March 14 Alliance. He was born in the Chouf region, and has a degree in psychology and philosophy from the Lebanese University.

== Political activities ==
He joined the Lebanese Communist Party in 1971, and was a prominent member in the Lebanese National Movement that included George Hawi, Kamal Jumblatt and other Lebanese leftist politicians and intellectuals. In 1982, he took part in the resistance against the Israeli invasion of Lebanon. As of 2000, he was the leader of the party.

His fierce criticism against the Lebanese Communist Party's policies, especially its positive attitude towards the Syrian occupation of Lebanon and its communist ideology, led him in 2004 to form, with a group of Lebanese intellectuals including Samir Kassir, the Democratic Left Movement. He was elected as its chairperson on 17 October 2004 and was reelected in April 2007.

After the Syrian army withdrew from Lebanon, he was elected as the representative of the Maronite seat in Tripoli, during the 2005 Lebanese parliamentary elections. Thus, he became the first MP to represent a leftist secular political party in the Lebanese parliament.

== See also ==
- Cedar Revolution
- March 14 Alliance
- Democratic Left Movement
- Lebanese National Movement
