= Union of Lebanese Democratic Youth =

Union of Lebanese Democratic Youth اتحاد الشباب الديمقراطي اللبناني
- Abbreviation: ULDY/UJDL
- Founded: 1970
- Headquarters: Mar Elias, Beirut
- Ideology: Anti-imperialism; Anti-capitalism; Secularism
- Political position: Left-wing
- National affiliation: March 8 Alliance
- International affiliation: World Federation of Democratic Youth
- Slogan: شباب يناضل من أجل العدالة الاجتماعية; For Homeland Guarantees its Youth's Rights

Union of Lebanese Democratic Youth (ULDY) (Arabic: اتحاد الشباب الديمقراطي اللبناني, romanized: Ittiḥād ash-Shabāb ad-Dīmuqrāṭī al-Lubnānī, also known as UJDL (the French abbreviation of Union de la jeunesse démocratique libanaise), is a Lebanese leftist secular democratic youth organization as it defines itself in its documents. ULDY was legally established in 1970 by leftist—mainly communist—students and young activists, after being active underground since 1945.

ULDY is a member in many regional and international youth organizations, but its main affiliation is to the World Federation of Democratic Youth (WFDY). ULDY is the vice president of WFDY since March 2007 after a long history of international action. It was the president of WFDY during the late 1980s before and during the collapse of the Soviet Union.

Many prominent leftist leaders and activists in Lebanon were affiliated to ULDY during their early political life including Anwar Yassin (detained by Israel) and Souha Bechara (an attempted assassin detained in South Lebanon for ten years), Saadallah Mazraani (the Vice General-Secretary of the Lebanese Communist Party since 1998) and Hanna Gharib (the former President of Union of High School Teachers in Lebanon).

== Activities ==
After the 6th National Congress, ULDY made several distinguished activities including:

- Popular aid to thousands of internally displaced people due to the Israeli aggression against Lebanon during July and August 2006.
- Hosting the Coordinating Council meeting of WFDY in November 2006 in Beirut with the participation of tens of international leftist and communist organizations and hundreds of attendants from Lebanon.
- Several camps hosting hundreds of participants in Summer of 2007.
- "The Spring March" that toured Lebanon for 34 consecutive days in the summer of 2008 under the slogan of "All of Lebanon is for us all" and demanding the unity of the Lebanese people across the sectarian division lines drawn by the Lebanese political and social system.
- An open solidarity protest for 24 days near the UN offices in ESCWA building in downtown Beirut during the Israeli aggression against Gaza from December 25, 2008 to January 18, 2009. During this period several demonstrations, protests and solidarity events were held in Beirut and across Lebanon, mainly towards the Egyptian, U.S. and Canadian embassies in addition to the EU commission and Arab League representatives, in collaboration with other Lebanese and Palestinian leftist youth organizations.
- ULDY organizes a set of youth camps every summer which include Educational, Dialogue, Pioneers, Artistic and Voluntary work camps throughout Lebanon.
- In the beginning of 2011, ULDY together with some other left-wing organizations and activists organized a campaign to support the Arab revolutions especially during the peak of the revolutions of Egypt, Tunisia, Libya, Yemen and Bahrain. The campaign conducted different protests in front of the embassies and consulates of those countries and had a daily protest in front of the Egyptian embassy including the day when the demonstrators tried to enter the embassy.
- ULDY was an effective and leading factor in the campaign to change the sectarian regime in Lebanon. Five central demonstrations were organized in Beirut and three others in Saida, Tripoli and Byblos between February 27 and June 26, 2011. The biggest demonstration of the campaign had around 30.000 protestors in the streets of Beirut on March 20, 2011.

== Organization ==
ULDY has currently 26 branches around Lebanon, with another 10 branches under establishment. It also has 4 central departments for young workers, university students, high school students and pioneers. Membership is accepted through branches so that every member should commit to one of the existing branches. In addition, a member is considered automatically to belong to one of the departments related to his study or work.

The branches are organized through regional committees that have coordinating status within its geographical region. Now ULDY has 5 regional committees that are: Beirut and suburbs, Mount Lebanon, Bekaa, North Lebanon and South Lebanon.

The highest body in ULDY is its congress held every three years to draw the general policies and organization of ULDY and elect its legislative and directive body, the National Council.

The National Council is elected by the congress and convenes regularly every two months to draw short term plans of the organization and watch the sound action and functioning of all other organs of ULDY. The National Council elects a President, Vice President, a General secretary and an Executive Bureau of the organization.

The Executive Bureau convenes every two weeks to pursue the daily action of the organization, apply the plans drawn by the National Council and represent the organization legally and practically between meetings of the National Council.

== Congresses ==
After several years of not having regular congresses due to many political and organizational problems, especially after the collapse of the Soviet Union and the Lebanese Civil War, ULDY had its 5th National Congress in May 2003. The congress was intended to revive the bodies of the organization and put it back to strong action. This two-year experience set the ground for the 6th National Congress that brought real life to ULDY.

ULDY had its 6th National Congress in May, 2005 and elected Imad Bawab as President and Arabi Andari as General Secretary. It brought all the constituents of the organization to action and put it back on the political map in Lebanon especially after the big activities and new leadership spirit that it had.

In its 7th National Congress in September 2008, ULDY renewed its bodies with many new young activists. 24 out of its 41 National Council members and 10 out of its 11 Executive Bureau members were renewed, with Imad Bawab remaining president and Hussein Mroue elected as a new General Secretary.

== Bibliography ==
- Tom Najem and Roy C. Amore, Historical Dictionary of Lebanon, Second Edition, Historical Dictionaries of Asia, Oceania, and the Middle East, Rowman & Littlefield Publishers, Lanham, Boulder, New York & London 2021. ISBN 9781538120439, 1538120437
