= George Hawi =

Lebanese communist politician (1938–2005)

- جورج حاوي
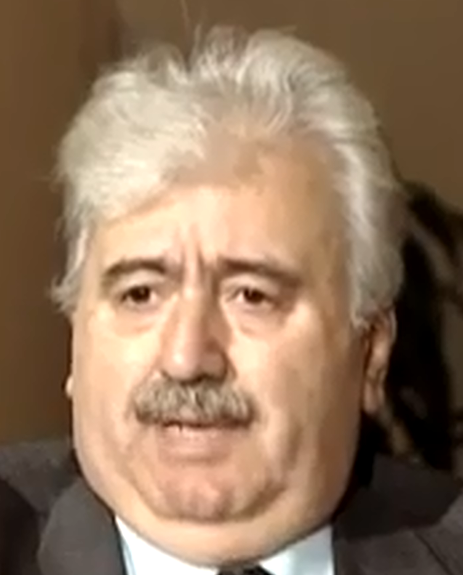

General Secretary of the Lebanese Communist Party (1979–1993)
- Preceded by: Nicolas Shawi
- Succeeded by: Farouk Dahrouj

Personal details
- Born: 5 November 1938 Bteghrine, Greater Lebanon
- Died: 21 June 2005 (aged 66) Beirut, Lebanon
- Party: Lebanese Communist Party; Democratic Left Movement
- Occupation: Politician

George Hawi (Arabic: جورج حاوي, romanized: Jōrj Ḥāwī; born 5 November 1938 – 21 June 2005) was a Lebanese politician and former secretary general of the Lebanese Communist Party (LCP). An outspoken critic of Syrian interference in Lebanese affairs, he was killed in 2005 by a bomb placed under the passenger seat of his car. Lebanese people accused the Syrian government of assassinating him. He was the stepfather of the Lebanese-Armenian politician Rafi Madayan.

== Early life and career ==
George Hawi was born in the village of Bteghrine, Lebanon on 5 November 1938 to a Lebanese family. Although born into an Antiochian Greek Orthodox Christian family, Hawi professed to be an atheist.

He became active in student politics in his early years at university, participating in numerous strikes and demonstrations and in several popular movements. He joined the LCP in 1955 and became one of the main leaders of its Student League by the end of the decade. In 1955 he became a member of the LCP which had been illegal in Lebanon.

In 1964, he was imprisoned for his involvement in a strike against Lebanon's state-controlled tobacco manufacturer. In 1969 he was again in prison for participation in a demonstration on 23 April in support of the Palestinian cause, and again in 1970 for his part in attacking an army detachment.

Hawi was briefly expelled from the LCP in 1967 for calling for more independence from the policies of the Soviet Union. He rejoined the Party and was elected a member of its political bureau in the second and third congresses in 1968 and 1972. Hawi was elected as the general secretary of the Lebanese Communist Party after its fourth congress in 1979 – a position he kept until 1993 when he resigned. He was the fourth general secretary of the party following Fuad Shemali, Farajallah el-Helou and Nicolas Shawi. He was succeeded by Farouk Dahrouj.

During the Lebanese Civil War Hawi, who used the kunya-style nom de guerre "Abu Anis", established the Popular Guard, the LCP militia, which was aligned with the Lebanese National Movement (LNM) of Druze leader Kamal Jumblatt in its opposition to the Maronite-dominated government and Christian-backed militias.

George Hawi with the young Hanna Gharib who currently leads the party

The LCP was also active in the guerrilla warfare against Israel and its proxy militia, the South Lebanon Army (SLA), in southern Lebanon, after the Israeli invasion in 1982. During the invasion he created the Lebanese National Resistance Front together with Muhsin Ibrahim. LNRF was commanded by Elias Atallah. At later stages of the war, the LCP under Hawi allied with Syria, which had entered Lebanon in 1976, but was to stay in the country for nearly 30 years.

He became a critic of the influence of Damascus on Lebanon late in his life, after having left the LCP in 2000. In 2004, he supported the foundation of the leftist Democratic Left Movement (DLM), that was against the Syrian presence in Lebanon and participated in the Independence Uprising of 2005. Murdered journalist Samir Kassir was a prominent member and co-founder of this group.

In June 2005, Hawi claimed in an interview with Al Jazeera, that Rifaat al-Assad, brother of Hafez al-Assad and uncle of Syria's former President Bashar al-Assad, had been behind the killing of Jumblatt.

== Assassination ==
George Hawi was assassinated on 21 June 2005 when a bomb planted in his Mercedes car was detonated by remote control, as he travelled through Beirut's Wata Musaitbi neighbourhood. A nearly one-pound charge was placed under his seat, and was detonated by remote control. His driver survived, but Hawi was mortally wounded in the blast. Several sources including the March 14 Alliance and members of the Western media immediately blamed Syria for his killing and for the other explosions in the capital though a definitive culprit has yet to be found.

In August 2011, the Special Tribunal for Lebanon informed members of Hawi's family that they had found a link between his murder and that of former Lebanese Prime Minister Rafic Hariri. The link according to sources is Unit 121, the assassination squad of Hezbollah. The STL had previously issued indictments against members of Hezbollah for the Hariri killing.

== See also ==
- Lebanese Communist Party
- Democratic Left Movement
- Hanna Gharib
- Kamal Jumblatt
- Lebanese National Resistance Front
- List of assassinated Lebanese politicians
- List of extrajudicial killings and political violence in Lebanon
