= Barzanism =

Kurdish political ideology

Barzanism (Kurdish: بارزانییەت, romanized: Barzanîyet) is a political ideology associated with the Barzani tribe and the Barzani-dominated Kurdistan Democratic Party.

== Ideology ==
Barzanism comes mostly from the thoughts of Mustafa Barzani, and partially Masoud Barzani. Barzanism is a right-wing ideology, and its core principles are Kurdish nationalism, populism, republicanism, social capitalism, social justice, social conservatism, anti-communism, patriotism, and national conservatism. Despite promoting religion as a part of identity, it supports keeping the state secular. Masoud Barzani and his father Mustafa Barzani both had religious upbringings, as Mustafa Barzani was the younger brother of Abd al-Salam Barzani, and the son of Sheikh Mohammad Barzani, who were known Naqshbandi sheikhs. Masoud Barzani stated that Islam and Kurdistan "are linked", and claimed that radical Jihadists had committed a "great betrayal" against Islam, which he referred to as "a religion of tolerance, love, peace, and brotherhood". Barzanism is a Kurdish nationalist ideology centred around Kurds, although it does not discriminate against the different ethnicities and religions, as long as they are patriotic to Kurdistan. Critics of Barzanism claim it is a tribalistic ideology, but under the Barzanist KDP, the infrastructure of the Kurdistan Region was modernized, and the region attracted foreign investments, increased education, and boosted tourism. In Kurdish politics, Barzanism is the traditional rival of Apoism. The rivalry between Barzanists and Apoists had escalated into armed clashes many times across different countries. While Barzanism is more conservative, traditionalist, religious, and ethnonationalist, Apoism is more liberal, progressive, and multicultural, and their differences were likened to that of the Republicans and Democrats in the United States, or the Erdoğanists and Kemalists in Turkey.
