= Lebanese Communist Party =

Political party in Lebanon

Lebanese Communist Party الحزب الشيوعي اللبناني
- Abbreviation: LCP (English)
- Leader: Hanna Gharib
- Founded: 1964 (as independent entity)
- Preceded by: Syrian–Lebanese Communist Party
- Headquarters: Beirut
- Newspaper: Al-Nidaa
- Youth wing: Union of Lebanese Democratic Youth
- Military wing: Popular Guard (1970–1990; 2006)
- Ideology: Communism; Marxism–Leninism; Nonsectarianism; Anti-Zionism
- Political position: Left-wing to far-left
- National affiliation: LNM (1969–1982); LNRF (1982–1999)
- International affiliation: IMCWP; World Anti-Imperialist Platform
- Parliament of Lebanon: 0 / 128

Party flag

Website
- www.lcparty.org

The Lebanese Communist Party (LCP; Arabic: الحزب الشيوعي اللبناني, transliterated: al-Ḥizb al-šuyūʿī al-lubnānī) is a Marxist-Leninist party in Lebanon. It was founded in 1943 as a division of the Syrian–Lebanese Communist Party into the Syrian Communist Party and the Lebanese Communist Party, but the division was only implemented in 1964.

== History ==
=== Creation ===
The Syrian–Lebanese Communist Party was a Communist party operating in Syria and Lebanon, founded in 1924 by the Lebanese-Egyptian Fu'ad al-Shamali, the Lebanese Yusuf Yazbek and the Armenian Artin Madoyan. It was the second Communist party to be formed in the Levant, after the Communist Party of Palestine.

In Lebanon, the party initially used the name Lebanese People's Party, in an attempt to evade the ban on "Bolshevik" activities. The party was declared illegal by the Mandatory authority at first, but the ban was relaxed under the French Front Populaire government, and again in 1941. The party took a new option of collaboration with the nationalist movement and playing down its socialist themes in 1936, in accordance with the 7th World Congress of the Comintern in 1935.

The joint Syrian-Lebanese party was divided into the Syrian Communist Party and the Lebanese Communist Party, but the decision, taken at the end of 1943, was only implemented in 1964. In between, common central committee and political bureau were maintained.

=== Post-independence activities ===
In 1943, the party participated in the legislative elections, but failed to win any seats in the Chamber of Deputies. The LCP ran for election again in 1947, but all of its candidates were defeated and the party was outlawed in 1948. During the 1950s, the party's inconsistent policies on Pan-Arabism and the Nasserite movement cost it support. The party was active against the government during the 1958 uprising. In 1965, the LCP decided to end its isolation and became a member of the Front for Progressive Parties and National Forces, which later evolved into the Lebanese National Movement (LNM) under Druze leftist leader Kamal Jumblatt. In the mid-1960s, the U.S. State Department estimated the party membership to be approximately 3,000.

The 1970s witnessed something of a resurgence of the LCP. In 1970, Kamal Jumblatt, as Minister of the Interior, legalized the party. This allowed many LCP leaders, including Secretary General Nicolas Shawi, to run for election in 1972. Although they polled several thousand votes, none of them succeeded in gaining a seat.

=== During the Lebanese Civil War ===
During the early 1970s, the LCP established a well-trained militia, the Popular Guard, of some 5,000 armed men which participated actively in the fighting at the start of the Lebanese Civil War. The LCP was a member of the predominantly leftist and Muslim Lebanese National Movement which was allied with the PLO, even though its leaders and a significant part of its members were Christian (particularly Greek Orthodox and Armenian). In 1975, the party had around 40,000 members (excluding supporters). Their confessional identity was roughly divided into: 50% Shia Muslims, 30% Christians and the remaining 20% Sunnis and Druze.

Throughout the 1980s, the LCP generally declined in influence. In 1983, the Tripoli-based Sunni Islamic movement, Islamic Unification Movement (Tawhid), reportedly executed fifty Communists. In 1987, together with the Druze Progressive Socialist Party, the LCP fought a week-long battle against the Shi'a militants of the Amal in West Beirut, a conflict that was stopped by Syrian troops.

Also in 1987, the LCP held its Fifth Party Congress and was about to oust George Hawi, its Greek Orthodox leader, in favor of Karim Mroue, a Shi'a, as secretary general. However, Hawi remained in his post. Hawi, who had been a rising opponent of the party's complete dependence on the Soviet Union, was reportedly unpopular for his idealism and unwillingness to compromise his ideology. Mroue was probably the most powerful member of the LCP and was on good terms with Shi'a groups in West Beirut. Nevertheless, between 1984 and 1987 many party leaders and members were assassinated, reportedly by Islamic fundamentalists.

=== After the Lebanese Civil War ===
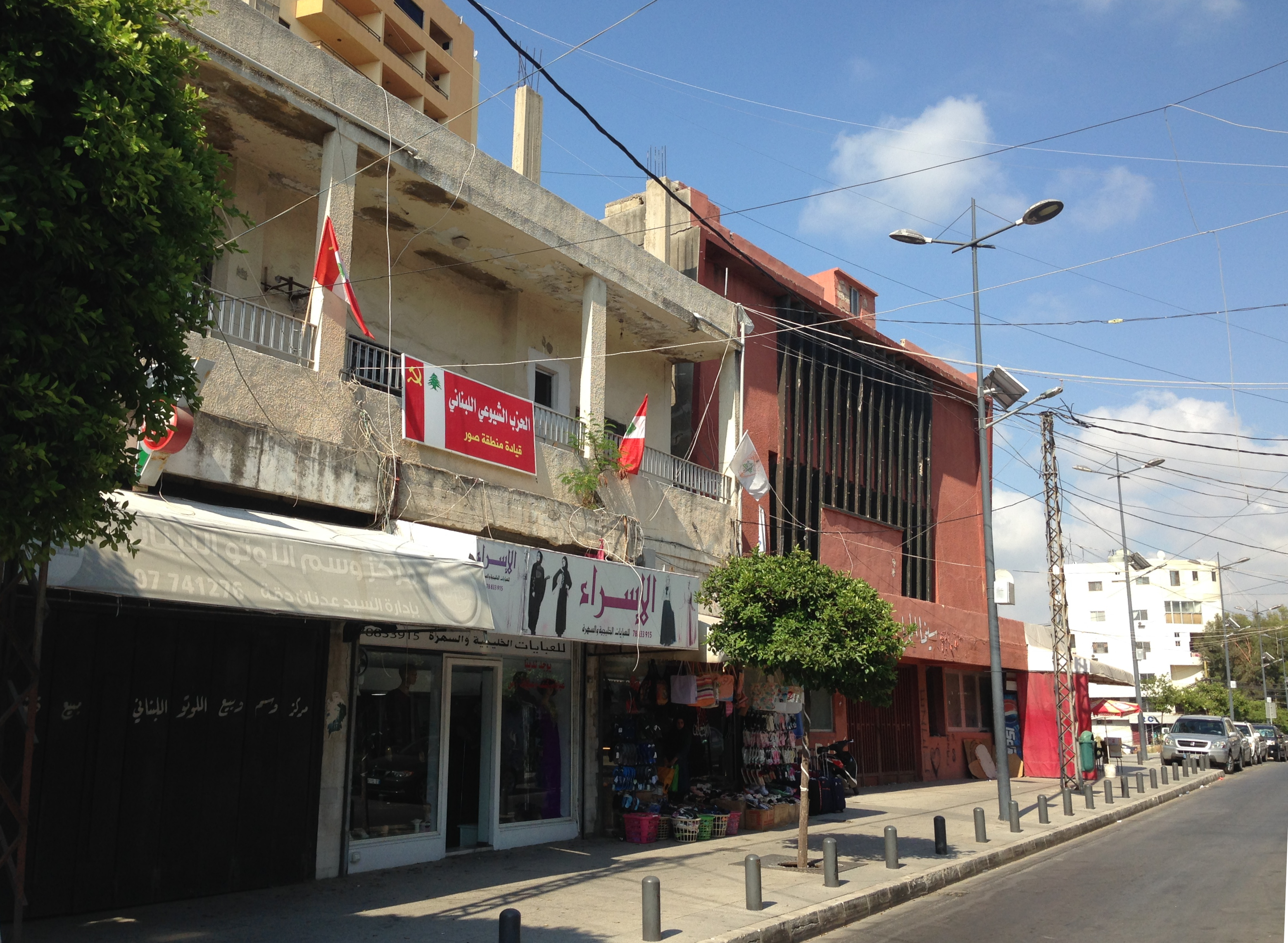
Communist Party office in Tyre, South Lebanon

The end of the Lebanese Civil War coincided with the collapse of the Soviet Union. Two back-to-back congresses saw the exit of Hawi, Mroue and other prominent leaders of the party, which left it in a major crisis. The congresses witnessed the election of Farouq Dahrouj as the new secretary-general of the party. Hawi returned to the party as head of its national council (formerly the central committee), but later abdicated in the 1998 8th congress, which saw the second election of Dahrouj as secretary general. As of 2000, the party leader was Elias Atallah. Khaled Hadadi was elected in the 9th Congress in December 2003 as the head of the party. Saadallah Mazraani, who was vice general secretary under Dahrouj, remained in the same position under Hadadi.

On 21 June 2005, George Hawi, a former secretary general of the LCP, was killed by the explosion of a car in Beirut. Hawi, a critic of Syria, claimed a few days before his death that Rifaat al-Assad, uncle of Bashar al-Assad, Syria's president, had masterminded the 1977 assassination of Lebanese opposition leader Kamal Jumblatt. Allies of Hawi accused pro-Syrian forces in the Lebanese-security apparatus for the assassination. Émile Lahoud, then president of Lebanon, and the Syrian government denied this allegation. The assassination occurred two days after Lebanon's 2005 elections. and less than one month after Samir Kassir, a left-wing Lebanese journalist and political figure, was assassinated in another car blast.

As of 2016, the party was led by Hanna Gharib.

== Electoral results ==
The party participated in the 2005 parliamentary elections in several regions but did not win any seats. In Southern Lebanon, vice general secretary Saadallah Mazraani won 8,886 votes in the second district, and Anwar Yassin, a former detainee in Israel, received 18,244 votes in the first district. Former general secretary Farouq Dahrouj obtained 10,688 votes in the Bekaa third district.

In the 2009 legislative elections, the LCP ran independently with candidates in five districts but failed to win any seats. In a formal statement, the LCP commented that "the 2009 elections widened the gap already existing because of the sectarian system," and, while expressing dismay at its electoral showing, analyzed and attempted to justify the party's performance.

=== Legislative elections ===
House of Representatives
Election year	# of overall votes	% of overall vote	# of overall seats won	+/–	Leader
2018	8,604 (#24)	0.47	0 / 128		Hanna Gharib
2022	19,316 (#24) (Note: Includes votes for independent candidates allied with the party, including elected MP Elias Jaradeh, who was elected.)	1.07%	0 / 128		Hanna Gharib

== Political structure ==
The Lebanese Communist Party is one of the few Lebanese parties that have affiliations throughout different sects and regions. It is present in most Lebanese districts, but its strength is greatest in South Lebanon. This structure gives the party a national presence, but at the same time weakens its representation in the local and central governmental bodies including municipalities and parliament. The party, as other traditional communist parties, operates through several popular organizations to recruit and spread its political message. These organizations include the Union of Lebanese Democratic Youth (youth organization), the Committee of Woman's Rights (Women's organization), the Popular Aid (Health organization) and the General Union of Workers and Employees in Lebanon (labor union).

== See also ==
- Al-Mourabitoun
- Lebanese Civil War
- List of extrajudicial killings and political violence in Lebanon
- Lebanese National Movement
- Lebanese National Resistance Front
- Progressive Socialist Party
- Farajallah el-Helou
- Ziad Rahbani
