= Syrian–Lebanese Communist Party =

Syrian–Lebanese Communist Party الحزب الشيوعي السوري اللبناني Parti communiste de la Syrie et du Liban
- Leader: Khalid Bakdash
- Founded: 24 October 1924
- Dissolved: 1964
- Succeeded by: SCP; LCP
- Ideology: Communism; Marxism–Leninism
- Political position: Left-wing to far-left
- International affiliation: Comintern
- Colours: Red and Yellow

The Syrian–Lebanese Communist Party (Arabic: الحزب الشيوعي السوري اللبناني, Al-Ḥizb al-shuyū'ī al-sūrī al-lubnānī; French: Parti communiste de la Syrie et du Liban) was a Marxist-Leninist party, operating in Syria and Lebanon, and founded in 1924 by the Lebanese Egyptian Fu'ad al-Shimali, the Lebanese Yusuf Yazbek and the Armenian Artin Madoyan. Its general secretary was Khalid Bakdash. It was the second communist party to be formed in the Levant, after the Communist Party of Palestine, but it was the first to be largely Arab, as the Palestinian party initially drew largely from the Jewish community.

In its earliest years, the party supported the Syrian Revolt of 1925, but was quickly repressed by the forces of General Maurice Sarrail. Their newspapers were closed down and party leaders remained imprisoned until an amnesty law secured their release in 1928.They supported the rebel force led by Sultan al-Atrash. The party was represented at the 6th Congress of the Communist International in 1928 by Fu'ad al-Shimali. It was also in 1928 that the party, despite operating in what is now both Syria and Lebanon, adopted the name "Communist Party of Syria (Al-Ḥizb al-shuyū'ī al-sūrī), reflecting its commitment to Syrian unity and rejection of the division of the historic region under colonial mandates. However, it later reverted to its original name.

Under the French Mandate, it was an underground organization, then legalized in 1936–1939 by the French Front Populaire government, and again in 1941. The party took a new option of collaboration with the nationalist movement and playing down its socialist themes in 1936, in accordance with the 7th World Congress of the Comintern in 1935.

Later, the party was divided into the Syrian Communist Party and the Lebanese Communist Party, but the decision, taken at the end of 1943, was only implemented in 1964. In between, common central committee and political bureau were maintained.

== Sources ==
- Ismael, Tareq Y.; Ismael, Jacqueline S. (1998). The Communist Movement in Syria & Lebanon. Gainesville: University Press of Florida. ISBN 0813016312.
