= Fuad Shemali =

Syrian politician

Fuad Shemali (in Arabic فؤاد الشمالي) alternatively Fouad El Chemali (in Arabic فؤاد الشمالي) was born in 1936 to a Lebanese Christian-Maronite family. He studied law at the University of St. Joseph in Beirut. He adhered to the Syrian Social Nationalist Party (SSNP) in 1951, joined Fatah in the 1960s. He died from cancer in Geneva in August 1972.

== References and notes ==
- Ilich Ramirez Sanchez, dit "Carlos": Comment et pourquoi j’ai pris en otage les ministres de l’OPEP (in French)
- Article about events involving Shemali
