= Civil Administration of the Mountain =

Former geopolitical region in Lebanon

Civil Administration of the Mountain الادارة المدنية في الجبل (Arabic) El 3Idareh El Madenieh fi El Jebel
- 1983–1991
- Flag of the Progressive Socialist Party

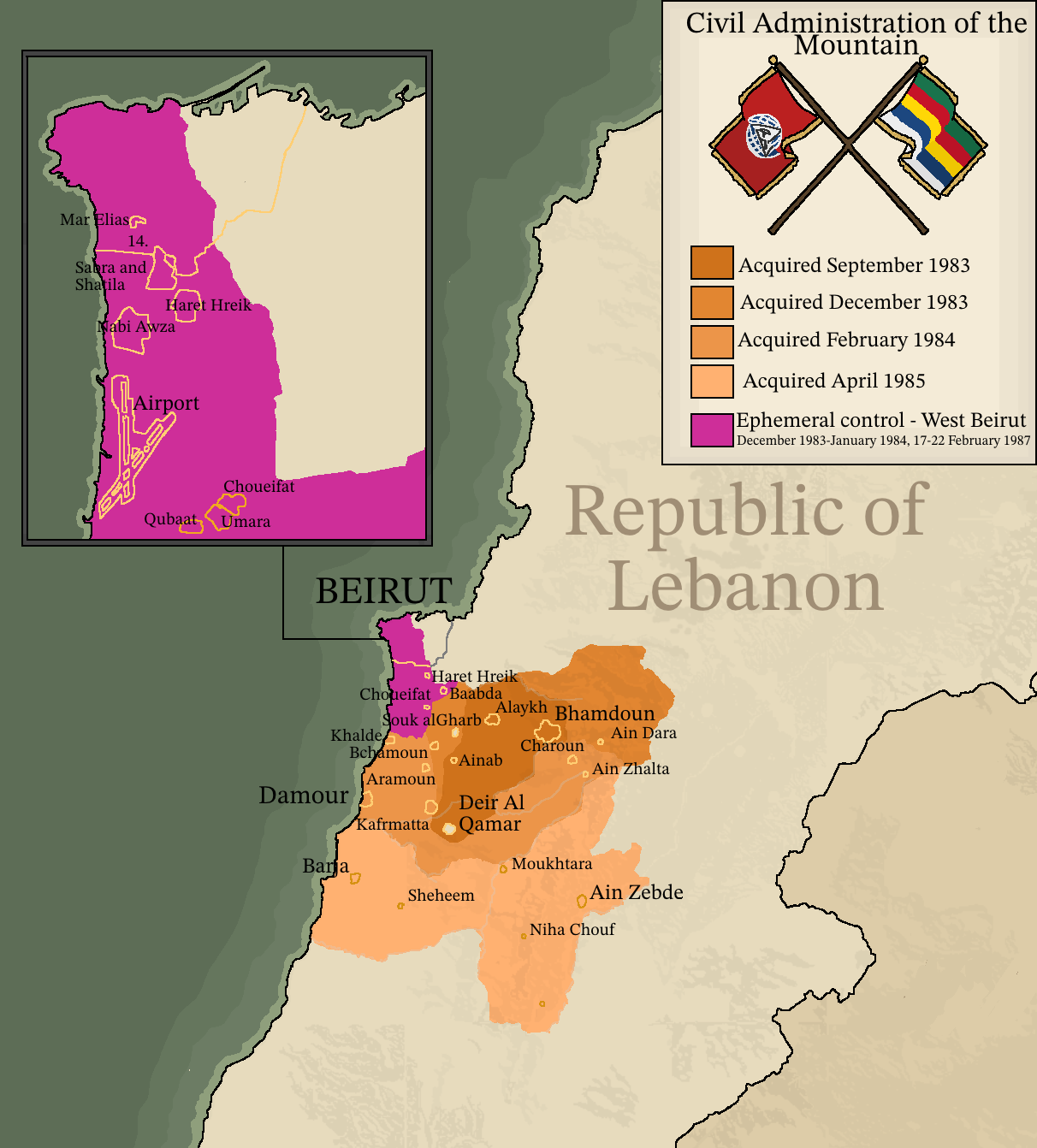
- Status: Militia-controlled territory
- Common languages: Arabic
- Religion: Druzism

Government
  - Beyk: Walid Jumblatt
- Historical era: Lebanese Civil War
  - Established: 1983
  - Disestablished: 1991
- Currency: Lebanese Pound
Preceded by	Succeeded by
Israeli occupation of Southern Lebanon (1982–2000)	Lebanon
- Today part of: Lebanon

The Civil Administration of the Mountain, sometimes referred to as Jabal al-Druze (not to be confused with similarly termed region in Syria), was Walid Jumblatt’s Druze-dominated polity that existed in Lebanon from 1983 until its gradual erosion following the Taif Agreement and the end of the country's civil war. It was one of the wartime state-like territories (known as cantons) which was controlled by the PSP’s armed wing, the People's Liberation Army (PLA). The PLA controlled most of the Chouf district and some parts of Aley and Baabda. It bordered the East Beirut canton to the north, which was controlled by a rival Christian militia, the Lebanese Forces.

== Voice of the Mountain ==
Although its beginning was in 1983, the broadcasting of the Voice of the Mountain officially began operations on 1 February 1984. It operated from the Chouf Mountains. Ghazi Aridi worked as the director of the station until 1994 when it was closed.
