= Endless Night =

Endless Night(s) may refer to:

== Music ==
- Endless Nights (album), a 2007 album by Marcos Hernandez
- "Endless Night" (Graham Parker song), 1980
- "Endless Night" (The Lion King song), 1997
- "Endless Night", a song by Shobaleader One featuring Squarepusher from the 2010 album Shobaleader One: d'Demonstrator
- "Endless Nights" (song), a 1986 song by Eddie Money
- "Endless Nights", a 2017 song by Trivium

== Other uses ==
- The Endless Night, a 1963 West German film
- Endless Night (novel), a 1967 novel by Agatha Christie
  - Endless Night (1972 film), a British film adaptation
- Endless Night (painting), a 1983 painting by Nabil Kanso
- The Sandman: Endless Nights, a 2003 graphic novel by Neil Gaiman
- Endless Night (2015 film), a Spanish film
