= Voice of the Mountain =

The Voice of the Mountain (Arabic: صوت الجبل, Sawt al-Jabal) was a radio station operated by the Progressive Socialist Party during the Lebanese Civil War.

== History and profile ==
Although its beginning was in 1983, the broadcasting of the Voice of the Mountain officially started on 1 February 1984. It operated from the Chouf Mountains. Ghazi Aridi worked as the director of the station until 1994 when it was closed.
