= Lebanon Summer 1982 =

1982 painting by Nabil Kanso

- Artist: Nabil Kanso
- Year: 1982
- Subject: Sabra and Shatila massacre

Lebanon Summer 1982 is the title and subject of a mural-scale painting made by Nabil Kanso in 1982 on the Sabra and Shatila massacre during the Lebanese Civil War. It is oil on canvas measuring 3 by 5.5 meters (9.8 ft × 18.0 ft)

== See also ==
- Lebanon painting
- Endless Night
- 1982 in art
