= Battle of Sidon (1991) =

Battle between the PLO and Lebanon

- Part of the Lebanese Civil War
- Battle of Sidon (1991) (Lebanon)
Date	2–6 July 1991
Location	Sidon, Lebanon 33°33′38″N 35°23′53″E
Result	Lebanese Government victory

Belligerents
(Lebanon) Lebanese Government	Palestine Liberation Organization (surrendered): Popular Front for the Liberation of Palestine; Democratic Front for the Liberation of Palestine

Commanders and leaders
Elias Hrawi	unknown

Strength
(Lebanon) 6,000 troops (Lebanon) 135 tanks	Unknown

Casualties and losses
- 80 killed

The Battle of Sidon was fought between the Palestine Liberation Organization (PLO) and the Lebanese Government from 2 to 6 July 1991, and was the final battle of the Lebanese Civil War. The causes of the battle laid in the PLO's refusal to accept the Taif Agreement, which required the PLO to disarm. The government's deadline for PLO withdrawal from Sidon was on 1 July 1991.

After four days of fighting, the PLO capitulated, marking the end of hostilities in the Lebanese Civil War. The Lebanese Government hoped that defeating the PLO would convince Israel to end its occupation of Southern Lebanon, which the Israeli government justified by its need for a buffer against PLO incursions. The Israeli complete withdrawal to the internationally recognized border took place on 24 May 2000.
