= Ghazi Aridi =

Lebanese politician (born 1954)

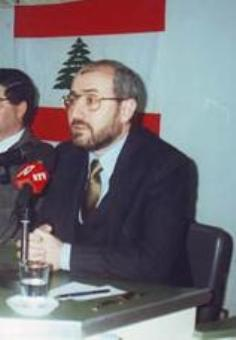

Minister of Public Works and Transportation
- In office 13 June 2011 – December 2013
- Prime Minister: Najib Mikati
- Preceded by: Himself
- In office 2009 – 13 June 2011
- Prime Minister: Saad Hariri
- Succeeded by: Himself

Minister of Culture
- In office 17 April 2003 – 7 September 2004
- Prime Minister: Rafik Hariri

Minister of Information
- In office October 2001 – April 2003
- Prime Minister: Rafik Hariri

Personal details
- Born: Ghazi Hani Aridi; 17 October 1954 (age 71) Baisour, Lebanon
- Party: Progressive Socialist Party
- Education: Lebanese University
- Website: Official website

Ghazi Aridi (born 17 October 1954) is a Lebanese politician who has held various cabinet portfolios. He was the minister of public works and transportation from 13 June 2011 to December 2013.

== Early life ==
Aridi was born into a Druze family in Baisour on 17 September 1954. Aridi studied physics at Lebanese University.

== Career ==
Aridi is a physics teacher by education and worked in a high school in Aley before dealing with politics. In 1972, he joined the Progressive Socialist Party (PSP) headed by Walid Jumblatt. In 1980, he began to serve as a special envoy of the Lebanese National Movement (LNM). He became assistant secretary of the PSP in 1983. He was sent to Algeria where he remained during the Israeli invasion of Lebanon. In 1991, Aridi began to serve as political advisor of Walid Jumblatt. He returned to Lebanon in 1983 and launched a radio station, the Sawt al Jabal (Voice of the Mountain) that was the broadcast radio station of the PSP. He worked as its director until 1994 when it was closed.

Aridi won the Druze seat of Beirut's third district that was once held by Akram Chehayeb, becoming a member of parliament in 2000. He was part of the Hariri's electoral list, called Beirut Al Karama (Beirut Dignity).

Aridi was first appointed minister of information to the cabinet led by Prime Minister Rafik Hariri in October 2000. Aridi served in the post until April 2003. Then he served as the minister of culture in Hariri’s fifth cabinet from 17 April 2003 to 7 September 2004.

Aridi, together with three other cabinet ministers, namely then economy minister Marwan Hamadeh, environment minister Farès Boueiz and refugee affairs minister Abdullah Farhat, resigned from office on 7 September in protest of constitutional amendment that extended the term of then president Emile Lahoud. They were among the members of the Lebanese parliament, who voted against the extension of Lahoud's term. The State Minister Karam Karam replaced Aridi as acting culture minister. In the general elections of 2005, Aridi ran for office on Jumblatt's list and won a seat from the third district of Beirut.

Later Aridi served as the minister of information in Fouad Siniora's cabinet until 2008. Next, he was appointed minister of public works and transportation to the cabinet of Prime Minister Fouad Siniora in July 2008.

Aridi won a seat from the third district of Beirut in the 2009 general election as part of the 14 March alliance list. He continued to serve as minister of public works and transportation in the Saad Hariri cabinet from 2009 to 2011. In the cabinet, he was a member of democratic gathering and majority alliance.

Aridi was again appointed to the same post on 13 June 2011 in the Najib Mikati's cabinet. As a member of the Progressive Socialist Party, he was one of the three ministers appointed the party's leader Walid Jumblatt in the cabinet. In other words, Aridi was part of the National Struggle Front in the cabinet. He resigned from the post in December 2013.

=== Alliances and views ===
Aridi is one of the most significant aides of Walid Jumblatt. In addition, he has been political advisor of Jumblatt since 1991. Aridi stated that he is a friend of Hassan Nasrallah and that he respects both him and Hezbollah.

=== Publications ===
Aridi published two books: Words in Difficult Times (1992), a collection of his speeches and political comments given to radio Voice of the Mountain and Lebanon: A Big Price for a Small Role (1999), a political analysis of the situation in Lebanon and the Middle East.

== Personal life ==
Aridi is married to Yussra Salman and has a daughter and a son.
