= Lebanese Civil War =

1975–1990 conflict in Lebanon

- Part of the Cold War and Arab Cold War; Arab–Israeli (Israeli–Lebanese, Israeli–Palestinian, and Israeli–Syrian) conflicts Iran–Israel, Iran–Saudi, Iran–Iraq and Iraq–Syria proxy wars
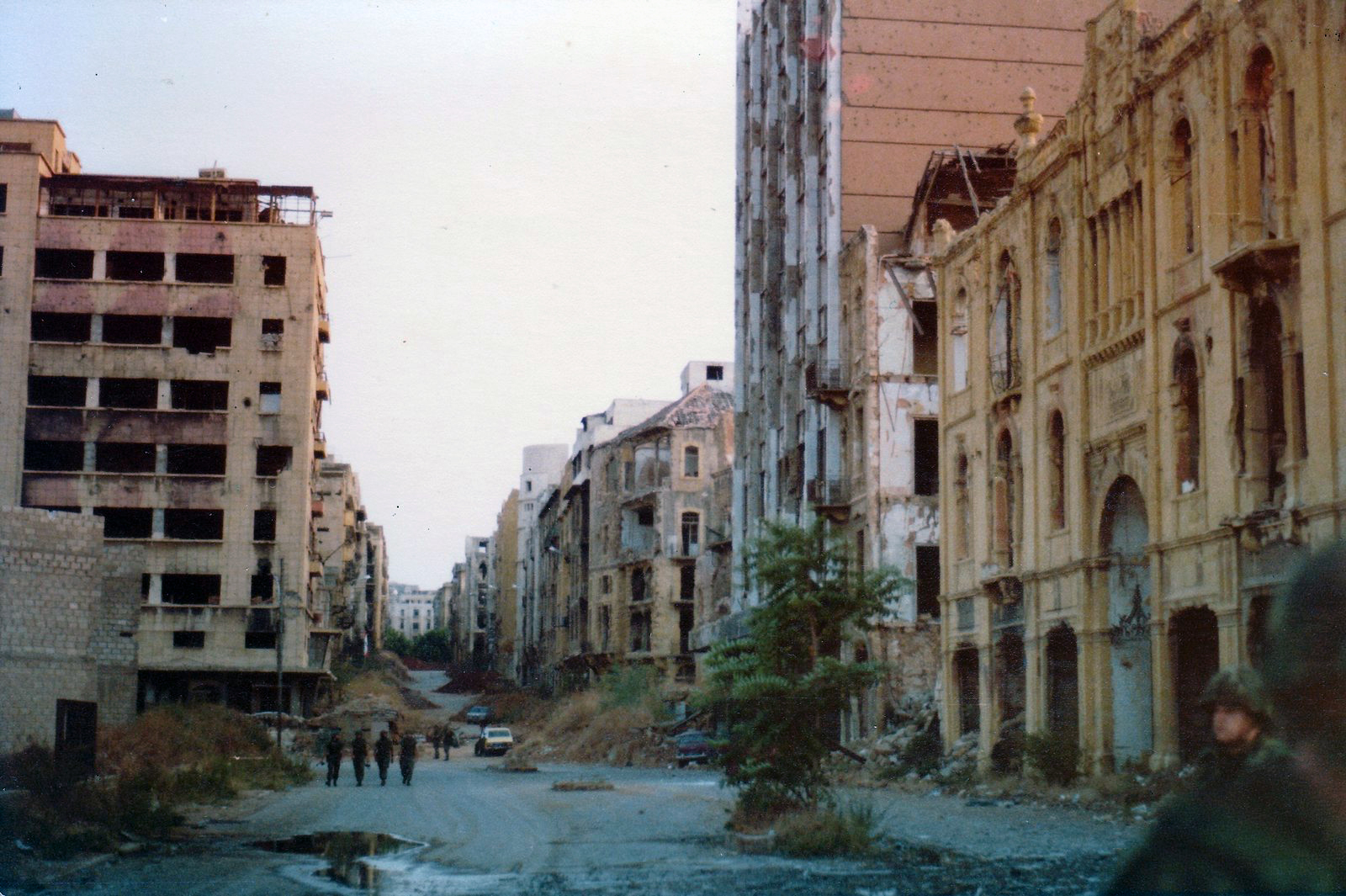
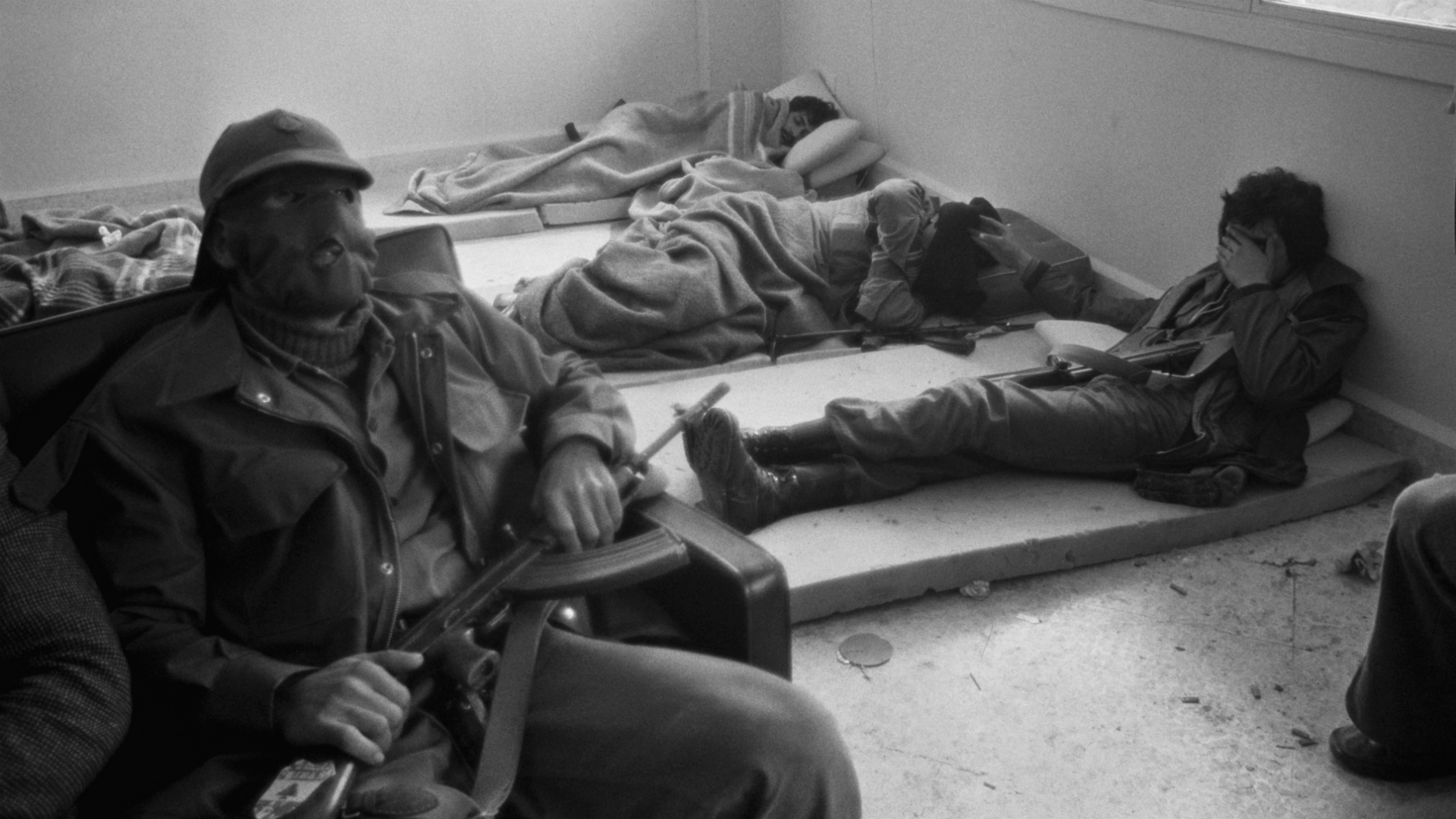
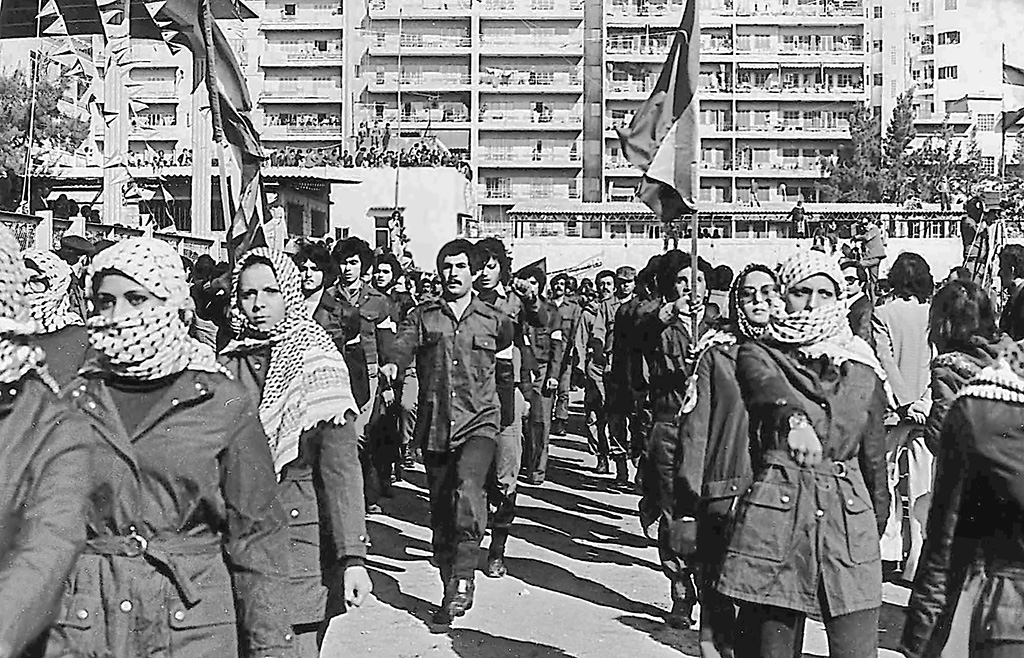
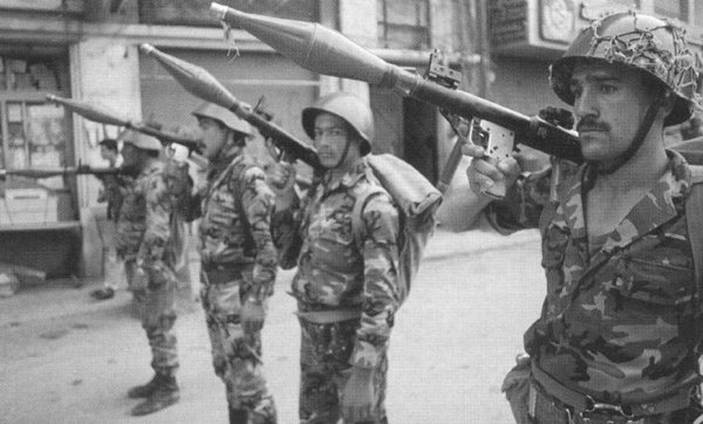
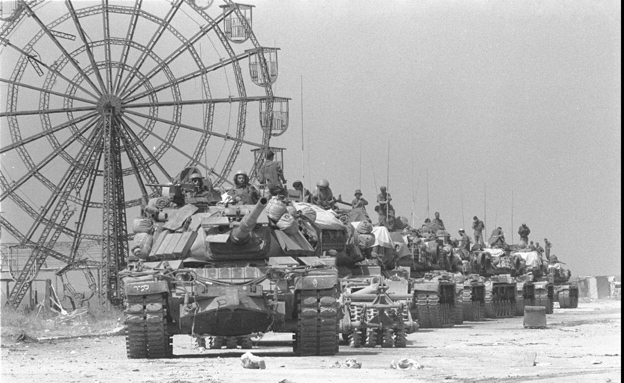
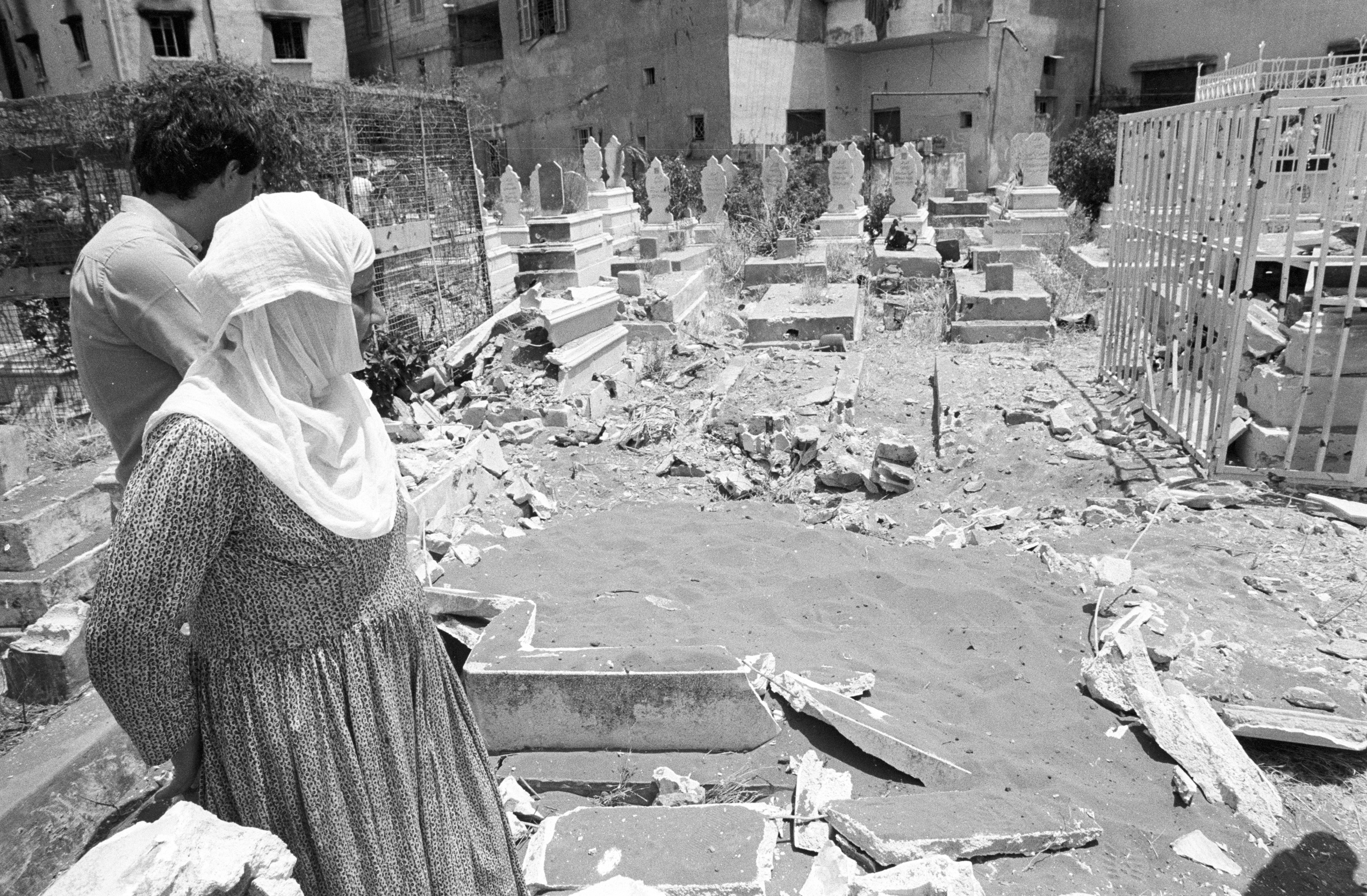
- From top to bottom, left to right: The Green Line dividing Beirut; Kataeb militia fighters; Palestinian Fatah fighters in Beirut; Syrian troops deployed in Lebanon; Israeli forces during the 1982 invasion; destroyed cemetery in Beirut.
Date	13 April 1975 – 13 October 1990 (Note: The last battle took place from 2–6 July 1991 between the Lebanese government and the Palestine Liberation Organization due to the latter's refusal to accept the Taif Agreement.) (15 years and 6 months)
Location	Lebanon
Result	Taif Agreement; Christian-to-Muslim representation in Parliament of Lebanon adjusted from ratio of 55:45 to 50:50 and increasing the number of seats from 99 to 108 – and eventually to 128; Political powers of Muslim-reserved position of Prime Minister strengthened over Christian-reserved position of President; Disarmament of all Lebanese and non-Lebanese militias, excluding Iran-backed Hezbollah; Continued hostilities between Lebanon and the Palestine Liberation Organization (PLO), and PLO expulsion to Tunis, Tunisia in 1982.; Expulsion of Palestinian militias from Lebanon after the Battle of Sidon in 1991; Collapse of the Israel-backed State of Free Lebanon in 1984 and of Israel's South Lebanon security belt administration in 2000; Continued fighting between Israel and Hezbollah in the Shebaa Farms conflict, eventually leading to the 2006 Lebanon War; Dominance of Hezbollah's military wing across Lebanon since 1990
Territorial changes	Creation of various short-lived cantons during the war, including the Civil Administration of the Mountain and the East Beirut canton; Syria occupies northern/eastern Lebanon until 30 April 2005; Israel occupies southern Lebanon until 25 May 2000

Belligerents
Lebanese Front (1976–1990); Members: Kataeb Party; National Liberal Party (NLP) (until 1980); Lebanese Forces (LF); Marada Brigade (until 1978); Guardians of the Cedars (GoC); Al-Tanzim; Lebanese Youth Movement (MKG) (until 1977); Tyous Team of Commandos (TTC) (until 1985); Zahliote Group (ZG) (until 1978); Shuraya Party; Vanguard of the Maani Army (MDJ) (until 1978); Other minor organizations; Army of Free Lebanon (AFL) (1976–1978); South Lebanon Army (SLA) (1977–1990); Israel (1978–1990)	Lebanese National Resistance Front (1982–1990); Members: Al-Mourabitoun (INM); Progressive Socialist Party (PSP); Lebanese Communist Party (LCP); Syrian Social Nationalist Party in Lebanon (SSNP-L); Communist Action Organization in Lebanon (OCAL); Lebanese Movement in Support of Fatah (LMSF); Arab Socialist Ba'ath Party – Lebanon Region; Revolutionary Communist Group (RCG); Sixth of February Movement (6th FM) (until 1986); Socialist Arab Lebanon Vanguard Party (SALVP); Popular Nasserist Organization (PNO); Toilers League (WL); Lebanese Arab Army (LAA) (until 1977); Other minor organizations; Lebanese National Movement (1975–1982); PLO (1975–1991); ASALA (1975–1991) Hezbollah (1982–1990); Iran (1982–1990) (Note: Mainly IRGC and Army paramilitary units, as a part of the Lebanon Corps.) Islamic Unification Movement (1982–1990)	Syria (1976, 1982–1991); Amal Movement; Palestinian National Salvation Front (PNSF); Marada Brigade (from 1978); Lebanese Forces – Executive Command (LFEC)	Lebanese Armed Forces (1975–1991) United Nations Interim Force in Lebanon (1978–1990); Multinational Force in Lebanon (1982–1984) List: United States; United Kingdom; France; Italy; Arab Deterrent Force (1976–1982) (Note: Although nominally present at the behest of the government of Lebanon, the force was under the direct command of Syria.) List: Syria (1976–1982) (Note: Only ostensibly acting as part of the military coalition while largely operating in the interests of their own independent foreign policy separate from other Arab League coalition forces stationed in Lebanon.); Saudi Arabia (1976–1979); Sudan (1976–1979); UAE (1976–1979); Libya (1976 only); South Yemen (1976–1977)

Commanders and leaders
Bachir Gemayel †; Amine Gemayel; William Hawi †; Dany Chamoun †; Elie Hobeika (until 1986); Samir Geagea; Etienne Saqr; Georges Adwan; Saad Haddad # Antoine Lahad; Menachem Begin; Ariel Sharon; Rafael Eitan; Avigdor Ben-Gal	Kamal Jumblatt †; Walid Jumblatt; Inaam Raad; Abdallah Saadeh; Assem Qanso; George Hawi; Elias Atallah; Muhsin Ibrahim; Ibrahim Kulaylat; Ali Eid; Yasser Arafat; George Habash; Nayef Hawatmeh; Hagop Hagopian; Monte Melkonian (Hezbollah) Subhi al-Tufayli (Hezbollah) Abbas al-Musawi Said Shaaban	Hafez al-Assad; Mustafa Tlass; Hikmat al-Shihabi; Ali Aslan; Nabih Berri; Tony Frangieh †; Robert Frangieh; Elie Hobeika (from 1986)	Michel Aoun Emmanuel Erskine; William O'Callaghan; Gustav Hägglund; Timothy J. Geraghty

Strength
Unknown	Unknown	25,000 troops (1976)	1,200 troops 1,000 troops 1,000 troops 700 troops 700 troops
- 120,000–150,000 people killed

The Lebanese Civil War (Arabic: الحرب الأهلية اللبنانية, al-ḥarb al-ahliyyah al-libnāniyyah) was a multifaceted armed conflict fought in Lebanon from 1975 to 1990. It resulted in an estimated 120,000 deaths, displaced nearly one million people, and caused widespread destruction across the country.

The war arose from longstanding political and sectarian tensions within Lebanon's confessional system, compounded by demographic change, the presence of Palestinian armed groups following the Arab–Israeli conflict, and the influence of regional rivalries and the Cold War. Fighting initially broke out between Christian militias and Palestinian factions, principally the Palestine Liberation Organization (PLO), allied with Lebanese Muslim, leftist, and pan-Arab groups. As the conflict escalated, it developed into a complex, multi-sided war involving shifting alliances among Lebanese factions and the military intervention of Syria, Israel, Iran, and other foreign actors.

Throughout the conflict, numerous militias fought for political, sectarian, and territorial objectives, with alliances frequently changing over time. While much of the fighting occurred between opposing sectarian and ideological coalitions, significant violence also took place within individual communities. International peacekeeping forces, including the Multinational Force in Lebanon and the United Nations Interim Force in Lebanon (UNIFIL), were deployed during different stages of the war.

The 1989 Taif Agreement laid the foundation for ending the conflict, and most militias were disbanded following the war's conclusion in 1990. In 1991, the Lebanese Parliament enacted a general amnesty for political crimes committed during the conflict. Hezbollah, however, remained armed, citing its role in resisting the Israeli occupation of southern Lebanon. The war left a lasting impact on Lebanon's political system, economy, and society, and many of its underlying political and sectarian divisions have continued to shape the country in the decades since its end.

== Background ==
=== Ottoman and European rule ===
In 1860, a civil war between Druze and Maronites erupted in the Ottoman Mutasarrifate of Mount Lebanon. The war resulted in the massacre of about 10,000 Christians and at least 6,000 Druzes.

During World War I, most Arabs fought in the Ottoman army against the British and French invaders.

With the dissolution of the Ottoman Empire, the French took control of the area under the French Mandate for Syria and the Lebanon. The French created the state of Greater Lebanon as a safe haven for the Maronites, but expanded it beyond the historical Ottoman borders, including a large Muslim population.

In 1926, Lebanon was declared a republic and a constitution was adopted, which France would suspend in 1932 and 1939. Sunni Muslim factions refused to recognize Lebanon's separation from Syria until its claim on Lebanon was abandoned in 1936. In parallel, Maronite Christian leaders sought a more equal partnership with French authorities and a move towards self-governance, although both communities were divided in their interests. In 1936, the Maronite Phalange party was founded by Pierre Gemayel.

=== Lebanese independence ===
World War II and the 1940s brought great change to Lebanon and the Middle East. Lebanon was promised independence, which was achieved on 22 November 1943. Free French troops, who had invaded Lebanon in 1941 to rid Beirut of the Vichy French forces, left Lebanon in 1946. The Maronites assumed power over Lebanon and its economy. A parliament was created in which both Muslims and Christians each had a set quota of seats. Accordingly, the President was to be a Maronite, the Prime Minister a Sunni Muslim and the Speaker of Parliament a Shia Muslim.

In 1947, the United Nations Partition Plan for Palestine led to civil war in Palestine, the end of Mandatory Palestine, and the Israeli Declaration of Independence on 14 May 1948. The ongoing civil war was transformed into a state conflict between Israel and the Arab states in the 1948 Arab–Israeli War. This led to Palestinian refugees crossing the border into Lebanon.

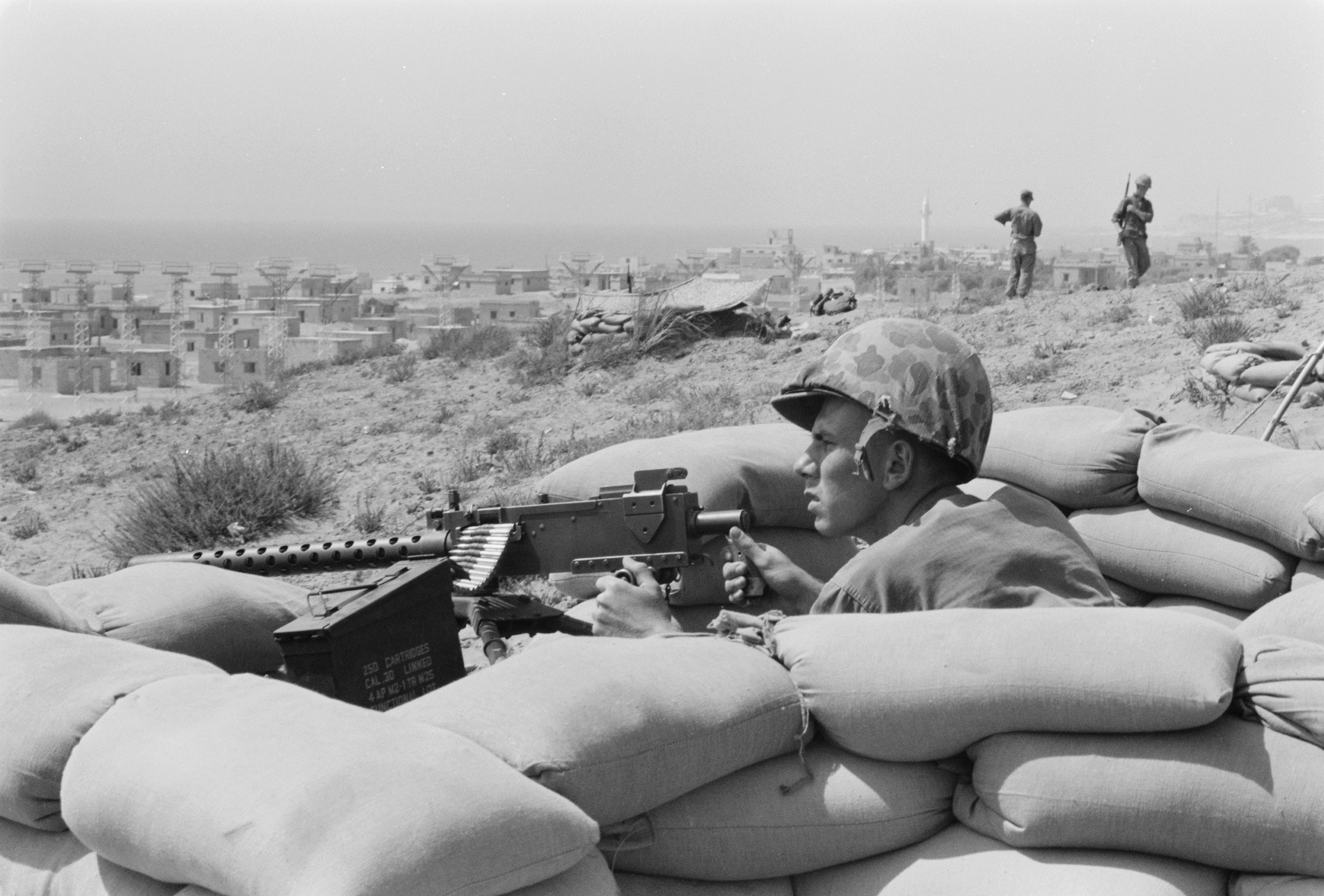
U.S. Marine sits in a foxhole outside Beirut during the 1958 Lebanon crisis.

In July 1958, Lebanon was threatened by a civil war between Maronite Christians and Muslims. President Camille Chamoun had attempted to break the stranglehold on Lebanese politics exercised by traditional political families in Lebanon. These families maintained their electoral appeal by cultivating strong client–patron relations with their local communities. Although he succeeded in sponsoring alternative political candidates to enter the elections in 1957, causing the traditional families to lose their positions, these families then embarked upon a war with Chamoun, referred to as the War of the Pashas.

In 1956, tensions with Egypt escalated when the non-aligned President, Camille Chamoun, did not break off diplomatic relations with the Western powers that attacked Egypt during the Suez Crisis, angering Egyptian President Gamal Abdel Nasser. This was during the Cold War and Chamoun has often been called pro-Western, though he had signed several trade deals with the Soviet Union (see Gendzier). Nasser had attacked Chamoun because of his suspected support for the U.S. led Baghdad Pact. Nasser felt that the pro-western Baghdad Pact posed a threat to Arab nationalism.

President Chamoun looked to regional pacts to ensure protection from foreign armies: Lebanon historically had a small cosmetic army that was never effective in defending Lebanon's territorial integrity, and this is why in later years the PLO guerrilla factions had found it easy to enter Lebanon and set up bases, as well as take over army barracks on the border with Israel as early as 1968. Early skirmishes saw the army lose control over its barracks to the PLO and lose many soldiers. Even prior to this, president Chamoun was aware of the country's vulnerability to outside forces.

His Lebanese pan-Arabist Sunni Muslim Prime Minister Rashid Karami supported Nasser in 1956 and 1958. Lebanese Muslims pushed the government to join the newly created United Arab Republic, a country formed out of the unification of Syria and Egypt, while the majority of Lebanese and especially the Maronites wanted to keep Lebanon as an independent nation with its own independent parliament. President Camille Chamoun feared the toppling of his government and asked for U.S. intervention. At the time the United States was engaged in the Cold War.

Chamoun asked for assistance proclaiming that Communists were going to overthrow his government. Chamoun was responding not only to the revolt of former political bosses, but also to the fact that both Egypt and Syria had taken the opportunity to deploy proxies into the Lebanese conflict. Thus the Arab Nationalist Movement (ANM), led by George Habash and later to become the Popular Front for the Liberation of Palestine (PFLP) and a faction of the PLO, were deployed to Lebanon by Nasser.

The ANM were a clandestine militia implicated in attempted coups against both the Jordanian monarchy and the Iraqi president throughout the 1950s at Nasser's bidding. The founding members of Fatah, including Yasser Arafat and Khalil Wazir, also flew to Lebanon to use the insurrection as a means by which a war could be fomented toward Israel. They participated in the fighting by directing armed forces against the government security in the city of Tripoli according to Yezid Sayigh's work.

In 1958, President Chamoun was unable to convince the Maronite army commander, Fuad Chehab, to use the armed forces against Muslim demonstrators, fearing that getting involved in internal politics would split his small and weak multi-confessional force. The Phalange militia came to the president's aid instead to bring a final end to the road blockades which were crippling the major cities. Encouraged by its efforts during this conflict, later that year, principally through violence and the success of general strikes in Beirut, the Phalange achieved what journalists dubbed the "counterrevolution". By their actions the Phalangists brought down the government of Prime Minister Karami and secured for their leader, Pierre Gemayel, a position in the four-man cabinet that was subsequently formed.

Estimates of the Phalange's membership by Yezid Sayigh and other academic sources put them at a few thousand. Non-academic sources tend to inflate the Phalanges membership. What should be kept in mind was that this insurrection was met with widespread disapproval by many Lebanese who wanted no part in the regional politics and many young men aided the Phalange in their suppression of the insurrection, especially as many of the demonstrators were little more than proxy forces hired by groups such as the ANM and Fatah founders as well as being hired by the defeated parliamentary bosses.

=== Demographic tensions ===
==== Palestinian insurgency in Lebanon ====
In the 1960s Lebanon was relatively calm, but this soon changed. Fatah and other Palestinian Liberation Organization factions had long been active among the 400,000 Palestinian refugees in Lebanese camps. Throughout the 1960s, the center for armed Palestinian activities had been in Jordan. They were forced to relocate after being evicted by King Hussein during the 1970 Black September in Jordan. Fatah and other Palestinian groups attempted to mount a coup in Jordan by incentivizing a split in the Jordanian army, something that the ANM had attempted to do a decade earlier by Nasser's bidding. Jordan responded, and expelled the Palestinian forces into Lebanon. When they arrived, they created "a State within the State". This action was not welcomed by the Lebanese government, and this shook Lebanon's fragile sectarian balance.

Solidarity with the Palestinians was expressed by the Lebanese Sunni Muslims, with the aim to change the political system from one of consensus amongst different sects, towards one where their power share would increase. Certain groups in the Lebanese National Movement wished to bring about a more secular and democratic order, but as this group increasingly included Islamist groups, encouraged to join by the PLO, the more progressive demands of the initial agenda was dropped by January 1976. Islamists did not support a secular order in Lebanon and wished to bring about rule by Muslim clerics.

These events, especially the role of Fatah and the Tripoli Islamist movement known as Tawhid, in changing the agenda being pursued by many groups, including Communists. This ragtag coalition has often been referred to as left-wing, but many participants were actually very conservative and had religious elements that did not share any broader ideological agenda. Rather, they were brought together by the short-term goal of overthrowing the established political order, each motivated by their own grievances.

These forces enabled the PLO / Fatah to transform the Western Part of Beirut into its stronghold. Fatah constituted 80% of the membership of the PLO and Fatah guerrillas now controlled most of its institutions. The PLO had taken over the heart of Sidon and Tyre in the early 1970s. It controlled great swathes of south Lebanon, in which the indigenous Shiite population had to suffer the humiliation of passing through PLO checkpoints and now they had worked their way by force into Beirut.

The PLO did this with the assistance of so-called volunteers from Libya and Algeria shipped in through the ports it controlled, as well as a number of Sunni Lebanese groups who had been trained and armed by PLO/ Fatah and encouraged to declare themselves as separate militias. However, as Rex Brynen makes clear in his publication on the PLO, these militias were nothing more than "shop-fronts" or in Arabic "Dakakin" for Fatah, armed gangs with no ideological foundation and no organic reason for their existence, except the fact their individual members were put on the PLO/ Fatah payroll.

In February 1975, the strike by fishermen at Sidon could be considered the first important episode that set off the outbreak of hostilities. That event involved a specific issue: the attempt of former President Camille Chamoun, also the head of the Maronite-oriented National Liberal Party, to monopolize fishing along the coast of Lebanon. The injustices perceived by the fishermen evoked sympathy from many Lebanese, and reinforced the resentment and antipathy that were widely felt against the state and the economic monopolies. The demonstrations against the fishing company were quickly transformed into a political action supported by the political left and their allies in the Palestine Liberation Organization (PLO). The state tried to suppress the demonstrators, and a sniper reportedly killed a popular figure in the city, the former Mayor of Sidon, Maarouf Saad.

Many non-academic sources claim a government sniper killed Saad; however, there is no evidence to support such a claim, and it appears that whoever had killed him had intended that what began as a small and quiet demonstration to evolve into something more. The sniper targeted Saad right at the end of the demonstration as it was dissipating.

Farid Khazen, sourcing the local histories of Sidon academics and eyewitnesses, gives a run-down of the puzzling events of the day that based on their research. Khazen reveals, based on the Sidon academic's work, that Saad was not in dispute with the fishing consortium made up of Yugoslav nationals. The Yugoslavian representatives in Lebanon had negotiated with the fisherman's union to make the fishermen shareholders in the company. The company offered to modernize the fishermen's equipment, buy their catch, and give their union an annual subsidy.

Saad, as a union representative, and not the mayor of Sidon at the time as many erroneous sources claim, was offered a place on the company's board. There has been some speculation that Saad's attempts to narrow the differences between the fishermen and the consortium, and his acceptance of a place on the board made him a target of attack by the conspirator, who sought a full conflagration around the small protest. The events in Sidon were not contained for long. The government began to lose control of the situation in 1975.

== Political divide and sectarianism ==
In the run-up to the war and its early stages, militias tried to be politically orientated non-sectarian forces, but due to the sectarian nature of Lebanese society, they inevitably gained their support from the same community as their leaders came from. In the long run almost all militias openly identified with a given community. The two main alliances were the Lebanese Front, consisting of nationalist Maronites who were against Palestinian militancy in Lebanon, and the Lebanese National Movement, which consisted of pro-Palestinian Leftists. The LNM dissolved after the Israeli invasion of 1982 and was replaced by the Lebanese National Resistance Front, known as Jammoul in Arabic.

Throughout the war most or all militias operated with little regard for human rights, and the sectarian character of some battles, made non-combatant civilians a frequent target.

=== Finances ===
As the war dragged on, the militias deteriorated ever further into mafia-style organizations, with many commanders turning to crime as their main occupation rather than fighting. Finances for the war effort were obtained in one or all of three ways:

1. Outside support: Notably from Syria or Israel. Other Arab governments and Iran also provided considerable funds. Alliances would shift frequently.
2. Local population: The militias, and the political parties they served, believed they had legitimate moral authority to raise taxes to defend their communities. Road checkpoints were a particularly common way to raise these (claimed) taxes. Such taxes were in principle viewed as legitimate by much of the population who identified with their community's militia. However, many militia fighters would use taxes/customs as a pretext to extort money. Furthermore, many people did not recognize militia's tax-raising authority, and viewed all militia money-raising activities as mafia-style extortion and theft.
3. Smuggling: During the civil war, Lebanon turned into one of the world's largest narcotics producers, with much of the hashish production centered in the Bekaa valley. However, much else was also smuggled, such as guns and supplies, all kinds of stolen goods, and regular trade—war or no war, Lebanon would not give up its role as the middleman in European-Arab business. Many battles were fought over Lebanon's ports, to gain smugglers access to the sea routes.

=== Cantons ===
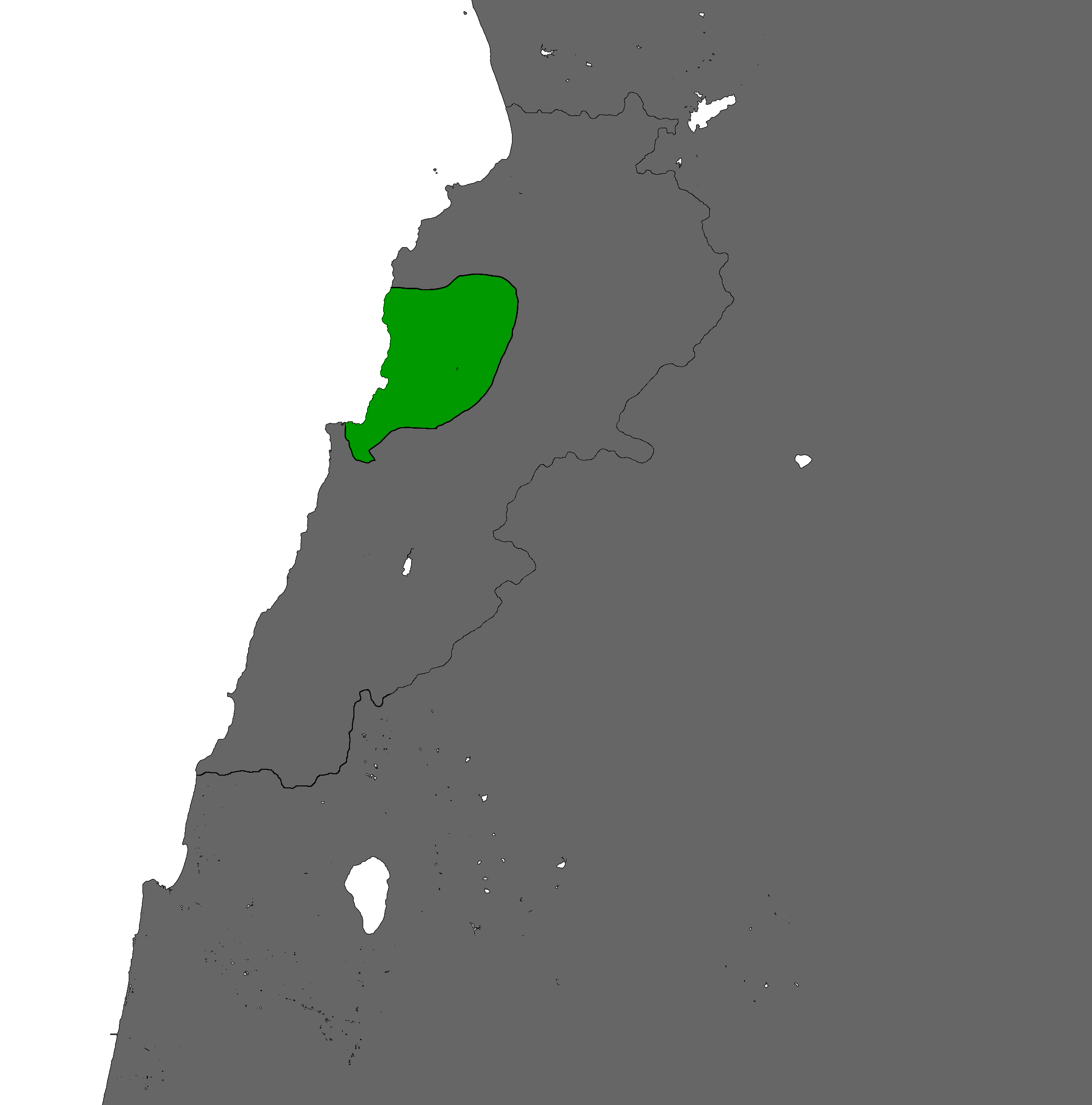
The East Beirut canton (Marounistan). One of many unrecognized administrations or "mini-states" during the Lebanese Civil War

As central government authority disintegrated and rival governments claimed national authority, the various parties/militias started to create comprehensive state administrations in their territory. These were known as cantons, Swiss-like autonomous provinces. The best known was "Marounistan", which was the Phalangist/Lebanese Forces territory. The Progressive Socialist Party's territory was the "Civil Administration of the Mountain", commonly known as the Jebel-el-Druze, a name which had formerly been used for a Druze state in Syria. The Marada area around Zghorta was known as the "Northern Canton".

Wilton Wynn, a TIME correspondent, visited the East Beirut Christian canton in 1976, the same year as its foundation. He reported that compared to the villages outside of the canton, in Maronite towns and villages no garbage littered the streets, gas was one-fifth the price charged in West Beirut and the price of bread was controlled to levels comparable to pre-war pricing.

=== Maronite Christians ===
Maronite Christian militias acquired arms from Romania and Bulgaria as well as from West Germany, Belgium and Israel, and drew supporters from the larger Maronite population in the north of the country, they were generally right-wing in their political outlook, and all the major Christian militias were Maronite-dominated, and other Christian sects played a secondary role.

Initially, the most powerful of the Maronite militias was the National Liberal Party, locally known as "Ahrar", who were politically led by the former president Camille Chamoun. The NLP had its own militia which was founded in 1968 and led by Camille's son Dany Chamoun, the Tigers Militia. Another party was the Kataeb Party, or Phalangists, which was founded by Pierre Gemayel in 1936. Kataeb similarly had its own militia which was officially formed in 1961, the Kataeb Regulatory Forces led by William Hawi until 1976 when Bachir Gemayel succeeded him. Kataeb Regulatory Forces merged with Tigers Militia and several minor groups (Al-Tanzim, Guardians of the Cedars, Lebanese Youth Movement, Tyous Team of Commandos) and formed an umbrella militia known as the Lebanese Forces (LF) which acted in unity, and were politically known as the Lebanese Front coalition. Before 1975, Maronite militias were reportedly supplied by weapons from Bulgaria, and by the onset of the war were receiving support from Iraq, Jordan, Pahlavi Iran, West Germany, Israel, and Saudi Arabia, who temporarily cut off their funding after Black Saturday. This funding enabled the newly formed Lebanese Forces militia to establish itself in Maronite-dominated strongholds, and rapidly transformed from an unorganized and poorly equipped militia into a fearsome armed group that now had its own armor, artillery, commando units (SADM), a small Navy, and a highly advanced Intelligence branch. Meanwhile, in the north, the Zgharta Liberation Army served as the private militia of the Franjieh family in Zgharta, which became allied with Syria after breaking with the Lebanese Front in 1978.

In 1980, after months of intra Christian clashes, the Tigers militia of Dany Chamoun split with the Lebanese Forces which was dominated by the Kataeb members. Led by Bachir Gemayel, Kataeb launched a surprise attack on the Tigers in what became known as the Safra massacre, which claimed the lives of up to 83 people, effectively bringing an end to the Tigers as a militia. In 1985, under the leadership of Samir Geagea and Hobeika, the Lebanese Forces split from the Kataeb and other groups to form an independent militia by the name of Lebanese Forces. The Command Council then elected Hobeika to be LF President, and he appointed Geagea to be LF Chief of Staff. In January 1986, Geagea and Hobeika's relationship broke down over Hobeika's support for the pro-Syrian Tripartite Accord, and an internal civil war began. The Geagea-Hobeika Conflict resulted in 800 to 1000 casualties before Geagea secured himself as LF leader and Hobeika fled. Hobeika formed the Lebanese Forces – Executive Command which remained allied with Syria until the end of the war.

=== Secularists ===
Although several Lebanese militias claimed to be secular, most were little more than vehicles for sectarian interests. Still, there existed a number of non-religious groups, primarily but not exclusively of the left and/or Pan-Arab right.

Examples of this were the Lebanese Communist Party (LCP) and the more radical and independent Communist Action Organization (COA). Another notable example was the pan-Syrian Syrian Social Nationalist Party (SSNP), which promoted the concept of Greater Syria, in contrast to Pan-Arab or Lebanese nationalism. The SSNP was generally aligned with the Syrian government, although it did not ideologically approve of the Ba'athist government (however, this has changed recently, under Bashar Al-Assad, the SSNP having been allowed to exert political activity in Syria as well). The multi-confessional SSNP was led by Inaam Raad, a Catholic and Abdallah Saadeh, a Greek Orthodox. It was active in North Lebanon (Koura and Akkar), West Beirut (around Hamra Street), in Mount Lebanon (High Metn, Baabda, Aley and Chouf), in South Lebanon (Zahrani, Nabatieh, Marjayoun and Hasbaya) and the Beqqa Valley (Baalbeck, Hermel and Rashaya).

Another secular group was the South Lebanon Army (SLA), led by Saad Haddad. The SLA operated in South Lebanon in coordination with the Israelis, and worked for the Israeli-backed parallel government, called "the Government of Free Lebanon". The SLA began as a split from the Army of Free Lebanon, a Maronite Christian faction within the Lebanese Army. Their initial goal was to be a bulwark against PLO raids and attacks into the Galilee, although they later focused on fighting Hezbollah. The officers tended to be mostly Christians, while the ordinary soldiers were an amalgam of Christians, Shiites, Druze and Sunnis. The SLA continued to operate after the civil war but collapsed after the Israeli army withdrew from South Lebanon in 2000. Many SLA soldiers fled to Israel, while others were captured in Lebanon and prosecuted for collaboration with Israel and treason.

Two competing Ba'ath movements were involved in the early stages of the war: a nationalist one known as "pro-Iraqi" headed by Abdul-Majeed Al-Rafei (Sunni) and Nicola Y. Ferzli (Greek Orthodox Christian), and a Marxist one known as "pro-Syrian" headed by Assem Qanso (Shiite).

The Kurdistan Workers' Party at the time had training camps in Lebanon, where they received support from the Syrians and the PLO. During the Israeli invasion, all PKK units were ordered to fight the Israeli forces. Eleven PKK fighters died in the conflict. Mahsum Korkmaz was the commander of all PKK forces in Lebanon.

The Armenian Marxist-Leninist militia ASALA was founded in PLO-controlled territory of West Beirut in 1975. This militia was led by revolutionary fighter Monte Melkonian and group-founder Hagop Hagopian. Closely aligned with the Palestinians, ASALA fought many battles on the side of the Lebanese National Movement and the PLO, most prominently against Israeli forces and their right-wing allies during the 1982 phase of the war. Melkonian was field commander during these battles, and assisted the PLO in its defense of West Beirut.

=== Palestinians ===
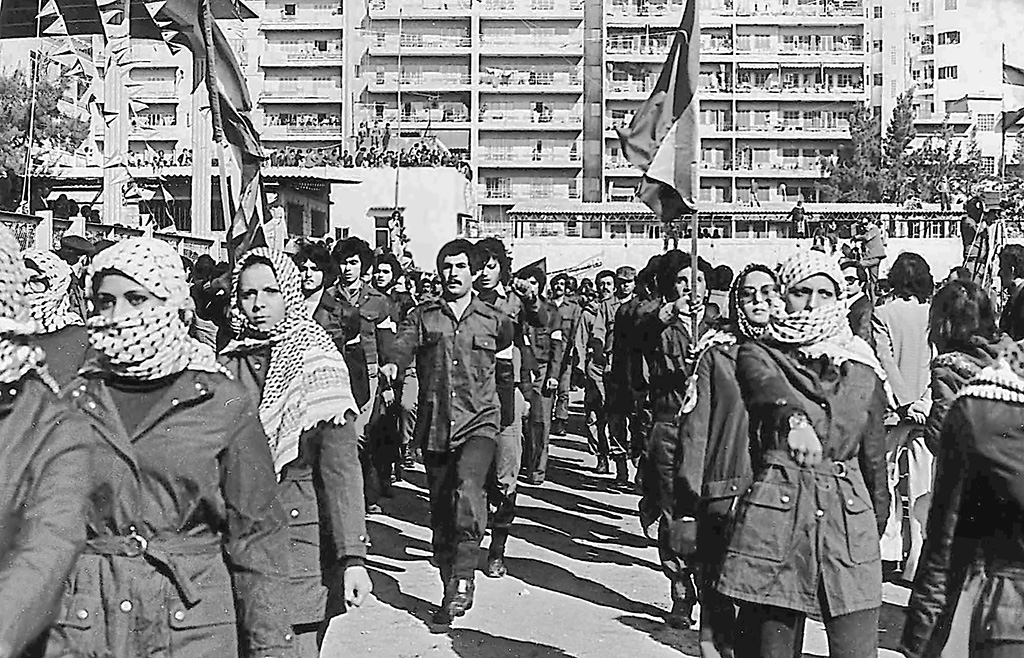
Palestinian Fatah fighters in Beirut in 1979

The Palestinian movement relocated most of its fighting strength to Lebanon at the end of 1970 after being expelled from Jordan in the events known as Black September. The umbrella organization, the Palestine Liberation Organization (PLO)—by itself undoubtedly Lebanon's most potent fighting force at the time—was little more than a loose confederation, but its leader, Yassir Arafat, controlled the PLO's largest and most dominant faction, Fatah, effectively making him the strongman of the PLO. Arafat allowed little oversight to be exercised over PLO finances as he was the ultimate source for all decisions made in directing financial matters.

Arafat's control of funds, channeled directly to him by the oil producing countries like Saudi Arabia, Iraq, and Libya meant that he had little real functional opposition to his leadership and although ostensibly rival factions in the PLO existed, this masked a stable loyalty towards Arafat so long as he was able to dispense financial rewards to his followers and members of the PLO guerrilla factions. Unlike the Lebanese, the Palestinians were not sectarian. Palestinian Christians similarly supported Arab Nationalism and fought with their Muslim compatriots against the Maronite Lebanese militias.

The PLO mainstream was represented by Arafat's powerful Fatah, which waged guerrilla warfare but did not have a strong core ideology, except the claim to seek the liberation of Palestine. As a result, they gained broad appeal with a refugee population of moderately conservative Islamic values. The more ideological factions included George Habash's Marxist-Leninist Popular Front for the Liberation of Palestine (PFLP), and its splinter, the Democratic Front for the Liberation of Palestine (DFLP) of Nayef Hawatmeh. Both Habash and Hawatmeh were Christians.

Fatah was instrumental in splitting the DF from the PFLP in the early days of the PFLPs formation so as to diminish the appeal and competition the PFLP posed to Fatah. Lesser roles were played by the fractious Palestinian Liberation Front (PLF) and another split-off from the PFLP, the Syrian-aligned Popular Front for the Liberation of Palestine - General Command (PFLP-GC). To complicate things, the rival Ba'athist countries of Syria and Iraq both set up Palestinian puppet organizations within the PLO. The as-Sa'iqa was a Syrian-controlled militia, paralleled by the Arab Liberation Front (ALF) under Iraqi command. The Syrian government could also count on the Syrian brigades of the Palestine Liberation Army (PLA), formally but not functionally the PLO's regular army. Some PLA units sent by Egypt were under Arafat's command.

When the war officially started in 1975, Palestinian armed manpower numbered roughly 21,000, divided into:

Group	Armed manpower
Fatah	7,000
As-Sa'iqa	4,500
DFLP	2,500
Arab Liberation Front	2,500
Popular Resistance	2,200
PFLP	2,000
PFLP–GC	2,000
Popular Struggle Front	200
Total	20,900

=== Druze ===
The flag of the PSP

The small Druze sect, strategically and dangerously seated on the Chouf in central Lebanon, had no natural allies, and so were compelled to put much effort into building alliances. Under the leadership of the Jumblatt family, first Kamal Jumblatt (the LNM leader) and then his son Walid, the Progressive Socialist Party (PSP) (الحزب التقدمي الاشتراكي, al-hizb al-taqadummi al-ishtiraki) served as an effective Druze militia, building excellent ties to the Soviet Union mainly, and with Syria upon the withdrawal of Israel to the south of the country. However, many Druze in Lebanon at the time were also members of the Syrian Social Nationalist Party.

Under the leadership of Jumblatt, the PSP was a major political element in the Lebanese National Movement (LNM) which supported Lebanon's Arab identity and sympathized with the Palestinians. Jumblatt built a militia, the People's Liberation Army, which received financial support from the USSR and Libya, and boasted around 2,500 militiamen at the start of the war, increasing to 10,000 by early 1984 during the Mountain War. The militia played a small role in the actual combat, instead limiting itself to fighting in Mount Lebanon area.

Its main adversaries were the Maronite Kataeb militia, and later the Lebanese Forces militia, which absorbed the Kataeb. The PSP suffered a major setback after the assassination of Kamal Jumblatt, who was then succeeded by his son Walid. From the Israeli withdrawal from the Chouf in 1983 to the end of the civil war, the PSP ran the Civil Administration of the Mountain in the area under its control. Tolls levied at PSP militia checkpoints provided a major source of income for the administration.

The PSP played an important role in the Mountain War under the lead of Walid Jumblatt. After the Israelis withdrew from Chouf, important battles took place between the PSP backed by PFLP-GC, Fatah al-Intifada and Syrian army, and the Lebanese Forces backed by Lebanese army and the Multinational Force. PSP armed members were accused of several massacres that took place during that war.

=== Shia Muslims ===
The flag of Amal Movement

In the 1960s and early 70s, Lebanon's poorest community, the Shiites, lacked an initial organization of their own, and thus lent their numbers to a variety of parties and organizations. Many Shiites joined the Lebanese Communist Party, where they formed half of its membership by the 1970s. Some joined other leftist parties, including the Communist Action Organization, the Arab Socialist Action Party, and the various Baathist factions led by Iraq and Syria, as well as the Nasserist al-Mourabitoun (45% of the membership in 1985), and the SSNP. A number of Shiites also joined Palestinian factions and constituted sizeable numbers in the PFLP, Fatah and Arab Liberation Front. Nevertheless, the majority of the Shiite population was not represented by any particular party.

With the start of hostilities in 1975, Musa Sadr publicly announced the establishment of the Movement of the Dispossessed (later known as AMAL). Sadr adamantly opposed Lebanese infighting, declaring a hunger strike several times, and severely criticized the neglect of Shiite areas by the government and traditional Shiite leaderships. Sadr, a Palestinian supporter himself, criticized both Israel and the actions of the PLO actions in the South, which had costed thousands of Shiite civilians' lives. Amal quickly attracted the masses and its armed ranks quickly grew to an estimated 6,000 according to the SAVAK in 1975.

A radical turnover occurred following the Israeli invasion of Lebanon in 1982, with the establishment of Hezbollah. Hezbollah's main objective was to end Israeli occupation and western influence in Lebanon, and its Islamic ideology attracted many young Shiites eager to fight the new occupation. By 1984, thousands of Shiites had been enlisted into Hezbollah as well as most of the important Shiite clergy, including Ragheb Harb. Dahieh, where most Shiites lived, became known as the party's recruition hub, the Bekaa its training ground, and the South its operational ground. Support for Leftist and Palestinian groups declined, and many Shiites moved their support to their communal parties. In 1988, Hezbollah's militia could boast a total of 25,000 fighters. By the 1990s, Hezbollah was the best organized Shia political party, and enjoyed the largest base of popular support.

==== Alawites ====
The Lebanese Alawites, followers of a sect of Shia Islam, were represented by the 1,000-strong Red Knights Militia of the Arab Democratic Party, which was pro-Syrian due to the Alawites being dominant in Syria, and mainly acted in Northern Lebanon around Tripoli.

=== Sunni Muslims ===
Some Sunni factions received support from Libya and Iraq, and a number of minor militias existed due to a general reluctance on the part of Sunnis to join military organisations throughout the civil war. The more prominent groups were secular and holding a Nasserist ideology, or otherwise having pan-Arab and Arab nationalist leanings. A few Islamist ones emerged at later stages of the war, such as the Tawhid Movement that took its base in Tripoli, and the Jama'a Islamiyya, which gave a Lebanese expression of the Muslim Brotherhood in terms of political orientations and practice. The main Sunni-led organization was the al-Mourabitoun, a major west Beirut based force. They were led by Ibrahim Kulaylat, fought with the Palestinians against the Israelis during the invasion of 1982. There was also the Popular Nasserist Organization in Sidon that was formed through the followers of Maarouf Saad, and who rallied later behind his son Mustafa Saad, and now are led by Usama Saad. The Sixth of February Movement was another pro-Palestinian Nasserist minor militia that sided with the PLO in the War of the Camps in the 1980s.

=== Armenians ===
The Armenian parties were Christian by religion but left-wing in outlook, and were therefore uneasy committing to either side of the fighting. As a result, the Armenian parties attempted, with some success, to follow a policy of militant neutrality, with their militias fighting only when required to defend the Armenian areas. However, it was not uncommon for individual Armenians to choose to fight in the Lebanese Forces, and a small number chose to fight on the other side for the Lebanese National Movement/Lebanese National Resistance Front.

The Beirut suburbs of Bourj Hamoud and Naaba were controlled by the Armenian Dashnak party. In September 1979, these were attacked by the Kataeb in an attempt to bring all Christian areas under Bashir Gemayel's control. The Armenian Dashnak militia defeated the Kataeb attacks and retained control. The fighting led to 40 deaths.

The Armenian Revolutionary Federation in Lebanon refused to take sides in the conflict though its armed wing the Justice Commandos of the Armenian Genocide and the Armenian Secret Army for the Liberation of Armenia did carry out assassinations and operations during the war.

== Chronology of decisive events ==
Chronology
13 April 1975	Battles between the PLO and the Kataeb Christian militia spread to parts of Beirut, especially the downtown area which is totally destroyed leading to the demarcation line between the two parts of the city. Many militias are formed on both sides and hundreds of civilians are killed or taken hostage. The government divides and the army is split. The militias usurp many functions of the state.
January 1976	The Karantina massacre and the Damour massacre.
May 1976	Elias Sarkis is elected president.
Summer 1976	The Tel al-Zaatar massacre occurs. The Syrian army intervenes for the first time.
October 1976	An Arab League summit occurs to instill a ceasefire backed by the deployment of peacekeeping troops.
March–April 1977	Multiple massacres of Christians occur in the Chouf following the assassination of Kamal Jumblatt.
February–March 1978	The Hundred Days' War begins and the ceasefire ends. The United Nations sends troops and foreign powers deploy aid to the two sides of the war.
February 1979	The Iranian revolution occurs helping to radicalize the Shiite movement in Lebanon.
July 1980	Bashir Gemayel, leader of the Kataeb militia, unites all the Christian militias by force, putting in place the political party, Lebanese Forces.
Summer, 1982	The 1982 Lebanon War occurs as well as the Siege of Beirut. Bashir Gemayel is elected president on 23 August and assassinated 14 September. Soon after the Sabra and Shatila massacre occurs. The Israelis withdraw. Amin Gemayel is elected president.
14 September 1982	Bashir Gemayel was assassinated 22 days after getting elected.
April 1983	1983 United States embassy bombing occurs.
Summer 1983	The Mountain War begins.
October 1983	1983 Beirut barracks bombing occurs.
February 1984	The Lebanese army, who controlled Beirut since the Israeli withdrawal, were accused of partisanship with the Lebanese forces, mass arrests, etc. They were expelled from West Beirut following their defeat in the February 6 Intifada. The Amal Party and the Druze Progressive Socialist Party take control of West Beirut. The multi-nationals withdraw from Lebanon.
February 1985	The Israelis withdraw from Sidon but remain in the south. Armed resistance to Israeli occupation intensifies. Especially from Hezbollah. The War of the Camps arises.
March 1985	Assassination attempt on Hezbollah leader, Mohammad Hussein Fadlallah.
June, December 1987	Rashid Karami is assassinated on 1 June 1987. The First Intifada begins and the anger toward Israel in Lebanon increases. There are hundreds of Lebanese and Palestinians imprisoned by Israel.
September 1988	Amin Gemayel's presidential term expires and he appoints the commander of the army, General Michel Aoun as interim prime minister.
14 March 1989	General Aoun declares war on the Syrian presence in Lebanon. After seven months of shelling a ceasefire is negotiated by the Arab League.
October–November 1989	The Taif Agreement occurs. René Moawad is elected president and is assassinated 17 days later. Elias Hrawi is then elected. General Aoun denounces the legitimacy of these presidencies and a new commander of the army is appointed.
30 January 1990	Heavy fighting begins between the Lebanese army still under General Aoun's control and the Lebanese Forces. As well as fighting between Amal and Hezbollah and continued resistance to Israeli occupation and Israeli reprisal raids.
13 October 1990	General Aoun is forced out of the presidential palace and goes into exile. The October 13 massacre occurs. Selim Hoss assumes command of the country except for the part still occupied by Israel. The armed forces are reunited under a central command.
24 December 1990	A National Reconciliation is formed under the leadership of Omar Karami. The Taif Agreement is for the first time being put into practice.
26 August 1991	Parliament passes the law of General Amnesty.
Summer 1992	The first parliamentary elections in twenty years take place.

== First phase (1975–1977) ==
=== Sectarian violence and massacres ===
Throughout the spring of 1975, minor clashes in Lebanon had been building up towards all-out conflict, with the Lebanese National Movement (LNM) pitted against the Phalange, and the ever-weaker national government wavering between the need to maintain order and cater to its constituency. On the morning of 13 April 1975, unidentified gunmen in a speeding car fired on a church in the Christian East Beirut suburb of Ain el-Rummaneh, killing four people, including two Maronite Phalangists. Hours later, Phalangists led by the Gemayels killed 30 Palestinians traveling in Ain el-Rummaneh. Citywide clashes erupted in response to this "Bus Massacre". The Battle of the Hotels began in October 1975, and lasted until March in 1976.

On 6 December 1975, a day later known as Black Saturday, the killings of four Phalange members led Phalange to quickly and temporarily set up roadblocks throughout Beirut at which identification cards were inspected for religious affiliation. Many Palestinians or Lebanese Muslims passing through the roadblocks were killed immediately. Additionally, Phalange members took hostages and attacked Muslims in East Beirut. Muslim and Palestinian militias retaliated with force, increasing the total death count to between 200 and 600 civilians and militiamen. After this point, all-out fighting began between the militias.

On 18 January 1976 an estimated 1,000–1,500 people were killed by Maronite forces in the Karantina Massacre, followed two days later by a retaliatory strike on Damour by Palestinian militias. These two massacres prompted a mass exodus of Muslims and Christians, as people fearing retribution fled to areas under the control of their own sect. The ethnic and religious layout of the residential areas of the capital encouraged this process, and East and West Beirut were increasingly transformed into what was in effect Christian and Muslim Beirut. Also, the number of Maronite leftists who had allied with the LNM, and Muslim conservatives with the government, dropped sharply, as the war revealed itself as an utterly sectarian conflict. Another effect of the massacres was to bring in Yassir Arafat's well-armed Fatah and thereby the Palestine Liberation Organisation on the side of the LNM, as Palestinian sentiment was by now completely hostile to the Maronite forces.

=== 1976 Syrian invasion ===
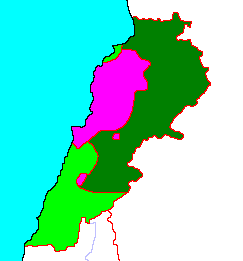
Power balance in Lebanon, 1976: Dark Green – controlled by Syria; Purple – controlled by Maronite groups; Light Green – controlled by Palestinian militias

On 22 January 1976, Syrian President Hafez al-Assad brokered a truce between the two sides, while covertly beginning to move Syrian troops into Lebanon under the guise of the Palestine Liberation Army in order to bring the PLO back under Syrian influence and prevent the disintegration of Lebanon. Despite this, the violence continued to escalate. In March 1976, Lebanese President Suleiman Frangieh requested that Syria formally intervene. Days later, Assad sent a message to the United States asking them not to interfere if he were to send troops into Lebanon.

On 8 May 1976, Elias Sarkis, who was supported by Syria, defeated Frangieh in a presidential election held by the Lebanese Parliament. However, Frangieh refused to step down. On 1 June 1976, 12,000 regular Syrian troops entered Lebanon and began conducting operations against Palestinian and leftist militias. This technically put Syria on the same side as Israel, as Israel had already begun to supply Maronite forces with arms, tanks, and military advisers in May 1976. Syria had its own political and territorial interests in Lebanon, which harbored cells of Sunni Islamists and anti-Ba'athist Muslim Brotherhood.

Since January, the Tel al-Zaatar refugee camp in East Beirut had been under siege by Maronite Christian militias. On 12 August 1976, supported by Syria, Maronite forces managed to overwhelm the Palestinian and leftist militias defending the camp. The Christian militia massacred 1,000–1,500 civilians, which unleashed heavy criticism against Syria from the Arab world.

On 19 October 1976, the Battle of Aishiya took place, when a combined force of PLO and a Communist militia attacked Aishiya, an isolated Maronite village in a mostly Muslim area. The Artillery Corps of the Israel Defense Forces fired 24 shells (66 kilograms of TNT each) from US-made 175-millimeter field artillery units at the attackers, repelling their first attempt. However, the PLO and Communists returned at night, when low visibility made Israeli artillery far less effective. The Maronite population of the village fled. They returned in 1982.

In October 1976, Syria accepted the proposal of the Arab League summit in Riyadh. This gave Syria a mandate to keep 40,000 troops in Lebanon as the bulk of an Arab Deterrent Force charged with disentangling the combatants and restoring calm. Other Arab nations were also part of the ADF, but they lost interest relatively soon, and Syria was again left in sole control, now with the ADF as a diplomatic shield against international criticism. The Civil War was officially paused at this point, and an uneasy quiet settled over Beirut and most of the rest of Lebanon. In the south, however, the climate began to deteriorate as a consequence of the gradual return of PLO combatants, who had been required to vacate central Lebanon under the terms of the Riyadh Accords.

During 1975–1977, 60,000 people were killed.

=== Uneasy quiet ===
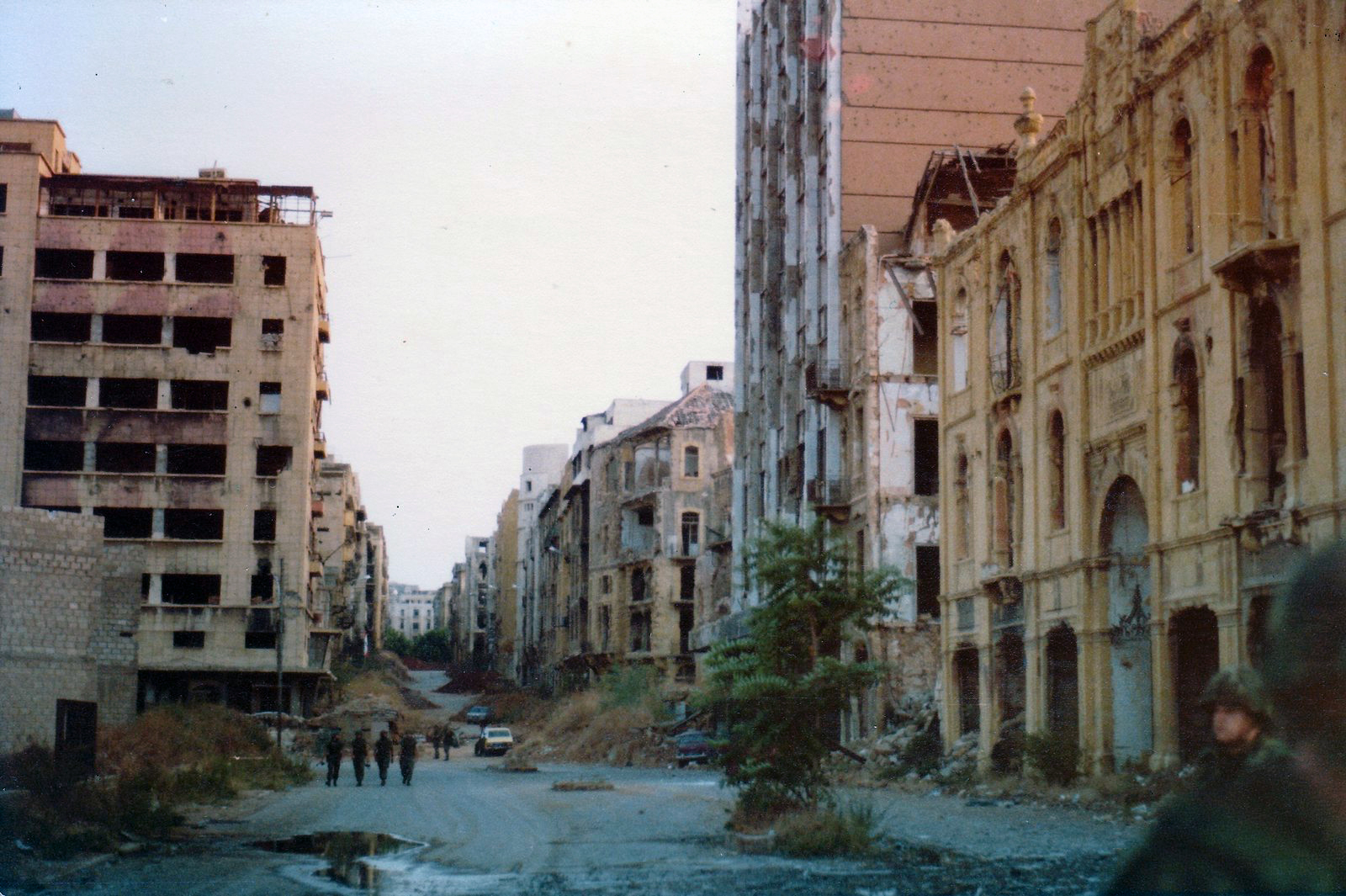
The Green Line that separated West and East Beirut, 1982

The nation was now effectively divided, with southern Lebanon and the western half of Beirut becoming bases for the PLO and Muslim-based militias, and the Christians in control of East Beirut and the Christian section of Mount Lebanon. The main confrontation line in divided Beirut was known as the Green Line.

In East Beirut, in 1976, Maronite leaders of the National Liberal Party (NLP), the Kataeb Party and the Lebanese Renewal Party joined in the Lebanese Front, a political counterpoint to the LNM. Their militias—the Tigers, Kataeb Regulatory Forces (KRF) and Guardians of the Cedars—entered a loose coalition known as the Lebanese Forces, to form a military wing for the Lebanese Front. From the very beginning, the Kataeb and its Regulatory Forces' militia, under the leadership of Bashir Gemayel, dominated the LF. In 1977–80, through absorbing or destroying smaller militias, he both consolidated control and strengthened the LF into the dominant Maronite force.

In March the same year, Lebanese National Movement leader Kamal Jumblatt was assassinated. The murder was widely blamed on the Syrian government. While Jumblatt's role as leader of the Druze Progressive Socialist Party was filled surprisingly smoothly by his son, Walid Jumblatt, the LNM disintegrated after his death. Although the anti-government pact of leftists, Shi'a, Sunni, Palestinians and Druze would stick together for some time more, their wildly divergent interests tore at opposition unity. Sensing the opportunity, Hafez al-Assad immediately began splitting up both the Maronite and Muslim coalitions in a game of divide and conquer.

== Second phase (1977–1982) ==
=== Hundred Days' War ===
The Hundred Days' War was a sub-conflict within the Lebanese Civil War, which occurred in the Lebanese capital Beirut between February and April 1978.

The only political person who remained in East Beirut Achrafiyeh throughout was president Camille Chamoun, who refused to leave. It was fought between the Maronite forces and the Syrian troops of the Arab Deterrent Force (ADF). The Syrian troops shelled the Christian Beirut area of Achrafiyeh for 100 days. The conflict resulted in Syrian Army's expulsion from East Beirut and the end of Arab Deterrent Force's task in Lebanon and revealed the true intentions of the Syrians in Lebanon. The conflict resulted in 160 dead and 400 injured.

=== 1978 Israeli invasion ===
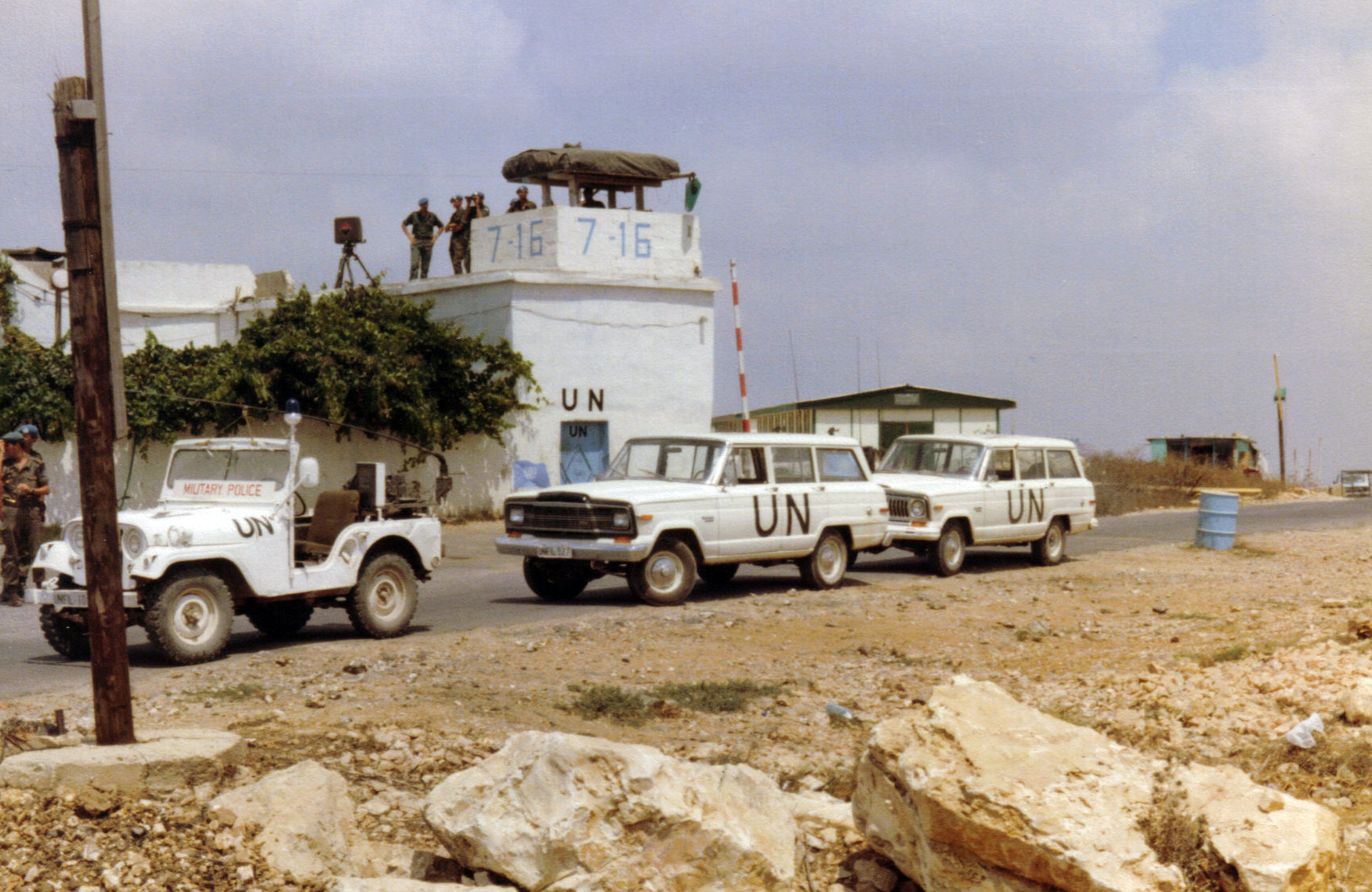
UNIFIL base, 1981

PLO attacks from Lebanon into Israel in 1977 and 1978 escalated tensions between the countries. On 11 March 1978, eleven Fatah fighters landed on a beach in northern Israel and proceeded to hijack two buses full of passengers on the Haifa–Tel-Aviv road, shooting at passing vehicles in what became known as the Coastal Road massacre. They killed 37 and wounded 76 Israelis before being killed in a firefight with Israeli forces. Israel invaded Lebanon four days later in Operation Litani. The Israeli Army occupied most of the area south of the Litani River. The UN Security Council passed Resolution 425 calling for immediate Israeli withdrawal and creating the UN Interim Force in Lebanon (UNIFIL), charged with attempting to establish peace.

=== Israel's "Security Zone" in Lebanon ===
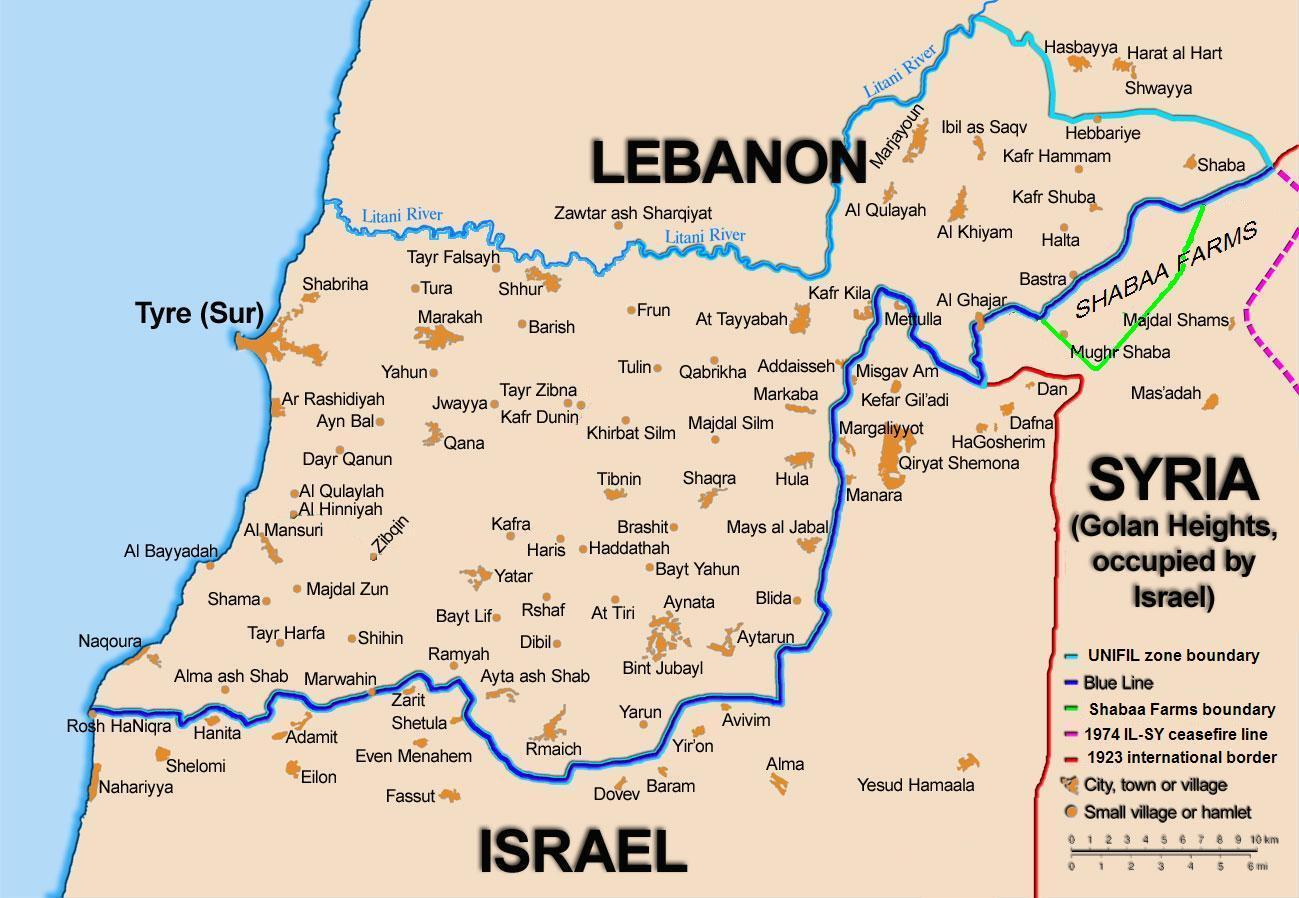
The Blue Line demarcation line between Lebanon and Israel, established by the UN after the Israeli withdrawal from southern Lebanon in 1978

Israeli forces withdrew later in 1978, but retained control of the southern region by managing a 12-mile (19 km) wide security zone along the border. These positions were held by the South Lebanon Army (SLA), a Christian-Shi'a militia under the leadership of Major Saad Haddad backed by Israel. The Israeli Prime Minister, Likud's Menachem Begin, compared the plight of the Christian minority in southern Lebanon (then about 5% of the population in SLA territory) to that of European Jews during World War II. The PLO routinely attacked Israel during the period of the cease-fire, with over 270 documented attacks. People in Galilee regularly had to leave their homes during these shellings. Documents captured in PLO headquarters after the invasion showed they had come from Lebanon. Arafat refused to condemn these attacks on the grounds that the cease-fire was only relevant to Lebanon.

Between June and August 1979 the IDF increased its artillery bombardments and air strikes on targets in Southern Lebanon resulting in the killing of around forty people and a mass exodus of civilians. On 27 June four Syrian planes were shot down over Southern Lebanon. One of them reportedly hit by Palestinian ground fire.

In April 1980 the presence of UNIFIL soldiers in the buffer zone led to the At Tiri incident.

=== Day of the Long Knives ===
The Safra massacre, known as the Day of the Long Knives, occurred in the coastal town Safra (north of Beirut) on 7 July 1980, as part of Bashir Gemayel's effort to consolidate all the Maronite fighters under his leadership in the Lebanese Forces. The Phalangist forces launched a surprise attack on the Tigers Militia, which claimed the lives of 83 people, most of whom were normal citizens and not from the militia.

=== Battle of Zahleh ===
The first six months of 1981 brought Lebanon some of the worst violence since 1976. In the South, there was an increase in clashes between Haddad's rebel militia and UNIFIL. This followed an agreement reached in Damascus between Lebanese President Élias Sarkis and United Nations officials on the deployment of Lebanese army soldiers into areas where UNIFIL forces where stationed. The agreement, which was reached in early March, was rejected by Haddad. On 16 March three Nigerian soldiers serving with UNIFIL were killed by artillery fire from Haddad's forces.

Another factor was political activity in Israel ahead of elections in June which Prime Minister Menachem Begin and his Likud party were expected to lose. Begin publicly acknowledged that Israel had an alliance with Bashir Gemayel's Phalange militia and would intervene if the Syrian Army attacked them. Defence Minister Rafael Eitan visited Jounieh on several occasions. In South Lebanon there were regular airstrikes around Nabatieh and Beaufort Castle. On the night of 9 April IDF commandos raided five different PLO positions in the South.

In Beirut sniper fire across the Green Line between East and West Beirut increased, climaxing in April with lengthy artillery exchanges. The main combatants were elements of the Lebanese Army and the Syrian ADF.

Across the mountains in Zahleh, the Christian town on the Western edge of the Beqaa Valley, the Phalangist militia had become dominant and were reinforcing outposts with artillery as well as opening a new road to the coast and their heartland. In early April clashes escalated around the town and the Syrian Army imposed a siege. There were also outbreaks of fighting in neighbouring Baalbek.

Meanwhile, in the South, on 19 April, Haddad's militia shelled Sidon, killing sixteen civilians. Some reports stated that the attack was in response to a request from Bashir Gemayel in order to relieve the Syrian pressure on the Phalangists in Zahleh. On 27 April Syrian troops launched an offensive against the Phalagists' mountain outposts. The following day the Israeli Air Force shot down two Syrian helicopters near Zahleh. Despite this intervention the Syrians were able to take control of the mountain road and tighten the siege of the town. In response to the Israeli action the Syrians moved antiaircraft Sam 6 missiles into the Northern Beqaa. In Israel the missiles became a political issue. On 27 May Israeli commandos attacked a PFLP-GC missile site near Damour, South of Beirut. Four Libyan technicians were killed. Two Syrian soldiers were also killed when their truck and a civilian car were destroyed. Begin later revealed that the United States was informed in advance of the raid. In early July the Syrians ended the three month long siege of Zahleh. The Phalangists' power in the town had been reduced but their alliance with Israel remained intact. The planned deployment of Government troops into the South was abandoned.

On 17 July 1981, Israeli aircraft bombed multi-story apartment buildings in Beirut that contained offices of PLO associated groups. The Lebanese delegate to the United Nations Security Council claimed that 300 civilians had been killed and 800 wounded. The bombing led to worldwide condemnation, and a temporary embargo on the export of U.S. aircraft to Israel. In August 1981, defense minister Ariel Sharon began to draw up plans to attack PLO military infrastructure in West Beirut, where PLO headquarters and command bunkers were located.

== Third phase (1982–1984) ==
=== 1982 Israeli invasion ===
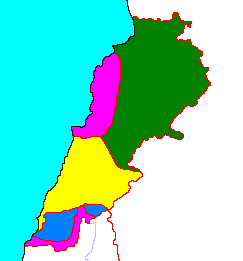
The power balance in Lebanon, 1983: Green – controlled by Syria; Purple – controlled Maronite groups, Yellow – controlled by Israel, Blue – controlled by the United Nations

==== Pretext ====
On 3 June 1982, the Abu Nidal Organization, a splinter group of Fatah, attempted to assassinate Israeli ambassador Shlomo Argov in London. Israel carried out a retaliatory aerial attack on PLO and PFLP targets in West Beirut that led to over 100 casualties. The PLO responded by launching a counterattack from Lebanon with rockets and artillery, which constituted a clear violation of the ceasefire.

Meanwhile, on 5 June, the UN Security Council unanimously passed Resolution 508 calling for "all the parties to the conflict to cease immediately and simultaneously all military activities within Lebanon and across the Lebanese-Israeli border and no later than 0600 hours local time on Sunday, 6 June 1982".

==== Israeli alliance with Christian militias ====
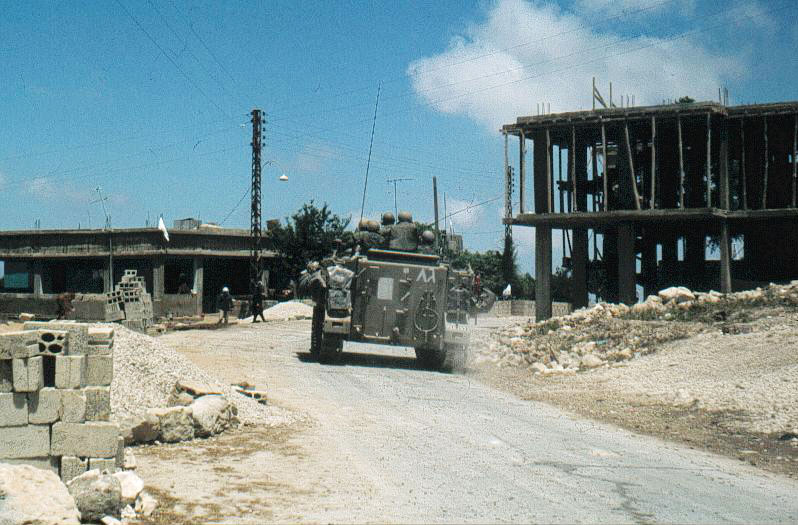
Israeli troops in South Lebanon, June 1982

Israel launched Operation Peace for Galilee on 6 June 1982, attacking PLO bases in Lebanon. Israeli forces quickly drove 25 miles (40 km) into Lebanon, moving into East Beirut with the tacit support of Maronite leaders and militia. When the Israeli cabinet convened to authorize the invasion, Sharon described it as a plan to advance 40 kilometers into Lebanon, demolish PLO strongholds, and establish an expanded security zone that would put northern Israel out of range of PLO rockets.

Israeli chief of staff Rafael Eitan and Sharon had already ordered the invading forces to head straight for Beirut, in accord with Sharon's plan from September 1981. The UN Security Council passed a further resolution on 6 June 1982, United Nations Security Council Resolution 509 demanding that Israel withdraw to the internationally recognized boundaries of Lebanon. On 8 June 1982, the United States vetoed a proposed resolution demanding that Israel withdraw.

==== Siege of Beirut ====
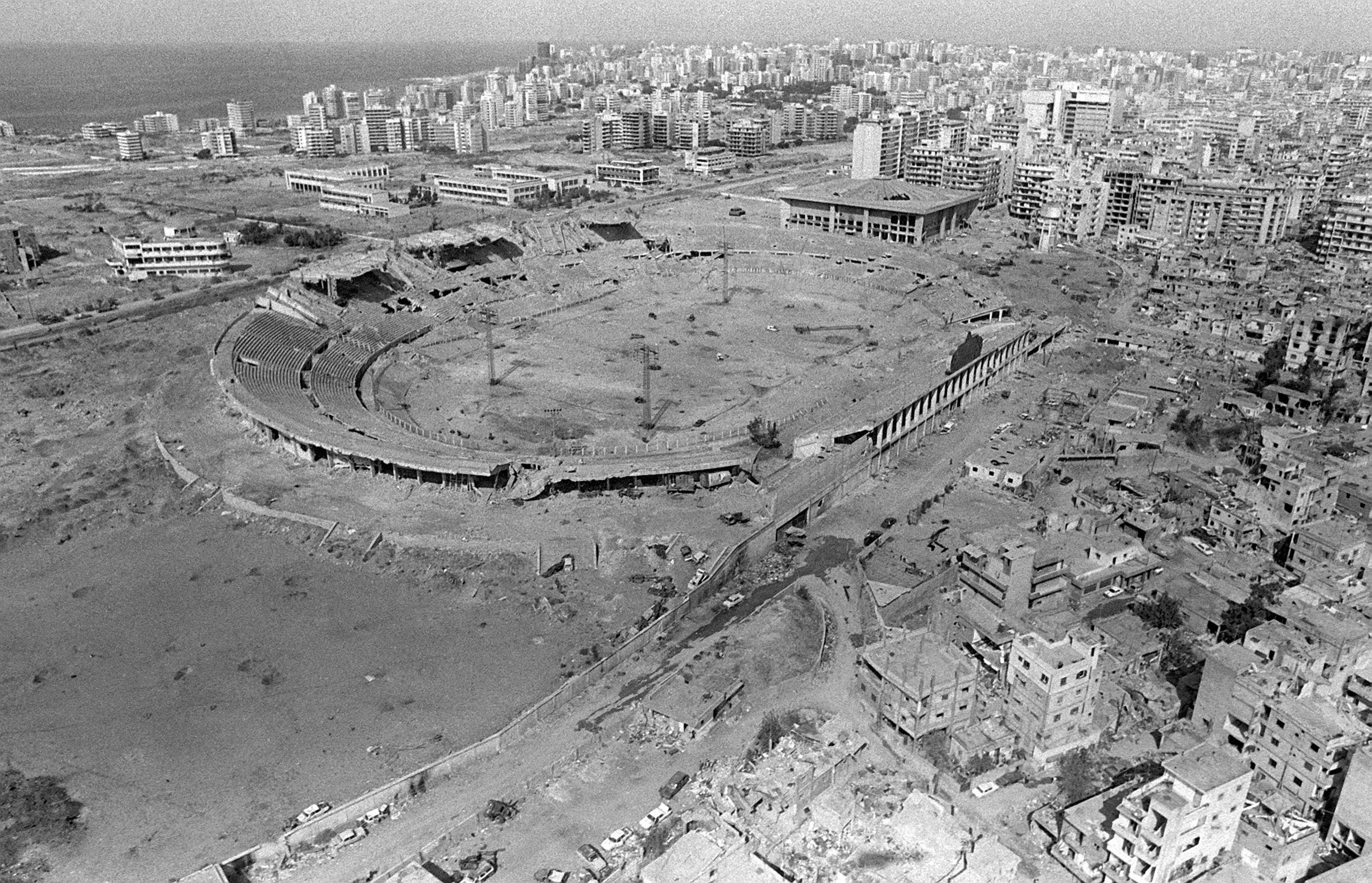
An aerial view of the stadium used as an ammunition supply site for the PLO after Israeli airstrikes in 1982

By 15 June 1982, Israeli units were entrenched outside Beirut. The United States called for PLO withdrawal from Lebanon, and Sharon began to order bombing raids of West Beirut, targeting some 16,000 PLO fedayeen who had retreated into fortified positions. Meanwhile, Arafat attempted through negotiations to salvage politically what was clearly a disaster for the PLO, an attempt which eventually succeeded once the multinational force arrived to evacuate the PLO.

==== Ceasefire negotiations by the United Nations ====
On 26 June, a UN Security Council resolution was proposed that "demands the immediate withdrawal of the Israeli forces engaged round Beirut, to a distance of 10 kilometers from the periphery of that city, as a first step towards the complete withdrawal of Israeli forces from Lebanon, and the simultaneous withdrawal of the Palestinian armed forces from Beirut, which shall retire to the existing camps".

The United States vetoed the resolution because it was "a transparent attempt to preserve the PLO as a viable political force". However, President Reagan made an impassioned plea to Prime Minister Begin to end the siege. Begin called back within minutes informing the President that he had given the order to end the attack.

Amid escalating violence and civilian casualties, Philip Habib was sent to restore order, which he accomplished on 12 August on the heels of IDF's intensive, day-long bombardment of West Beirut. The Habib-negotiated truce called for the withdrawal of both Israeli and PLO elements, as well as a multinational force composed of U.S. Marines along with French and Italian units that would ensure the departure of the PLO and protect defenseless civilians.

=== International intervention ===
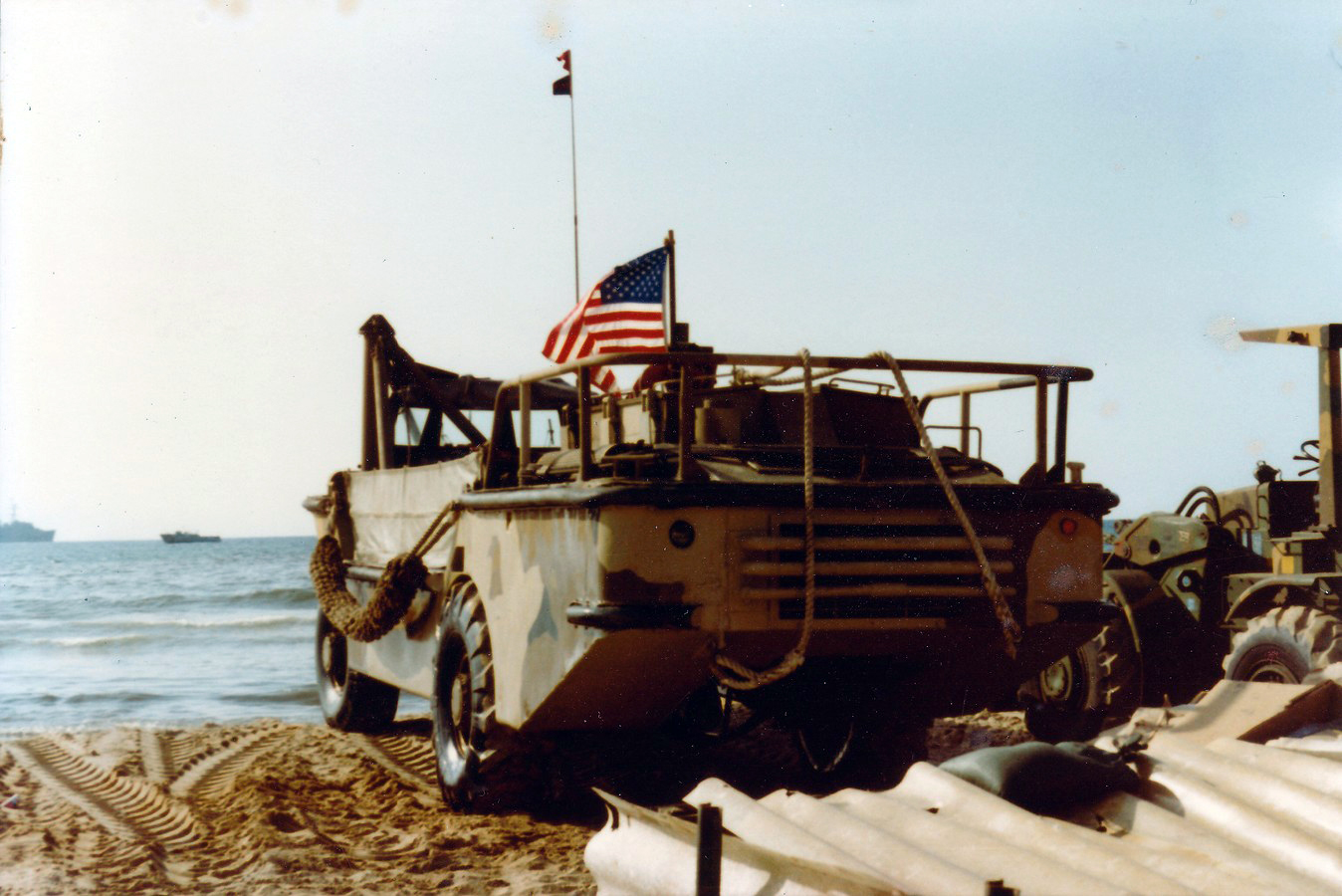
US Navy Amphibian arriving in Beirut, 1982

On 21 August 1982, the first troops of a multinational force landed in Beirut to oversee the PLO withdrawal from Lebanon. U.S. mediation resulted in the evacuation of Syrian troops and PLO fighters from Beirut. The agreement provided for the deployment of a multinational force composed of U.S. Marines along with French, Italian and British units. However, Israel reported that some 2,000 PLO militants were hiding in Palestinian refugee camps on the outskirts of Beirut.

Bachir Gemayel was elected president on 23 August. He was assassinated on 14 September by Habib Tanious Shartouni, affiliated to the Syrian Social Nationalist Party.

=== Sabra and Shatila massacre ===
On 16–18 September 1982, Lebanese Phalangists, allied with the Israeli Defense Force, killed between 460 and 3,500 Lebanese and Palestinian Shiite civilians in the Shatila refugee camp and the adjacent Sabra neighborhood of Beirut. The Israelis had ordered their Phalangist allies to clear out PLO fighters. Soldiers loyal to Phalangist leader Elie Hobeika began slaughtering civilians, while Israeli forces blocked exits from Sabra and Shatila and illuminated the area with flares. IDF officials failed to act to stop the killings, and prevented the escapees from fleeing the Phalangists and aided them later by lighting the camps during night at their request.

Ten days later, the Israeli government set up the Kahan Commission to investigate the circumstances of the Sabra and Shatila massacre. In 1983, the commission published its findings that then-Defense Minister Ariel Sharon was personally responsible for the massacre and should resign. Under pressure, Sharon resigned as defense minister but remained in the government as a minister without portfolio.

=== 17 May Agreement ===
On 17 May 1983, Lebanon's Amine Gemayel, Israel, and the United States signed an agreement on Israeli withdrawal conditioned on the departure of Syrian troops, reportedly after the US and Israel exerted severe pressure on Gemayel. The agreement stated that "the state of war between Israel and Lebanon has been terminated and no longer exists". The agreement in effect amounted to a peace agreement with Israel, and was seen by many Lebanese Muslims as an attempt for Israel to gain a permanent hold on the Lebanese South.

The 17 May Agreement was widely portrayed in the Arab world as an imposed surrender. Amine Gemayel was accused of acting as a Quisling President. Tensions in Lebanon hardened considerably. Syria strongly opposed the agreement and declined to discuss the withdrawal of its troops, effectively stalemating further progress.

=== Mountain War ===
In August 1983, Israel withdrew from the Chouf District in southeast of Beirut, removing the buffer between the Druze and the Maronite militias, and triggering another round of brutal fighting, the Mountain War. Israel did not intervene. By September 1983, the Druze had gained control over most of the Chouf, and Israeli forces had pulled out from all but the southern security zone.

In September 1983, following the Israeli withdrawal and the ensuing battles between the Lebanese Army and opposing factions for control of key terrain during the Mountain War, the Reagan White House approved the use of naval gunfire to subdue Druze and Syrian positions in order to give support to and protect the Lebanese Army, which was under severe duress.

=== Iranian involvement and founding of Hezbollah ===
In 1982, the Islamic Republic of Iran established a base in the Syrian-controlled Bekaa Valley in Lebanon. From that base, the Islamic Revolutionary Guard Corps (IRGC) "founded, financed, trained and equipped Hezbollah to operate as a proxy army" for Iran. The IRGC organized Hezbollah by drafting members from Shi'a groups resisting the Israeli occupation and from the main Shi'a movement, Nabih Berri's Amal Movement. The group found inspiration for its revolutionary Islamism in the Iranian Revolution of 1979. With Iranian sponsorship and a large pool of disaffected Shi'a refugees from which to draw support, Hezbollah quickly grew into a strong, armed force.

==== Suicide bombings against Americans and Europeans in Lebanon ====
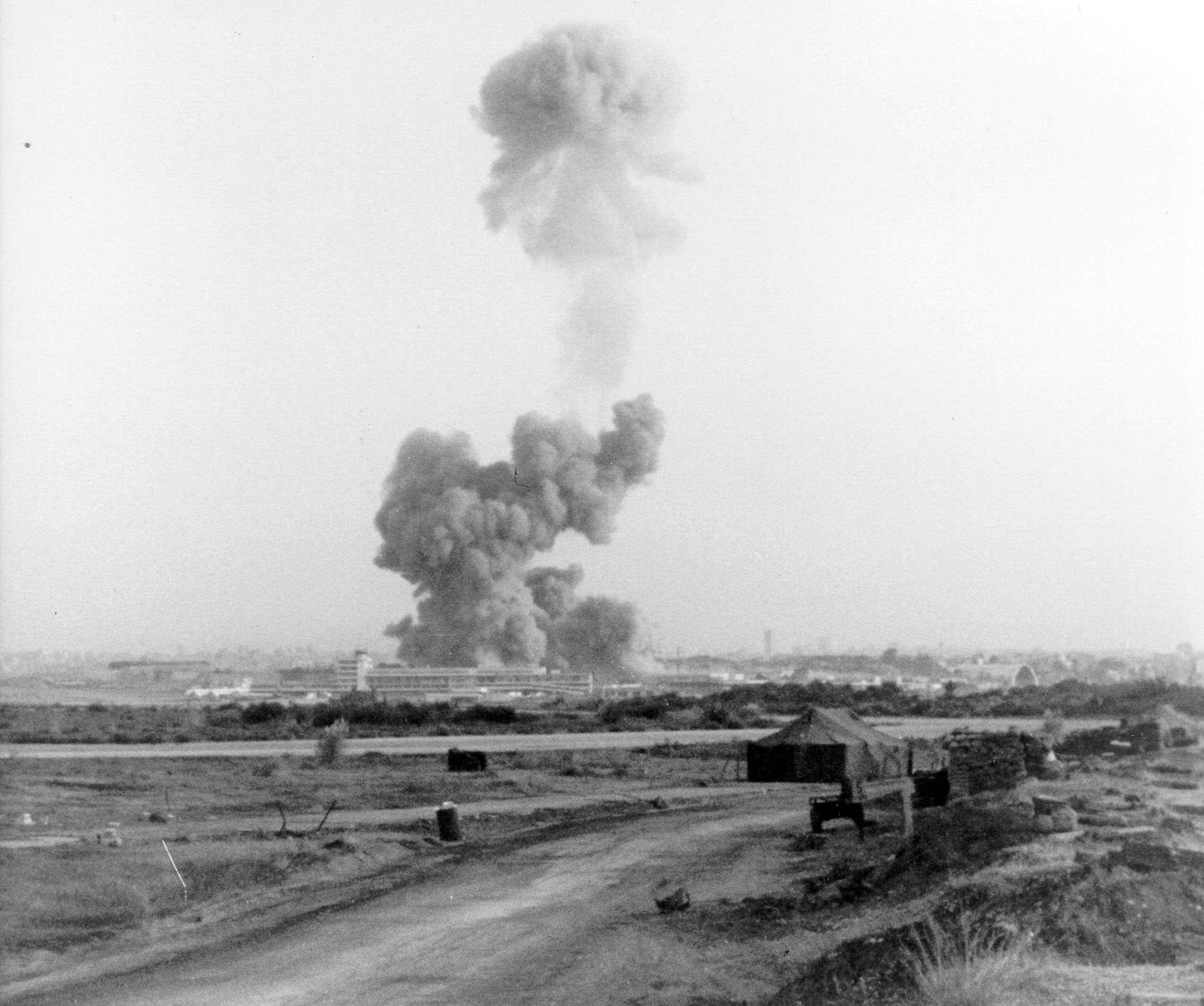
Picture of the 1983 Beirut barracks bombing

On 18 April 1983, a suicide bombing attack at the U.S. Embassy in West Beirut killed 63, beginning a series of attacks against U.S. and Western interests in Lebanon.

On 23 October 1983, a devastating Iranian-sponsored suicide bombing targeted the barracks of U.S. and French forces in Beirut, killing 241 American and 58 French servicemen. On 18 January 1984, American University of Beirut President Malcolm H. Kerr was murdered.

Anti-U.S. attacks continued even after U.S. forces withdrew, including a bombing of the U.S. embassy annex in East Beirut on 20 September 1984, which killed 24, including 2 U.S. servicemen.

On 1 July 1985, following the hijacking of a TWA aeroplane which eventually landed at Beirut airport, President Reagan issued a ban on all flights to and from Lebanon. The ban was lifted after 12 years.

=== 6 February Intifada ===
The February 6 uprising in West Beirut or the February 6 Intifada, was a battle where the parties of West Beirut, led by the Amal Movement, decisively defeated the Lebanese Army. The day started with the defection of many Muslim and Druze units to the militias, which was a major blow to the government and caused the army to virtually collapse.

==== U.S. disengagement from Lebanon ====
Following the uprising, the U.S. Marines' position in Lebanon became untenable, and they were looking ready to withdraw. Syria and Muslim groups had gained the upper hand, and stepped up pressure on Gemayel. On 5 March 1984, the Lebanese Government canceled 17 May Agreement, and the Marines departed a few weeks later.

== Fourth phase (1984–1990) ==
=== War of the Camps ===
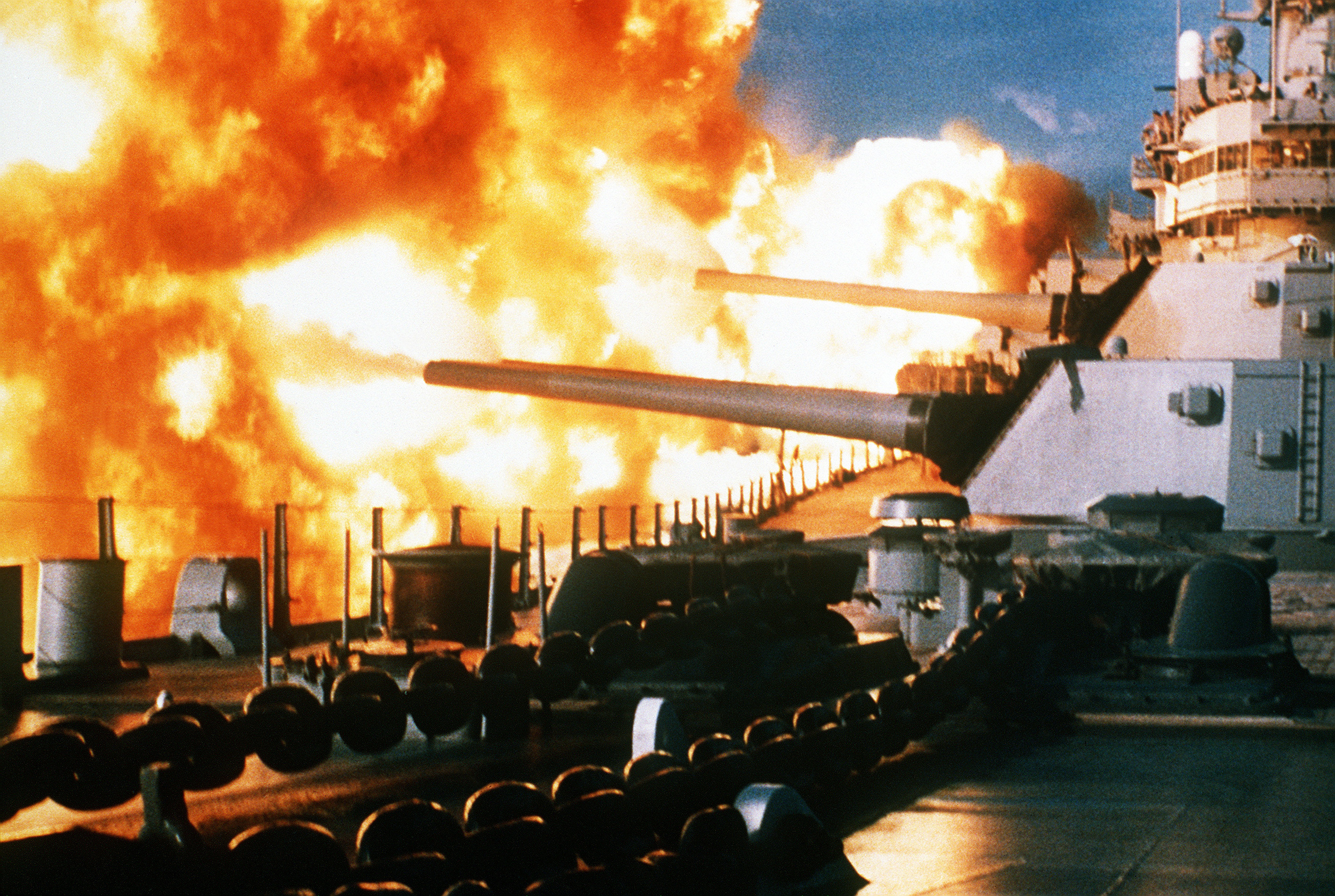
USS New Jersey fires a salvo against targets in the Shouf, 9 January 1984.

Between 1985 and 1989, sectarian conflict worsened as various efforts at national reconciliation failed. Heavy fighting took place in the War of the Camps of 1985–86 as a Syrian-backed coalition headed by the Amal militia sought to rout the PLO from their Lebanese strongholds. Many Palestinians died, and Sabra and Shatila and Bourj el-Barajneh refugee camps were largely destroyed.

On 8 March 1985, a car bomb exploded in Bir al-Abid, south Beirut, killing 80 and injuring over 400.

On 8 August 1985, a summit was held in Damascus with President Amin Gemayel, Prime Minister Rachid Karami and Syrian President Hafez al-Assad attempting to end the fighting between Christian and Druze militias. There followed a series of car bombs in Beirut which were seen as intended to thwart any agreement. On 14 August a car exploded in a Christian district control by the Lebanese Forces. On 17 August another exploded beside a supermarket, also in a district under LF control. 55 people were killed. Two days later two car bombs went off in a Druze and a Shi'ite district of Beirut. The following day another car bomb exploded in Tripoli. An unknown group, the "Black Brigades", claimed responsibility.

The violence escalated with extensive artillery exchanges. It is estimated that in two weeks 300 people were killed. On 15 September, fighting broke out in Tripoli between Alawite and Sunni militias. 200,000 people fled the city. The harbour district was heavily bombarded. The arrival of the Syrian army a week later ended the violence which left 500 killed.

In late December 1985 an agreement was reached between the Syrians and their Lebanese allies to stabilise the situation in Lebanon. It was opposed by President Amin Gemayel and the Phalangist Party. On 15 January 1986 the pro-Syrian leader of the Lebanese Forces, Elie Hobeika, was overthrown. On 21 January, a car bomb killed 20 people in Furn ash-Shebbak, East Beirut. Over the next 10 days a further 5 smaller explosions occurred close to Phalagist targets.

In April 1986, following American airstrikes on Libya, three western hostages were executed and a new round of hostage taking started.

Major combat returned to Beirut in 1987, when Palestinians, leftists, and Druze fighters allied against Amal, eventually drawing further Syrian intervention. On 22 February 1987, eight thousand Syrian soldiers entered West Beirut to separate the rival militias. In the Shia district twenty-three men and four women were taken from a place of worship and shot and bayoneted to death. A crowd of fifty thousand attended their funeral with calls for revenge. Ayatollah Khomeini issued a fatwa forbidding attacks on Syrian forces.

=== War of Brothers ===
In 1988, Violent confrontations flared up again in Shiite areas between Amal and Hezbollah. In early May, Hezbollah launched a large-scale attack on Amal positions in the southern Beirut suburbs of Dahieh, and by 11 May seized 80% of the suburbs, emerging for the first time as a strong force in the capital.

On 2 January 1989, clashes erupted in Iqlim al-Tuffah in Southern Lebanon between the two sides without any significant territorial changes. Clashes re-erupted in December 1989 in Iqlim al-Tuffah, in which more than 3,500 Amal and Palestinian fighters clashed with 2,000 Hezbollah fighters in the region.

Most of the fighting toned down by 28 December. Minor skirmishes took place later in 1990, but completely stopped by November 1990.

=== Iraqi support for Christian anti-Shia factions ===
Meanwhile, Prime Minister Rashid Karami, head of a government of national unity set up after the failed peace efforts of 1984, was assassinated on 1 June 1987. The assassination was accused on Samir Geagea in coordination with the Lebanese army, but the charge could not be proven. President Gemayel's term of office expired in September 1988. Before stepping down, he appointed another Maronite Christian, Lebanese Armed Forces Commanding General Michel Aoun, as acting Prime Minister, contravening the National Pact.

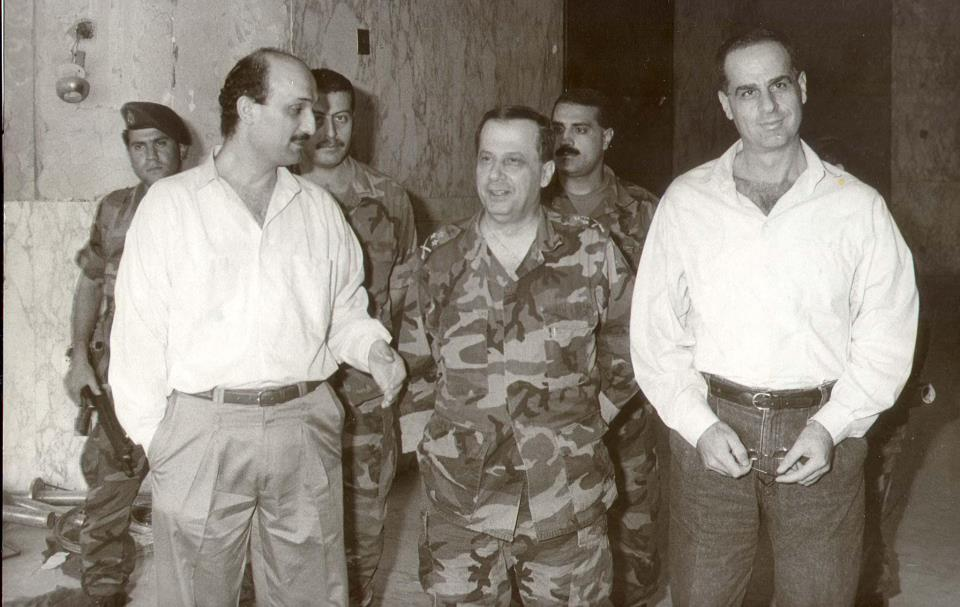
Samir Geagea (Chairman of the Lebanese Forces), Michel Aoun (Prime Minister of the military cabinet) and Georges Adwan (Vice Chairman of the Lebanese Forces) meet in Baabda Palace. 10 November 1989

Conflict in this period was exacerbated by increasing Iraqi involvement, as Saddam Hussein searched for proxy battlefields for the Iran–Iraq War. To counter Iran's influence through Amal and Hezbollah, Iraq backed Maronite groups. Saddam Hussein helped Aoun and the Lebanese Forces led by Samir Geagea between 1988 and 1990.

Muslim groups rejected the violation of the National Pact and pledged support to Selim al-Hoss, a Sunni who had succeeded Karami. Lebanon was thus divided between a Maronite military government in East Beirut and a civilian government in West Beirut.

On 8 March 1989 Aoun started the blockade of illegal ports of Muslim militias. This touched off bloody exchanges of artillery fire that lasted for half a year. Six days later he launched what he termed a "war of liberation" against the Syrians and their Lebanese militia allies. As a result, Syrian pressure on his Lebanese Army and militia pockets in East Beirut grew. Still, Aoun persisted in the "war of liberation", denouncing the government of Hafez al-Assad and claiming that he fought for Lebanon's independence.

While he seems to have had significant Maronite support for this, he was still perceived as a sectarian leader among others by the Muslim population, who distrusted his agenda. He was also plagued by the challenge to his legitimacy put forth by the Syrian-backed West Beirut government of Selim al-Hoss. Militarily, this war did not achieve its goal, and instead caused considerable damage to East Beirut and provoked massive emigration among the Christian population.

=== Taif Agreement of 1989 ===
The Taif Agreement of 1989 marked the beginning of the end of the fighting. In January 1989, a committee appointed by the Arab League, chaired by Kuwait and including Saudi Arabia, Algeria, and Morocco, began to formulate solutions to the conflict. This led to a meeting of Lebanese parliamentarians in Ta'if, Saudi Arabia, where they agreed to the national reconciliation accord in October. The agreement provided a large role for Syria in Lebanese affairs. Returning to Lebanon, they ratified the agreement on 4 November and elected Rene Mouawad as president the following day. Military leader Michel Aoun in East Beirut refused to accept Mouawad, and denounced the Taif Agreement.

Mouawad was assassinated 17 days later in a car bombing in Beirut on 22 November as his motorcade returned from Lebanese independence day ceremonies. He was succeeded by Elias Hrawi, who remained in office until 1998. Aoun again refused to accept the election, and dissolved Parliament.

=== Infighting in East Beirut ===
On 16 January 1990, General Aoun ordered all Lebanese media to cease using terms like "President" or "Minister" to describe Hrawi and other participants in the Taif government. The Lebanese Forces (LF), led by Samir Geagea, which had grown into a rival power broker in the Christian East Beirut, responded by suspending all its broadcasts. Tension with the LF grew, as Aoun feared that the militia was planning to link up with the Hrawi administration.

On 31 January 1990, Lebanese Army forces loyal to Aoun attacked the LF positions in East Beirut, after Aoun had stated that it was in the national interest for the government to "unify the weapons", i.e. that the LF must submit to his authority as acting head of state. The fighting continued until 8 March when Aoun announced a unilateral ceasefire and called for negotiations. During this period East Beirut saw levels of destruction and casualties that it had not experienced during the entire 15 years of civil war. Aoun's forces had made no significant inroads on the areas under Geagea's control.

In August 1990, the Lebanese Parliament, which did not heed Aoun's order to dissolve, and the new president agreed on constitutional amendments embodying some of the political reforms envisioned at Taif. The National Assembly expanded to 128 seats and was for the first time divided equally between Christians and Muslims.

As Saddam Hussein focused his attention on Kuwait, Iraqi supplies to Aoun dwindled.

On 13 October 1990, Syria launched a major operation involving its army, air force (for the first time since Zahle's siege in 1981) and Lebanese allies (mainly the Lebanese Army led by General Émile Lahoud) against Aoun's stronghold around the presidential palace, where hundreds of Aoun supporters were killed. It cleared out the last Aounist pockets, cementing its hold on the capital. Aoun fled to the French Embassy in Beirut, and later into exile in Paris. He was not able to return until May 2005.

William Harris claims that the Syrian operation could not take place until Syria had reached an agreement with the United States, that in exchange for support against the Iraqi government of Saddam Hussein in the Gulf War, it would convince Israel not to attack Syrian aircraft approaching Beirut. Aoun claimed in 1990 that the United States "has sold Lebanon to Syria".

=== Lebanon's amnesty law and Hezbollah's hegemony ===
In March 1991, parliament passed an amnesty law that pardoned all political crimes prior to its enactment. The amnesty was not extended to crimes perpetrated against foreign diplomats or certain crimes referred by the cabinet to the Higher Judicial Council. In May 1991, the militias, with the important exception of Hezbollah, were dissolved, and the Lebanese Armed Forces began to slowly rebuild themselves as Lebanon's only major non-sectarian institution.

Some violence still occurred. In late December 1991 a car bomb, estimated at 220 pounds of TNT, exploded in the Muslim neighborhood of Basta. At least thirty people were killed, and 120 wounded, including former Prime Minister Shafik Wazzan, who was riding in a bulletproof car.

== Aftermath ==
=== Post-conflict Syrian occupation ===
The post-war occupation of the country by the Syrian Arab Republic was particularly politically disadvantageous to the Maronite population, as most of their leadership was driven into exile, or had been assassinated or jailed.

In 2005, the assassination of Rafik Hariri sparked the Cedar Revolution leading to Syrian military withdrawal from the country. Contemporary political alliances in Lebanon reflect the alliances of the Civil War as well as contemporary geopolitics. The March 14 Alliance brings together Maronite-dominated parties (Lebanese Forces, Kataeb, National Liberal Party, National Bloc, Independence Movement) and Sunni-dominated parties (Future Movement, Islamic Group) whereas the March 8 Alliance is led by the Shia-dominated Hezbollah and Amal parties, as well as assorted Maronite- and Sunni-dominated parties, the SSNP, Ba'athist and Nasserist parties. The Syrian civil war is also having a significant impact on contemporary political life.

=== Long-term effects ===
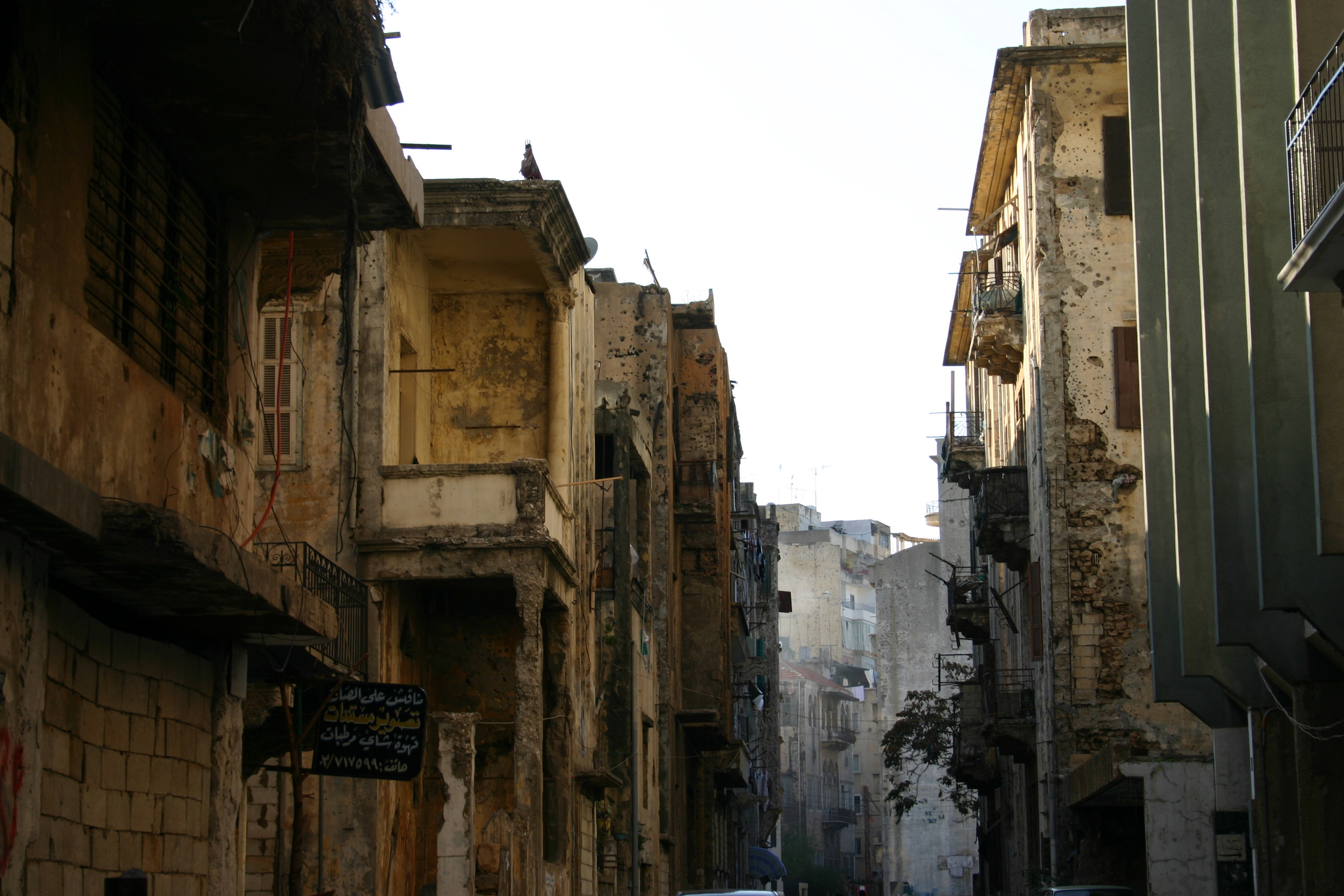
War-damaged buildings still standing in Beirut, 2006

Since the end of the war, the Lebanese have conducted several elections, most of the militias have been weakened or disbanded, and the Lebanese Armed Forces (LAF) have extended central government authority over about two-thirds of the country. Following the cease-fire which ended 12 July 2006 Israeli-Lebanese conflict, the army has for the first time in over three decades moved to occupy and control the southern areas of Lebanon.

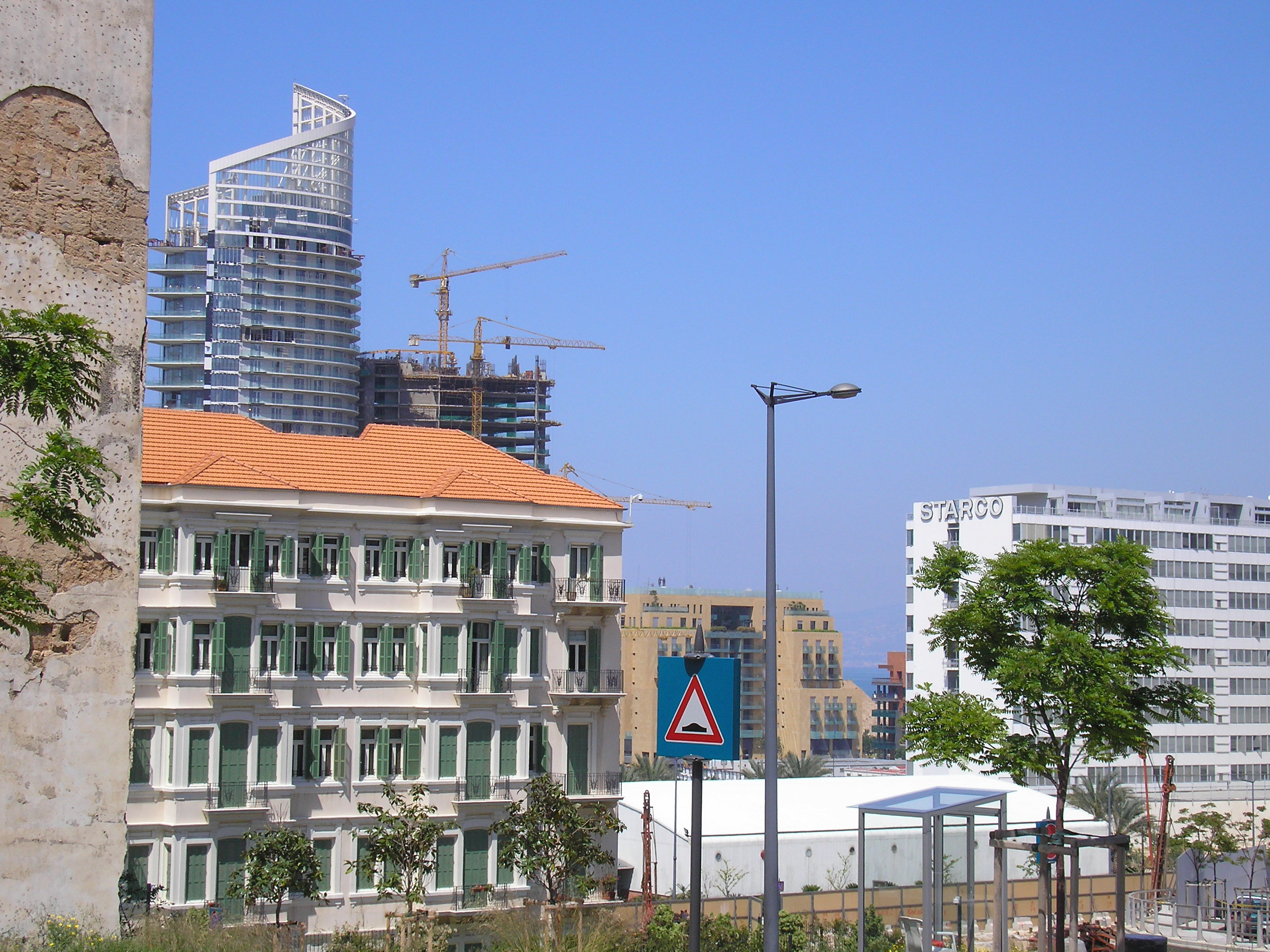
Since 1990, Lebanon has undergone a thorough re-constructive process, in which the Downtown of Beirut was fully restructured according to international standards

== Casualties ==
It is estimated that around 150,000 people were killed, and another 100,000 permanently handicapped. In 1989, AP reported 150,000 dead over fourteen and a half years. Reuters gave a figure of 140,000. These figures, equating to 200 killed/week for fourteen years, are much higher than official figures of 35–40,000 dead.

Approximately 900,000 people, representing one-fifth of the pre-war population, were displaced from their homes. Perhaps a quarter of a million emigrated permanently.

=== Landmines and forced disappearances ===
Thousands of land mines remain buried in the previously contested areas. Some Western hostages kidnapped during the mid-1980s were held until June 1992. Lebanese victims of kidnapping and wartime "disappeared" number in the tens of thousands.

In the 15 years of strife, there were at least 3,641 car bombs, which left 4,386 people dead and thousands more injured.

== "Lebanonization" ==
Lebanonization is a pejorative political term, first used by Israeli president Shimon Peres in 1983, referring to Israeli minimization of its presence in Lebanon following the 1982 Israeli invasion of Lebanon, meaning the process of a country degenerating into a civil war or failed state in reference to the civil war.

== In popular culture ==
- The British synthpop band The Human League released "The Lebanon", a track about the Lebanese Civil war, and in particular the Sabra and Shatila massacre, in April 1984.
- English rock band Genesis' 1986 song "Domino" describes the experiences of a man observing the war from a hotel room in Beirut; the titular dominoes act as metaphors for bombs falling on the Lebanese capital.
- The Argentinean rock/new wave band GIT wrote and recorded a song, in 1986, called "Buenas noches, Beirut" ("Good Night, Beirut"), about the Lebanese Civil War, include on their third eponymous studio album.
- Out of Life by Maroun Baghdadi, from 1991, was awarded the Jury Prize at the 1991 Cannes Film Festival.
- In 2009, Saleh Barakat curated "The Road to Peace" exhibition at Beirut Art Center. The exhibition featured paintings, photographs, drawings, prints and sculptures by Lebanese artists during the war. Its title comes from a series of prints by Aref Rayess that depict Lebanese survivors of war.
- Waltz with Bashir, a movie from 2008 that deals with the 1982 Israeli intervention and the Sabra and Shatila massacre.
- The 2010 Canadian film Incendies depicts the civil war and its aftermath. It is partly based on incidents in the life of the Lebanese writer Souha Bechara.
- 1995 children's book, From Far Away by Robert Munsch, is based on a true story of a family of asylum seekers to Canada, from the perspective of a girl who does not speak English and is unfamiliar with Western culture and customs, although the conflict is not specifically indicated, it is heavily implied.
- The war is the subject of Nabil Kanso's paintings The Vortices of Wrath, Lebanon, Endless Night, and Lebanon Summer 1982.
- The 2021 Lebanese-Canadian film Memory Box is based on co-director Joana Hadjithomas' notebooks and tapes made when she was a teenager in Beirut during the civil war in the 1980s.
- Beirut is a 2018 American political thriller film set in 1982 during the Lebanese Civil War.
- Witness is a 2025 musical album by string quartet Kronos Quartet performing music by Mary Kouyoumdjian in which the war is the subject of several pieces, including the three piece suite named "Bombs of Beirut"

== See also ==
- History of Lebanon
- Palestinian insurgency in South Lebanon
- Israeli occupation of Lebanon
- Syrian occupation of Lebanon
- List of extrajudicial killings and political violence in Lebanon
- List of modern conflicts in the Middle East
- Al-Fajr Forces
