= Terrorism in Lebanon =

Historical chronology of acts of terrorism

Terrorism in Lebanon refers to the acts of terrorism that have occurred in Lebanon through various phases of its history. According to the U.S. Country Reports on Terrorism in 2016 and 2017, Lebanon is considered a terrorist safe haven. Terrorist organizations operating in Lebanon include Hezbollah, Palestinian militias, and other radical Sunni Muslim organizations. The government was reported to not be in control of "all regions" of the country which includes many refugee camps and its borders with Israel and Syria.

Some of the deadliest terror attacks involved Anti Western motives, which peaked during the Lebanese Civil War, where militias would target diplomatic missions, namely from the United States and France. Hezbollah also conducted and plotted many attacks and hijackings globally under many aliases in which they targeted Jews, Americans, Europeans and the Gulf states.

Lebanon has become a battleground in the broader regional proxy wars between Iran and its adversaries, including Israel and the United States. Hezbollah's actions in Syria and its support for Hamas in Gaza are part of Iran's strategy to expand its influence and counterbalance Israeli and Western interests. The instability in Syria has had a significant destabilizing impact on Lebanon's security situation. Islamist groups have sought to exploit and deepen sectarian divisions in Lebanon, particularly between Sunnis and Shias. Hezbollah's involvement in the Syrian civil war on the side of the Assad regime has angered some Sunni groups prompting numerous attacks against Iranian and Hezbollah targets.

== Lebanese definition of terrorism ==
The Lebanese state defines terrorism through Article 314 of its Criminal Code, which states that "Terrorist acts are all acts intended to cause a state of terror and committed by means liable to create a public danger such as explosive devices, inflammable materials, toxic or corrosive products and infectious or microbial agents." The UN Special Tribunal for Lebanon's Appeals Chamber has criticized this interpretation, arguing that the list in Article 314 should be viewed as illustrative rather than exhaustive.

== Islamic extremism ==
During the Lebanese Civil War, the Islamist Islamic Unification Movement (Tawheed) militiamen were responsible for several acts of violence in Tripoli against the local cells of the Alawite ADP and LCP. In October 1983, the IUM/Tawheed executed a series of terrorist attacks against the Tripoli offices of the Communist Party, targeting Party cadres and their families. In one occasion, Tawheed fighters rounded up some 52 top Communist members, forced them to renounce their atheism and then summarily shot them, dumping the victims' bodies into the Mediterranean.

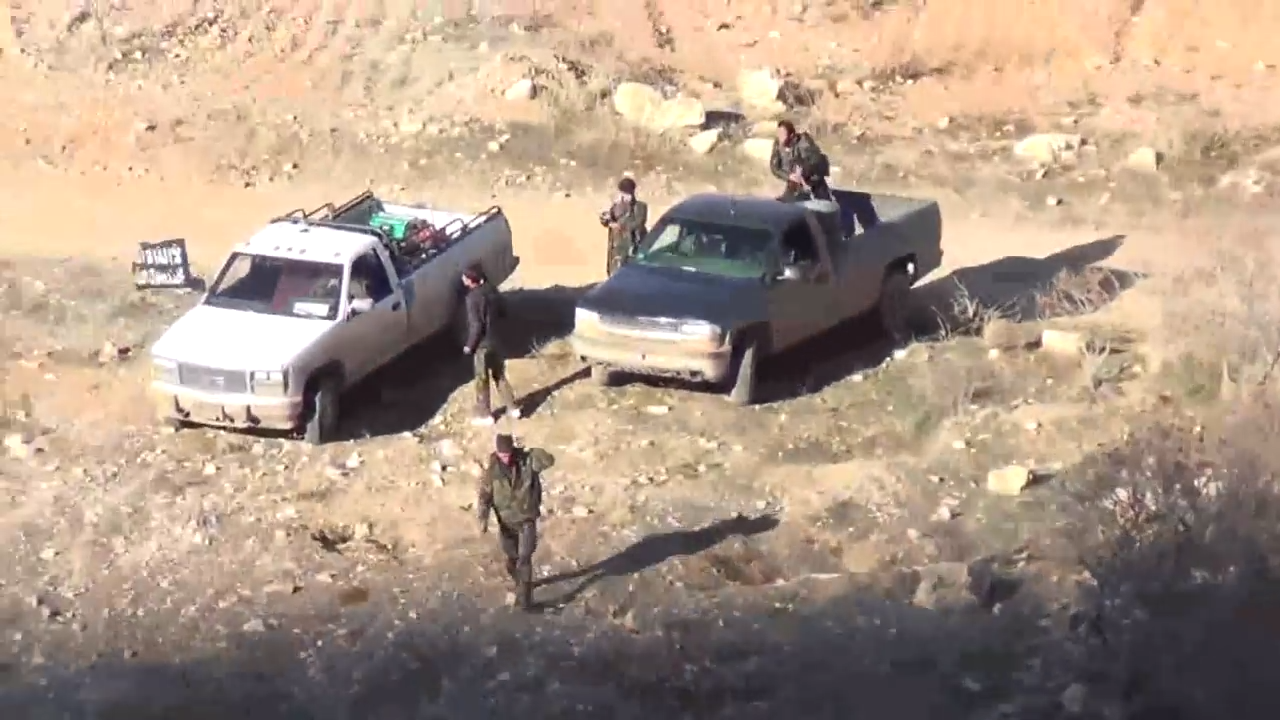
Fatah al-Islam fighters in the Qalamoun Mountains in February 2013

Fatah al-Islam is an Islamist group operating out of the Nahr al-Bared refugee camp in northern Lebanon. It was formed in November 2006, by fighters who broke off from the pro-Syrian Fatah al-Intifada, itself a splinter group of the Palestinian Fatah movement, and is led by a Palestinian fugitive militant named Shaker al-Abssi. The group's members have been described as militant jihadists, and the group itself has been described as a terrorist movement that draws inspiration from al-Qaeda. Its stated goal is to reform the Palestinian refugee camps under Islamic sharia law, and its primary targets are the Lebanese authorities, Israel and the United States. On 21 June 2007, Lebanese State Prosecutor Saeed Mirza filed criminal charges against 16 Fatah al-Islam members accused of carrying out bombings against two civilian buses that killed two people and injured 21 others near Ain Alaq, a Lebanese mountain village.

Many Islamist militias have taken base in the Ain el Hilweh refugee camp. Because Lebanese Armed Forces are not allowed to enter the camp, Ain al-Hilweh has been called a "zone of unlaw" by the Lebanese media. Many people wanted by the Lebanese government are believed to have taken refuge in the camp as a result of the lack of Lebanese authority.

The Abdallah Azzam Brigades was formed by the Saudi national Saleh Al-Qaraawi in 2009 as an offshoot of al-Qaeda in Iraq, and was tasked with hitting targets in the Levant and throughout the Middle East. Qaraawi is a Saudi citizen and is on the list of 85 most-wanted terrorists that was issued by the Saudi Interior Ministry in 2009. An improvised device blasts outside of the Fakhereddine Army Barracks in Beirut, leaving one soldier wounded. A man claiming to be a member of Al-Qaida called the Lebanese newspaper Al Balad and claimed responsibility for the attack before and after the blasts. During 2013, the group start a string of attacks in 2013. On 19 November 2013, the Brigade claimed responsibility for a double suicide bombing outside the Iranian embassy in Beirut, which killed at least 23 people and wounded over 140. The group said the bombing was retaliation for Iranian support of Hezbollah, which fights on the Syrian government's side in the current Syrian civil war, and warned of further attacks should Iran's government not acquiesce. On 23 December the Abdullah Azzam Brigades claimed a rocket attack in Hermel, Lebanon.

=== Shia-Sunni violence ===
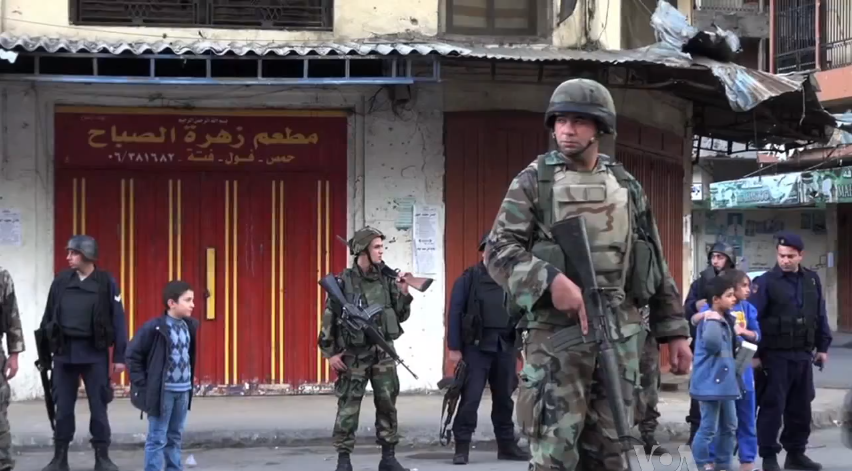
Lebanese Army patrolling in Tripoli during clashes between Alawites and Sunni neighborhoods.

Because it is a Sunni stronghold, all major currents of Lebanese Sunni Islamism have been centered in Tripoli. Black banners decorated with extracts from the Quran are prevalent and larger numbers of women are taking up the niqab. Nearly half of the Alawites of Lebanon live in the Jabal Mohsen neighborhood of Tripoli and nearby villages in Akkar, north Lebanon. The Bab al-Tabbaneh–Jabal Mohsen conflict was a recurring conflict between the Sunni Muslim residents of the Bab-al-Tabbaneh neighborhood and the Alawite residents of the Jabal Mohsen neighborhood of Tripoli, Lebanon from 1976 through 2015. Residents of the two neighborhoods became rivals during the Lebanese Civil War and frequently engaged in violence. Residents were divided along sectarian lines and by their opposition to or support of the Alawite-led Syrian government.

On 23 August 2013 two mosques were bombed in Tripoli, Lebanon. 47 people were killed and five hundred more injured in what has been called the "biggest and deadliest" bombing in Tripoli since the end of Lebanon's Civil War. Although nobody has claimed responsibility, it was perceived as an attack on the Lebanese Sunni community, with residents blaming Bashar al-Assad and Hezbollah. On 10 January 2015, nine people were killed and more than 30 wounded when two suicide bombers blew themselves up in a crowded café in Jabal Mohsen, Tripoli, Lebanon. The al-Qaeda affiliated terrorist group Nusra Front took responsibility for the attacks that targeted the Alawite area.

Between 2011 and 2017, fighting from the Syrian civil war spilled over into Lebanon as opponents and supporters of the Syrian Arab Republic traveled to Lebanon to fight and attack each other on Lebanese soil. The Syrian conflict stoked a resurgence of sectarian violence in Lebanon, with many of Lebanon's Sunni Muslims supporting the rebels in Syria, while many of Lebanon's Shi'a Muslims supporting the Ba'athist government of Bashar al-Assad, whose Alawite minority is usually described as a heterodox offshoot of Shi'ism. Killings, unrest and sectarian kidnappings across Lebanon resulted.

The Free Sunnis of Baalbek Brigade, also known as the Ahrar al-Sunna Baalbek Brigade, was a Sunni jihadist group active in Lebanon. It first rose to prominence in November 2013 when it retaliated against the Shia Islamist group Hezbollah, after clashes between locals Sunnis in Baalbek and members of Hezbollah. The group is known for attacking the Iranian embassy in Beirut in 2013 and attacking Christian churches. On 30 June 2014, the group pledged its allegiance to the Islamic State of Iraq and the Levant (ISIL).

On 12 November 2015, two suicide bombers detonated explosives in Bourj el-Barajneh, a southern suburb of Beirut, Lebanon, that is inhabited mostly by Shia Muslims. Reports of the number of fatalities concluded that 43 people died directly from the detonation. Islamic State of Iraq and the Levant (ISIL) claimed responsibility for the attacks.

== Left-wing and anti-western terrorism ==
The ASALA was a Marxist Armenian Nationalist group founded in 1975 in Beirut, Lebanon during the Lebanese Civil War. ASALA, trained in the Beirut camps of the Palestine Liberation Organization, is the best known of the guerrilla groups responsible for assassinations of at least 36 Turkish diplomats. Out of the 84 recorded attacks by ASALA, 10 of them occurred in Beirut, Lebanon.

In 1971, the Japanese Red Army, led by Fusako Shigenobu, established its base of operations in Lebanon after breaking away from the Japanese Communist League-Red Army Faction in Japan. The JRA allied with the Popular Front for the Liberation of Palestine (PFLP) and received funding, training, and weaponry from the group. This alliance allowed the JRA to carry out attacks worldwide in support of the Palestinian cause.

Between March and August 1977 a series of massacres on Christian civilians took place in the Chouf region during the Lebanese Civil War. The massacres were mostly committed by Druze gunmen of the People's Liberation Army after the assassination of Druze leader Kamal Jumblatt. Many victims were mutilated and women were reportedly sexually abused. On 16 March 1977, the PSP leader Kamal Jumblatt was ambushed and killed in his car near Baakline in the Chouf by unidentified gunmen (allegedly, fighters from the pro-Syrian faction of the Syrian Social Nationalist Party, acting in collusion with the Syrian military commander of the Mount Lebanon region, Colonel Ibrahim Houeijy); believing that the perpetrators were members of the predominately Christian Phalangist Kataeb Regulatory Forces (KRF) or Tigers Militias, PLF militiamen extracted swift retribution on the local Maronite population living in the intermixed towns and villages around Baakline. Despite the hasty dispatch on 17 March of 4,000 Syrian Army troops from the Arab Deterrent Force (ADF) to keep the peace in the Chouf, it is estimated that about 177–250 Maronite villagers were killed in reprisal actions at the towns of Moukhtara and Barouk, and at the villages of Mazraat el-Chouf, Maaser el-Chouf, Botmeh, Kfar Nabrakh, Machghara and Brih (St George's Church attack).

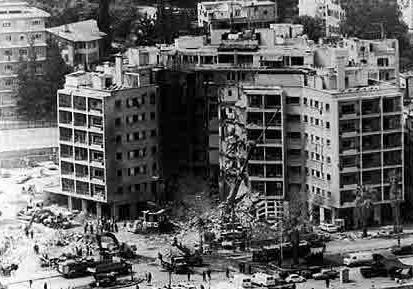
Aftermath of the United States embassy bombing in Beirut

In 1983 Hezbollah engaged in three attacks against foreign missions in Lebanon. On 18 April, a suicide car bomber stole a van carrying 2,000 pounds of explosives and slammed into the U.S. Embassy killing 63 people including 18 Americans. On 23 October, a suicide car bomber in a truck carrying 2500 pounds of explosives crashed through the gates of a US Marine barracks killing 241 American servicemen and wounding 81. 58 French troops from the multinational force are also killed in a separate attack. On 4 November, a suicide bomber drove a pickup truck filled with explosives into a Shin Bet building at an IDF base in Tyre. The explosion killed 28 Israelis and 32 Lebanese prisoners, and wounded about 40 others.

Malcolm H. Kerr, president of the American University in Beirut (AUB), was assassinated near his office. He had replaced AUB president David Dodge, who was kidnapped six months earlier. A telephone message claiming to represent Islamic Jihad proclaimed: "We are responsible of the assassination of the president of AUB ... We also vow that not a single American or French will remain on this soil. We shall take no different course. And we shall not waver."

It is estimated that between 31 August and 13 September 1983, Jumblatt's Socialist People's Liberation Army overran thirty-two villages, killing 1,500 people and driving another 50,000 out of their homes in the mountainous areas east and west of Beirut. In retaliation, some 127 Druze civilians were killed by LF militiamen between 5–7 September at the Shahhar region, Kfarmatta, Al-Bennay, Ain Ksour, and Abey, where the LF also desecrated the tomb of a prominent Druze religious man. In total, these "tit-for-tat" killings ultimately led to the displacement of 20,000 Druze and 163,670 Christian villagers from the Chouf,

The Lebanese Armed Revolutionary Factions (LARF) was a small Marxist–Leninist urban guerrilla group which played an active role in the Lebanese Civil War between 1979 and 1988. Between 1982 and 1987 they were held responsible for 18 bombings, political assassinations, and kidnappings targeting French, American and Israeli officials in both Lebanon and Western Europe. These include the assassinations in Paris of the assistant US military Attaché to the American embassy, Lieutenant colonel Charles R. Ray on January 18, 1982, followed on 3 April of that year by the Israeli diplomat Yaakov Barsimantov. The LARF was also allegedly behind the assassination of US citizen Leamon Hunt, the director of the multinational observer force in the Sinai on February 15, 1984, in Rome, as well as a failed attempt on March 24, 1984, on the US Consul-General in Strasbourg, Robert O. Homme,

=== Palestinian political violence ===
In the aftermath of Black September in Jordan, many Palestinians arrived in Lebanon, among them Yasser Arafat and the Palestinian Liberation Organization (PLO). In the early 1970s their presence exacerbated an already tense situation in Lebanon, and in 1975 the Lebanese Civil War broke out. After Black September, the PLO and its offshoots waged an international campaign against Israelis. Notable events were the Munich Olympics massacre (1972), the hijacking of several civilian airliners, the Savoy Hotel attack, the Zion Square explosive refrigerator and the Coastal Road massacre. During the 1970s and the early 1980s, Israel suffered attacks from PLO bases in Lebanon, such as the Avivim school bus massacre in 1970, the Maalot massacre in 1974 (where Palestinian militants massacred 21 school children) and the Nahariya attack led by Samir Kuntar in 1979, as well as a terrorist bombing by Ziad Abu Ein that killed two Israeli 16-year-olds and left 36 other youths wounded during the Lag BaOmer celebration in Tiberias.

In Lebanon, the PLO aggressively took control of Lebanese towns were militants attacked Christian civilians. In October 1976 in Aishiya, Lebanon, more than 70 Lebanese Christian civilians, including at least 7 under the age of 16, were killed the Syrian backed Palestinian factions Fatah and As-Sa'iqa during the Lebanese Civil War. Four people were reported to be executed and one was burned alive. The village was depopulated and used as Palestine Liberation Organization base of operation.

On 20 January, under the command of Fatah and as-Sa'iqa, members of the Palestine Liberation Organization and leftist Muslim Lebanese militiamen entered Damour. Along with twenty Phalangist militiamen, civilians - including women, the elderly, and children, and often comprising whole families - were lined up against the walls of their homes and sprayed with machine-gun fire by Palestinians; the Palestinians then systematically dynamited and burned these homes. Several of the town's young women were separated from other civilians and gang-raped. Most estimates of the number killed range from 150 to 250, with the overwhelming majority of these being civilians; Robert Fisk puts the number of civilians massacred at nearly 250, while Israeli professor Mordechai Nisan claims a significantly higher figure of 582.

== Right-wing terrorism ==
On January 18, 1976, early in the Lebanese Civil War, the Muslim-inhabited district of La Quarantine was attacked by the right-wing Lebanese Front. According to then-The Washington Post-correspondent Jonathan Randal: "Many Muslim men and boys were rounded up and separated from the women and children and massacred; while many of the women and young girls were violently raped and murdered."

The Sabra and Shatila massacre was the 16–18 September 1982 killing of between 700 and 3,500 civilians—mostly Palestinians and Lebanese Shias—in the city of Beirut during the Lebanese Civil War. It was perpetrated by the Lebanese Forces, one of the main Christian militias in Lebanon, and supported by the Israel Defense Forces (IDF) that had surrounded Beirut's Sabra neighbourhood and the adjacent Shatila refugee camp. On 16 December 1982, the United Nations General Assembly condemned the massacre and declared it to be an act of genocide.

== Narcoterrorism ==
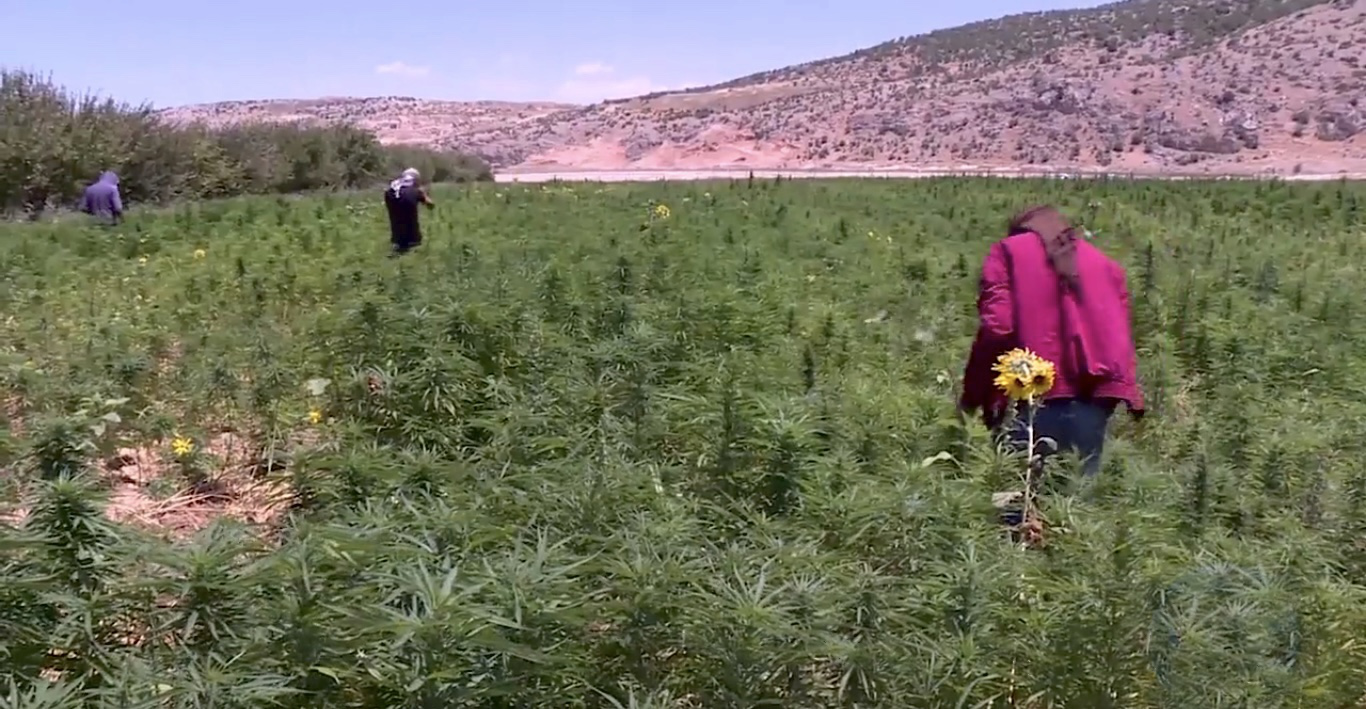
Farmers harvesting marijuana in Hezbollah controlled Bekaa valley

In 2008, U.S. authorities arrested Hezbollah operatives in the U.S. and Colombia who were involved in a scheme to launder drug money through used car sales. It was known later as Project Cassandra. Chekri Mahmoud Harb is a Lebanese national with ties to Hezbollah and the Medellin Cartel. He is known for his involvement in international drug trafficking and money laundering operations, which have helped fund Hezbollah's activities. He is a Specially Designated Narcotics Trafficker by the U.S. Treasury Department under the Kingpin Act. Intelligence reports indicated that Harb's operations allowed Hezbollah to launder hundreds of millions of dollars, mixing drug money with the proceeds of legitimate businesses. These funds helped the organization finance its operations despite international sanctions targeting the group. U.S. officials believe Hezbollah began turning to global criminal enterprises such as drug trafficking to offset declining financial support from Iran, which had been impacted by economic sanctions. "The ability of terror groups like Hezbollah to tap into worldwide criminal funding streams is the new post-9/11 challenge," said Derek Maltz, the DEA official who oversaw the agency's investigation into the Lebanese Canadian Bank.

In 2012 United States politician Sue Myrick claimed that mounting evidence of Hezbollah presence in Mexico was ignored by the Department of Homeland Security. These groups became more visible by 2010, when the Tucson Police Department reported International Terrorism Situational Awareness for Hezbollah in Mexico, noting the arrest of Jameel Nasar in Tijuana. Nasar had tried to form a Hezbollah network in Mexico and South America. A report from the US House Homeland Security Committee Subcommittee on Oversight, Investigations and Management tied Middle East terror organizations with Mexican drug cartels.

In 2019, the U.S. Drug Enforcement Administration (DEA) revealed that Hezbollah had established a presence in Venezuela to facilitate drug trafficking and money laundering. Hezbollah has also been involved in the production and trafficking of amphetamines, particularly Captagon, which is popular in the Gulf states. Captagon production facilities have been discovered in areas of Lebanon under Hezbollah's control.

== State-support ==
=== Iran ===
Lebanese Hezbollah, or the "Party of God," emerged from an Iranian initiative to unite various militant Shi'a groups in Lebanon during a period of domestic and regional instability, particularly the country's civil war Hezbollah's forces were trained and organized by a contingent of 1,500 Revolutionary Guards from Iran, with permission from the Syrian government. They were allowed to transit through the eastern highlands of Syrian-controlled Lebanon and establish a base in the Bekaa Valley during Lebanon's occupation. As of August 2002, Iran was reported to have financed and established terrorist training camps in the Syrian-controlled Beka'a Valley to train Hezbollah, Hamas, Palestinian Islamic Jihad (PIJ), and PFLP-GC terrorists. Iran has consistently supported Hezbollah's involvement in the Palestinian-Israeli conflict, assigning Imad Mughniyeh, Hezbollah's international operations commander, to assist Palestinian militant groups such as Hamas and PIJ. Iran utilized Hezbollah for international attacks such as the 1996 Khobar Towers bombing

=== Israel ===
After the 1979 Nahariya attack conducted by Palestinian Liberation Front militants, Israel Defense Forces Chief of Staff Rafael Eitan instructed Israeli General Avigdor Ben-Gal to "Kill them all," meaning the Palestinian Liberation Organization and those connected to it. The aim of the series of operations was to "cause chaos among the Palestinians and Syrians in Lebanon, without leaving an Israeli fingerprint, to give them the feeling that they were constantly under attack and to instill them with a sense of insecurity." Beginning in July 1981, with a bomb attack on the Palestine Liberation Organization (PLO) offices at Fakhani Road in West Beirut, these attacks were claimed by a group called the Front for the Liberation of Lebanon from Foreigners. The FLLF was itself a front for Israeli agents, and it killed hundreds of people between 1979 and 1983.

Hezbollah attributed the 2024 Lebanon pager explosions, which killed 37 people (including 2 children), to Israel. The explosions were aimed at members of the Lebanese militant group Hezbollah, but victims included family members of Hezbollah militants. Belgian deputy prime minister Petra De Sutter called the incident a "terror attack." The Lemkin Institute for Genocide Prevention condemned the incident as "terrorist attacks against Lebanese people". In official statements, the attack was also labelled terrorism by Hamas and by Iran. Leon Panetta, the former-CIA director, stated, "I don't think there's any question it's a form of terrorism."

Terrorist incidents attributed to the Front for the Liberation of Lebanon from Foreigners
date	country	location	fatalities	injured	target type
29 January 1981	France	Paris	1	8	Government (Diplomatic)
27 August 1981	Lebanon	Beirut	0	0	Government (Diplomatic)
17 September 1981	Lebanon	Chekka	10	10	Business
17 September 1981	Lebanon	Sidon	23	90	Non-state militia
20 September 1981	Lebanon	Beirut	4	28	Business
28 September 1981	Lebanon	Unknown	18	45	Non-state militia
1 October 1981	Lebanon	Beirut	83	300	Police
2 October 1981	Lebanon	Nabatiyeh	0	0	Educational Institution
29 November 1981	Syria	Aleppo	90	135	Private Citizens/Property
27 February 1982	Lebanon	Beirut	8	35	Military
21 May 1982	Lebanon	Beirut	3	10	Business
21 May 1982	Lebanon	Beirut	0	0	Business
21 May 1982	Lebanon	Beirut	0	1	Private Citizens/Property
28 January 1983	Lebanon	Chtaura	12	20	Private Citizens/Property
7 August 1983	Lebanon	Baalbek	35	133	Private Citizens/Property

=== Libya ===
Libya under Muammar Gaddafi provided sanctuary, training, arms, and financial support to a variety of Palestinian terrorist groups, including the Abu Nidal organization, the Palestine Islamic Jihad, and the Popular Front for the Liberation of Palestine-General Command (PFLP-GC). Libya has also directly been involved in state terrorism in Lebanon. Abdullatif Muntasser was an exiled Libyan political figure and a relative of the prominent opposition leader Omar Al Muheisi. He was assassinated on April 21, 1980, in Beirut, Lebanon, as part of the Libyan government's crackdown on political dissidents operating abroad.

=== Syria ===
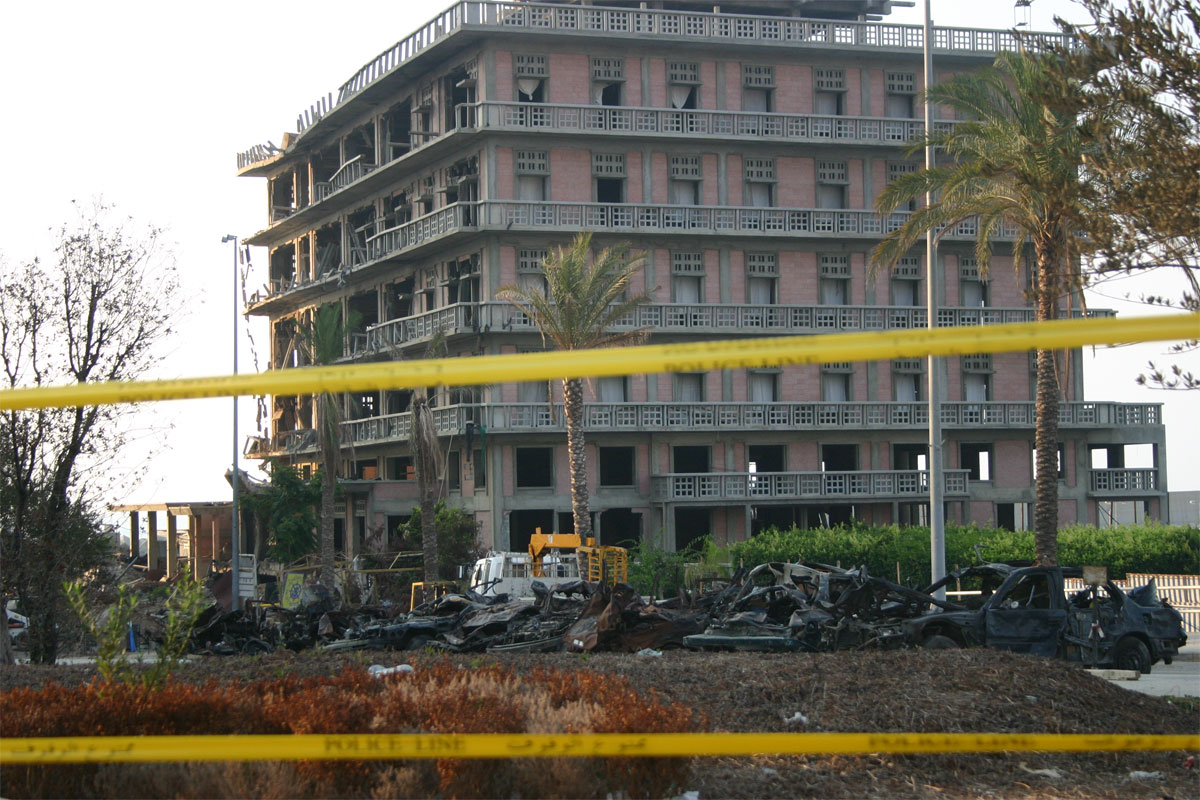
Aftermath of the Assassination of Rafic Hariri which was attributed to the Assad regime and Hezbollah.

Syria was designated as a "State Sponsor of Terrorism" by the United States in 1979 for Hafez's occupation policy in Lebanon and financing of numerous militant groups like PKK, Hezbollah, and several Iranian-backed terrorist groups. Syria has been allegedly responsible for strings of political assassinations in Lebanon most notably the assassination of Rafic Hariri which triggered the Cedar Revolution and the subsequent withdrawal of troops. International investigations revealed direct participation of members in the highest echelons of the Syrian government. Even after withdrawing troops from Lebanon in 2005, Syria continued to exert influence through its support of Hezbollah and maintain covert intelligence operations in the country. Several other bombings and assassinations against anti-Syrian figures in Lebanon include Samir Kassir, George Hawi, Gebran Tueni, Pierre Amine Gemayel, and Walid Eido.

Former cabinet member Michel Samaha was arrested on 9 August 2012 for his alleged involvement in transporting explosives into Lebanon, with the help of the Syrian Security Chief Ali Mamlouk, to carry out terrorist attacks in order to incite sectarian strife and destabilize the country. Samaha allegedly confessed on 10 August to the Internal Security Forces Information Branch that Syrian President Bashar al-Assad wanted bomb attacks in Lebanon. According to leaked interrogation transcripts, Samaha allegedly suggested that the planned bombings were meant to target Lebanese Christian leaders in order to raise sectarian tensions. The US government designated Samaha a "global terrorist" for helping the Syrian government, led by President Bashar al-Assad, launch attacks in Lebanon. Internal Security Forces leader, Wissam al-Hassan played a central role in Samaha's arrest. He was later assassinated on 19 October 2012 in which Syria has been suspected for his killing due to his involvement in the arrest of Samaha.

=== Venezuela ===
Information regarding the sale of Venezuelan passports to foreign individuals became available in 2003. Since 2006, the United States Congress has been aware of fraud regarding Venezuelan passports. The Venezuelan government has allegedly had a long-term relationship with the Islamic militant group Hezbollah. In 2006 following the 2006 Lebanon War, Hezbollah leader Hassan Nasrallah thanked President Hugo Chávez for his support, calling Chávez his "brother". Chávez also allowed members of Hezbollah to stay in Venezuela and allegedly used Venezuelan embassies in the Middle East to launder money. President Nicolas Maduro has continued the relationship with Hezbollah and called for their assistance during the 2014–15 Venezuelan protests. Members of the Venezuelan government were also accused of providing financial aid to Hezbollah by the United States Department of the Treasury, which included Charge d' Affaires of the Venezuelan Embassy in Damascus, Syria Ghazi Nasr Al-Din.

== International incidents ==
=== Africa ===
On 24 July 1987, Air Afrique Flight 056, a McDonnell Douglas DC-10-30 operating the Brazzaville–Bangui–Rome–Paris service was hijacked and diverted to Geneva Airport. One passenger was killed and 30 people were injured. The hijacker was 21-year-old Hussein Hariri, a Lebanese Shiite who claimed to be a member of the Popular Front for the Liberation of Palestine (PFLP).

The 2009 Hezbollah plot in Egypt involved the arrest of 49 men by Egyptian authorities in the five months preceding April 2009. Egypt accused them of being Hezbollah agents planning attacks against Israeli and Egyptian targets in the Sinai Peninsula. The arrests led to tensions between the Egyptian government and Hezbollah, as well as between Egypt and Iran.

=== Europe ===
On 12 April 1985, the El Descanso restaurant in Madrid, Spain was bombed in a terrorist attack. The explosion caused the three-story building to collapse, crashing down on about 200 diners and employees, killing 18 people, all Spanish citizens, and injuring 82 others, including eleven Americans working at the nearby Torrejón Air Base who frequented the restaurant. At the time it was the deadliest attack in Spain since the Spanish Civil War. Many terror organizations claimed responsibility for the attack, however the case was closed in 1987 due to a lack of arrests. Only the claim by the Islamic Jihad Organization was included in the closing summary.

On 22 July 1985, two bombs exploded in a terrorist attack in Copenhagen, Denmark. One of the bombs exploded near the Great Synagogue and a Jewish nursing home and kindergarten, and another at the offices of Northwest Orient Airlines. At least one more bomb, planned for the El Al airline offices, was discovered. One person was killed and 26 people were injured in the attacks. The Hezbollah-affiliated Islamic Jihad Organization phoned the Beirut offices of the Associated Press to claim responsibility for the attacks.

From 1985 to 1986, a series of terrorist attacks in Paris, France were carried out by the Committee for Solidarity With Arab and Middle Eastern Political Prisoners (CSPPA), a previously unknown group, demanding the release of three imprisoned international terrorists. The CSPPA was believed to have been some combination of Palestinians, Armenian nationalists, and Lebanese Marxists, though it was later reported that they were mainly instigated by Hezbollah, sponsored by the Iranian state. The CSPPA demanded the release of Anis Naccache, from the Iranian state network; Georges Ibrahim Abdallah, member of the Lebanese Armed Revolutionary Factions (LARF); and Varadjian Garbidjan, member of the Armenian Secret Army for the Liberation of Armenia (ASALA).

On July 7, 2012, local authorities arrested Lebanese-born Swedish citizen Hossam Yaakoub in Limassol, Cyprus. Yaakoub admitted to being a member of the Shi'a Islamic militant group Hezbollah, who had been tasked with surveilling the activities of Israeli tourists on the island. Israel condemned the incident as an attempted terrorist attack.

on 18 July 2012, a terrorist attack was carried out by a suicide bomber on a passenger bus transporting Israeli tourists at the Burgas Airport in Burgas, Bulgaria. The bus was carrying 42 Israelis, mainly youths, from the airport to their hotels, after arriving on a flight from Tel Aviv. The explosion killed the Bulgarian bus driver and five Israelis and injured 32 Israelis, resulting in international condemnation of the bombing. The bomber was identified as a dual Lebanese-French citizen named Mohamad Hassan El-Husseini with links to Hezbollah.

=== Americas ===
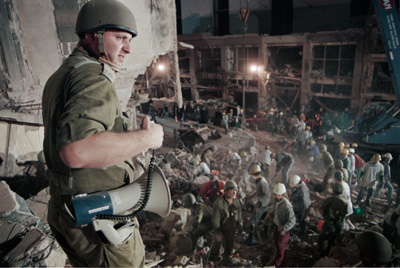
IDF Aid Mission to Argentina in the aftermath of the AMIA bombing

Hezbollah was responsible for two major terrorist attacks in Argentina in the 1990s: The 1992 bombing of the Israeli embassy in Buenos Aires, which killed 29 people. The 1994 bombing of the AMIA Jewish community center in Buenos Aires, which killed 85 people and injured over 300. This was the deadliest terrorist attack in Argentina's history.

Ziad Jarrah was one of the four hijackers involved in the September 11 attacks, specifically on United Airlines Flight 93. He was a trained Lebanese pilot. He falsely claimed there was a bomb on board and instructing passengers to remain seated intending to crash it into a significant target, likely the U.S. Capitol or the White House, after the plane took off from Newark, New Jersey. He ended up crashing into a field near Shanksville, Pennsylvania, rather than reaching its intended target.

After the 2023 Hamas-led attack on Israel and throughout the Gaza war, Hezbollah was accused of planning to carry out terrorist attacks against Jewish and Israeli civilians in South America.

=== Middle East ===
On May 30, 1972, three Japanese Red Army members, in collaboration with the PFLP, carried out the Lod Airport massacre in Tel Aviv, Israel, killing 26 people. This was the JRA's first major attack from Lebanon. Many of the victims were Christian pilgrims. The only surviving attacker was Kōzō Okamoto who currently in asylum in Lebanon.

The 1983 Kuwait bombings were carried out by Hezbollah and operatives of the Iranian-backed Iraqi Shiite group Da'wa on December 12, 1983. The targets included the American and French embassies, the Kuwait airport, the grounds of the Raytheon Corporation, a Kuwait National Petroleum Company oil rig, and a government-owned power station. The bombings killed six people and wounded nearly ninety more. Kuwaiti officials arrested seven Shia suspects, and Syrians, Iranians, and extremist Palestinians were also linked to previous threats against the U.S. Embassy in Kuwait. Ultimately, 21 defendants were put on trial (17 captured in a nationwide manhunt and 4 tried in absentia). After a six-week trial, six were sentenced to death (three of those were in absentia), seven to life imprisonment, seven to terms between five and fifteen years. Over the next several years, Hezbollah perpetrated a string of kidnappings and bombings with the goal of forcing the Kuwaiti government to free the al-Dawa prisoners. Hostage Terry Anderson was told that he and the other hostages kidnapped in Beirut had been abducted "to gain the freedom of their seventeen comrades in Kuwait." Hezbollah also conducted two hijackings in Kuwait. On 3 December 1984, a Kuwait Airways flight from Kuwait City to Karachi, Pakistan was hijacked by four Lebanese Shi'a hijackers and diverted to Tehran. On 5 April 1988, Kuwait Airways Flight 422 was hijacked from Bangkok to Kuwait with 111 passengers and crew aboard, including three members of the Kuwaiti Royal Family. Six or seven Lebanese men (including Hassan Izz-Al-Din, a veteran of the TWA 847 hijacking) armed with guns and hand grenades forced the pilot to land in Mashhad, Iran.

On 25 December 1986, en route from Baghdad's Saddam International Airport to Amman, Jordan, Flight 163 was hijacked by four men. Iraqi Airways security personnel tried to stop the hijackers, but a hand grenade was detonated in the passenger cabin, forcing the crew to initiate an emergency descent. Another hand grenade exploded in the cockpit, causing the aircraft to crash near Arar, Saudi Arabia where it broke in two and caught fire. Shortly after the hijacking, the pro-Iranian group Islamic Jihad Organization claimed responsibility.

The Khobar Towers bombing was a significant terrorist attack that occurred on June 25, 1996, in Khobar, Saudi Arabia. It targeted a housing complex used primarily by U.S. military personnel stationed there as part of Operation Southern Watch, which enforced a no-fly zone over southern Iraq following the Gulf War. The explosion resulted in the deaths of 19 U.S. Air Force personnel and injured about 498 others, including many Saudi nationals and foreign workers in the vicinity, with the explosives reportedly smuggled into Saudi Arabia from Lebanon.

== Counterterrorism ==
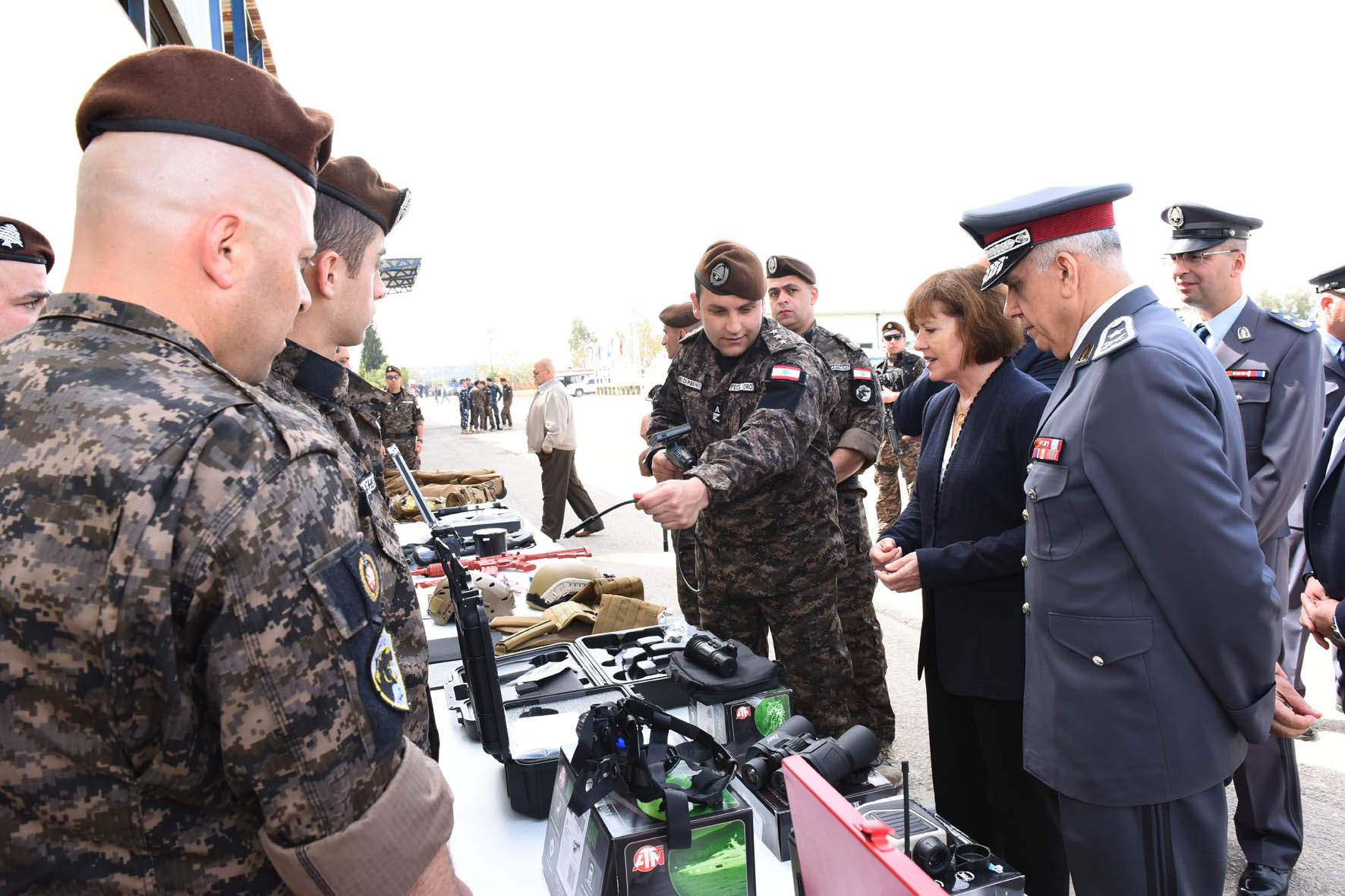
Members of the Lebanon Internal Security Forces show U.S. Ambassador to Lebanon Elizabeth Richard and ISF Brigadier General Fadi Hachem the equipment delivered to them as part of the U.S. Antiterrorism Assistance program

Since the outbreak of conflict in Syria, the Lebanese Army has been deployed to prevent clashes from taking place in the city of Tripoli, as well as in other hot zones such as Beirut and Arsal on the eastern borders. In 2014, ISIS and Al-Nusra Front terrorist groups established small bases and fortifications in the Anti-Lebanon Mountains, where they operated against Hezbollah and the Lebanese Army.

On June 23, 2013, intense clashes in Sidon took place between followers of Salafist Sunni preacher Ahmad Al-Assir and Lebanese troops. Following these clashes, the Lebanese Army was sent in to capture Sheikh Assir's headquarters at Abra and apprehend him. Lebanese Army units fought against pro-Assir militants for two days in a battle that led to the deaths of at least 16 Lebanese soldiers, and the wounding of at least 50 men. Although the LAF managed to secure his complex, Assir was able to escape and was only captured on August 16, 2015, while trying to flee the country on a false passport.

In August 2017, the Lebanese Armed Forces, commanded by Joseph Aoun, initiated the Jroud Dawn Operation which was an offensive against an Islamic State enclave on the northeast border with Syria.

The United States provided significant counterterrorism assistance to Lebanon's security forces. The U.S. has dramatically increased its Foreign Military Financing to Lebanon to enhance the capabilities of the LAF to counter terrorist threats.

=== Global war on terror ===
For decades, Israel, a key ally of the United States in the region of the Middle East, has engaged in its own war on terror against Hamas, Hezbollah, and other Iranian-backed insurgent groups. Israel launched a 34-day military conflict against Hezbollah in Lebanon, northern Israel and the Golan Heights during mid-2006. Following the October 7 attack, Israel declared the still ongoing Gaza war, leading to a ground invasion on October 27 with the stated goals of destroying Hamas and freeing hostages. Hezbollah declared support for Hamas by launching rockets towards Northern Israel. In response, the IDF have killed most of Hezbollah's command, including the secretary-general Hassan Nasrallah, and invaded southern Lebanon to destroy their infrastructure.

== Deadliest attacks ==
Deadliest attacks in Lebanon
Rank	Date	Fatalities	Injuries	Perpetrator	Location(s)
1	October 23, 1983	370	150	Hezbollah	Beirut
2	August 13, 1978	98	160	Ahmad Jibril	Beirut
3	November 11, 1982	90	55	Ahmad Qasir	Tyre
4	1 October 1981	83	300	FLLF	Beirut
5	February 9, 1987	80	15	PLO	Beirut

== List of groups ==
List of organizations that have had a presence in Lebanon and are designated terrorist by at least one country.

Organisation	Designators
Abdullah Azzam Brigades	United Nations, Argentina, Bahrain, Canada, Iraq, Japan, New Zealand, United Arab Emirates, United Kingdom, United States
Abu Nidal Organization	European Union, Canada, Japan, United Kingdom
Al-Nusra Front	United Nations, Argentina, Australia, Bahrain, Canada, Iran, Iraq, Japan, Kazakhstan, Kuwait, Kyrgyzstan Lebanon, Malaysia, New Zealand, Syria, Russia, Saudi Arabia, Tajikistan, Turkey, United Arab Emirates, United Kingdom, United States
Armenian Secret Army for the Liberation of Armenia	United States, Azerbaijan
Democratic Front for the Liberation of Palestine	United States
Fatah	United States
Hamas	European Union, Argentina, Australia, Canada, Israel, Japan, New Zealand, Paraguay, United Kingdom, United States, Organization of American States
Hezbollah	Arab League, Gulf Cooperation Council, Argentina, Australia, Bahrain, Canada, Colombia, Germany, Honduras, Israel, Malaysia, Paraguay, Saudi Arabia, United Arab Emirates, United Kingdom, United States
Hizb ut-Tahrir	China, Egypt, Indonesia, Iran, Kazakhstan, Pakistan, Russia, Saudi Arabia, Tunisia, Tajikistan, Turkey, United Kingdom
Hayat Tahrir al-Sham	United Nations, Argentina, New Zealand, Russia, Turkey, United Kingdom, United States, Morocco
Islamic State of Iraq and the Levant	United Nations, European Union, Argentina, Australia, Azerbaijan, Bahrain, Canada, China, Egypt, India, Indonesia,Iraq, Iran, Israel, Japan, Jordan, Kazakhstan, Kuwait, Kyrgyzstan Lebanon, Malaysia, New Zealand, Pakistan, Paraguay, Russia, Saudi Arabia, Tajikistan, Turkey, United Arab Emirates, United Kingdom, United States
Japanese Red Army	Japan, United States
Jund al-Sham	Russia
Kurdistan Workers' Party	European Union, NATO, Australia, Austria, Azerbaijan, Bulgaria, Canada, Czech Republic, Finland, Iran, Japan, Kazakhstan, Kyrgyzstan, Netherlands, New Zealand, Poland, Portugal, Spain, Syria, Sweden, Turkey, United Kingdom, United States
Osbat al-Ansar	United Nations, Argentina, Bahrain, Canada, Japan, Kazakhstan, New Zealand, Russia, United Arab Emirates, United Kingdom, United States
Palestinian Islamic Jihad	European Union, Australia, Canada, Israel, Japan, New Zealand, United Kingdom, United States
Palestinian Liberation Front	United Kingdom
Palestine Liberation Organization	United Kingdom
Popular Front for the Liberation of Palestine	European Union, Canada, Japan, United States
PFLP-GC	European Union, Canada, Japan, United Kingdom, United States

== See also ==
- List of extrajudicial killings and political violence in Lebanon
- List of massacres in Lebanon
- List of assassinations in Lebanon
- Terrorism
- List of attacks in Lebanon
- Attacks linked to the Cedar Revolution
