= Chloé Delaume =

French novelist, performer, musician, & singer (born 1973)

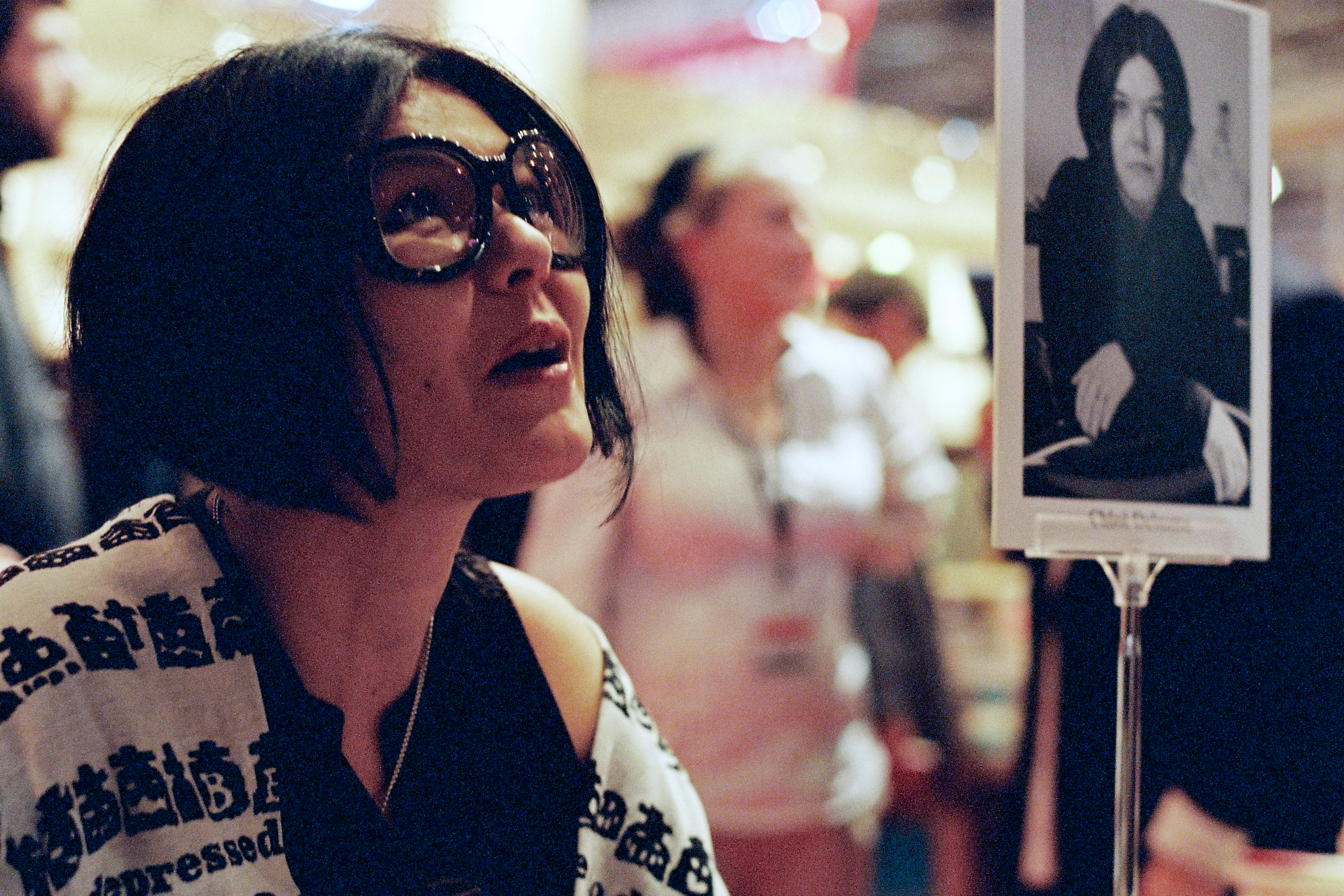
Chloé Delaume

Chloé Delaume (French pronunciation: [klɔe dəlom]; born Nathalie Dalain in 1973) is a French writer. She is also an editor and, more occasionally, a performer, musician, and singer. Her literary work, largely autobiographical, focuses on the practice of experimental literature, feminism and the issue of autofiction.

== Biography ==
Born in 1973 to a French mother and a Lebanese father, Chloé Delaume spent part of her childhood in Beirut, where the Lebanese Civil War that began in 1975 eventually destroyed her home. In 1983, at ten years old, she witnessed her father murder her mother, and then kill himself. She is the niece of Georges Ibrahim Abdallah.

She then went to live with her grandparents, and later with her uncle and aunt. Wanting to become a teacher like her mother, she enrolled in the Modern Literature program at Université de Paris X until her master's degree, and began an unfinished thesis on Pataphysics in the works of Boris Vian.

Disillusioned with the academic system, she left the university and began writing while working as a sex worker in hostess bars.

=== Literary career ===
From 1998 to 2001 she worked as a literary critic for Matricule des Anges under her real name, while also beginning to publish texts in literary journals.

Between 1999 and 2002 she was part of the core team of the literary journal, EvidenZ, founded by Mehdi Belhaj Kacem (her husband until 2002). She published three texts in the journal, for the first time under the name Chloé Delaume. The first name 'Chloé' was borrowed from the heroine of Boris Vian's L'Écume des jours, and the surname 'Delaume' came from Antonin Artaud's work L'Arve et l'Aume: ' there is a death of civil identity because I did not choose it. One morning I said to myself, "Enough, my life does not suit me, who I am does not suit me, I will become someone else," and I made that decision." She left the journal after the second and final issue.

Chloé Delaume published her first novel, "Les Mouflettes d'Atropos", in 2000 with Farrago. From September to December 2001 she was a resident at Centre international de poésie Marseille, where she wrote "Monologue pour épluchures d’Atrides", published in 2003 by CipM/Spectres familiers. In the fall of 2001, she won the prix Décembre.

Between January 2005 and June 2007, she managed the forum for the television show "Arrêt sur images", a critical media program hosted by Daniel Schneidermann on France 5 that examines political, social, and cultural issues through the lens of media representation. She reported on the critiques and comments written there once a month on the show's set. Chloé Delaume was then nicknamed 'the forum manager.' During this period, she wrote and published "J’habite dans la télévision", which she adapted into performances.

In 2008, she participated in the creation of the contemporary literature journal "Tina", published by èe. In 2010. she was named a Chevalière of Arts and Letters. That same year, she launched the event "À vous de lire", for which she served as a patron alongside Frédéric Mitterrand.

By the end of 2010, Chloé Delaume became the director of a collection titled « Extraction » for éditions Joca Seria, aiming to primarily publish experimental literature. She would go on to publish eleven titles in this collection.

From April 2011 to April 2012, she was a resident at the Villa Médicis where she conducted research on Messalina and explored the intersections of magic and politics through performances.

Between 6 May 2012 (the date of and 16 July 2012, she wrote a weekly column on François Hollande's presidency titled "Bienvenue à Normaland" on the website of Arrêt sur images.

In 2017, she developed the cycle "Liberté-Parité-Sororité" with the writer residency program of the Île-de-France region, at the Violette and Co bookstore, while conducting writing workshops at the Palais de la Femme.

In 2019, she joined the reading committee of the literature department at éditions du Seuil . That same year, she became a member of the jury for the Prix Décembre.

In 2020, she was awarded the prestigious Prix Médicis for her novel Le Cœur synthétique.

In 2021, she held the column Au lance-flammes in the magazine Causette for six months.

In 2021, she edited the collective work "Sororité", published by Points Féminisme, which features contributions from fourteen authors, including Lydie Salvayre, Lola Lafon, Ovidie, Camille Froidevaux-Metterie, and Alice Coffin.

From 2021 to 2023, she organized a monthly reading event called "La petite veillée" at the feminist café "Chez Mona" in Paris, where she invited new voices and highlighted poetry.

In 2023, she became the patron of Villa Valmont, a house dedicated to writing and landscapes, which opened its doors in April.

== Engagement ==
In May 2022 she joined the parliament of Nouvelle Union populaire écologique et sociale.

Chloé Delaume signed the op-ed published in the 19 January 2024 edition of the newspaper Libération, opposing the sponsorship of the 2024 edition of the "Printemps des poètes" by the writer Sylvain Tesson.

=== Family and personal life ===
Chloé Delaume is the niece of Georges Ibrahim Abdallah, who had been incarcerated in France from 1984 to 2025 and sentenced to life imprisonment in 1987 for two political assassinations.

In 1999 she married the philosopher Mehdi Belhaj Kacem, but they separated in 2002. She remarried in 2006 to Thomas Scotto d'Abusco, and they divorced in 2013.

For a time, she shared her life with Daniel Schneidermann, from whom she has since separated. They co-wrote "Où le sang nous appelle", published in 2013.

== Literary work ==
Chloé Delaume has written numerous novels that reflect an original poetic and formal exploration. Her work is primarily experimental.

Autofiction, technology and the digital realm, 'bio-power,' play, and the stakes of literature are recurring themes in her work, which has been tinged with feminism since its beginnings.

She defines her literary endeavor as a 'politics of revolution of the self,' with an internal intention to 'refuse the fables that saturate reality, the collective, familial, cultural, religious, institutional, social, economic, political, and media fictions.' (La Règle du Je)

She cites multiple sources of inspiration, ranging from Pierre Guyotat to Christine Angot, as well as Marguerite Duras, Sophie Calle, Guillaume Apollinaire, and the verses of Jean Racine.

Beyond her literary work, she composes texts with Julien Locquet, which she performs on albums by the band Dorine Muraille. This collaboration also leads to multimedia performances.

She also participates in writing radio plays for France Culture, such as Transhumances in 2006.

Her literary shock, the moment when she says she 'entered into literature,' was the reading of L'Écume des jours by Boris Vian. She wrote an essay on the influence of Boris Vian on her work, titled Les juins ont tous la même peau, borrowed from Vian's novel Les morts ont tous la même peau.

Le Cri du sablier, published by Farrago, earned her the prix Décembre in 2001. It can be considered the second part of an autofictional trilogy that began with "Les Mouflettes d'Atropos" and concluded with "La Vanité des somnambules".

In 2004, in "Certainement pas", she draws inspiration from the game Cluedo as a narrative framework. In 2007, she published a game book, "La nuit je suis Buffy Summers", based on the universe of the TV series Buffy the Vampire Slayer.

" Dans ma maison sous terre", published in 2009, pushes the performative aspect of her work to its peak: the novel becomes a weapon with the sole intention of provoking the death of Chloé Delaume's grandmother · .

In 2012 she published "Une femme avec personne dedans" (Seuil).

In 2013 she co-authored Où le sang nous appelle (Seuil) with Daniel Schneidermann, a novel dedicated to Georges Ibrahim Abdallah, who is both her uncle and the presumed leader of the Lebanese Armed Revolutionary Factions. He was sentenced to life imprisonment during a trial held in France in 1987, accused of the assassination of Israeli and American diplomats, a trial that Schneidermann covered as a journalist for Le Monde.

In 2015 she experimented with digital writing and published "Alienare", a hybrid book combining text, film, and music, with illustrator Franck Dion. She stated to Rue89: 'With hybridity, one can suddenly touch upon something that is a form of total art.

In 2016 she published "Les Sorcières de la République", a whimsical dystopia where the feminist revolution fails due to rivalry among women.

She continued her reflection on sisterhood by publishing "Mes bien chères sœurs" in 2019, choosing the formal structure of an open letter.

In 2020 she addressed the issue of the invisibility of women approaching 50 and their obsolescence in the market of love. She published Le Cœur synthétique, a parody of a romantic comedy, which won the Prix Médicis.

In 2023 she published Pauvre folle (Seuil), a novel about a strange, obsessive love.

In 2024 she released Phallers, a fiction in which girls and women suddenly gain the psychic ability to make the phallus of sexual aggressors implode. Published by Points Feminismes, the book's tagline states, "We don't know what to invent anymore to make men stop raping."

== Bibliography ==
- Les Mouflettes d'Atropos, Éditions Farrago, 2000
- Mes Week-ends sont pires que les vôtres, Éditions du Néant, 2001
- Le Cri du sablier, Éditions farrago/Léo Scheer, 2001
- La Vanité des Somnambules, Éditions Farrago/Léo Scheer, 2003
- Monologue pour épluchures d'Atrides, Éditions du C.I.P.M., 2003
- Corpus Simsi, Éditions Léo Scheer, 2003
- Certainement pas, Éditions Verticales, 2004
- Les Juins ont tous la même peau, Éditions La Chasse au Snark, 2005
- J'habite dans la télévision, Éditions Verticales, 2006
- Neuf Leçons de littérature, 2007
- Chanson de geste & Opinions, Éditions Mac/Val, 2007
- La Dernière Fille avant la guerre, Éditions Naïve Sessions, 2007
- La Nuit je suis Buffy Summers, Éditions èe, 2007
- Transhumances, Éditions èe, 2007
- Dans ma maison sous terre, Seuil (Fiction & cie collection), 2008
- Eden matin midi et soir, Joca Seria, 2009
- Narcisse et ses aiguilles, L'une et l'autre, 2009
- Au commencement était l'adverbe, 2010
- La Règle du je, PUF, 2010
- Sillages, Cadex, 2010
- Le Deuil des deux syllabes, L'une et l'autre, 2011
- Une femme avec personne dedans, Seuil, 2012
- Perceptions, illustrations de François Alary, éditions Joca Seria, 2012
- Où le sang nous appelle, avec Daniel Schneidermann, Seuil, 2013
- Les Sorcières de la République, Seuil, 2016
- Mes Bien Chères Sœurs, Seuil, 2019
