= Assassination of Charles R. Ray =

1982 murder of US Army officer

- Location: Paris, France
- Date: January 18, 1982; 9:00 a.m. (UTC+1:00)
- Attack type: Assassination
- Weapon: 7.62 mm caliber pistol
- Deaths: 1
- Motive: U.S. involvement in the Lebanese Civil War
- Convicted: Georges Ibrahim Abdallah

On January 18, 1982, Colonel Charles Robert Ray, a United States Army officer who was serving as an assistant military attaché in France, was assassinated in front of his Paris home by Georges Ibrahim Abdallah, a Lebanese communist militant affiliated with the Lebanese Armed Revolutionary Factions. Abdallah was convicted of the crime and sentenced to prison. He was released on July 24, 2025, and repatriated to Beirut.

== Background ==
Colonel Charles R. Ray
- Born: September 14, 1938; New York City, New York, U.S.
- Died: January 18, 1982 (aged 43); Paris, France
- Military career
- Allegiance: United States
- Branch: United States Army
- Service years: 1960–1982
- Rank: Colonel
- Conflicts: Vietnam War

Charles R. Ray (September 14, 1938 – January 18, 1982) was born in New York City. Having been commissioned in the U.S. Army in 1960, he was a distinguished military intelligence officer, and a Bronze Star-decorated veteran of the Vietnam war. He later graduated from the University of Santa Clara. Ray was married, and had two children. During the late 1970s, he resided in Northern Virginia, where he was an active parishioner at St. Bernadette's Roman Catholic Church in Springfield, Virginia, and was responsible for coordinating the altar servers.

Ray was dispatched to Paris in order to serve as the Assistant Army Attaché, which he did for 18 months. His first assignment as a military attaché, he was one of four at the embassy. On November 12, 1981, a lone gunman brandishing a 7.62 mm caliber pistol almost succeeded in assassinating U.S. chargé d'affaires Christian Chapman outside his home in Paris. He escaped by ducking underneath his car.

== Assassination ==
On January 18, 1982, Ray was shot in the head at point-blank range at around 9:00 a.m. as he walked to his car, which was parked about 100 yards from his Paris apartment. The earliest reports indicated that a lone armed man shot Ray—who was wearing a three-piece suit instead of a military uniform—at close range in the head with the same type of pistol used on Chapman. A witness said she saw a short man with long hair running away from the scene after shooting Ray, who was found lying on his back with a bullet hole in his forehead. A spent 7.62 mm cartridge and a medical glove were found nearby.

U.S. Ambassador to France Evan G. Galbraith surmised that Ray may not have been the intended target. U.S. Treasury Secretary Donald Regan, who was meeting in Paris with his Western counterparts, was escorted by security personnel to Orly Airport, where he was to board a Pan Am flight to New York. However, one hundred people were removed from the plane and had their bags thoroughly searched before it would be allowed to take off.

The Lebanese Armed Revolutionary Factions (LARF) immediately issued a statement in Arabic claiming responsibility for the murder. This organization had a very similar name to the one which claimed responsibility for shooting at Chapman. A 35-year-old Lebanese man, Georges Ibrahim Abdallah, was later accused of shooting and killing Ray.

=== Funeral ===
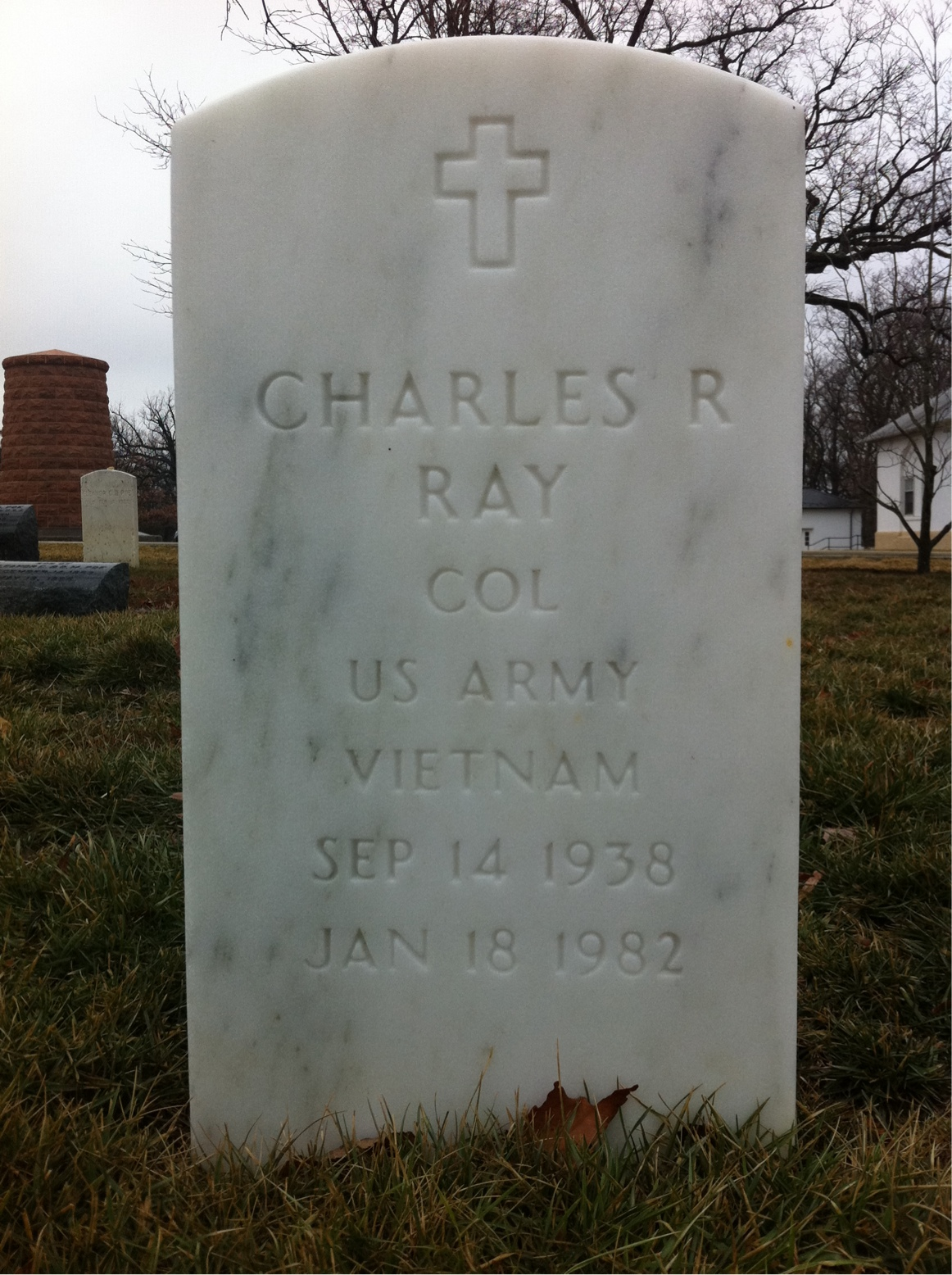
Grave at Arlington National Cemetery

A state funeral was held for Ray at Notre Dame Cathedral in Paris, where he and his family had attended Mass since they first arrived in Paris in 1980. Following the Mass, Ray's body was flown back to the U.S. for a service at St. Bernadette's. Ray was interred at Arlington National Cemetery.

== Reactions ==
French President François Mitterrand expressed outrage at the killing, and pledged to help the United States with security for its officials.

U.S. President Ronald Reagan called Ray's wife the same day of the assassination, telling her that the United States was working with the French government to improve security for its personnel. He issued the following statement regarding Ray:

Lieutenant Colonel Charles R. Ray, our Assistant Army Attaché in Paris, was a distinguished career officer. He gave his life in the line of duty as surely as if he had fallen in battle. Our hearts go out to his family in their bereavement, and the wanton act of his murderers reinforces our determination to stamp out international terrorism and prevent similar tragedies in the future.

On a visit to Paris in June 1982—during which time he met with Ray's wife—Reagan promoted Ray to Colonel posthumously, formally approving the promotion on June 3.

== Aftermath ==
Abdallah was arrested in 1984 and was sentenced to life in prison in February 1987 for his involvement in the execution. In November 2024, a French court ordered his release by December 6, 2024. The state prosecutors appealed the ruling. On 17 July 2025, the Court of Appeal of Paris ordered his release, to be followed by an immediate expulsion to Lebanon. The decision was carried out on 25 July.

== See also ==
- Killing of Yacov Barsimantov – another 1982 shooting of a diplomat in France in which Ray's killer was implicated
- Robert O. Homme – another U.S. official in France who was targeted for assassination by LARF
