= Comrade =

Term meaning friend, colleague or ally, with political connotations

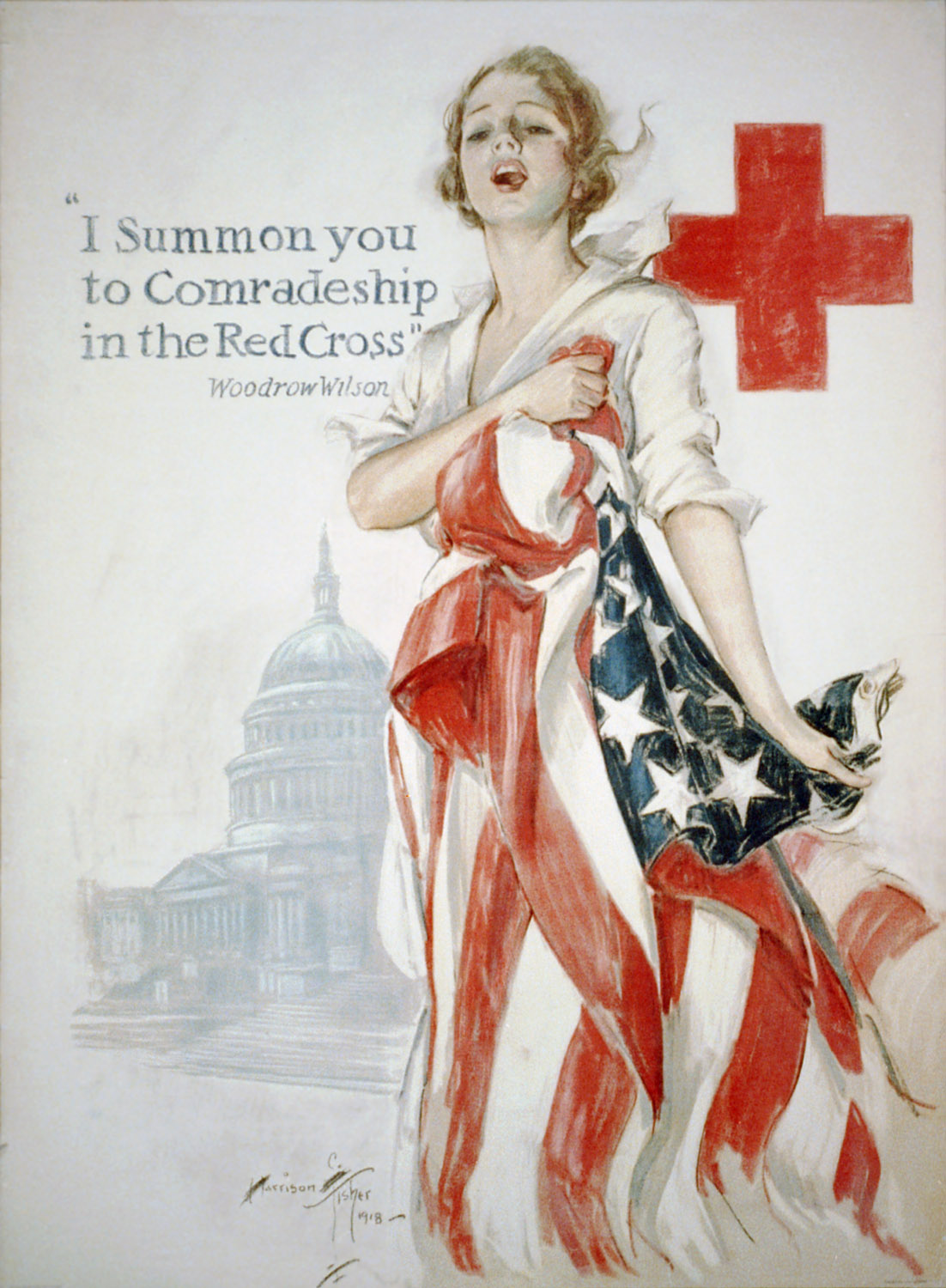
World War I American Red Cross poster by Harrison Fisher, 1918

In political contexts, comrade means a fellow party member. The political use was inspired by the French Revolution, after which it grew into a form of address between socialists and workers. Since the Russian Revolution, popular culture in the United States has often associated it with communism. As such, it can also be used as a reference to leftists, akin to "commie". In particular, the Russian word товарищ (tovarishch) may be used as a reference to communists.

The influence of the term in communism in the 20th century has led to some anarchists preferring the term "companion", a term that has been used in Western Europe since the end of the 19th century.

== Etymology ==
The term comrade generally means "mate", "colleague", or "ally", and derives from the Spanish and Portuguese term camarada, lit. 'chamber mate', from Latin camera, lit. 'chamber' or 'room'. It may also specifically mean "fellow soldier", comrade in arms.

== Background ==
Upon abolishing the titles of nobility in France, and the terms monsieur and madame (literally, "my lord" and "my lady"), the revolutionaries employed the term citoyen for men and citoyenne for women (both meaning "citizen") to refer to each other. The deposed King Louis XVI, for instance, was referred to as Citoyen Louis Capet to emphasize his loss of privilege.

When the socialist movement gained momentum in the mid-19th century, socialists elsewhere began to look for a similar egalitarian alternative to terms like "Mister", "Miss", or "Missus". In German, the word Kamerad had long been used as an affectionate form of address among people linked by some strong common interest, such as a sport, a college, a profession (notably as a soldier), or simply friendship. The term was often used with political overtones in the revolutions of 1848, and was subsequently borrowed by French and English. In English, the first known use of the word comrade with this meaning was in 1884 in the socialist magazine Justice.

== Political usage ==
=== Russian and Soviet usage ===
In the late 19th century, Russian Marxists and other leftist revolutionaries adopted the word "tovarisch" (Russian: товарищ) as a translation for the German term Kamerad. Originally, "tovarisch" meant "business companion" or "travel (or other adventure) mate" deriving from the Old Turkic tavar ishchi; abbreviated tov., and related to the noun товар (tovar, meaning "merchandise"). In socialist and labour movements, it became a common form of address, as in Tovarisch Plekhanov or Tovarisch Chairman or simply as Tovarisch (especially German) social democracy. After the Russian Revolution, translations of "tovarisch" spread globally among communists, though the term "comrade" became closely associated with the Soviet Union specifically in the eyes of many.

With the February Revolution of 1917, traditional forms of address common in Tsarist Russia would become deeply unpopular and were replaced by the more republican and egalitarian title of citizen. However, this would be overshadowed by the address of comrade due to the more revolutionary connotations. The term "citizen" did not seem sufficiently pro-revolutionary as many monarchists identified themselves as "Russian citizens and loyal subjects of the sovereign-Emperor". In contrast being called "comrade" implied a kind of revolutionary zeal and exceptionalism. Yet, it was widely used across society: socialists in the Provisional Government were known as "comrade ministers", policemen and Cossacks were addressed as "comrades", and even rural witch-doctors became "comrade spirits".

During the revolutionary period, once the Bolsheviks had taken power, they continued to use "comrade" to address or refer to people presumed to be sympathetic to the revolution and to the Soviet state, such as workers, members of the Communist Party, and (for a time) Left Socialist-Revolutionaries. For everyone else, citizen was the preferred term; however, it could also serve as an insult, especially if the individual expected a more respectful address. For instance, the guards of Nicholas II deliberately called him "citizen Romanov" during his captivity. The anti-Bolshevik socialists, such as the Socialist Revolutionaries and the Mensheviks, also addressed each other as "comrade", while the Whites mockingly, referred to their enemies as "the comrades". As discontent with the Bolshevik regime grew, even within the Soviet camp, comrade could be seen as an insult. in one instance, a woman on a Petrograd tram, when addressed as "comrade", replied: "What's all this "comrade" talk? Take your "comrade" and go to hell!".

By the mid-1920s, the address Tovarisch had become so widespread in the Soviet Union that it was used casually as titles like "Mister" or "Sir" in English. That use persisted until the dissolution of the Soviet Union. Still, the original meaning partly re-surfaced in some contexts: criminals and suspects were only addressed as "citizens" and not as tovarischi, and expressly refusing to address someone as tovarisch would generally be perceived as a hostile act or, during the Stalin era, even as an accusation of being "Anti-Soviet".

Currently, in the Russian Armed Forces, tovarisch is used as a statutory form of address. Accordingly, it is always to be used by military personnel when referring to one another. Senior officers referring to subordinates must call them either by their military rank and last name, or only their military rank with tovarisch being added before the rank. The reverse is also true, though subordinates are not permitted to call their superiors by their last name. One example is "Comrade Senior Lieutenant" (товарищ старший лейтенант).

=== Chinese usage ===
In Chinese, the translation of comrade is 同志 (pinyin: tóng zhì), literally meaning "(people with) the same spirit, goal, ambition, etc." It was first introduced in the political sense by Sun Yat-sen to refer to his followers. The Kuomintang (Nationalist Party), which was co-founded by Sun Yat-sen, has a long tradition of using this term to refer to its members, usually as a noun rather than a title; for example, a KMT member would say "Mr. Chang is a loyal and reliable comrade (同志)."

Nevertheless, the term was promoted most actively by the Chinese Communist Party during its struggle for power. It was used both as a noun and as a title for basically anyone in mainland China after the People's Republic of China was founded. For example, women were nü tongzhi ("female comrade"), children were xiao tongzhi ("little comrade") and seniors were lao tongzhi ("old comrade"). However, after the 1980s and the onset of China's market-oriented reforms, this term has been moving out of such daily usage. It remains in use as a respectful term of public address among middle-aged Chinese and members of the Chinese Communist Party. Within the Communist Party, failure to address a fellow member as tóng zhì is seen as a subtle but unmistakable sign of disrespect and enmity.

At party or civil meetings, the usage of the term has been retained. Officials often address each other as Tongzhi, and thus the usage here is not limited to Communist Party members alone. In addition, Tongzhi is the term of preference to address any national leader when their titles are not attached (e.g., Comrade Mao Zedong, Comrade Deng Xiaoping).

In October 2016, the Central Committee of the Chinese Communist Party issued a directive urging all 90 million party members to keep calling each other "comrades" instead of less egalitarian terms. It is also in the regulations of the Chinese Armed Forces as one of three appropriate ways to formally address another member of the military ("comrade" plus rank or position, as in "Comrade Colonel", or simply "comrade/s" when lacking information about the person's rank, or talking to several servicepeople.)

The SAR territories of Hong Kong and Macau generally use tongzhi as a catch-all term to refer to members of the LGBT community; its use as a word for "comrade" has historically been uncommon due to both territories formerly being under foreign administrations. This definition of tongzhi is becoming increasingly popular among mainland Chinese youth and a growing number of older Chinese people have stopped using tongzhi due to its new association with the LGBT community.

=== South African usage ===
During the 1970s and 1980s, comrade emerged as a popular revolutionary form of address in South Africa among those involved in anti-apartheid political activities. For example, members of the African National Congress and South African Communist Party frequently referred to each other as comrade.

Among poor residents of the country's segregated townships, it was also used to specifically denote members of militant youth organisations. These radical activists led consumer boycotts, organised anti-apartheid rallies and demonstrations, and intimidated those suspected of having ties to the South African government or security forces. In this particular context, the English title comrades was also used interchangeably with the Xhosa term amabutho.

=== Zimbabwean usage ===
In Zimbabwe, the term is used for persons affiliated with the ZANU–PF political party. The state media also use Cde as short for comrade.

=== South Sudanese usage ===
Members of the Sudan People's Liberation Army call each other "Comrade".

=== British usage ===
The British Union of Fascists used the word commonly to refer to members. Their marching song, set to the music of the Horst-Wessel-Lied began "Comrades, the voices". The writer, E.D. Randall, defended the usage of the word by stating that "comrades" "fittingly and completely expresses the ideal of unity in the service of a common cause".

=== Kenyan usage ===
In Kenya, the use of the word comrade is in a more traditional sense to mean "member". It is commonly used by trade unionists, political parties and University students as a form of solidarity and common identity. It features prominently in chant songs by University student leaders and popular youth culture as a term of endearment.

=== Cuban usage ===
In Cuba, the corresponding revolutionary form of address in Spanish was compañero, e.g., Compañero Fidel.

== In other languages ==
- In Albanian, the word shok (meaning friend, from Latin socius) was used within communist circles. The female form is shoqe.
- In Ethiopia, the Amharic word for "comrade" is "Guade" written with ancient Geʽez script as "ጓድ". The word "Guade" trace its origin to the Amharic word of "Guadegna/ ጓደኛ" meaning " a friend". The word was in popular use after the 1974 revolution particularly by members of the socialist party to refer to another person of the similar political group, belongs to the same ideology, or similar style. The usage of the word is eroded since 1991 and it is limited to political party conventions or meetings. A rather the most popular variation of the word in the past and currently is "Guadochae/ ጓዶቼ" meaning "my friends" which is a humble way of address for a valued colleague or friend.
- The Arabic word رفيق (Rafīq) (meaning comrade, companion) is used in Arabic, Urdu and Persian with the same political connotation as "comrade". The term is used both among Arab communists as well as within the Ba'ath movement, the Yemeni Socialist Party, and the Lebanese Forces. The term predates modern political usage, and is an Arabic male proper name. Iranian communists use the same term. In Pakistan, the term is sometimes used to refer to Islamist members of Jama'at-e-Islami and Islami Jamiat-e-Talaba (the student wing of Jamaat-e-Islami).
- The Armenian word for comrade is ընկեր (unger) for boys and men and ընկերուհի (ungerouhi) for girls and women. This word literally translates as "friend". It is used by members of the Armenian Revolutionary Federation, Ramgavar and Social Democrat Hunchakian Party when addressing other members of the party. The term is also used by the Armenian Communist Party.
- The Azerbaijani word for comrade is Yoldaş (literally "co-traveller").
- The Belarusian word for comrade is таварыш (tavaryš), with the same origin as the Russian word. It is usually used only with a political or historical meaning in connection with the Communists.
- The Bengali word কমরেড (Kômrēḍ) is used by all leftist groups especially by the Communist Party of Bangladesh (বাংলাদেশের কমিউনিস্ট পার্টি-সিপিবি), Communist Party of India, Communist Party of India (Marxist) and other Communist Parties in India (especially in the States of West Bengal and Tripura) and Socialist Party of Bangladesh-SPB, Jatiyo Samajtantrik Dal-JSD (Bangladesh) etc.
- The Burmese word yèbaw (ရဲဘော်) is used in the Communist Party of Burma.
- The Bulgarian word for comrade is другар (drugar), female другарка (drugarka). It translates as friend or colleague. In Communist times, it was the general form of address, also used in reference to schoolteachers etc.
- In Catalan, the word for comrade is company for males, companya for females. It is still in widespread use among communist and anarchist organisations, but it also occurs often in everyday speech to refer to neutral relationships such as classmates or flatmates with no political connotation.
- The Czech word for comrade is soudruh (m.) and soudružka (f.). In 19th century Czech, it was a poetic word, meaning "fellow". As elsewhere in Europe, the term was originally introduced by the Czech Social Democrats and subsequently carried over to Czech Communists as well when these split off from the Social Democrats. After the Communist Party gained power in 1948, the word displaced all prior titles like pan, paní ("Mister", "Madam") and became the title used generally for everyone. Nowadays, it is used only in (actual or, more often, ironic) Communist context. After the Velvet Revolution, an attempt was made in the Czech Social Democratic Party to replace soudruh with přítel ("friend") as a form of an address, but it didn't catch on. A cognate to English word "comrade", kamarád, means "friend" in Czech. It is a very commonly used word and it has no political connotations. A cognate (now obsolete) to the Russian word tovarishch, tovaryš, means "journeyman" in Czech and has no political connotations (compare Tovaryšstvo Ježíšovo, lit. "Jesus's Journeymen").
- The Dutch word is kameraad. In Common Dutch the word is mostly reminiscent of communists, whereas in informal speech and dialects it can be used to indicate friends or acquaintances. It was used as a form of address in the Communist Party of the Netherlands, as well as in the pre-war National Socialist Movement in the Netherlands, the latter also using the female neologism kameraadske. The pseudo-Russian word kameraadski is used informally as a sobriquet for a person with leftist sympathies.
- The Danish word is kammerat (plural kammerater) which literally translates as "mate," or "buddy". It is normally used to refer to someone's childhood friend or friends, but can also be used interchangeably with ven, which means friend.
- The Esperanto word for comrade is kamarado either in the sense of a friend or a political fellow-traveller. In the latter case, when used in writing, it is often abbreviated to K-do. It is the preferred form of address among members of Sennacieca Asocio Tutmonda. The word samideano, literally "same-thinker", usually refers to a fellow Esperantist.
- The Estonian word is seltsimees which originally comes from German Geselle. Having initially a neutral meaning, the term was later adapted by local communists. Today it has an ironical meaning, referring to Soviet times.
- The Finnish word is toveri which literally translates as "companion". This has a heavy socialist connotation, but may sometimes be used in humorous manner. Mates in an institution like school, jail or hospital could also be addressed thus, but not in the army.
- The French word is camarade. It is mainly used by communists and can apply to classmates or friends.
- The Georgian word is ამხანაგი (amkhanagi).
- In German, the word is Kamerad for a male, or Kameradin for a female. The meaning is that of a fellow, a companion or an associate. Since Kamerad is the usual term for a fellow soldier in German military language, the word is associated with right-wing rather than left-wing groups. Communists and socialists, especially party members of the SED and SPD use the word Genosse (fem. Genossin; i.e. "partner", in the sense of a fellow member of a co-operative) with the socialist association that "comrade" has in English. Members of the NSDAP used the variant Parteigenosse (lit. party-comrade).
- The Greek word is σύντροφος (syntrophos, m.) and συντρόφισσα (syntrophissa, f.), used by communists, socialists and other left-wing groups. Other meanings of this word are: mate, pal, friend, companion, even partner or associate etc.
- The Hebrew equivalent is Chaver (חבר), a word which can mean both "friend" and "member" (of a group or organization). During the time of Socialist Zionist political and ideological dominance of the 1930s to the 1960s, the word in a sense similar to English "comrade" was in widespread use, in the Kibbutz movement, the Histadrut trade unions, the driver-owned bus companies etc., though this implication is carried only when it is used as a title to precede a name, in which case it includes a definite article (e.g. החבר סטאלין). At present, its political use is considered old-fashioned, mainly restricted to Israeli Communists; the same word exists also in Yiddish, which is one possible origin of the colloquial Australian word cobber.) The Hebrew Chaver and the female Chavera are still widely used in a non-political sense, as meaning simply "friend" (in certain contexts also meaning "boyfriend"/"girlfriend").
- The Hindi equivalent for comrade is kômrēḍ (कॉमरेड) or sāthī (साथी). It is widely used among leftist (communist) parties of India, e.g., Communist Party of India, Communist Party of India (Marxist), Revolutionary Socialist Party (India), Forward Bloc and others.
- The Hungarian word for comrade is elvtárs; elv means "principle" or "tenet" while társ means "fellow". As the Hungarian Working People's Party gradually gained power after the Second World War, the word displaced all prior titles like úr ("Mister") and became the title used generally for everyone except for people who were obviously not "tenet fellows" e.g. those who committed political crime against the socialist state. After the democratic transition the word became obsolete and it is used derogatorily to address politicians on the political left.
- The Icelandic word for comrade is félagi, which is cognate to English "fellow". It is used as a less intimate alternative to vinur (friend). It is also the word used for a "member" of club or association. When used as a title to precede a name (e.g., félagi Tító or félagi Dimitroff) it has a communist implication.
- In Indonesian, the word is kamerad. In the early days of independence, Bung, meaning "brother", was commonly used as an egalitarian form of address for people of any status. The word kawan (friend) is now also widely used among leftists.
- In Irish the word for comrade is comrádaí, with a chara (friend) used as a term of address. Both expressions are used largely by Irish Republicans, Nationalism, Communists, and Socialists.
- The Italian word for comrade is compagno (male) or compagna (female), meaning "companion". This word is in widespread use among left-wing circles, including not just communists but also many socialists. The literal translation of the word comrade is camerata, with the specific meaning of "comrade-in-arms" or "fellow soldier": it is used by nationalist and militarist right-wing groups. Using one word or the other is a quick way to announce one's political views.
- The Japanese word for comrade is 同志 (dōshi), using the same Han characters as in Chinese. The word is used to refer to like-minded persons and the usage is not necessarily limited to Communists, though the word is to some extent associated with Communism. The word should not be confused with a homonym 同士, which is a more commonly used postfix to show people sharing a certain property.
- In Kannada, the word ಗೆಳೆಯರೇ, ಗೆಳೆಯ (Geḷeẏa) is used among communist people's while addressing its people.
- In Kazakh, the translation of "tovarish" was similar to other Turkic translations, "жолдас"; "joldas" Kazakh pronunciation: [ʐɔɫdɑs] (literally "co-traveller", most often used referring to friends and spouses) was used.
- In Khmer, the word comrade (Khmer: សមមិត្ត Samakmit or មិត្ត Mit) was used by the Kampuchean United Front for National Salvation during the People's Republic of Kampuchea era.
- In Korean, a good equivalent of the word would be 동무 (tongmu) or 동지 (tongji or dongji, senior comrade). Although the word was originally used by Korean people all over the Korean Peninsula, even by people in the Korean independence movement, it is said that people living south of the 38th Parallel began avoiding using the word after a communist state was set up in the north. In North Korea, the word tongmu replaced all prior social titles and earned a new meaning as "a fellow man fighting for the revolution". The word originally meant "friend". On the other hand, the word 동지 (tongji) is frequently used in North Korean state media to address senior state and party leaders such as Kim Jong-un.
- In Kurdish, the word Heval ("friend" or "companion on a long journey") is widely used among Kurdish political parties and organizations.
- In Lao, the word is sahai (ສະຫາຍ).
- In Latvian, the word is biedrs for males and biedre or biedrene for females.
- In Lithuanian, the word is draugas for males and draugė for females; both of which originally meant "friend".
- In Macedonian, the word is другар (drugar) for men and другарка (drugarka) for women.
- In Malay, the words Komrad, Kawan and Sahabat are used among socialist organizations.
- In Malayalam, the word സഖാവ് (sakhavu) (meaning friend, ally, partner) is used among communist organisations while addressing fellow members. Due to the strong presence of the Communist Party of India in Kerala, the word is almost exclusively used to refer to a member of the party or to imply an association with communism.
- In Mexico, the word is camarada and compañero can be (and often is) used with no political connotation.
- In Mongolian, the word is нөхөр (nökhör). It is still in use but less than before.
- The Nepali equivalent for comrade is kamrēḍ (कमरेड) or sāthī (साथी) as in Hindi. It is used by communists in Nepal such as the Communist Party of Nepal (Maoist Centre), Communist Party of Nepal (Unified Marxist–Leninist), Janamorcha Nepal and others.
- In Norwegian, the word is kamerat. It can be associated with communist usage, but more commonly refers simply to an associate, a co-worker (arbeidskamerat), or a classmate in school (klassekamerat or skolekamerat). In everyday use, the word kamerat on its own is considered a masculine term, referring to boys/men. For girls/women, the term venninne (female form of venn friend) is used instead. When joined with other words, such as klassekamerat, the word is gender neutral. (Although Norwegians would understand what is meant by klassevenninne, it would also sound awkward and somewhat archaic.)
- In the Philippines, communist and left-leaning activists prefer the term kasama (roughly, companion), and the short form, Ka before the name (e.g. Ka Bel). Protestant (usually Evangelical) clerics and members of the Iglesia ni Cristo also use Ka before names or nicknames, but as a contraction of kapatíd ("brother"/"sister"), denoting spiritual brotherhood. Practitioners of law informally use the Spanish terms compañero and compañera when referring to each other, albeit without any socio-political connotation.
- In the Pashto language, the word for comrade is malgury. It is used by and refers to communists, socialists, or supporters of the communist system across the Durand Line (i.e. in Afghanistan and Pakistan) by Pashto speakers. For the last decade or so it has also been used by the nationalists. The word is also used by common people both male and female for a very close friend.
- In Poland, the word is towarzysz, which has the same origin as the Russian word. In non-political sense, it means "companion".
- In Portugal and Brazil, the word is camarada, now being commonly employed to refer to communists or supporters of the communist system (result of the overusage of the term in the post-revolutionary society). It is also prevalent in the army, and has been gaining popularity among nationalist movements. The term used among socialist activists nowadays tends to be companheiro / companheira although in Portugal camarada is still commonly used. Brazilian president Lula is widely known for addressing his political mates and supporters as companheiro, however this decreased during the last years of his presidential term, while it was very popular during the elections, often imitated by comedians who satirized Lula's idiosyncratic manners. The terms camarada and companheiro(s)/companheira(s) are also used without political connotations, meaning "mate", "partner", "fella".
- In the Punjabi language the word for comrade is Sāthī (ਸਾਥੀ). However, the word "Comrade" itself, or ਕਾਮਰੇਡ (Kāmrēḍ), is used to refer to a communist or communist party member, and is often used as a more linguistically acceptable replacement for the word "communist," with the communist party often being called "The Comrades" or communist thought being called "ਕਾਮਰੇਡ ਸੋਚਣੀ" (Kāmrēḍ Sōcaṇī).
- In the Romani language the word for comrade is Dosti as seen in the phrase Te vestinel o dosti Tito, te vestinena o jugoslovenske manusha or Long live comrade Tito and long live the Yugoslav people.
- In Romanian the exact translation is camarad, a neologism introduced from French in the 19th century, which does not bear a political connotation, referring mainly to wartime allies and friends. During the communist era an older term, tovarăș, derived from a Slavic source, was used to convey the political meaning.
- The Serbo-Croatian equivalent for comrade is drug (друг) for males and drugarica (другарица) for females; it's also a regular and colloquial word for "friend", although largely replaced by prijatelj and prijateljica in standard varieties of the language. Communist Party/League of Communists of Yugoslavia promoted the use of the term between the members and generally among the society throughout existence of the Socialist Yugoslavia, from World War II in early 1940s to Yugoslav Wars in early 1990s. It was not unusual to hear political leaders referring to their audience as drugarice i drugovi. Its intention was to emphasize empathy and equality, and it is still used by the most fervocious adherents of leftist ideologies.
- The Slovak word for comrade is súdruh (m.) and súdružka (f.). The term kamarát is used too, but it is normally translated as friend.
- The Slovenian word for comrade is tovariš (m.) and tovarišica (f.), first attested in the 16th century. After the Second World War it was also colloquially used for "teacher" (as an elliptical form of the official tovariš učitelj (m.) and tovarišica učiteljica (f.) "comrade teacher"). After 1991 it rapidly fell out of use as a general term of address, but is still used when expressing comradeship among individuals.
- The Sindhi word for comrade is Saṅgat, سنگت; it is normally translated as friend.
- The Somali word for comrade is jaalle; it is normally translated as friend. It was widely used by the erstwhile Somali Revolutionary Socialist Party (1969–1991). The word fell out of use after the fall of the Somali Revolutionary Socialist Party.
- In Spain, the word is compañero (m.) / compañera (f.) ("companion"); the term camarada ("comrade") has also been used, but it is more associated with the communist and Falange tradition. In Spain the word compañero can be (and often is) used with no political connotation.
  - The standard form in Cuba is compañero / compañera, as it was in socialist Nicaragua and Chile. In some parts of Latin America, camarada is the more frequent word, except in Peru, where the term is commonly associated with the nom de guerre of members of far left groups Shining Path and MRTA, while members of the social-democrat party APRA as well as other left parties or left-leaning organizations employ compañero to refer to fellow members. The term camarada is the more normal among Spanish Communists.
  - In Chile, much like as in Italy, camarada has traditionally been used by its army, and historically by fascist groups, such as the National Socialist Movement of Chile, while compañero is commonplace within far-left wing groups and the Socialist and Communist parties.
- In Sinhala, the word is සහෝදරයා sahōdarayā, which literally means brother.
- In Swahili, the equivalent word is ndugu for brother-in-arms, or dada for a female comrade. The word ndugu is still used in formerly socialist Tanzania as a way of showing (political) solidarity.
- The Swedish word is kamrat. Although it can be associated with communist usage, it can equally well refer simply to a friend, a co-worker (arbetskamrat), or a classmate in school (klasskamrat or skolkamrat). Unlike the corresponding Norwegian word, the term is commonly used for both boys and girls in non-communist usage. See also Idrottsföreningen Kamraterna
- The Tamil word for comrade is Tōḻar (தோழர்) and is a regular word for "friend".
- In Tetun, the national language of Timor Leste, the word camarada is used – a direct loan from the language of the former colonial power, Portugal. During the 1970s the word was a common term of address within the left-leaning Fretilin party, and after the Indonesian invasion, continued to be used by the Fretilin associated guerrillas waging a war of resistance in the jungle. Though largely falling out of use since 1999 Fretilin politicians and veterans of the guerrillas struggle continue to use the term to refer to each other.
- The Thai word sahai (สหาย) was used in the communist movement.
- The Turkish word yoldaş (literally "co-traveller") has become used within the communist movement, yol meaning "way" and "cause". Ottoman Janissaries used to call each other yoldaş (یولداش "comrade") or yoldaşân (یولداشان, plural: "comrades"). Turkish communists, being morally affected by Bektashi values of the older era, adopted this term. In the climate of harsh anticommunist repression the word largely disappeared from common usage. Yoldaş is also a male name in Turkish.
- In Ukraine comrade was still the standard form of address in the armed forces and police until October 2018, when it was changed into "sir" (Ukrainian: пан, romanized: pan) by law.
- In the United Kingdom, political use of the term comrade is strongly associated with both Communism and, historically, Fascism. However it is still used as an informal form of address among some Labour Party members, and in a more serious manner by many smaller parties of the left. Use of the term is generally restricted to people with whom the speaker agrees politically. It is usually written in full, the abbreviation Cde being associated with southern African usage. The honorific terms sister and brother, also declining in usage, are more politically inclusive, encompassing everyone from the centre-left to the far-left, without necessarily indicating complete political agreement. All three terms are occasionally used in a mocking or patronising manner by political opponents. On the far right, comrade was the standard form of address between members of the British Union of Fascists and featured widely in their publications and marching songs.
- In the United States, the word comrade carries a strong connotation with Communism, Marxism–Leninism, and the former Soviet Union. Especially during the Cold War, to address someone as "comrade" marked either the speaker, person addressed, or both as suspected communist sympathizers. It is frequently used ironically in that way. In addition, it is still used in its generic context by some American socialists. Despite this, it has been adopted into the U.S. Army Soldier's Creed in the statement "I will never leave a fallen comrade". It is also used at meetings of the Veterans of Foreign Wars to address a fellow member.
- The Vietnamese word is đồng chí, which is derived from Chinese 同志. Due to the influence of Chinese revolutionary groups during the early 20th century on the Vietnamese independence movement, its usage was first seen among members of the Kuomintang-backed Vietnamese Nationalist Party and then later spread to members of the Vietnamese Communist Party. It is still being used openly in public to address state and Communist Party leaders as well as among soldiers and military officers in the Army.
