= Georges Ibrahim Abdallah =

Lebanese militant (born 1951)

- جورج إبراهيم عبد الله
- Born: Georges Ibrahim Abdallah; 2 April 1951 (age 75); Al-Qoubaiyat, Lebanon
- Organization: Lebanese Armed Revolutionary Factions (LARF)
- Known for: Convicted for the murders of Charles R. Ray and Yacov Bar-Simantov
- Relatives: Chloé Delaume (niece)
- Honors: Honorary resident of Bagnolet (2013, later revoked)
- Status: Imprisoned in Lannemezan, France (Released on July 25th 2025)
- Penalty: Life imprisonment (A French court ordered his release on 16-11-2024 to be freed on 6-12-2024 but was freed on 25-7-2025)
- Other names: Salih al-Masri, Abdu-Qadir Saadi
- Occupations: Militant, School Teacher

Georges Ibrahim Abdallah (Arabic: جورج إبراهيم عبد الله, born 2 April 1951) is a Lebanese former militant and founder of the Lebanese Armed Revolutionary Factions (LARF). He was convicted of terrorism and served 41 years of a life sentence at Lannemezan prison, France, for complicity in the 1982 assassination of Charles R. Ray and Yacov Bar-Simantov, and was released in July 2025.

On 15 November 2024, a French court ordered to release him on 6 December 2024 on the condition that he would leave France. The state prosecution appealed the order.

On 17 July 2025, the Court of Appeal of Paris ordered his release, to be followed by an immediate expulsion to Lebanon. This was carried out on 25 July 2025.

Described by his lawyer as "the man who has spent the longest time in prison for events linked to the Israeli-Palestinian conflict," Abdallah served 41 years in French custody, reportedly longer than any Palestinian prisoner has served in Israel, including those condemned to life imprisonment, according to Le Monde.

== Early life and militancy ==
Georges Ibrahim Abdallah, a Maronite Christian, was born on 2 April 1951, in the predominantly Maronite town of Al Qoubaiyat in northern Lebanon.

He worked as a secondary school teacher and was also a member of the Syrian Social Nationalist Party (SSNP).

He was wounded in 1978 during Israel's 1978 invasion of Lebanon. That year, he joined the Popular Front for the Liberation of Palestine (PFLP), and the following year, in 1979, he formed the Lebanese Armed Revolutionary Faction (LARF), alongside some of his relatives. The organization was composed of Maronites who had been trained by the PFLP. The LARF conducted five attacks, including four in France in 1981 and 1982. The group was in contact with other far-left militant organizations in Europe such as the Action Directe of France, the Red Brigades of Italy and the Red Army Faction of Germany.

== Arrest ==
In early April 1984, police discovered a cache of weapons in his Paris hideout, including a Czech-made 7.65-caliber pistol, 55 pounds of explosives, rockets, submachine guns, and other arms.

On 24 October 1984, he entered a police station in Lyon, asking to be protected from Mossad killers who he claimed were on his trail. He was arrested on charges related to the possession of fraudulent Algerian and Maltese passports, involvement in a criminal conspiracy, and the illegal possession of weapons and explosives.

Abdallah was sentenced to life in prison in 1987 for complicity in the 1982 murder of Lieutenant Colonel Charles R. Ray, an assistant US military attaché, and the murder of Israeli diplomat Yaakov Bar-Simantov outside his home in Paris on 3 April 1982, as well as involvement in the attempted assassination of former American consul in Strasbourg Robert O. Homme, on 26 March 1984. The murders were conducted in retaliation for American and Israeli involvement in fighting the Palestinian armed organizations in Lebanon followed by Israel's occupation of Lebanon in June 1982, and the LARF claimed responsibility for the assassinations.

Abdallah was imprisoned in France. While imprisoned he released communiqués in solidarity with prisoners from other Communist groups, such as Ahmad Saadat, Action Directe and GRAPO.

After his capture, he testified "I do what I do because of the injustice done to human rights where Palestine is concerned."

== Appeals for release ==
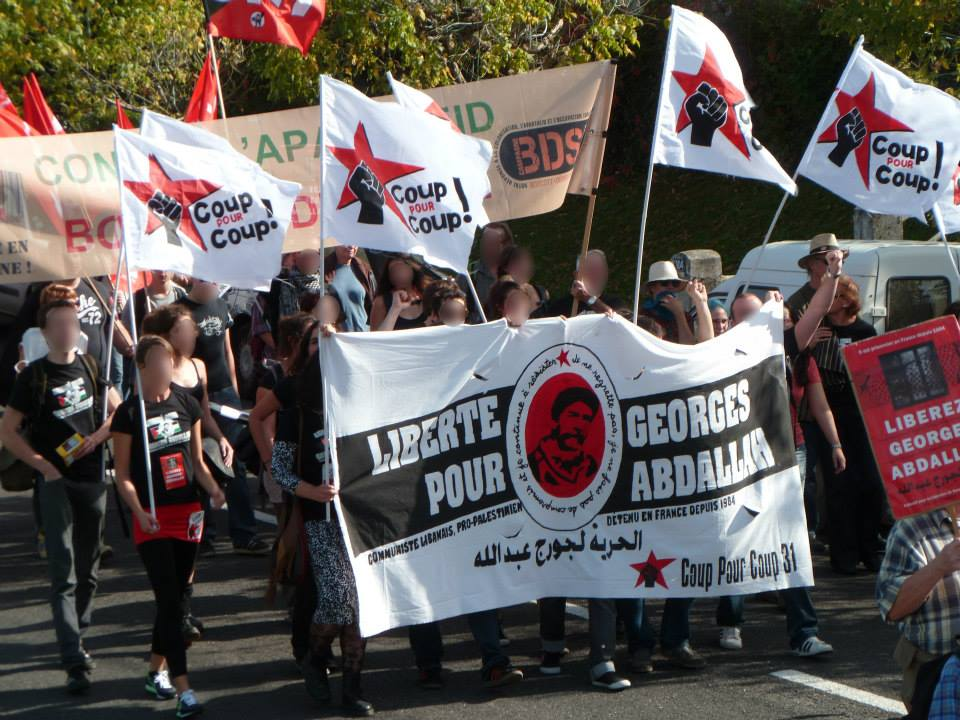
Protest for the release of Abdallah in 2013

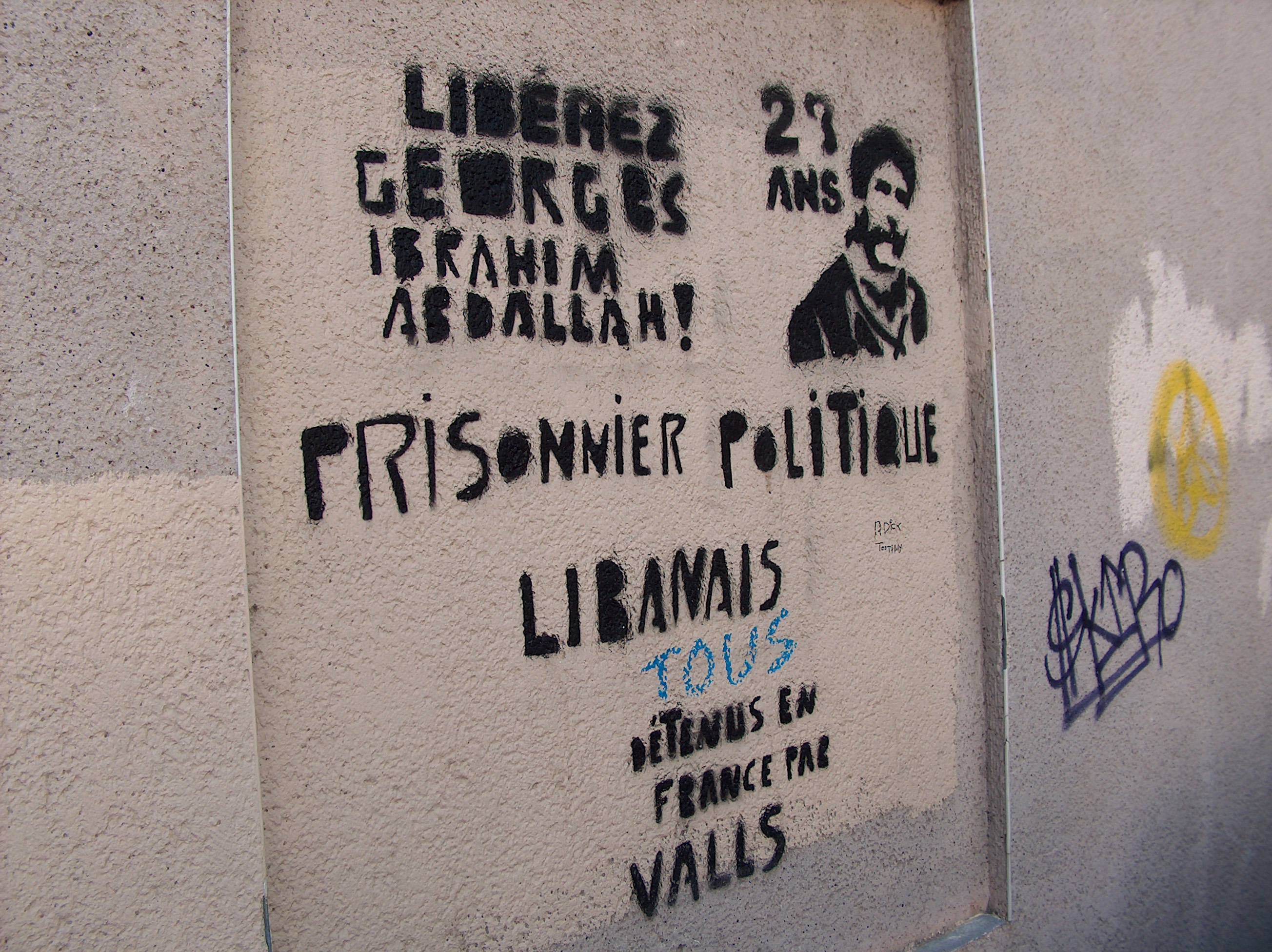
Demand for the release of Georges Ibrahim Abdallah, graffiti.

In 1999, Abdallah completed the minimum portion of his life sentence, but several requests for parole were denied. In 2003, the court granted him parole but the US Department of State objected to the court decision. Dominique Perben, the Minister of Justice at the time, made an appeal against the release.

Every two years Abdallah had the right to ask for a new release date, which had been refused more than five times. In 2009, the Court of Appeal of Paris relied on the 2008 "Loi Dati" for the prevention of reoffending to refuse his release.

On 10 January 2013, Abdallah was granted parole on appeal by the Chamber of Sentences Application of Paris on the condition of an order of deportation from France. Abdallah's lawyer said that his client hopes to return to Lebanon and take up a teaching job. Victoria Nuland, spokeswoman of the US State Department, declared to the press the US government's objection to his release on 11 January 2013. The United States ambassador to France, Charles Rivkin also objected."

14 January 2013 was the scheduled date for Abdallah to return to Lebanon after almost 30 years of imprisonment in France. However, Manuel Valls, the Minister of the Interior, refused to sign an administrative paper for deporting Abdallah. As a result of Valls's refusal, court proceedings took place on 15 January 2013. The prosecutor, under the Minister of Justice's authority, made a second appeal against his release (the first appeal was in November 2012). A complaint was sent in June 2013 against France to the investigators of the Working Group on Arbitrary Detention. Another complaint was sent to the French Supreme Court against Valls for not signing the administrative paper necessary for Abdallah's release.

During the Gaza war hostage crisis, a delegation from the Lebanese Communist Party met with the Hamas leadership in Lebanon and at the end of the meeting handed over an official letter to the Hamas leadership, in which the party asked the Hamas leadership to adopt the issue of the release of Georges Ibrahim Abdallah in any future exchange deal.

On 15 November 2024, a French court ordered that he be released on 6 December of that year, on the condition that he would leave France. The state prosecution appealed against the order. On 17 July 2025, the Court of Appeal of Paris ordered his release, to be followed by an immediate expulsion to Lebanon. The decision was carried out on 25 July. Although no official reception was organized, he was greeted in Beirut by a crowd of supporters, including members of Parliament, waving Palestinian and Lebanese Communist Party flags and banners referring to him as a "freedom fighter." In public remarks, he called for Arab solidarity with Gaza and declared that Israel was "living the last chapters of its existence." There was no official response from the United States or Israel regarding his release.

Abdallah was described by his lawyer as "the man who has spent the longest time in prison for events linked to the Israeli-Palestinian conflict". He served 41 years in French custody, reportedly longer than any Palestinian prisoner has served in Israel, including those sentenced to life imprisonment, according to Le Monde.

== Personal life ==
He is the uncle of Chloé Delaume.

== Honors ==
In December 2013, the French city of Bagnolet (an eastern suburb of Paris) voted to make Abdallah an "honorary resident." The city council's motion described him as a "communist activist" and a "political prisoner" who "belongs to the resistance movement of Lebanon" and is a "determined defender of the Palestinian just cause." In July 2014, the administrative court in Montreuil revoked the city's motion to grant Abdallah honorary citizenship.
