= Arab Communist Organization =

The Arab Communist Organization (ACO) (Arabic: المنظمة الشيوعية العربية | Munazzamatu al-Shuyu'i al-Arabi) or Organisation Communiste Arabe (OCA) in French was a short-lived, underground militant group which operated briefly in both Lebanon and Syria during the mid-1970s.

== Origins ==
Of unknown strength and apparently led by a trio of Syrian radical activists – Imad Shiha, Haytham Na'al and Faris Murad – the ACO was formed in Lebanon in August 1974, and its membership presumably included both Lebanese leftist militants and left-wing Syrian anti-Baathist dissidents.

== Political beliefs ==
Although ostensibly Marxist-Leninist in ideology and seemingly based in Lebanon, the ACO's own activities in the Middle East do not reveal a clearly devised strategy or objectives.

== Activities ==
The group focused mainly on bomb attacks and extortion attempts targeting American and British civilian and economic interests in Lebanon, at times claiming that its actions were either carried out in protest for US Secretary of State Henry Kissinger's 1974 diplomatic Middle Eastern Tour or to force British-owned Lebanese companies to distribute freely large amounts of food to impoverished local families. It is still unclear who financed and armed the ACO though the most likely suspect at the time would have been the Palestinians (either the mainstream PLO or the Rejectionist Front factions), who certainly provided weapons, explosives and training at their Bekaa Valley facilities. When the Lebanese Civil War finally broke out in April 1975, it seems that the group opted for not joining the Lebanese National Movement (LNM) and took no part in the savage street battles at Beirut and elsewhere. Instead, they shifted their attention to Syria, where their leaders were arrested and tortured in July that year and then sentenced to life in prison by Syrian courts.

== Decline and demise ==
Although the ACO promptly carried out a series of bombings in Damascus in retaliation for the arrests, Syrian and Lebanese Authorities succeeded in dismantling the group's cells in both Syria and Lebanon, which resulted in the sharp decline of their activities afterwards. The group's last known attack took place in 1977, and nothing was heard of them until August 2002 when Damascus finally bowed to the pressure of international Human Rights organizations and released Haytham Na'al on reasons of ill-health resulting from torture suffered while in prison – his comrade Imad Shiha was released in 2004 and Faris Murad, as well as several other former ACO militants, remain however in custody. This faction is no longer active.

== See also ==
- Lebanese Communist Party
- Lebanese Armed Revolutionary Factions
- Organization of Communist Action in Lebanon
- Popular Guard
