= Killing of Yacov Barsimantov =

1982 political assassination

Assassination of Yaacov Bar-Simantov
- Location: 17 Avenue Ferdinand Buisson, Boulogne-Billancourt, France
- Date: 31 March 1982
- Target: Yaacov Bar-Simantov
- Attack type: Assassination
- Weapon: 7.65 mm semiautomatic pistol
- Deaths: 1 (Yaacov Bar-Simantov)
- Perpetrator: Lebanese Armed Revolutionary Factions
- Accused: Georges Ibrahim Abdallah

On 31 March 1982, Yaacov Bar-Simantov, who was the second secretary of Israel's embassy in France, was shot dead in the Parisian suburb of Boulogne-Billancourt by an unknown female assailant.

Barsimantov was responsible for liaison with the French National Assembly and Senate and other political organizations.

At 12:50, a young woman wearing a white beret approached the diplomat, who was accompanied by his wife and 8-year-old daughter, and shot him in the head three times with a 7.65 millimeter semiautomatic pistol in the lobby of their apartment building at 17 Avenue Ferdinand Buisson in Boulogne-Billancourt. His 17-year-old son, who heard the shots but did not witness the murder, chased the woman, who was able to flee into the Paris Metro. The diplomat was announced dead about two hours after the shooting. The Israeli Embassy stated that no particular security arrangements had been in effect for the diplomat, who had worked in Paris for a little over two years on his first foreign assignment. The shooting came three days after his office had been sprayed with machine-gun fire.

Responsibility for the murder was claimed by a group called the Lebanese Armed Revolutionary Factions. Israel accused the PLO of being involved and considered the murder a violation of the terms of the July 1981 ceasefire arranged by the United States after fighting in Lebanon. The PLO insisted that the cease-fire covered only actions taking place in Lebanon.

== Imprisonment of Georges Ibrahim Abdallah ==
Georges Abdallah, a Lebanese national, was sentenced to life in prison in 1987 for the 1982 murder of Lieutenant Colonel Charles R. Ray, an assistant US military attaché and murder of Bar-Simantov, as well as involvement in the attempted assassination of former American consul in Strasbourg Robert O. Homme, on 26 March 1984.

Abdallah was to be released by French judiciary authorities in 2013. A parole board had agreed to release Abdallah, 61, on condition that he would be expelled from France immediately. The French government did not follow on, preventing the parole.

In December 2013, the city council of Bagnolet declared Abdallah an "honorary resident," describing him as a "political prisoner" and "defender of the Palestinian just cause," without mentioning his involvement in the murders. In July 2014, the administrative court in Montreuil revoked this decision.

Abdallah was incarcerated in Lannemezan prison. On 15 November 2024, a court ordered to release him on 6 December on the condition that he would leave France. The state prosecutors appealed the ruling. On 17 July 2025, the Court of Appeal of Paris ordered his release, to be followed by an immediate expulsion to Lebanon. The decision was carried out on 25 July.
