= Leamon Hunt =

American diplomat (1927–1984)

- Born: October 7, 1927; Gibbs Twp, Johnston, Oklahoma, US
- Died: February 15, 1984 (aged 56); Rome, Italy
- Cause of death: Assassination by gunshot
- Resting place: Alexandria, Virginia, US
- Title: Director General of the Multinational Force and Observers
- Term: 1981–1984
- Successor: Viktor Dikeos
- Spouse: Joyce Conneally Hunt

Leamon R. Hunt (October 7, 1927 – February 15, 1984) was a American diplomat who became the first Director General of the international peacekeeping force, Multinational Force and Observers (MFO). He was assassinated by members of the Red Brigades in 1984.

== Career ==
Hunt served in several diplomatic posts in his career. He was the Deputy Chief of Mission for the US embassy in Lebanon and Deputy Assistant Secretary of State for Operations before his nomination as the first Director General of the MFO in July 1981. As part of his duties, Hunt appointed Norwegian Lieutenant General Fredrik V. Bull-Hansen to be the first Force Commander of the MFO. Hunt then established a temporary headquarters in Alexandria, VA and began designing the infrastructure for the group in Sinai. He also defined the hierarchical and logistical structures of the organization.

== Assassination ==
On February 15, 1984, at 6:45 p.m., Hunt arrived at his gated home in Rome. (Note: While some news reports originally claimed that Hunt was assassinated at a traffic light near his house, this was found to be false when multiple witnesses claimed that the attack had taken place at Hunt's house.) As he was waiting for the gate to open, three gunmen emerged from a Fiat 128 across the street and opened fire on Hunt's Alfa Romeo armored limousine with automatic weapons. While none of the rounds fired at the limousine penetrated, one gunman jumped on the trunk and fired into the upper edge of the rear window. One of the 7.65mm rounds broke through the rubber and metal window frame and struck Hunt in the skull. He was taken to a local hospital in Rome, where he died an hour later.

== Aftermath ==
Initially, the attack was claimed by both the Red Brigades and the Lebanese Armed Revolutionary Factions (LARF). A caller, claiming to be from the Red Brigades, called a Milan radio station shortly after the assassination, saying, "This is the Communist Party. We must claim the attempt on General Hunt, the guarantor of the Camp David agreements. The imperialist forces must leave Lebanon. Italy must leave NATO. No to the installations of missiles at Comiso." Evidence from the scene revealed the Red Brigades to have committed the assassination.

Kenneth Dam, Deputy Secretary of State, spoke on behalf of Secretary of State George Shultz. Dam said, "Ray Hunt died in the cause of peace. It is a cruel irony that, like many others who devoted their lives to the highest aspirations of mankind, he was the victim of evil terrorism which haunts our world today. The full and successful life of service which Ray Hunt led, and the sacrifice he made, should inspire us to rededicate ourselves to building a more peaceful world in which hatred and violence have no place." President Ronald Reagan also commented on Hunt's death, saying that he represented "the best in America". Hunt was flown from Rome to Andrews Field for the funeral, and was interred at a church in Alexandria on February 21.
