= Causette =

French monthly feminist magazine

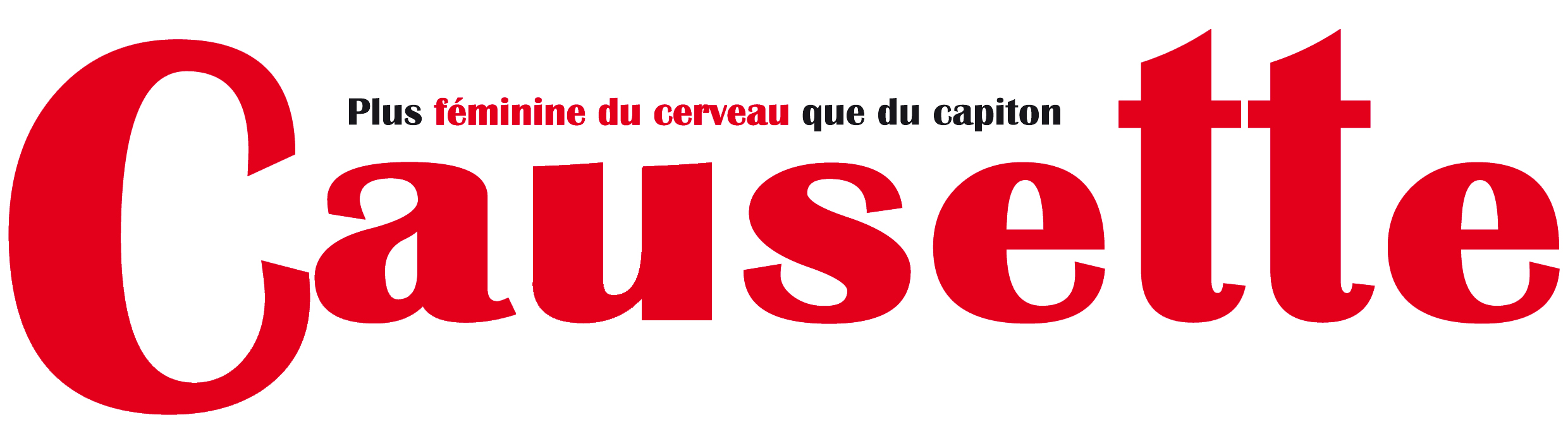
- Categories: Feminist magazine
- Frequency: Monthly
- Founder: Gregory Lassus-Debat, Gilles Bonjour
- Founded: 2009
- First issue: 7 March 2009
- Final issue: October 2023 (print); 6 June 2024 (online)
- Country: France
- Language: French
- ISSN: 2100-9791

Causette was a French monthly feminist magazine, created by Éditions Gynéthic, an independent publishing house founded in January 2009 by Gregory Lassus-Debat and Gilles Bonjour. It was later acquired by Causette Media, a subsidiary of the Hildegarde group. The magazine's print edition ceased with issue No. 148, dated October 2023, and Causette became an exclusively online publication. Causette was placed in court-ordered liquidation on June 6, 2024.

== Editorial content ==
Its motto is "more brain than cellulite." Its editorial approach favors investigative journalism, on-the-ground reporting, profiles, and interviews over genre staples, all delivered with humor and an offbeat tone. According to The Times, which hails it as a "symbol of the French feminist renaissance," "Causette breaks all the rules of the French women's press."

The magazine identifies as feminist without wishing to be confined to a stereotypical image of the term.

== History ==
=== Creation and first years ===
The newspaper released its first issue on Saturday, March 7, 2009, on the eve of International Women's Day. According to its founder, the newspaper's start-up funds came from a consumer loan and a financial contribution from Gilles Bonjour's family. According to its co-founder and publisher Gregory Lassus-Debat (for whom this is his first experience running a company), the magazine aims to view women not as consumers but as "social beings endowed with intelligence and subjectivity, interested in the world around them and keen to have a good time". This first issue features a profile of Fadela Amara, another of an elderly sex worker, and a report on the Democratic Republic of the Congo.

The magazine was initially a bimonthly publication before becoming a monthly in 2011.

=== 2012–2013: development of the magazine ===
In February 2012, Causette became the first women's magazine to be recognized as a "political and general news publication" by the Ministry of Culture and to become a member of the Presse et Pluralisme association.

On September 6, 2012, Causette was named "Best Press Magazine" of the year by the jury of the CBnews Grand Prix des Médias.

On December 19, 2012, Causette won its first lawsuit following the dismissal of the defamation summons initiated by Rémi Pauvros, the mayor of Maubeuge. The magazine had reported that incidents involving the gang rape of a staff member working for the mayor had not been reported to the public prosecutor's office, as the mayor was legally required to do.

On April 24, 2013, Causette received the "Coup de Cœur" award—awarded unanimously by the jury—in the "Magazine of the Year" competition organized by the Syndicat des éditeurs de la presse magazine.

=== 2013: controversies and social tensions ===
In June 2013, the magazine published an article that sparked criticism regarding a case of sexual assault on a minor under the age of 15; Causette was accused of a sexist leniency toward female pedophilia. The magazine subsequently issued an apology.

In September 2013, Gregory Lassus-Debat's management style was widely criticized and the newspaper's staff wrote a letter "signed by all employees and freelancers" to denounce his "management by fear." The atmosphere was very bad in the magazine team: there were several departures and the labor inspectorate opened an investigation. The newspaper having experienced good growth in its sales, it seems that the pressure on employees had increased over time. The way in which Gregory Lassus-Debat, 31 years old at the time, ran the newspaper was highly contested; he was considered quick to anger, "suspicious", "managing everything with affect." While he did not officially hold the position of editorial director, journalists complained of his interventionism on the articles that he ordered, corrected and modified. Gregory Lassus-Debat explained that these were interpersonal problems and recalled that having founded Causette and "invented its editorial line" he considered himself capable of continuing to direct it.

In November 2013, a new controversy broke out after an anti-prostitution feature and in particular an article entitled "55 reasons to resist temptation". This was an article listing, in a humorous manner, the reasons for not using prostitutes. Feminist activists considered this article insulting and contemptuous of prostitutes. The Sex Work Union (STRASS) published a press release on its site in which it accused the magazine of "whorephobia", "sexism", "incitement to rape" and "racism." The magazine Les Inrockuptibles deplored at the end of October 2013 the absence of explanations given by Causette during this controversy. A journalist explained in 2014 that "no one took responsibility for these jokes" and that members of the editorial team tried in vain to prevent their publication but that Gregory Lassus-Debat had insisted that the article appear. Grégory Lassus-Debat explained that it was "irony through antiphrasis."

This controversy did not improve the atmosphere within the newspaper. A motion of no confidence in the editor-in-chief and a strike were voted for in November 2013, and mediation was conducted by the National Union of Journalists, which noted a certain lack of rigor on the part of the newspaper's management.

=== Since 2014 ===
In March 2014, to mark its fifth anniversary, Causette published the book La Guerre Invisible : Révélation sur les violences sexuelles dans l'armée française (co-published by Les Arènes and Causette). Causette assigned two of its journalists, Julia Pascual and Leila Minano, to this investigation, which lasted nearly two years. Immediately following the book's publication, the French Ministry of Defence launched an internal investigation within the army.

In April 2015, the monthly publication received the "Magazine of the Year" award in the "Passion" category from the jury of the Syndicat des Éditeurs de Presse Magazine. However, just days later, it was placed under court-ordered receivership. The magazine was suffering from a €600,000 deficit caused by lost revenue from two issues that were not released during the 2014 strike, the cost of the mutually agreed contract terminations that followed the dispute, and serious accounting errors made by the external firm responsible for the magazine's accounts.

In March 2015, according to the news site BuzzFeed, Gynethic—the publishing company behind Causette—was found liable for the psychological harassment of one of its employees, Anne-Laure Pineau; this ruling was upheld at the initial hearing on June 23, 2016. In addition to this finding, the company was held liable for a "breach of the obligation to ensure safety" (specifically, an obligation to achieve a guaranteed safety outcome), a legal concept referring to an employer's failure to take the necessary measures to protect an employee's health.

In January 2017, Iris Deroeux, then correspondent for Mediapart in New York, was appointed editor-in-chief of a newspaper whose sales had been falling sharply since June 2016. Sales increased in the following months, but in October 2017, suffering from "serious financial difficulties", notably due to chronic operating debt amounting to 0.5 to 2 million euros depending on the sources, Causette launched an appeal for donations from its readers. The magazine's sales fell by 20% in one year, while 95% of its turnover is linked to newsstand sales and subscriptions. More than €100,000 was raised, while sales had been on the rise since May 2017.

=== Bankruptcy filing, brand controversy and title resumption, second bankruptcy filing ===
The newspaper filed for insolvency for the first time on December 15, 2017. In early 2018, the Paris Commercial Court authorized the magazine to continue operations until the end of February, pending a takeover proposal.

The takeover was complicated by the fact that "the Causette brand does not belong to Éditions Gynéthic—the company that publishes the magazine and is the subject of legal proceedings. It is owned by co-founder and manager Grégory Lassus-Debat, who does not wish to part with it". The publication's team intended to file a complaint against Grégory Lassus-Debat for misuse of corporate assets and receiving the proceeds of such misuse, alleging that he transferred the brand to himself personally in 2011, thereby allowing him to subsequently lease it to the publishing company for an annual fee that reached, for instance, €108,000 in 2016–2017.

Following the judgment of the Paris commercial court, Causette magazine was taken over by the Hildegarde group, chaired by Réginald de Guillebon, on March 7, 2018.

The magazine discontinued its print edition in the autumn of 2023, citing rising costs, and focused entirely on its online publication. However, this move was not enough to turn the magazine's finances around, and it filed for bankruptcy on May 22, 2024. Causette was placed in court-ordered liquidation on June 6, with the magazine's operations and its journalists' work halting immediately pending a potential buyer. The website ceased to be updated as of June 6.

In July 2024, Melody Madar, founder of the women's media Les Éclaireuses, took over Causette magazine with the ambition of developing the media and finding new monetization solutions.

On January 24, 2025, the Paris Court of Appeal overturned an earlier decision by the Commercial Court regarding the sale of Causette magazine to Melody Madar. This ruling followed an appeal filed by de Guillebon, who challenged the award process. The primary ground for the reversal was that Madar had allegedly modified her bid at the last minute—via an email sent to the court-appointed administrators the day before deliberations—without adhering to the adversarial principle. The Court of Appeal held that the sale included elements present in neither the initial tender specifications nor the original bid; this decision potentially paves the way for new buyers interested in acquiring the magazine.

== Circulation ==
According to the publisher, the first issue of Causette was released with a print run of 20,000 copies on March 7, 2009, on the eve of International Women's Day.

As early as 2010, the OJD certified the magazine's circulation figures. In 2013, total paid circulation stood at 67,208 copies per issue.

In March 2013, for its four years, 147,000 copies were printed and distributed in more than 17,000 points of sale throughout mainland France, Martinique, Guadeloupe, Réunion, Quebec, Switzerland, Belgium and Polynesia. It is also distributed via the Internet and in digital format. On March 21, 2013, Causette received an "OJD Star" in recognition of the highest percentage growth in sales between 2011 and 2012 (+44.1%).

On April 9, 2014, Causette received an "OJD star" to reward the best sales growth in volume between 2012 and 2013 (+28.1%). However, sales decreased by 11% in 2014, before increasing to around 67,000 monthly copies in the first quarter of 2015.
