= Lebanese Armed Revolutionary Factions =

Marxist-Leninist urban guerrilla group

Lebanese Armed Revolutionary Factions الفصائل المسلحة الثورية اللبنانية
- Leaders: Georges Ibrahim Abdallah, Robert Abdallah, Maurice Abdallah, Emile Abdallah
- Dates active: 1979–1988; 1990–2000
- Headquarters: Al-Qoubaiyat
- Active regions: Akkar District, South Lebanon; Paris
- Ideology: Marxism-Leninism
- Political position: Far-left
- Size: 130 men
- Part of: Jammoul; Lebanese National Salvation Front (LNSF)
- Wars: Lebanese Civil War

The Lebanese Armed Revolutionary Factions – LARF (Arabic: الفصائل المسلحة الثورية اللبنانية | Al Fasael al-Musallaha al-Thawriyya al-Lubnaniyya) was a small Marxist-Leninist urban guerrilla group which played an active role in the Lebanese Civil War between 1979 and 1988.

== Origins ==
Formed in 1979, the LARF emerged from the break-up of the Popular Front for the Liberation of Palestine – External Operations (PFLP-EO), a joint Lebanese/Palestinian revolutionary guerrilla faction, upon the assassination by the Israeli Mossad of its leader and founder Wadie Haddad in March 1978. In the 1980s it was responsible for a series of attacks on French, American, and Israeli secret services agents in Lebanon and Western Europe. LARF's leader, Georges Ibrahim Abdallah, was sentenced to life imprisonment in France in 1987, and the group's attacks ceased soon after.

== Structure and organization ==
Modelled after parent western militant leftist/urban guerrilla organizations, the LARF was made of left-wing Maronite Christian activists who had previously fought with the Palestine Liberation Organization (PLO), led by Georges Ibrahim Abdallah (noms de guerre "Salih al-Masri", "Abdul-Qadir Sa'adi"), a former school teacher; after being arrested by the French authorities in 1984, he was replaced by a collective leadership trio formed by his younger brothers' Robert, Maurice, and Emile. Based at his home town of Al-Qoubaiyat in the Akkar District of northern Lebanon and financed by Syria, the LARF aligned by 1981 some 30 active members specialized in urban guerrilla warfare, organized into scattered cells of three to five militants.

In addition to the Palestinians and Syria, the group forged close ties with other similar groups in Lebanon and abroad, such as the French 'Direct Action' (French: Action Directe), the Italian 'Red Brigades' (Italian: Brigate Rosse), and the Armenian Secret Army for the Liberation of Armenia (ASALA), and is also suspected of contacts with Hezbollah and other Iranian-backed elements.

== Activities in Europe, 1982–1988 ==
Despite its small size, the group not only joined both the Lebanese National Resistance Front (LNRF; Arabic acronym: Jammoul) and its successor, the Lebanese National Salvation Front (LNSF) in their guerrilla campaigns against Israel Defense Forces in southern Lebanon, but also played an active role outside the Middle East.

Between 1982 and 1987 they were held responsible for 18 bombings, political assassinations, and kidnappings targeting French, American and Israeli officials in both Lebanon and Western Europe. These include the assassinations in Paris of the assistant US military Attaché to the American embassy, Lieutenant colonel Charles R. Ray on January 18, 1982, followed on 3 April of that year by the Israeli diplomat Yaakov Barsimantov. The LARF was also allegedly behind the assassination of US citizen Leamon Hunt, the director of the multinational observer force in the Sinai on February 15, 1984 in Rome, as well as a failed attempt on March 24, 1984 on the US Consul-General in Strasbourg, Robert O. Homme, and the kidnapping late that year of the director of the French Cultural Center in Beirut, Gilles Peyroles.

Although the capture of Georges Abdallah by French authorities in late 1984 led to a temporary hiatus in LARF activities, it is believed that the group was behind a bombing campaign that rocked the French capital in September 1986, killing 15 people and wounding over 150 others. These bombings were carried out by the "Committee for Solidarity with Arab and Middle Eastern Political Prisoners – CSAPP" (Comité de soutien avec les prisonniers politiques et arabes et du Moyen-Orient), allegedly a covert 'working title' for an alliance that gathered the LARF, ASALA and pro-Iranian Islamic operatives. Led by the Shi'ite militant Fouad Ben Ali Saleh, it was formed in February 1986 at Paris with the aim of forcing the release of Abdallah from prison.

== Decline and demise, 1988–1990 ==
However, after Abdallah was sentenced by a French court to life imprisonment in March 1987 his group's actions in Europe sharply declined, and the subsequent disbandment of the CSAPP forced most of its members to return to Lebanon. By early 1988, the LARF had virtually ceased all external operational activity and it kept a low profile for the remainder of the Lebanese Civil War.

Military inactive since 1990, the group appears to have renounced violence and remains politically active in Lebanon, its members now campaigning for the release of Georges Abdallah (held in the Fresnes Prison since September 2002) and Fouad Ben Ali Saleh, along with other Lebanese prisoners still detained in French prisons.

== See also ==
- Arab Communist Organization
- Lebanese Civil War
- Lebanese Communist Party
- Lebanese National Salvation Front
- List of weapons of the Lebanese Civil War
- Organization of Communist Action in Lebanon
- People's Liberation Army (Lebanon)
- Popular Guard
