= Robert O. Homme =

American diplomat

Robert Onan Homme (born c. 1941) is an American former diplomat. A native of Duluth, Minnesota, he joined the United States Foreign Service in 1962 and served in Mexico, Colombia, Italy and Panama.

From 1975 to 1981, he was at the State Department in Washington in charge of the Common Market desk, then was director of personnel for Europe. He formerly served as the American Consul General in Strasbourg, France, since August 1981 and ambassador to Costa Rica from March to July 1993.

On 24 March 1984, at approximately 8:55 am, he was shot five times at close range as he left for work. He was admitted to Hautepierre Hospital for the wounds he received. The attack was carried out by a gunman who walked up to his car and fired a 7.65-millimeter revolver, police said. Police described the assailant who fired at Homme as a man in his 30s, of Asian or Mediterranean origin, wearing a beige overcoat. He fled the scene on a motorcycle. The Lebanese Armed Revolutionary Factions (LARF) claimed involvement in the attack.

He was married and has three children.
