= List of weapons of the Lebanese Civil War =

The Lebanese Civil War was a multi-sided military conflict that pitted a variety of local irregular militias, both Muslim and Christian, against each other between 1975 and 1990. A wide variety of weapons were used by the different armies and factions operating in the Lebanese Civil War. Combatants included:

- the leftist-Muslim militias of the Lebanese National Movement (LNM) coalition (1975–1982):
  - the Sunni Muslim Independent Nasserite Movement's Al-Mourabitoun militia (1975–1988)
  - the Sunni Muslim Popular Nasserist Organization's National Liberation Army (NLA) militia (1975–1991)
  - the Sunni Muslim Toilers League's Zafer el-Khatib Forces (ZKF) militia (1974–1991)
  - the Druze Progressive Socialist Party's People's Liberation Army (Druze PLA) militia (1975–1991)
  - the Sixth of February Movement militia (1975–1986)
  - the Union of Working People's Forces's (UWPF) Victory Divisions militia (1965–1990)
  - the Union of Working People's Forces-Corrective Movement's (UWPF-CM) Nasser's Forces militia (1975–1990)
  - the Communist Action Organization in Lebanon (OCAL) militia (1975–1991)
  - the Lebanese Communist Party's Popular Guard militia (1970–2000)
  - the Arab Socialist Action Party – Lebanon (ASAP–L) militia (1975–1991)
  - the Arab Socialist Ba'ath Party's Assad Battalion militia (1950–present)
  - the Socialist Arab Lebanon Vanguard Party (SALVP) militia (1966–present)
  - the Syrian Social Nationalist Party's (SSNP) Eagles of the Whirlwind militia (1932–present)
  - the Najjadeh Party militia (1936–present)
  - the Shia Muslim Knights of Ali militia (1967–1976)
  - the Muslim Lebanese Arab Army (LAA), dissident faction of the Lebanese Army (1976–1977)
- the rightist-Christian militias of the Lebanese Front coalition (1976–1980):
  - the Christian Kataeb Regulatory Forces (KRF) militia (1961–1980)
  - the Christian Al-Tanzim militia (1969–1990)
  - the Christian Guardians of the Cedars (GoC) militia (1974–2000)
  - the Christian Tigers Militia (a.k.a. Al-Noumour, Noumour Al-Ahrar, Noumours, NLP Tigers) militia (1968–1991)
  - the Christian Zgharta Liberation Army (ZLA, a.k.a. Al-Marada, Marada Brigade, Mardaite Brigade) militia (1967–1991)
  - the Christian Tyous Team of Commandos (TTC, a.k.a. "Tyous" for short, also translated as the "Stubborn Ones" or "Les Têtus", "Les Obstinés") militia (1975–1985)
  - the Christian Lebanese Youth Movement (LYM, a.k.a. Maroun Khoury Group – MKG) militia (1969–1977)
  - the Christian Young Men militia (1978–1986)
  - the Christian Zahliote Group (ZG, a.k.a. Groupement Zahliote – GZ) militia (1975–1981)
  - the Christian Shuraya Party's Assyrian Battalion militia (1978–1981)
  - the Christian Maronite Monks militia (1975–1980)
  - the Christian Maronite League militia (1952–present)
  - the Christian Army of Free Lebanon (AFL), dissident faction of the Lebanese Army (1976–1978)
  - the Druze Vanguard of the Maani Army (Movement of the Druze Jihad) (VMA–MDJ) militia (1976–1978)
- the Christian Lebanese Forces militia (LF), successor of the Lebanese Front and the KRF militia (1977–1994)
- the Christian Lebanese Forces – Executive Command (LFEC) militia, dissident faction of the LF (1985–1991)
- the Kurdish Democratic Party – Lebanon (KDP-L) militia (1975–1991)
- the Armenian Secret Army for the Liberation of Armenia (ASALA) urban guerrilla group (1975–1991)
- the Alawite Arab Democratic Party's Arab Red Knights (ARK) militia (1981–1991)
- the Shia Muslim Amal Movement militia (1975–present)
- the Shia Muslim Islamic Jihad Organization (IJO) urban guerrilla group (1983–1992)
- the Shia Muslim Hezbollah guerrilla group (1985–present)
- the Sunni Muslim Islamic Unification Movement (IUM, a.k.a. Al-Tawheed) militia (1982–present)
- the United Nasserite Organization (UNO) guerrilla group (1986–1991)
- the Lebanese Armed Revolutionary Factions (LARF) urban guerrilla group (1979–1988)
- the Lebanese Liberation Front (LLF) urban guerrilla group (1987–1989)
- the Popular Revolutionary Resistance Organization (PRRO) urban guerrilla group (1987–1990)
- the Front for the Liberation of Lebanon from Foreigners (FLLF) Israeli-backed urban guerrilla group (1980–1983)
- the Liberation Battalion urban guerrilla group (1987–1988)
- the Sons of the South (SotS) guerrilla group (1983–1995)
- the South Lebanon Army (SLA) militia (1978–2000)
- the official Lebanese Armed Forces (LAF) and the Internal Security Forces (ISF), led by the Lebanese government
- the mainstream Palestinian guerrilla factions of the Palestine Liberation Organization (PLO) and the breakaway Rejectionist Front (present in Lebanon from 1968 to 1983)
- the Palestine Liberation Army (present in Lebanon from 1976 to 1990)
- the Syrian Arab Armed Forces (present in Lebanon from 1976 to 2005)
- the Israel Defense Forces (IDF) (present in Lebanon from 1978 to 2000)
- in between, a plethora of irregular Lebanese armed groups that emerged from the wrecks of both the LNM and the Lebanese Front alliances, after their collapse in the early 1980s.

== Weapons and equipment ==
The list below comprises all the weapons and equipment employed by the LNM, Lebanese Front, LAA, AFL, LF, IUM, Hezbollah, Al-Mourabitoun, NLA, Druze PLA, SLA, LAF, ISF, and lesser Lebanese groups (please note: the Syrian Army, PLO, Palestinian PLA and IDF are not included on this list).

=== Pistols and revolvers ===
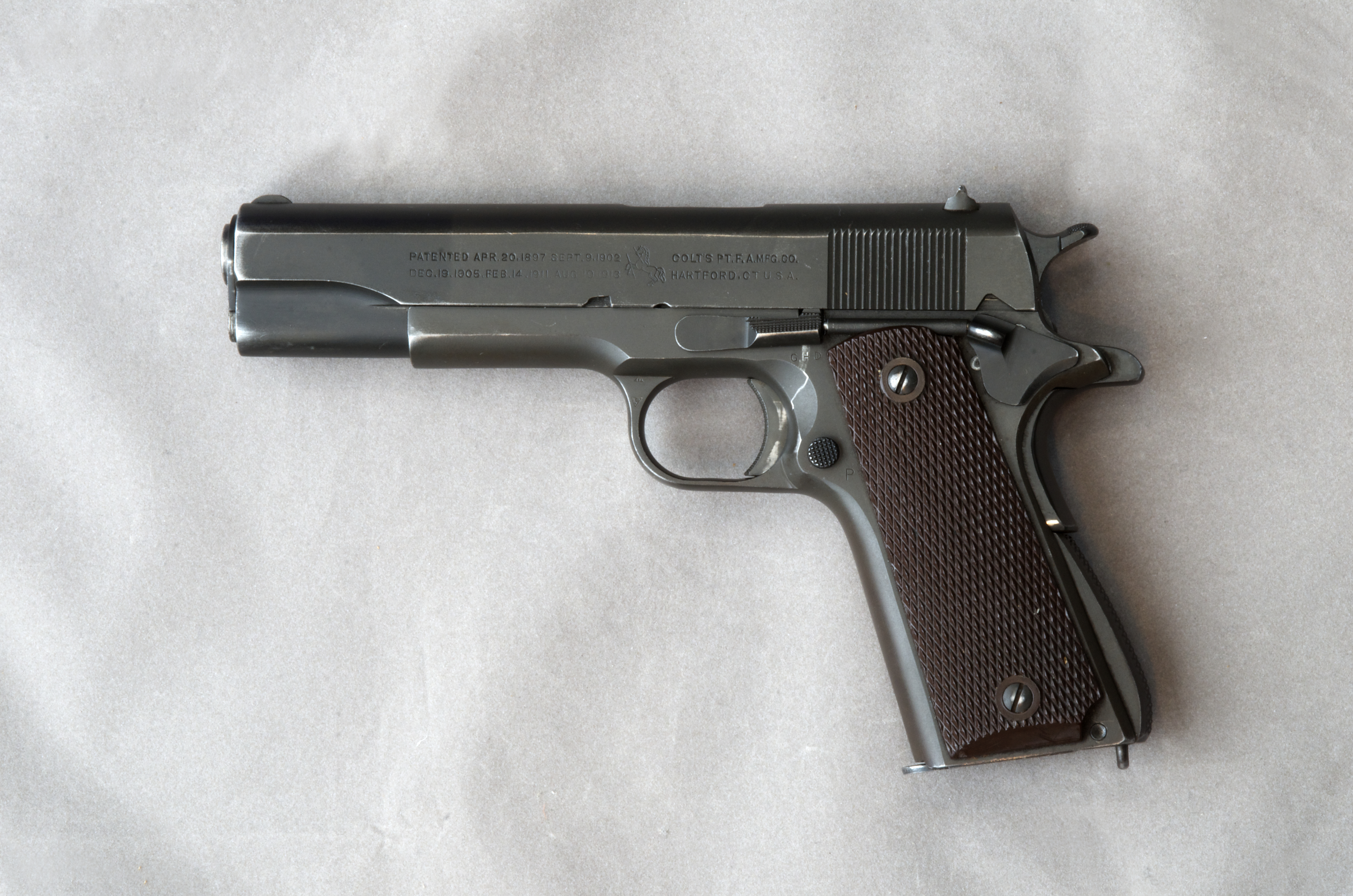
Colt M1911A1 pistol

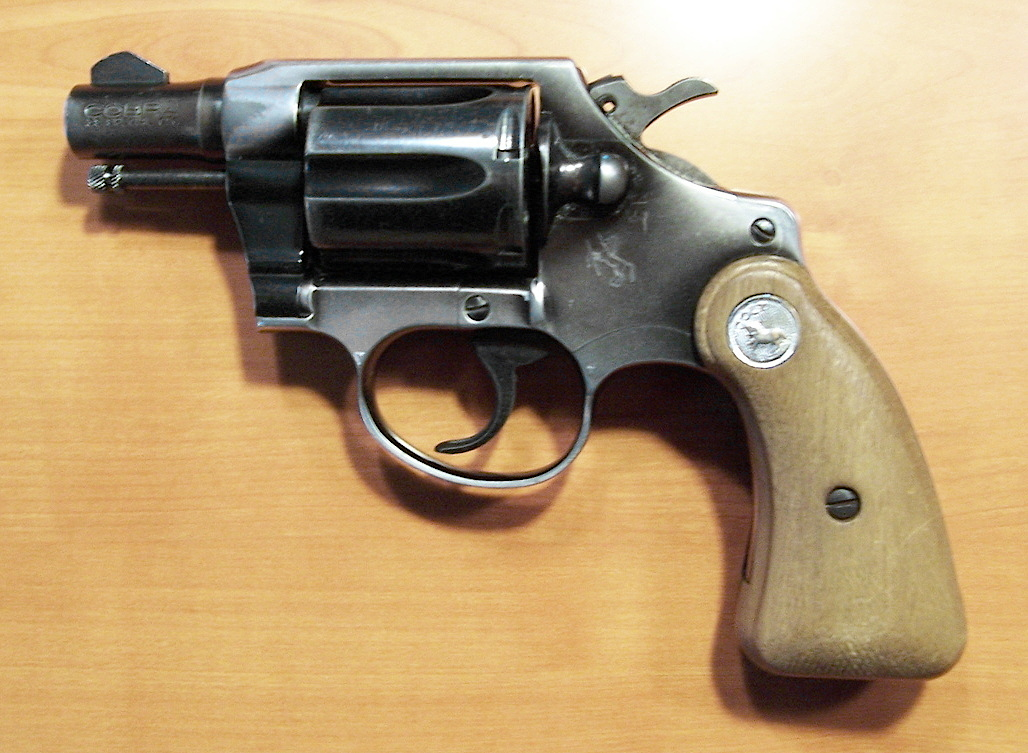
Colt Cobra .38 Special snub-nose revolver

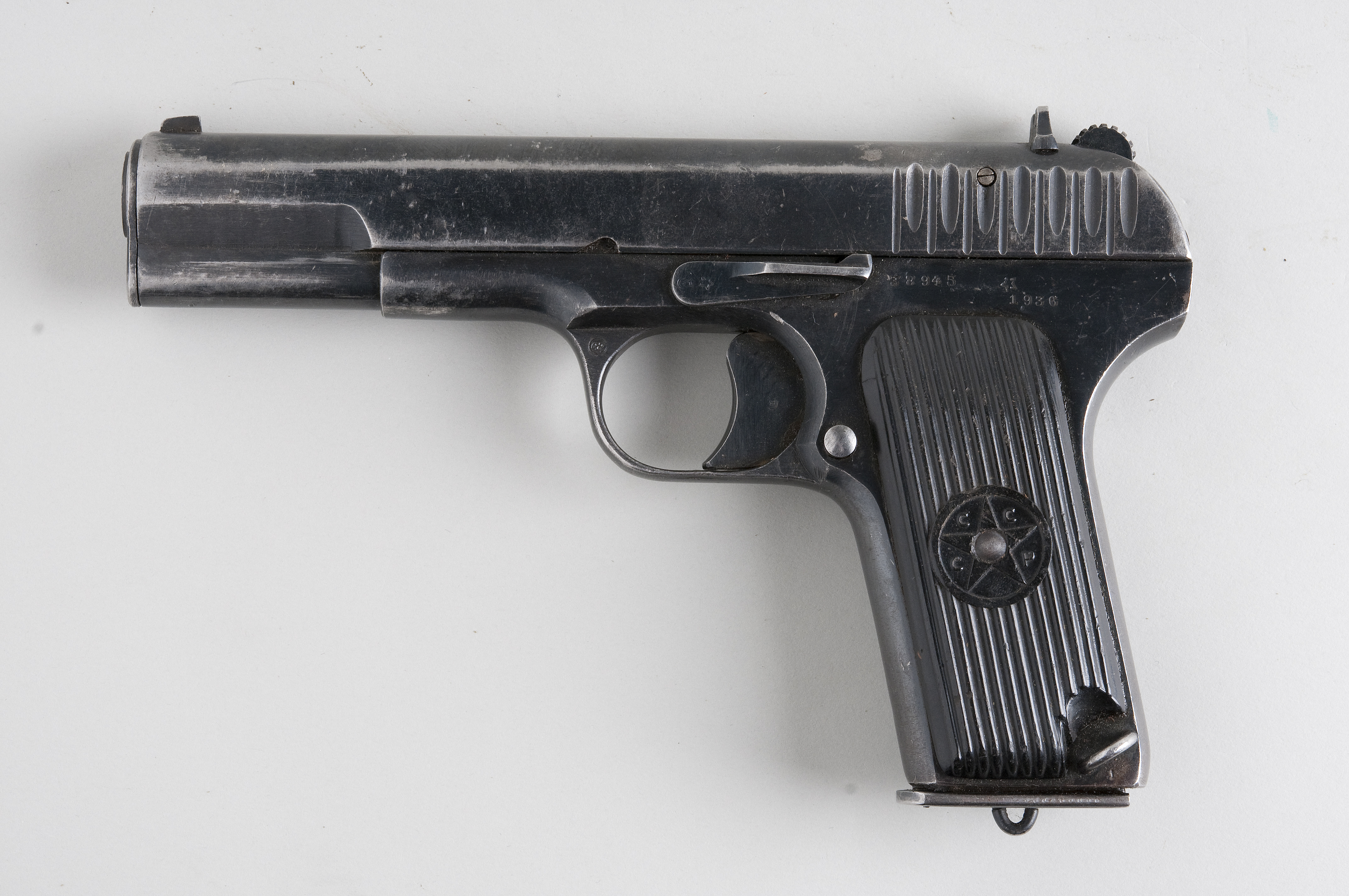
Tokarev TT-33 pistol

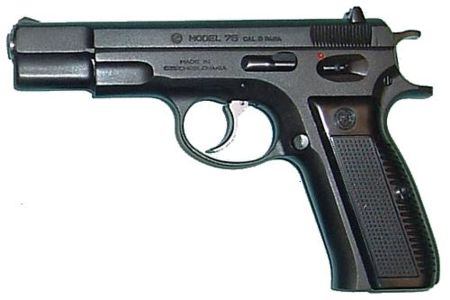
CZ 75 pistol

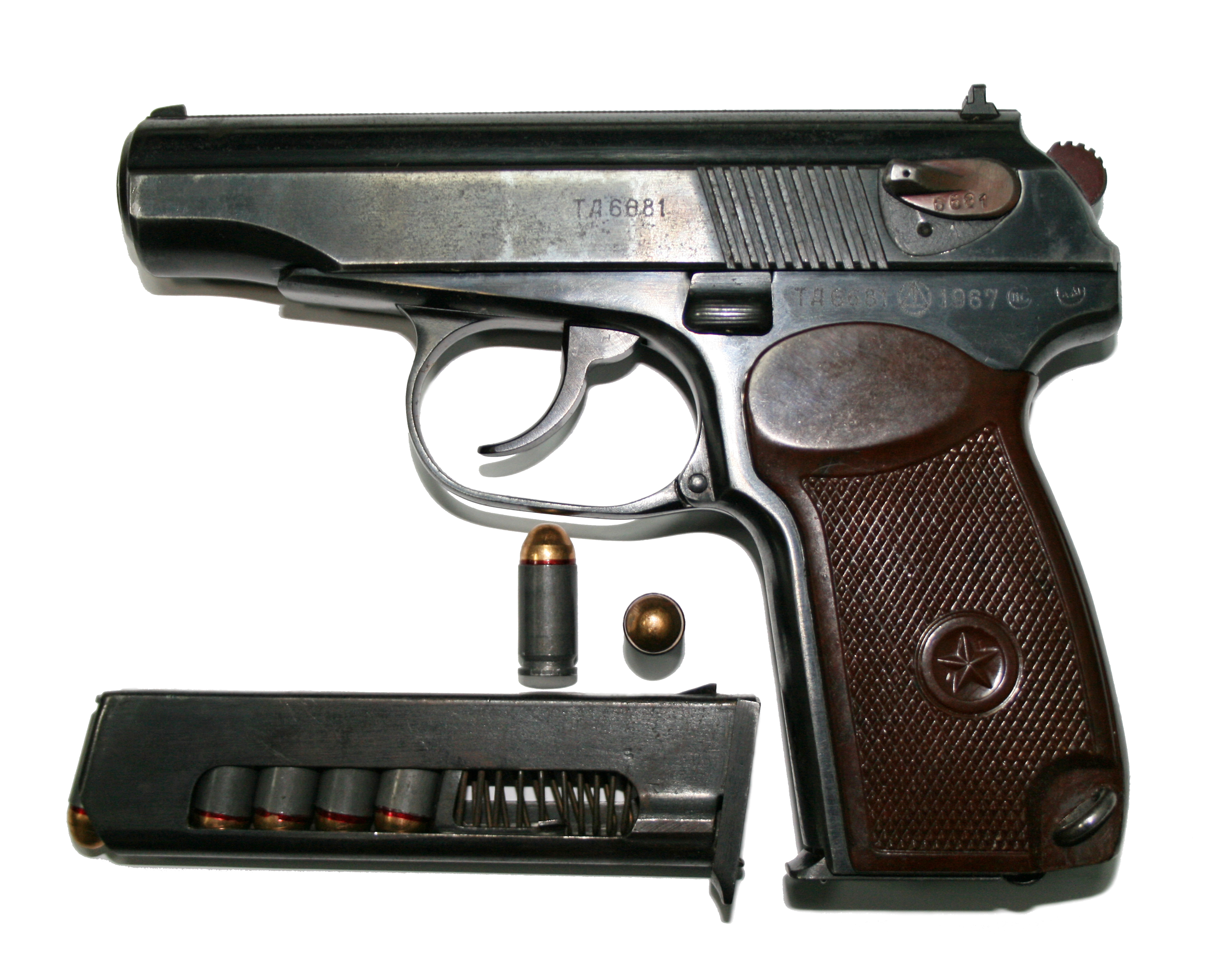
Makarov PM/PMM pistol

- Smith & Wesson Model 10 revolver
- Smith & Wesson Model 13 revolver
- Smith & Wesson Model 14 revolver
- Smith & Wesson Model 15 revolver
- Smith & Wesson Model 17 revolver
- Smith & Wesson Model 19 revolver
- Colt Single Action Army second generation revolver
- Colt Cobra .38 Special snub-nose revolver
- Mauser C96 "broomhandle" pistol
- Mauser HSc pistol
- Mauser M2 semi-automatic handgun
- Luger pistol
- Walther P38 pistol
- Walther PPK pistol
- Heckler & Koch VP70 pistol
- Heckler & Koch P7 pistol
- Heckler & Koch P9 pistol
- SIG P210 pistol
- SIG-Sauer P220 and P225 pistols
- Astra A-80 pistol
- Astra A-90 pistol
- Astra A-100 pistol
- Llama M82 pistol
- Star A, B, B Super, and P pistols
- Star 30M pistol
- Star Ultrastar, Firestar and Megastar pistols
- Taurus PT92, PT99, and PT100 pistols
- Beretta M1951 pistol
- Beretta 85, 86, 87 and 89 pistols
- MAB PA-15 pistol
- Colt M1911A1 Semi-Automatic Pistol
- Para-Ordnance P14-45 (Canadian-produced version of the M1911A1 pistol)
- FN Browning M1910 and M1922 pistols
- FN Browning Hi-Power pistol
- FN Browning BDM pistol
- FN Browning BDA380 pistol
- FN Browning HP-DA/BDA9 pistol
- Tokarev TT-33 pistol
- Makarov PM/PMM pistol
- CZ 52 pistol
- CZ 75 pistol
- CZ 82/83 pistol
- CZ 85 pistol

=== Submachine guns ===
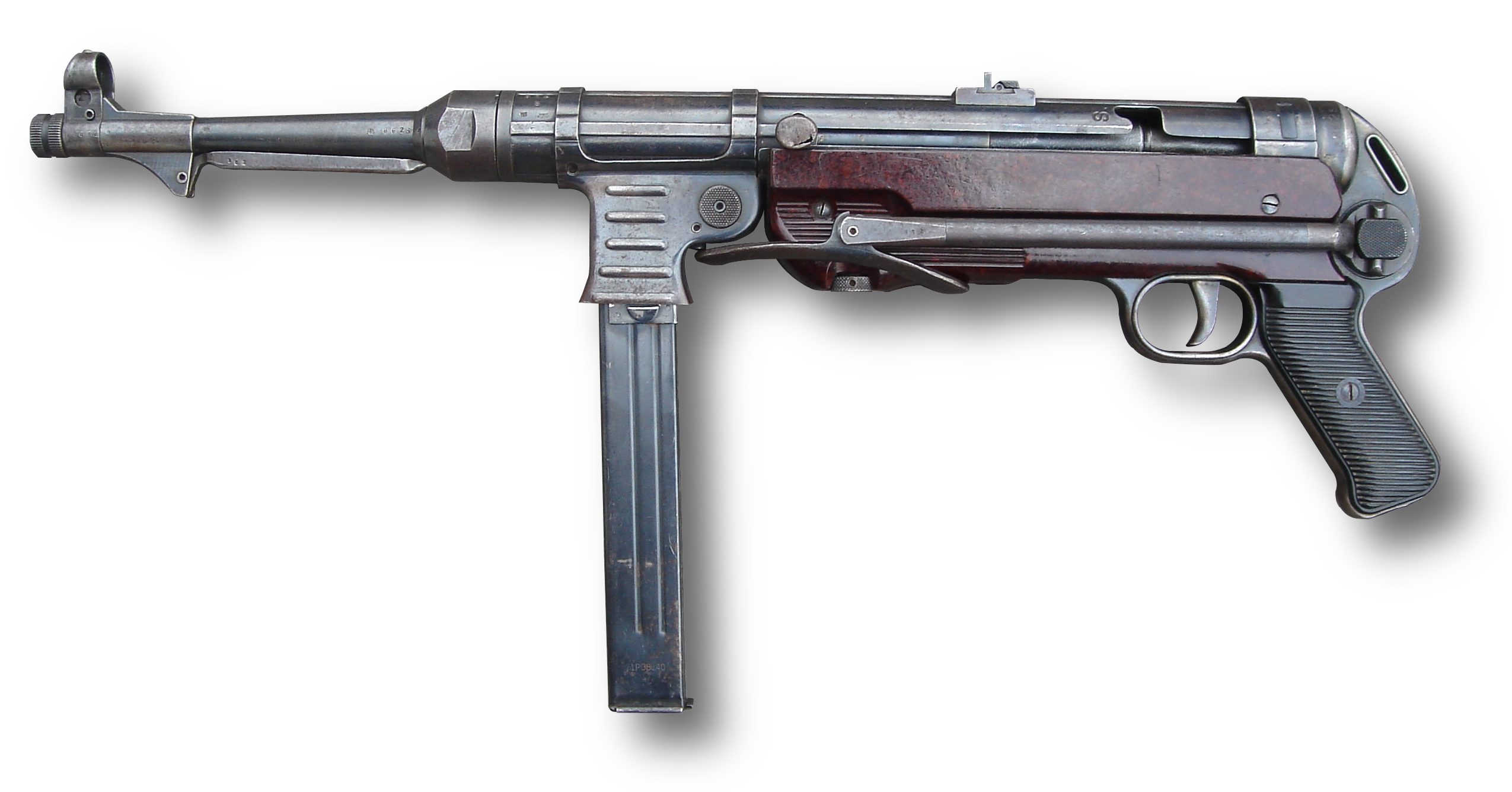
MP 40 Submachine gun

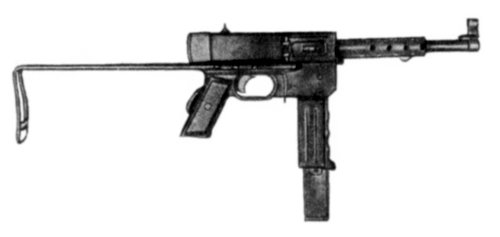
MAT-49 Submachine gun

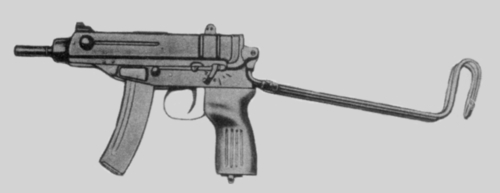
Škorpion vz. 61 Submachine gun

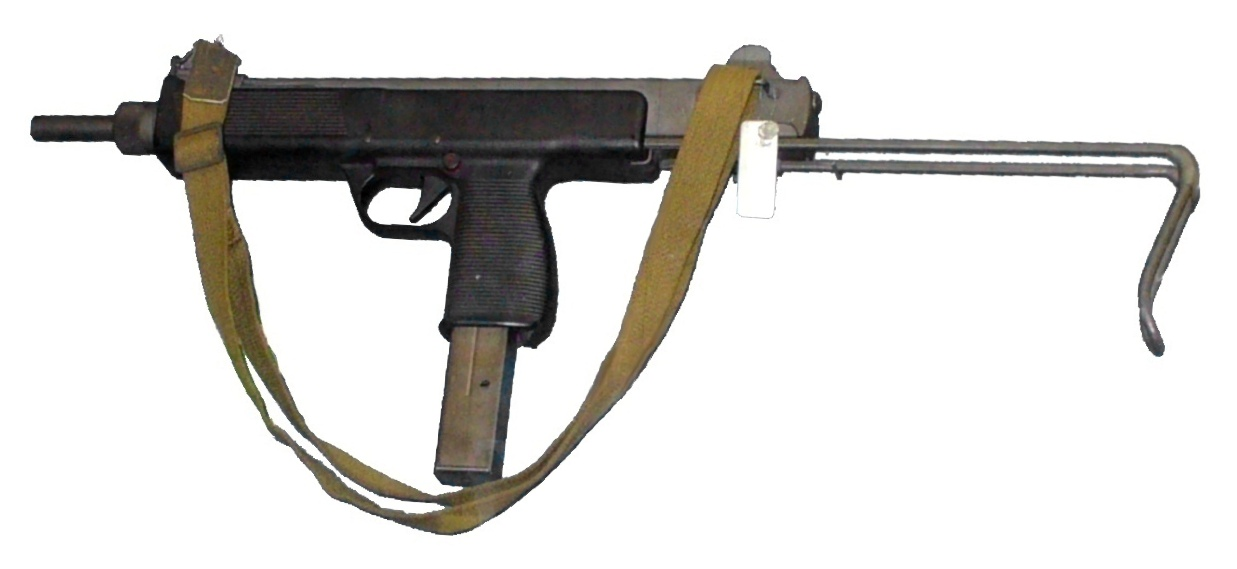
Steyr-MP-69 Submachine gun

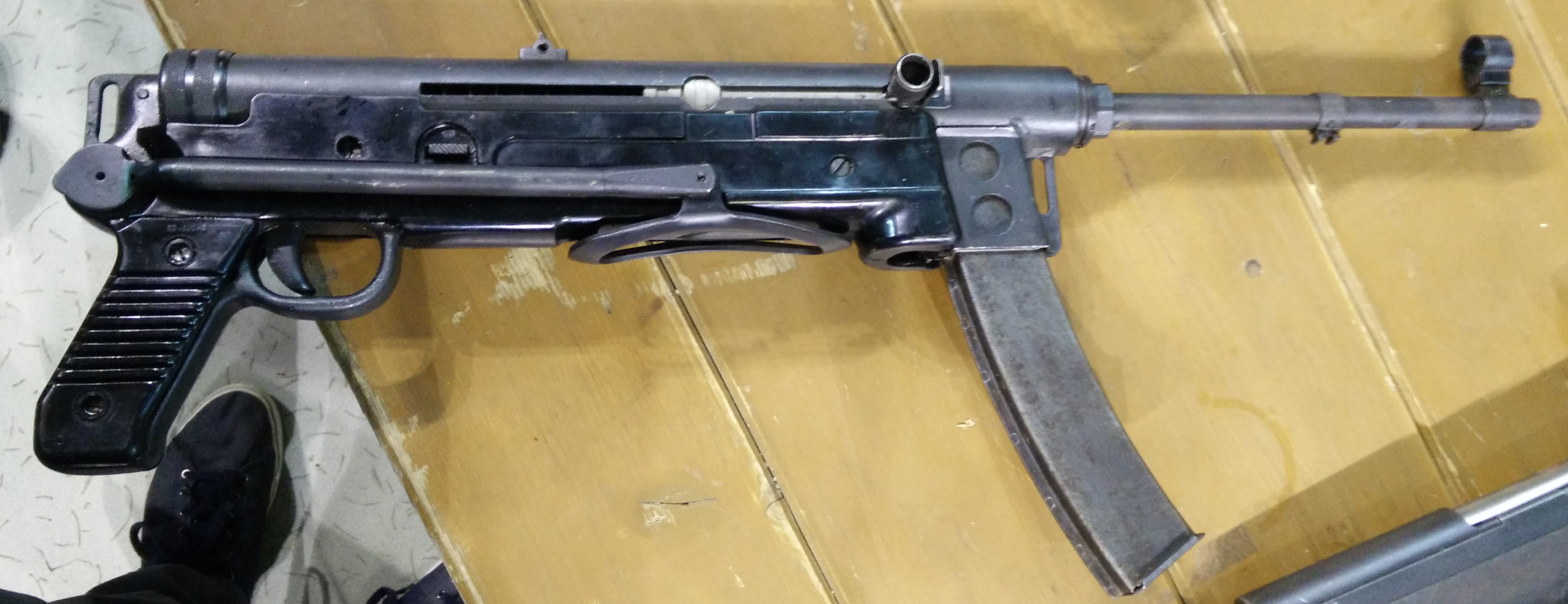
Crvena Zastava Automat M56 Submachine gun

- MP 40
- PPD-40
- PPSh-41
- Beretta M38/44 Found in a weapon cache.
- M1A1 Thompson
- Crvena Zastava Automat M56 (Yugoslavian-produced submachine gun similar in design to the German MP 40)
- MAT-49
- OTs-02 Kiparis
- Sa 25/26
- PM-63 RAK
- Sten Mk V
- Sterling L2A3/Mark 4 submachine gun
- L34A1/Mk.5 Sterling-Patchett (sound-suppressed version of the Sterling L2A3)
- Carl Gustaf m/45 (or its Egyptian-produced version, dubbed the "Port Said")
- Škorpion vz. 61
- Spectre M4
- Walther MPL
- Beretta Model 12
- Steyr MPi 69 (Austrian-produced submachine gun similar in design to the Israeli Uzi)
- Uzi (MP-2, Mini Uzi, and Micro Uzi variants)
- MAC-10 Machine pistol
- MAC-11 Machine pistol (sub-compact version of the MAC-10)
- Heckler & Koch MP5
- Heckler & Koch MP5K (shortened version of the MP5)

=== Bolt-action rifles ===
- Lee–Enfield SMLE Mk III
- Pattern 1914 Enfield
- Lebel Model 1886 rifle
- Berthier 1907/15 - M16 Lebel rifle
- Berthier 1892 M16 cavalry carbine
- MAS-36 rifle
- Mauser Model 1888 commission rifle
- Mauser Gewehr 98
- Mauser Karabiner 98k
- Mannlicher M1895 infantry rifle
- Mosin–Nagant

=== Semi-automatic rifles ===
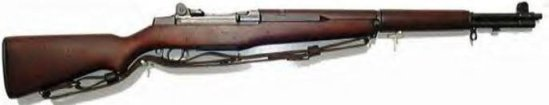
M1 Garand rifle (Beretta Model 1952)

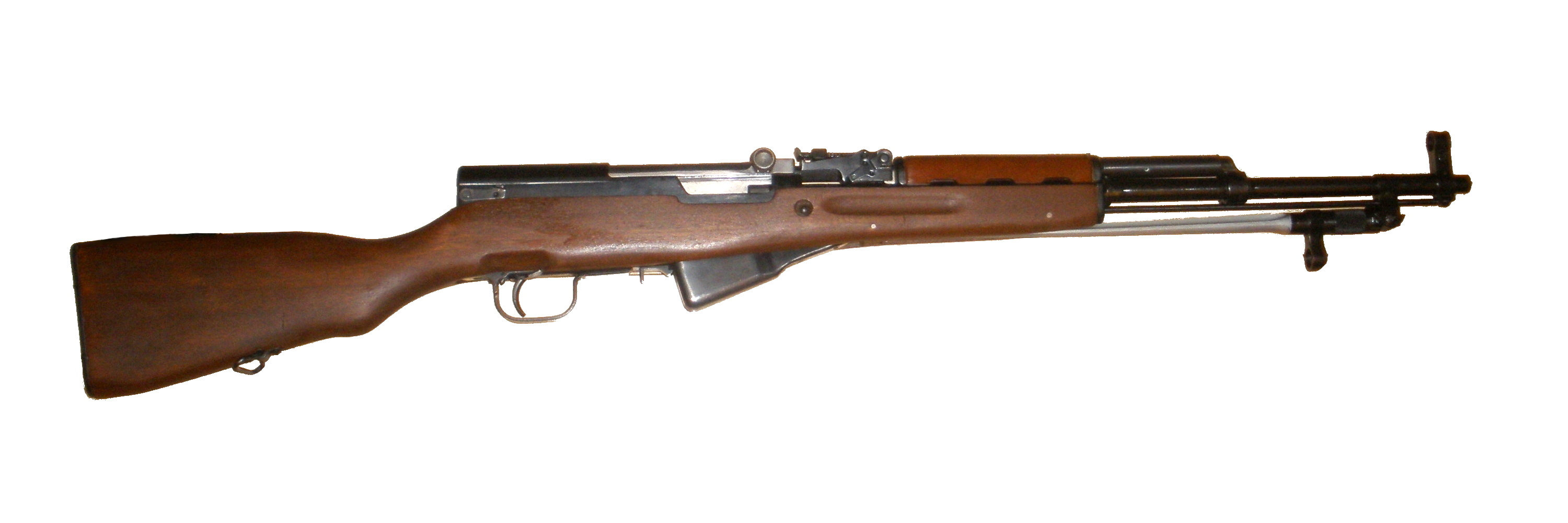
SKS semi-automatic rifle

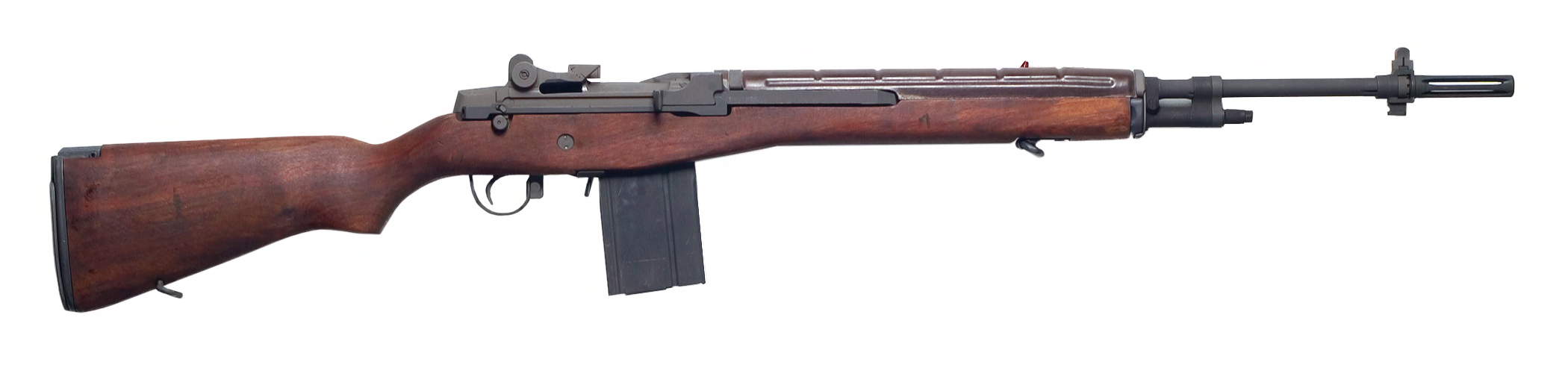
M14 semi-automatic rifle

- MAS-49 rifle
- M1 Garand (or its Italian-produced copy, the Beretta Model 1952)
- SKS
- Vz. 52 rifle
- M14 rifle
- Beretta BM 59 (Italian-produced semi-automatic rifle similar in design to the M14)

=== Carbines ===
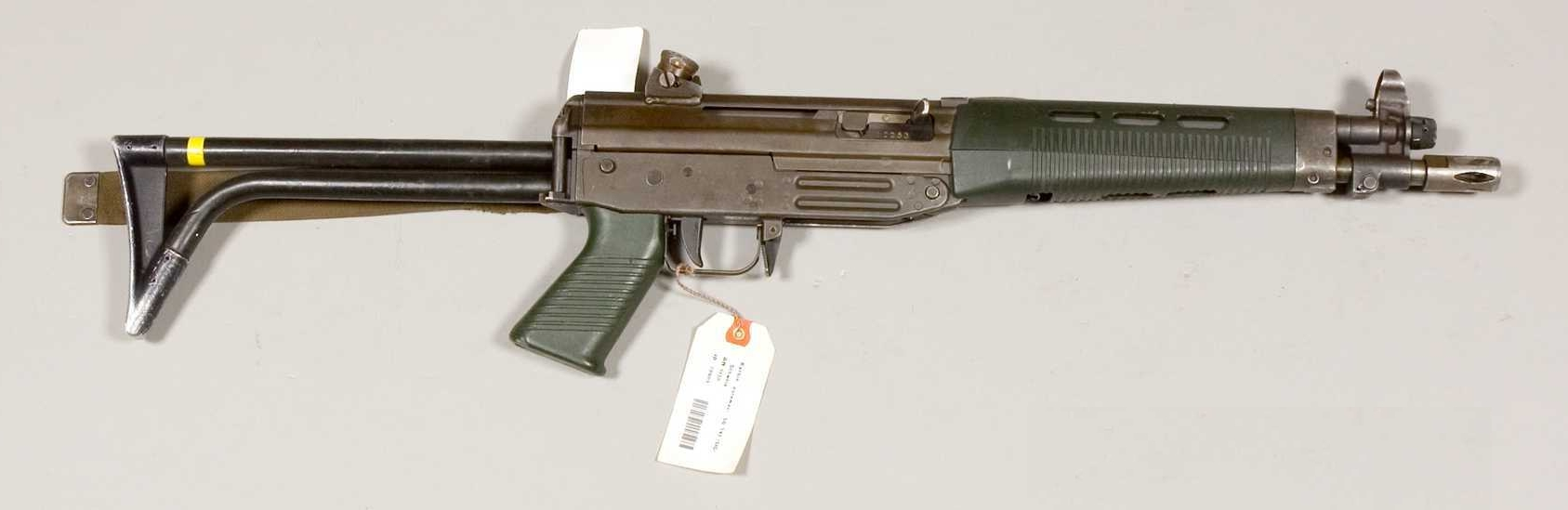
SIG SG 543 carbine

- MAS-49/56 carbine
- M2 carbine
- CAR-15 carbine
- SIG SG 543 carbine

=== Assault rifles and Battle Rifles ===
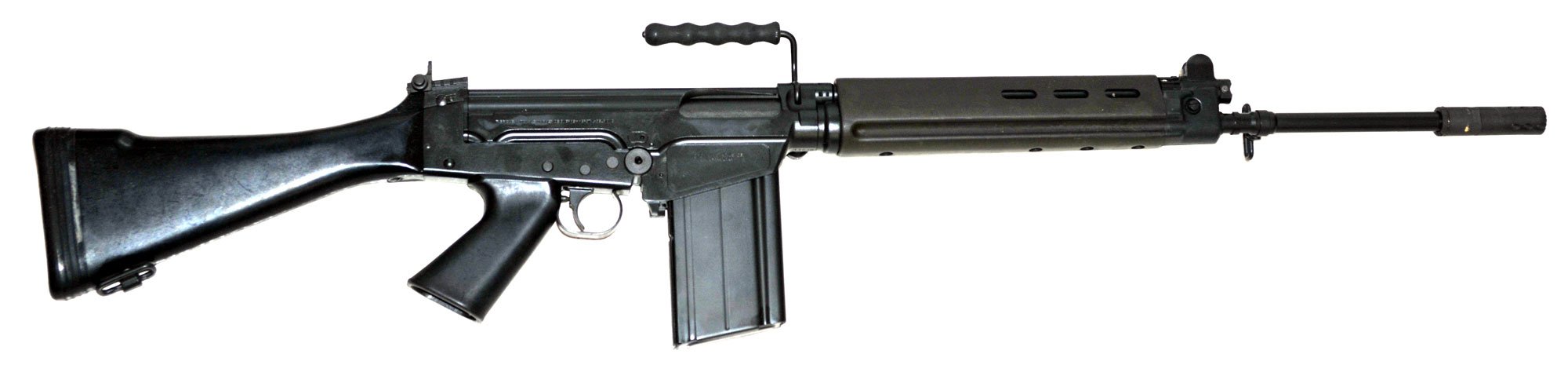
FN FAL assault rifle

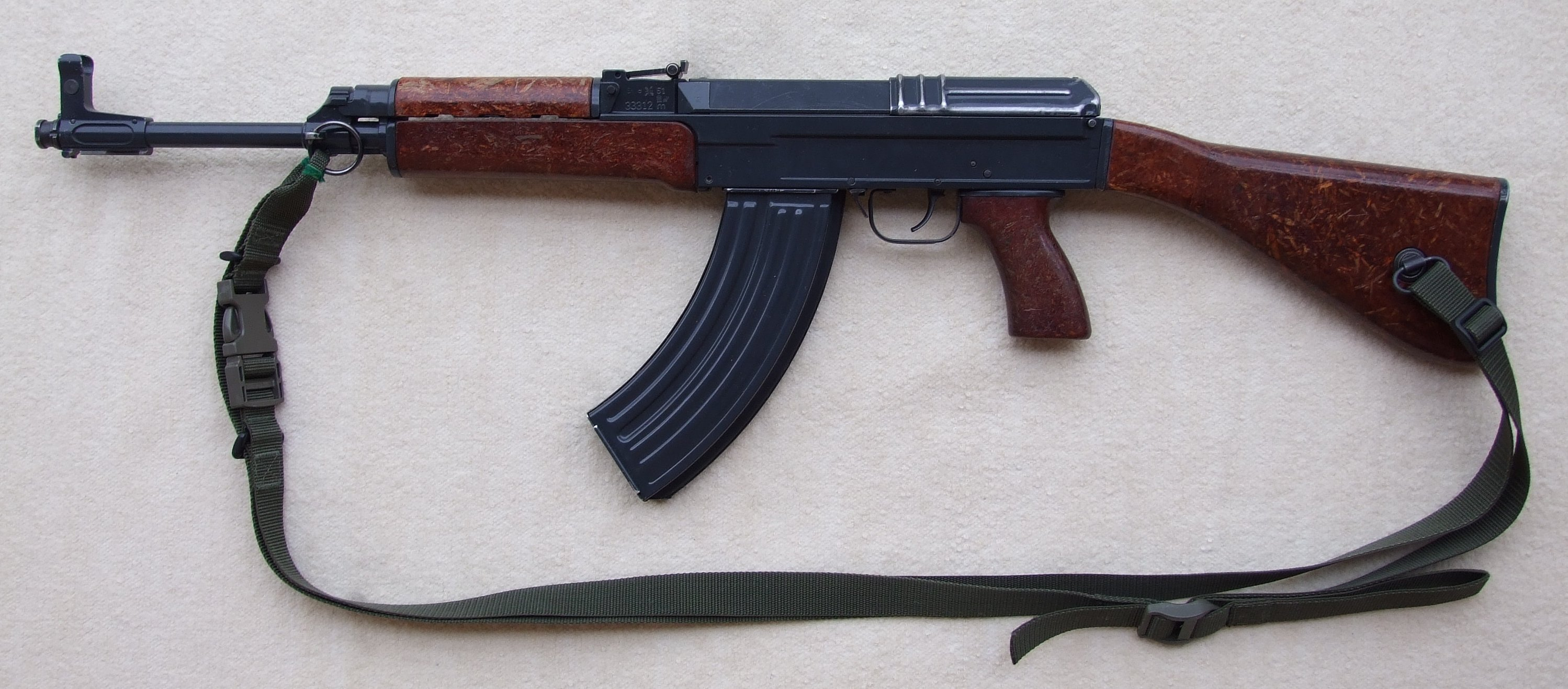
vz. 58 assault rifle

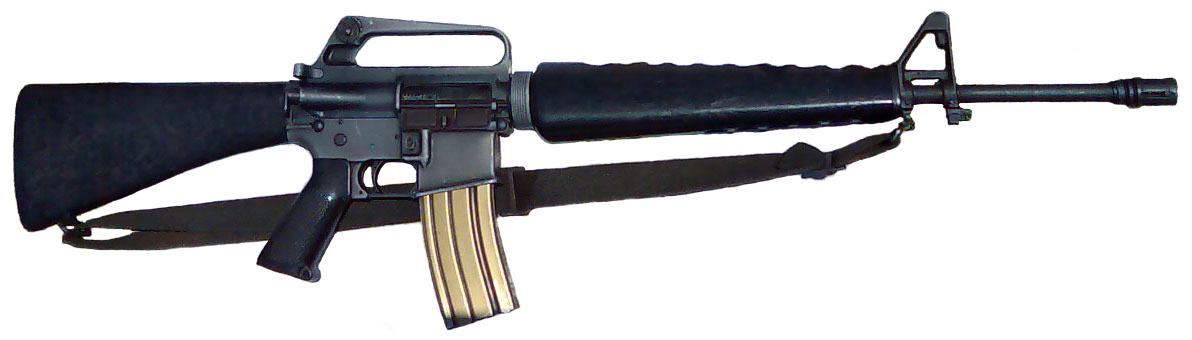
M16A1 assault rifle

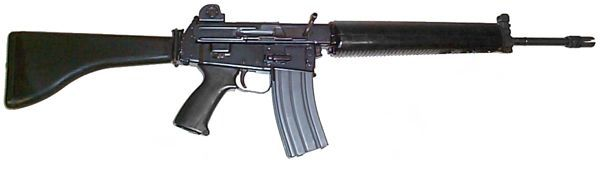
AR-18 assault rifle

- Sturmgewehr 44 assault rifle
- AK-47 assault rifle (other variants included the AKM, the Hungarian AK-63, the Yugoslav Zastava M70 and Zastava M80, the Polish PMK-DGN-60, Chinese Type 56 and Type 56-1, North Korean Type 58 and Type 68, the Romanian Pistol Mitralieră model 1963/1965 and AIM, Bulgarian AKK/AKKS, and former East German MPi-KM and MPi-KMS-72 assault rifles)
- AK-74
- Vz. 58
- AMD-65
- FN FAL
- FN CAL
- ROMAT (Israeli-produced 'lightened' version of the FN FAL battle rifle)
- M16A1
- M16A2
- ArmaLite AR-18
- Norinco CQ
- CETME Model C (Spanish-produced assault rifle similar in design to the German Heckler & Koch G3)
- Heckler & Koch G3
- Heckler & Koch HK33
- Heckler & Koch G41
- Heckler & Koch G53
- SIG SG 540 and SIG SG 542 assault rifles

=== Sniper rifles and Designated marksman rifles ===
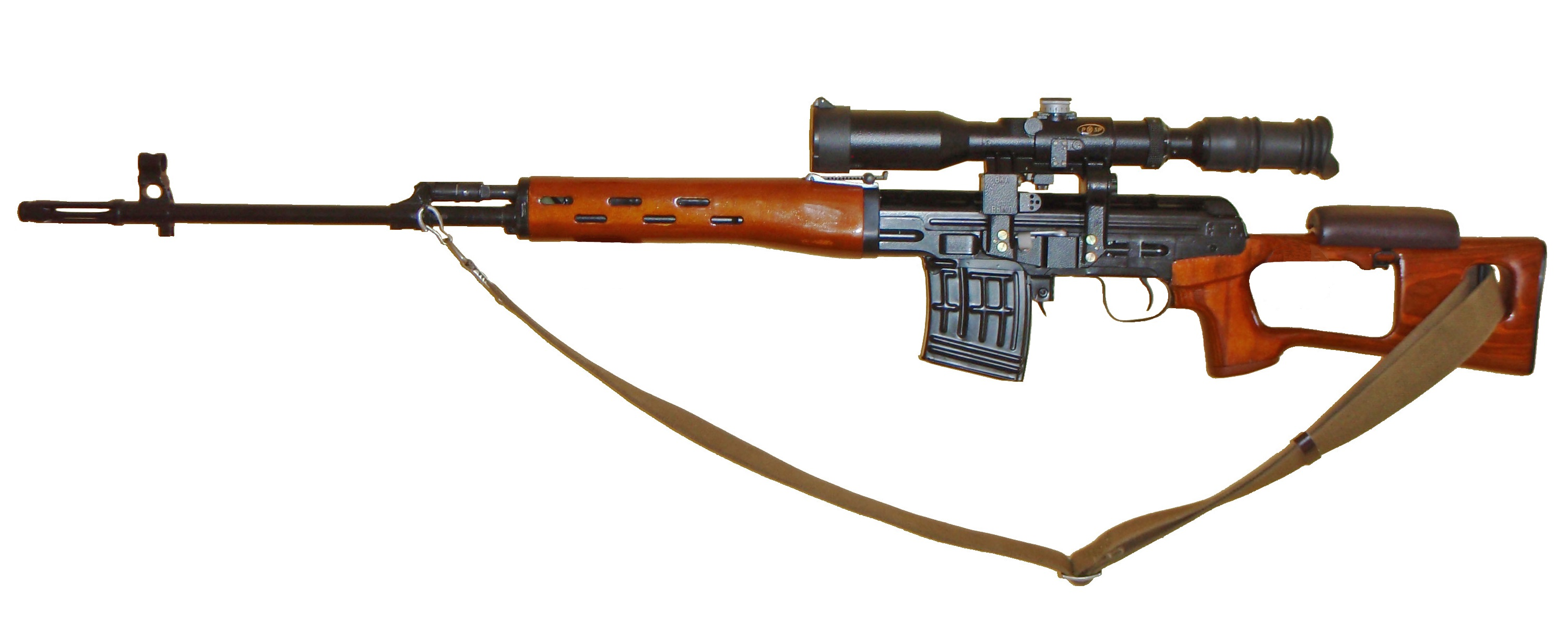
Dragunov SVD-63 sniper rifle

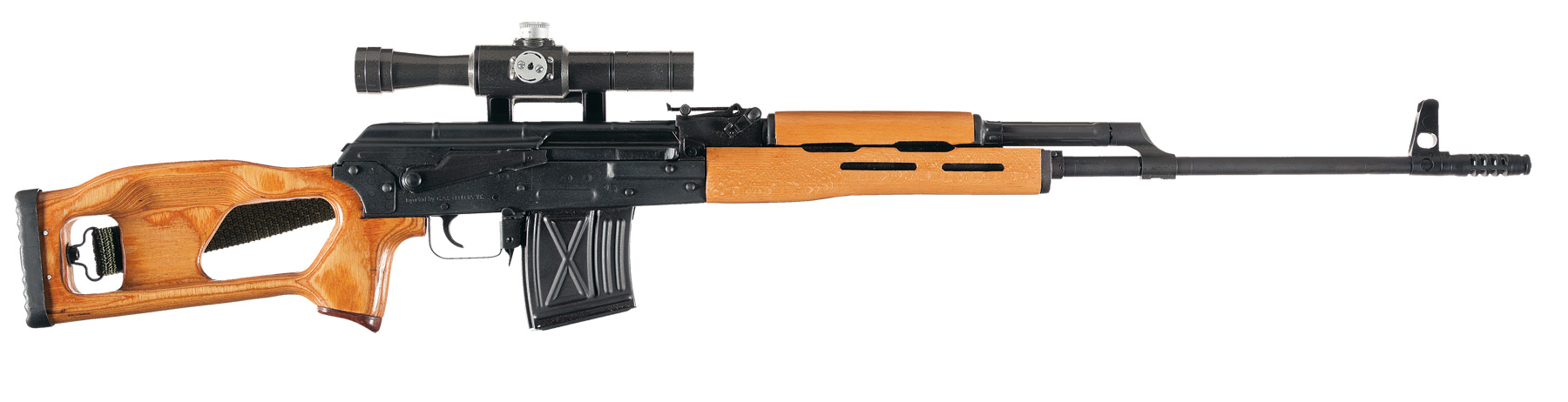
PSL sniper rifle

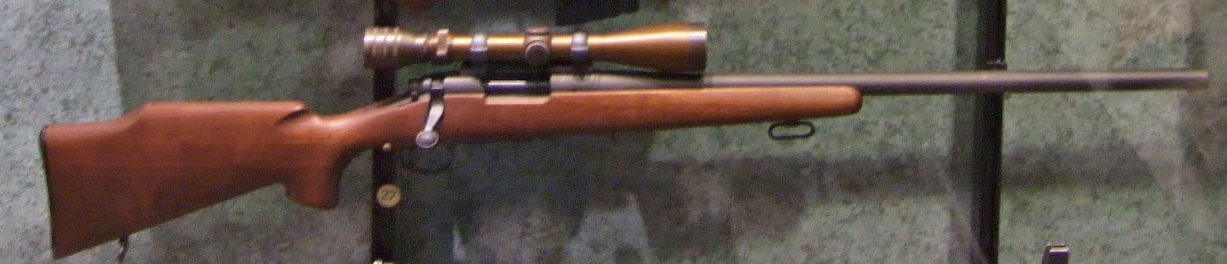
M40 sniper rifle

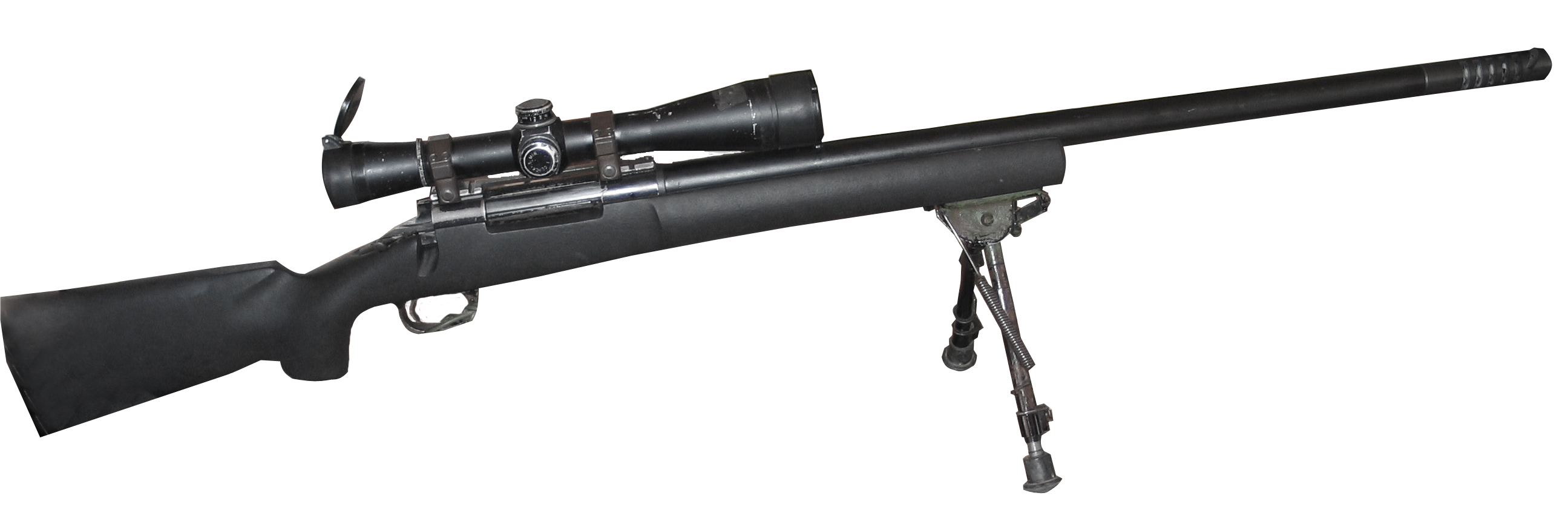
Remington Model 700 sniper rifle

- Lee–Enfield SMLE Mk III (equipped with telescopic sights)
- FN FAL (equipped with telescopic sights)
- Heckler & Koch G3 (equipped with telescopic sights)
- M16A1 (equipped with telescopic sights; not very effective)
- SIG SG 542 (equipped with telescopic sights)
- FR F1
- Dragunov SVD-63
- Tabuk Sniper Rifle
- Zastava M76/M78
- M21 Sniper Weapon System
- M40 rifle
- Remington Model 700
- Savage 10FP/110FP
- PSL Sniper Rifle
- SSG 82
- Steyr SSG 69
- Enfield L42A1 (military version) and Enforcer (Police version) rifles
- Heckler & Koch PSG1
- PTRS-41 14.5mm anti-tank rifle (used for heavy sniping)

=== Shotguns ===
- Winchester Model 1200
- Mossberg 500 12-gauge (20.2 mm)
- Remington Model 870 Police Magnum 12-gauge (20.2 mm)
- Franchi SPAS-12 semi-automatic
- Franchi SPAS-15 semi-automatic

=== Light machine guns ===
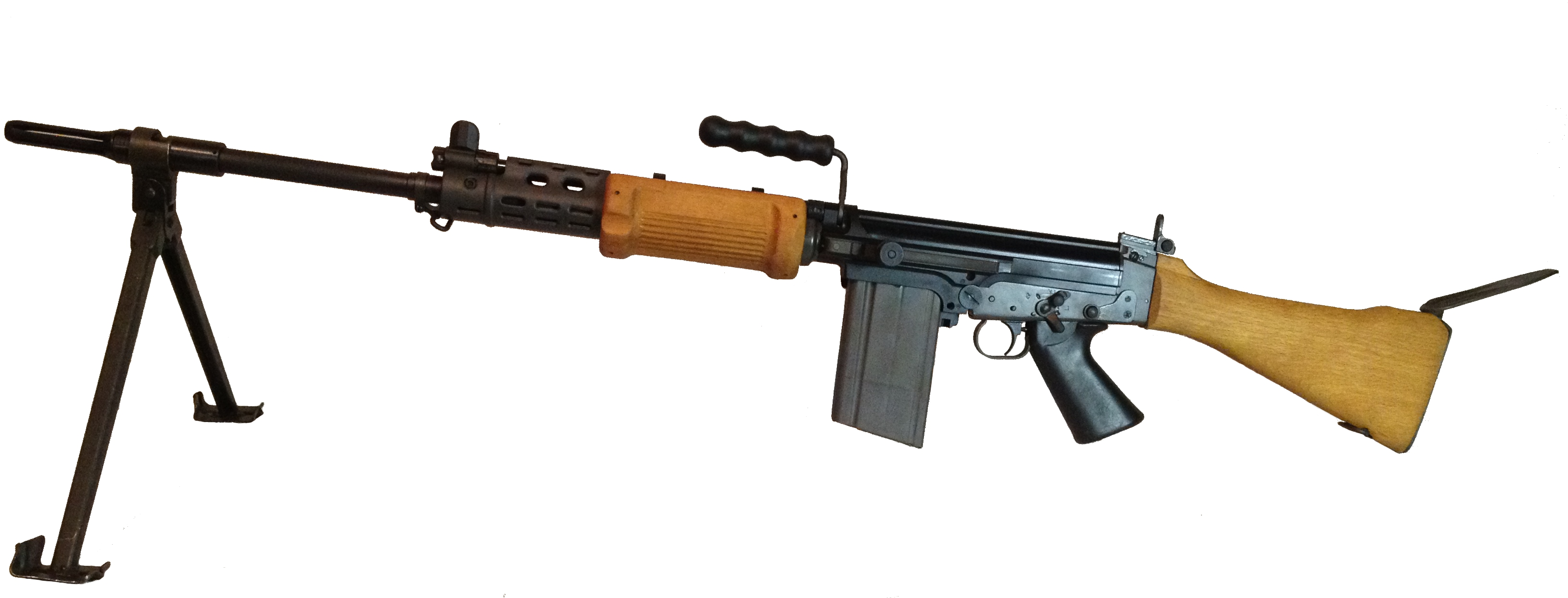
Israeli Heavy Barrel MAKLEON FAL.

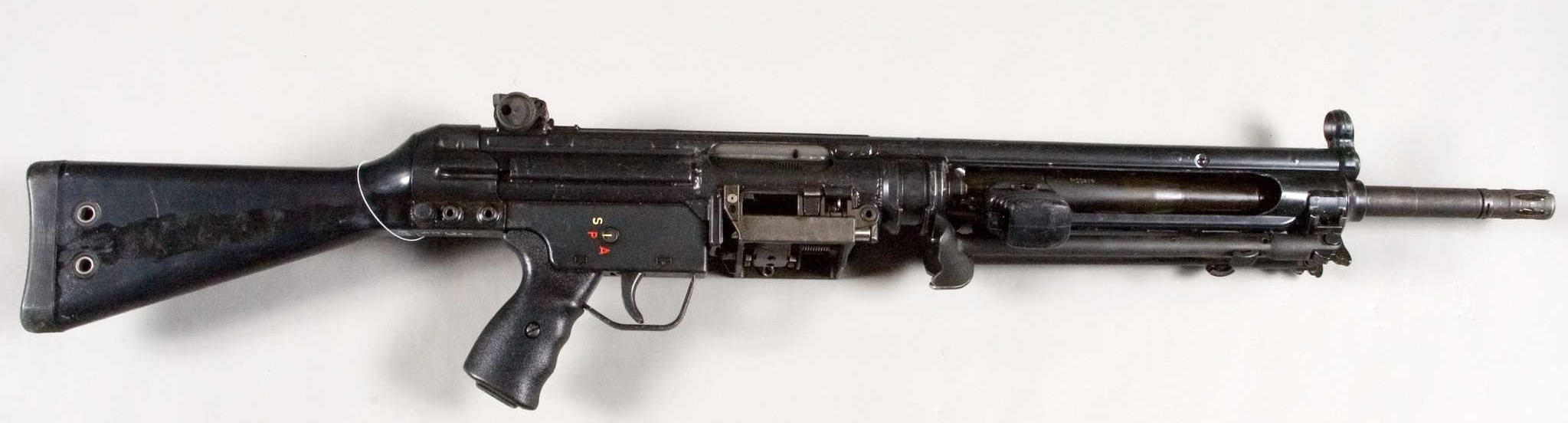
HK 21 light machine gun

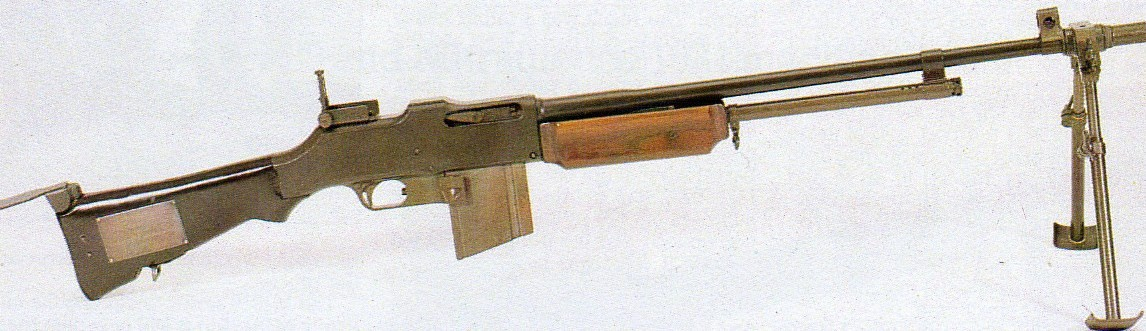
M1918A2 BAR

- M1918A2 BAR
- Bren Mk. I .303 (7.7mm)
- RPK
- Zastava M77 (Yugoslav-produced version of the RPK)
- RPD
- DP-28
- FM 24/29
- Heckler & Koch HK21
- FN FAL 50-41 Heavy Barrel (HB)
- MAKLEON (Israeli-produced version of the FN FAL 50-41 HB)

=== General-purpose machine guns ===
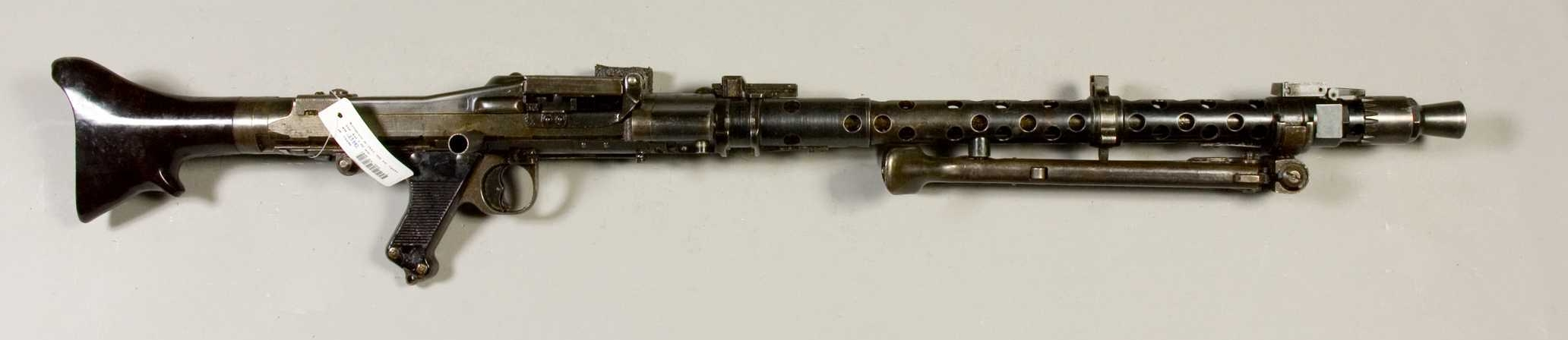
MG 34 machine gun

- MG 34
- MG 42
- Rheinmetall MG 3
- PK/PKM
- Type 80 (Chinese-produced version of the PK/PKM)
- Zastava M84 (Yugoslav-produced version of the PK/PKM)
- UK vz. 59
- Type 67
- AA-52 (mainly mounted on AML armoured cars and VAB APCs)
- FN MAG
- M60

=== Medium and Heavy machine guns ===
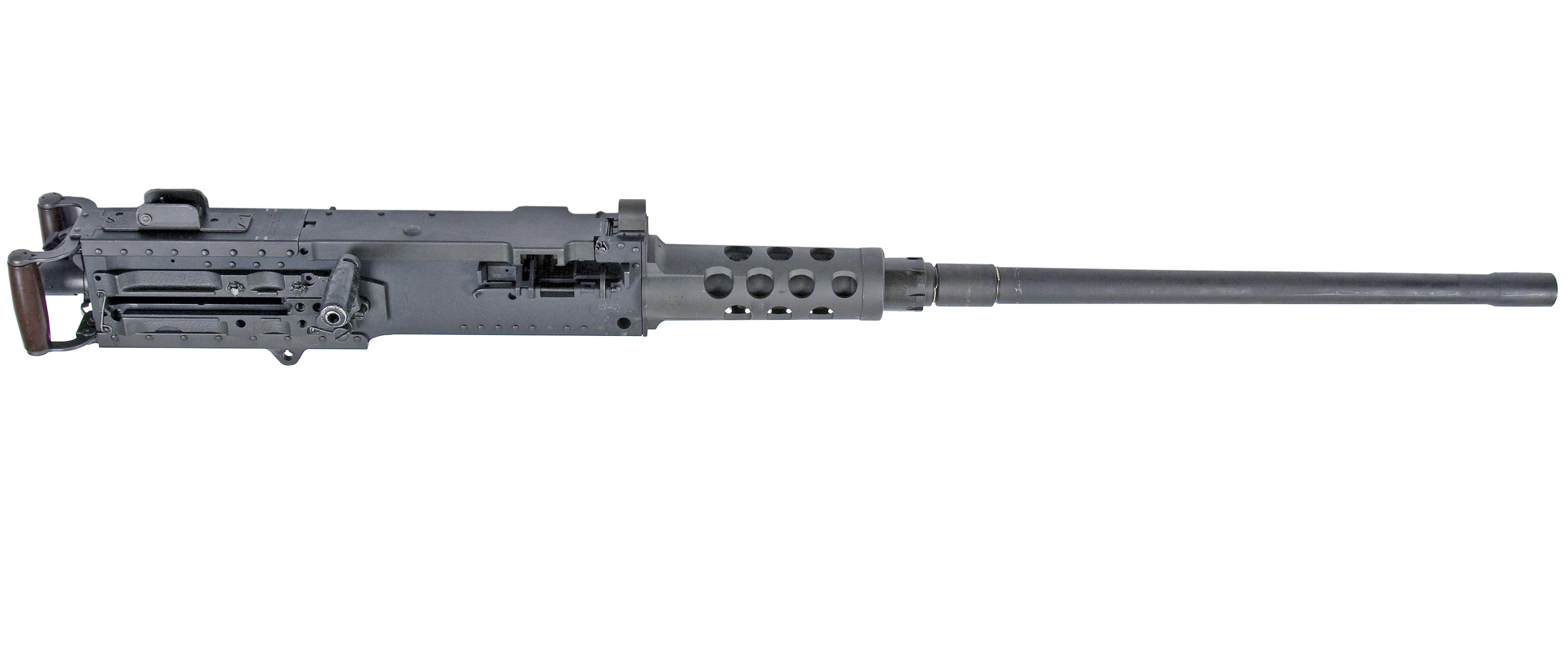
M2HB heavy machine gun

- Breda M37 7.92mm
- Besa Mark III 7.92mm (mounted on Technicals)
- Browning M1919A4 .30 Cal (mounted on Technicals, armoured cars, tanks, and APCs)
- SG-43/SGM Goryunov (mounted on Technicals, tanks and APCs)
- Type 53/57 (Chinese variant of the SG-43 and SGM)
- DShKM 12.7mm Heavy machine gun (mainly mounted on Technicals, tanks and APCs)
- Vz. 38/46 (Czechoslovak variant of the DShKM)
- Type 54 (Chinese variant of the DShKM)
- Type 77 12.7mm Heavy machine gun
- NSV 12.7mm Heavy machine gun (taken off from disabled tanks and re-mounted on Technicals)
- Zastava M87 (Yugoslav variant of the NSV mounted on Technicals)
- KPV 14.5mm Heavy machine gun (mounted on Technicals)
- Browning M2HB .50 Cal (mounted on Technicals, tanks, and APCs)
- AN/M2 aircraft gun (version of the Browning M2HB mounted on Technicals and armoured cars)

=== Grenade systems ===
- Mark 2 "Pineapple" Fragmentation Hand/Rifle Grenade
- M61 Fragmentation Hand Grenade
- M67 grenade
- M18 smoke grenade
- M5 grenade
- M26 grenade
- Type 67 stick grenade
- F1 hand grenade
- RG-4 anti-personnel grenade
- RG-42 hand grenade
- RGD-5 hand grenade
- RPG-43 anti-tank grenade
- RKG-3 anti-tank grenade
- PGN-60 anti-tank rifle grenade
- M60 rifle grenade
- AC58 rifle grenade
- APAV40 rifle grenade
- M52 rifle grenade
- STRIM 65 rifle grenade
- Mecar R1A1 Super Energa rifle grenade
- Mecar BTU rifle grenade
- FN Telgren rifle grenade

=== Land mine systems ===
- M18A1 Claymore anti-personnel mine
- M14 anti-personnel mine
- No. 3 anti-personnel mine
- No. 4/4A anti-personnel mine
- No. 4 enhanced anti-personnel mine
- No. 10 anti-personnel mine
- PMD-6/6M anti-personnel mine
- PMN 2 anti-personnel mine
- Type 72A/B anti-personnel mine
- GYATA 64 anti-personnel mine
- Mi Ap ID Mle 51 anti-personnel mine
- Mi Ap DV Mle 59 anti-personnel mine
- MAPS anti-personnel mine
- VS 50 anti-personnel mine
- PRB M35 anti-personnel mine
- TM-46/TMN-46 anti-tank mine
- TM-57 anti-tank mine
- TM-62M anti-tank mine
- TMA-3 anti-tank mine
- TMA-4 anti-tank mine
- TMA-5 anti-tank mine
- M6A1 anti-tank mine
- M7A1 anti-tank mine
- M15 anti-tank mine
- M19 anti-tank mine
- PRB M3 anti-tank mine
- Mk 7 anti-tank mine
- TC/6 anti-tank mine

=== Anti-tank rocket and grenade launchers ===
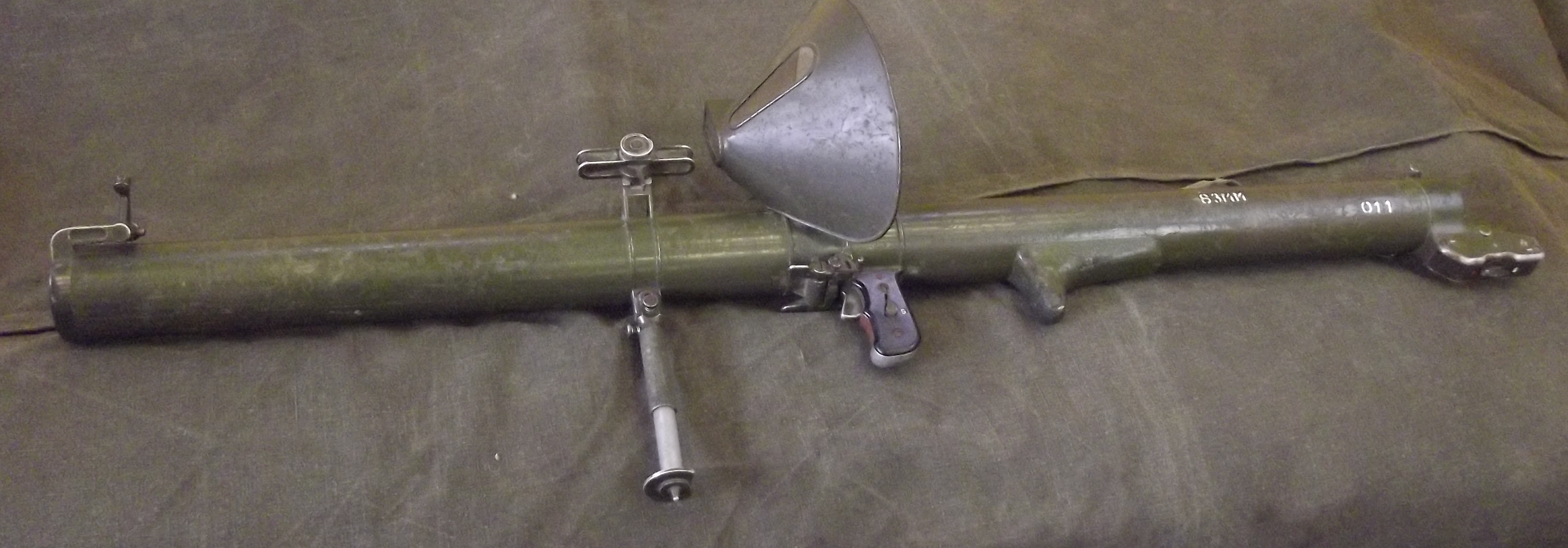
RL-83 Blindicide

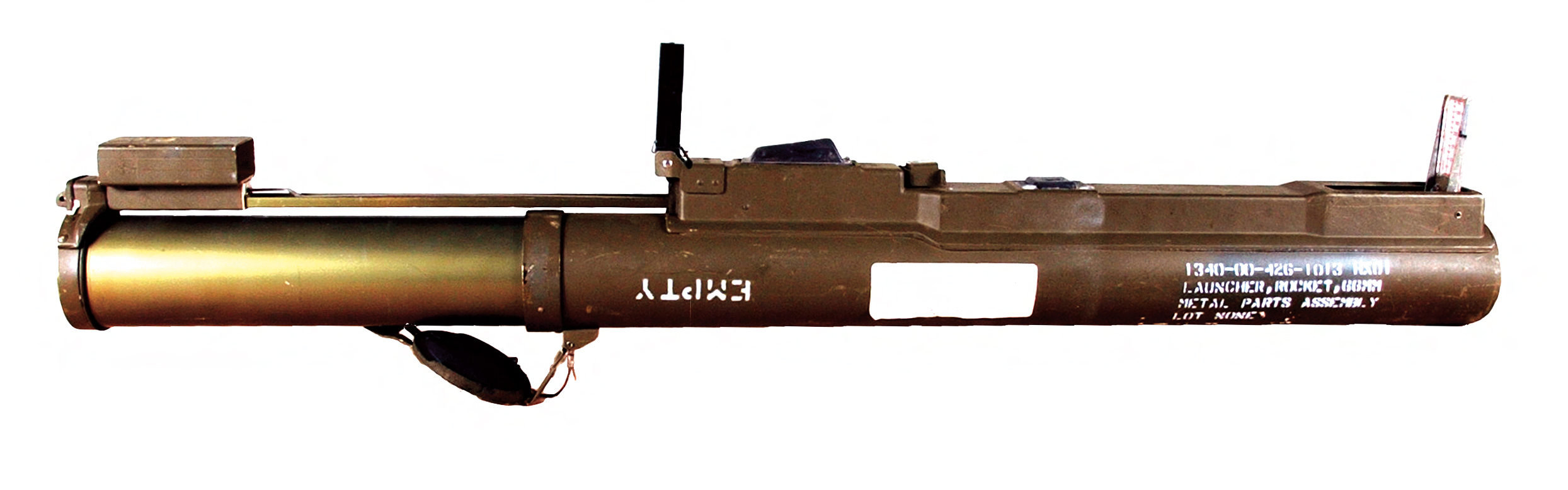
M72 LAW

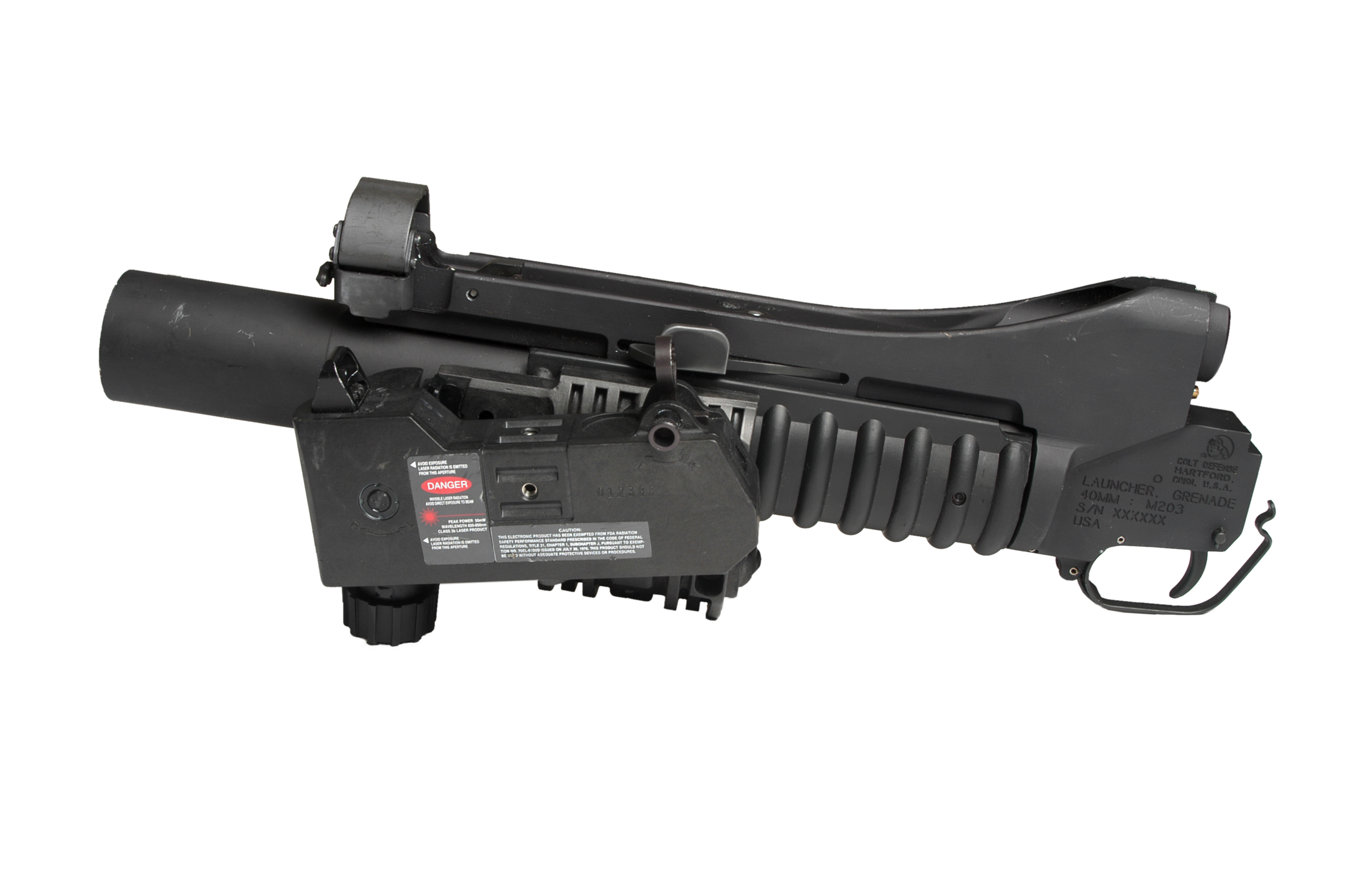
M203 grenade launcher

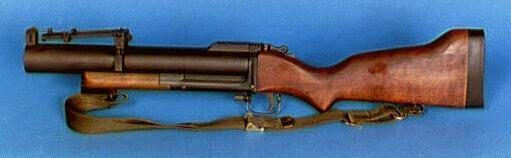
M79 grenade launcher

- M9A1 Bazooka 60 mm
- 88.9mm Instalaza M65 (Spanish improved variant of the US M20 "Super Bazooka" 3.5 inch)
- LRAC Mle 50 73 mm (French-produced anti-tank rocket launcher developed from the German Panzerschreck)
- RL-83 Blindicide anti-tank rocket launcher
- M72 LAW
- M80 Zolja 64 mm (Yugoslav-produced anti-tank rocket launcher similar to the M72 LAW)
- RPG-2 rocket-propelled grenade launcher.
- RPG-7 rocket-propelled grenade launcher.
- Type 69 RPG rocket-propelled grenade launcher
- M47 Dragon
- CMS B-300 83 mm reusable man-portable anti-tank weapon system
- ENTAC
- MILAN (mounted on Technicals and M113 APCs)
- BGM-71 TOW (mounted on Technicals and M113 APCs)
- AT-3 Sagger
- M203 grenade launcher
- M79 grenade launcher

=== Recoilless rifles ===
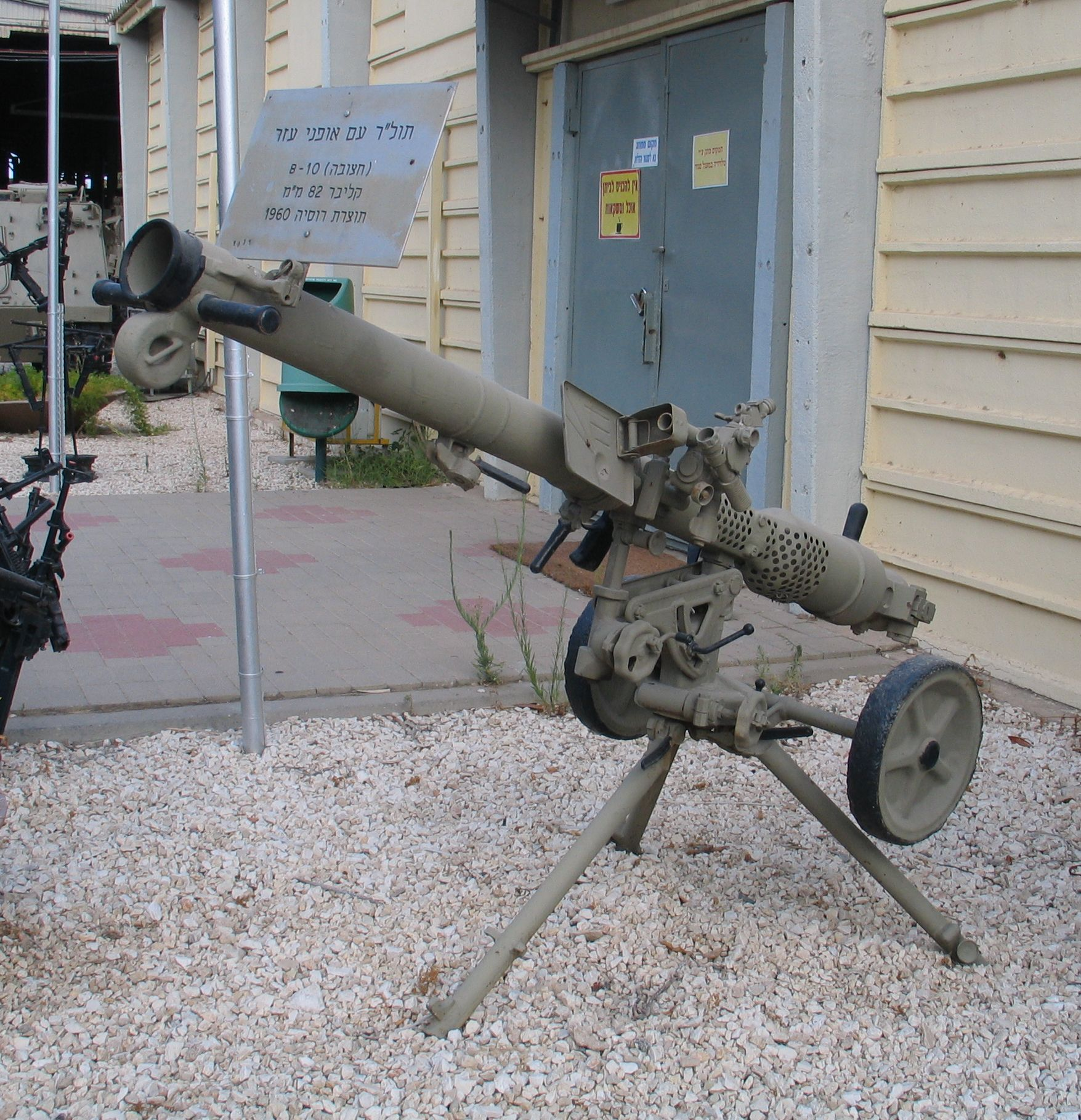
B-10 82 mm recoilless rifle in Batey Ha-Osef Museum, Tel Aviv, Israel.

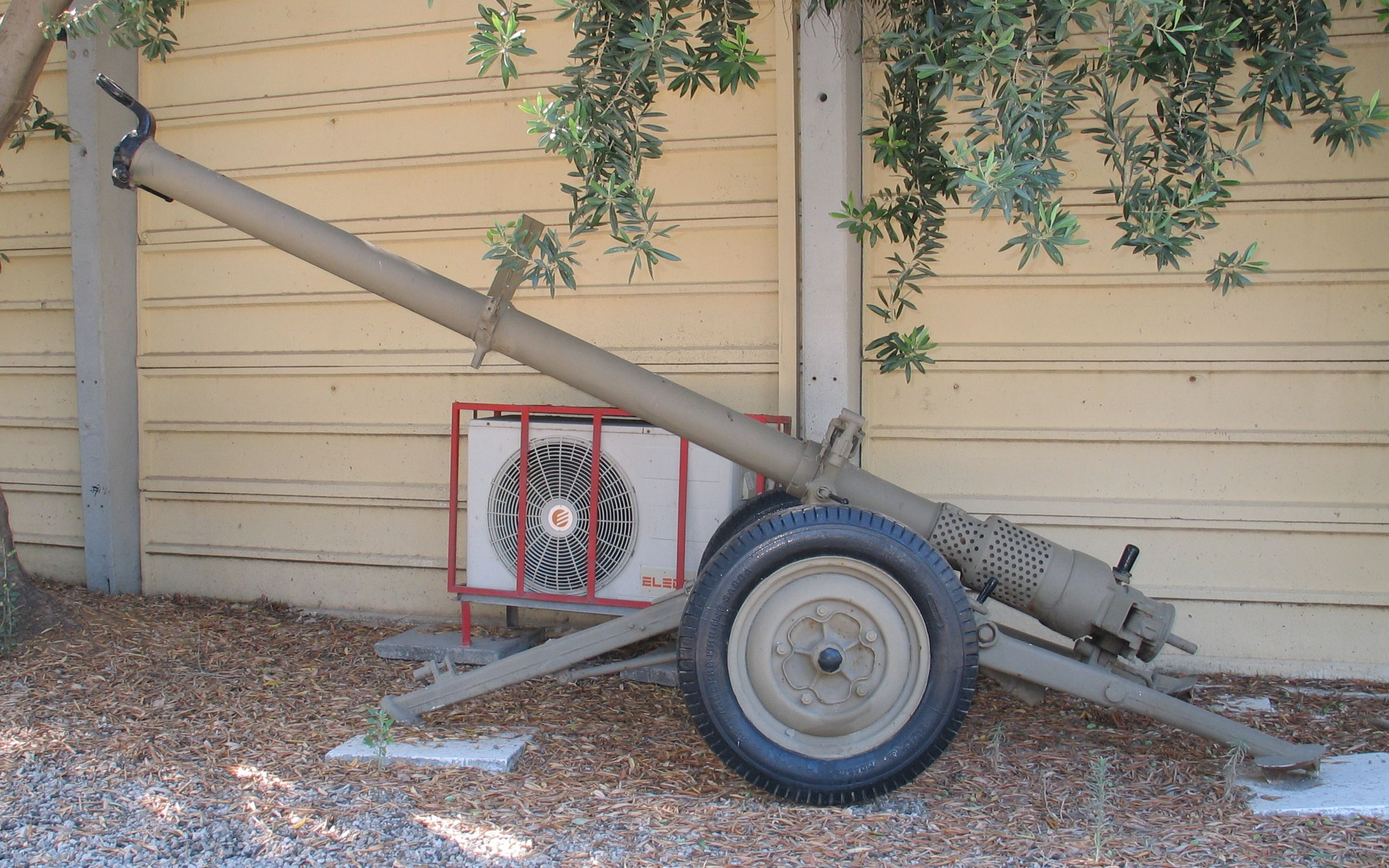
B-11 107 mm recoilless rifle in Batey ha-Osef Museum, Tel Aviv, Israel.

- Type 36 57 mm (Chinese-produced version of the shoulder-fired US M18 recoilless rifle)
- M2 Carl Gustaf 84 mm (shoulder-fired)
- M67 90 mm (shoulder-fired)
- B-10 82 mm (mounted on Technicals)
- B-11 107 mm (mounted on Technicals)
- SPG-9 73 mm (mounted on Technicals)
- Type 56 75 mm (Chinese variant of the US M20 recoilless rifle)
- M40A1 106 mm (mounted on Technicals, M113, AMX-VCI, and VAB APCs)
- L6 Wombat 120 mm (mounted on Technicals)

=== Mortars ===
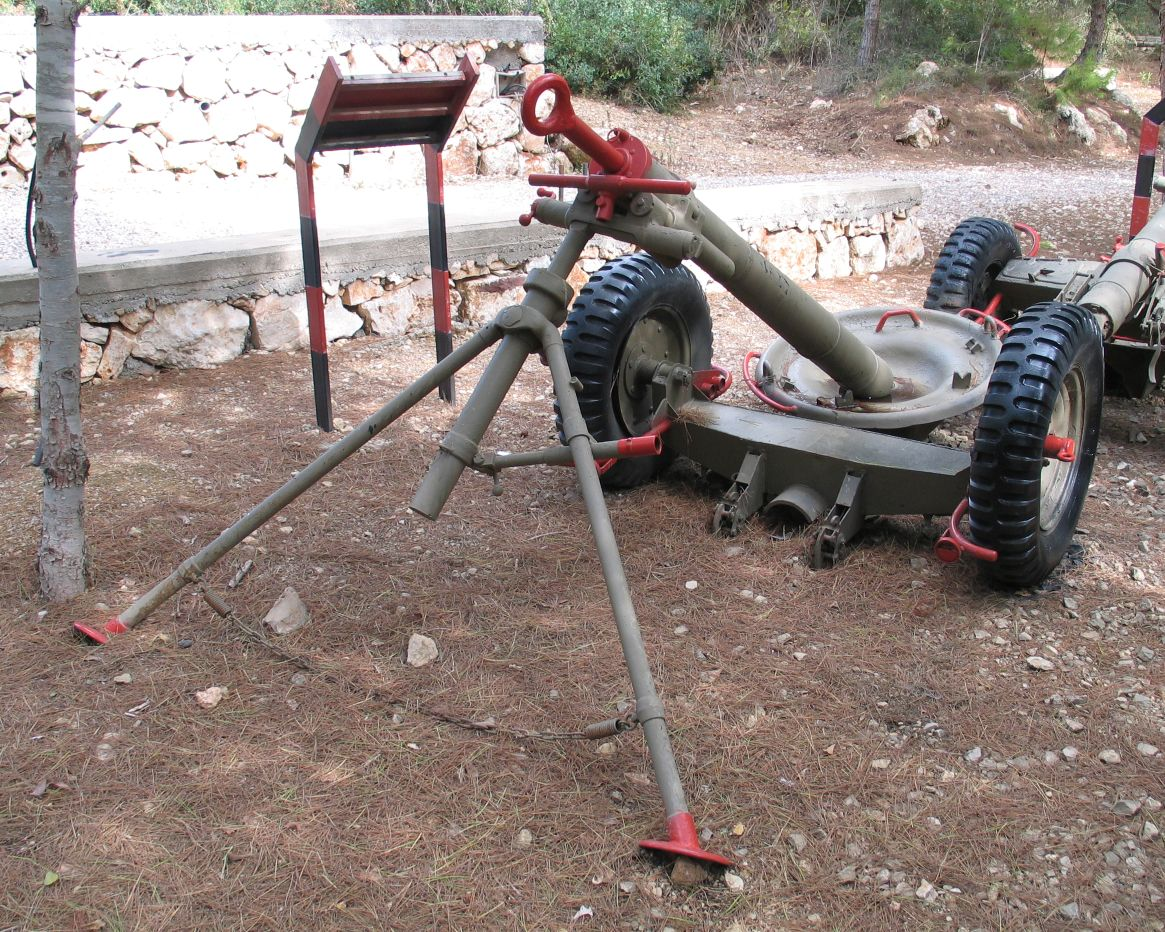
Soltam M-65 120 mm heavy mortar in Beyt ha-Totchan Museum, Zikhron Ya'akov, Israel.

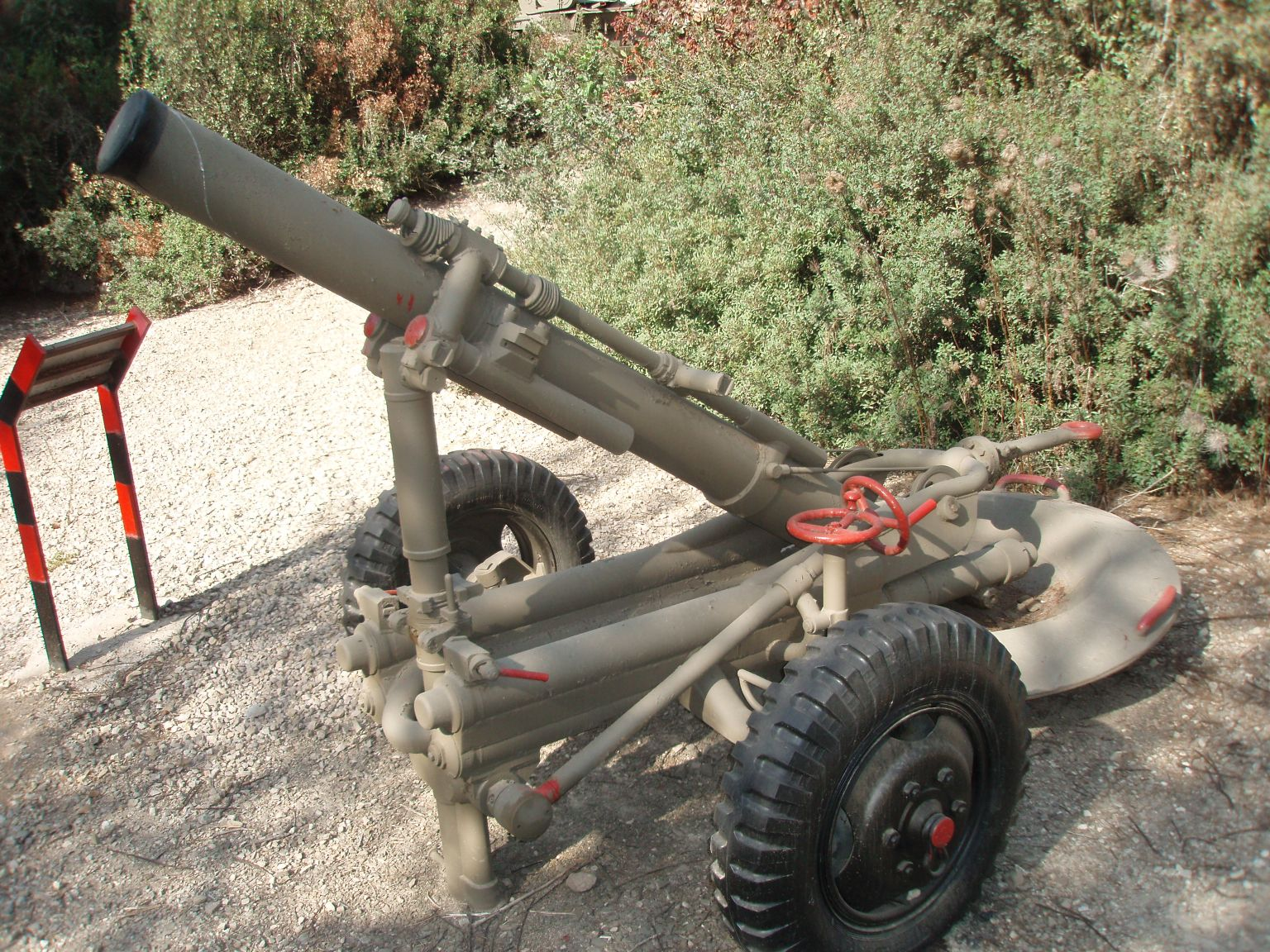
Soltam M-66 160 mm heavy mortar in Beyt ha-Totchan Museum, Zikhron Ya'akov, Israel.

- Type E1 51 mm Light mortar
- L16 81mm mortar
- Thomson-Brandt MO-60-L 60 mm light mortar
- M224 60 mm lightweight mortar (LWCMS)
- M2 60 mm mortar
- M29 81 mm mortar
- 82-PM-41 82 mm mortar
- 2B14-1 Podnos 82 mm mortar
- M30 4.2 inch (106.7mm) mortar
- M1938 107 mm mortar
- Hotchkiss-Brandt TDA MO-120-RT-61 120 mm towed heavy mortar
- 120-PM-38 (M-1938) 120 mm heavy mortar
- 120-PM-43 (M-1943) 120 mm heavy mortar
- Soltam M-65 120 mm heavy mortar (mostly mounted on M3/M9 half-tracks and modified M113 APCs)
- Soltam M-66 160 mm heavy mortar (mostly mounted on M3/M9 half-tracks and Makmat mortar carriers)
- MT-13 (M1943) 160 mm heavy mortar
- 2S4 240 mm towed breech-loading heavy mortar

=== Rocket and missile systems ===
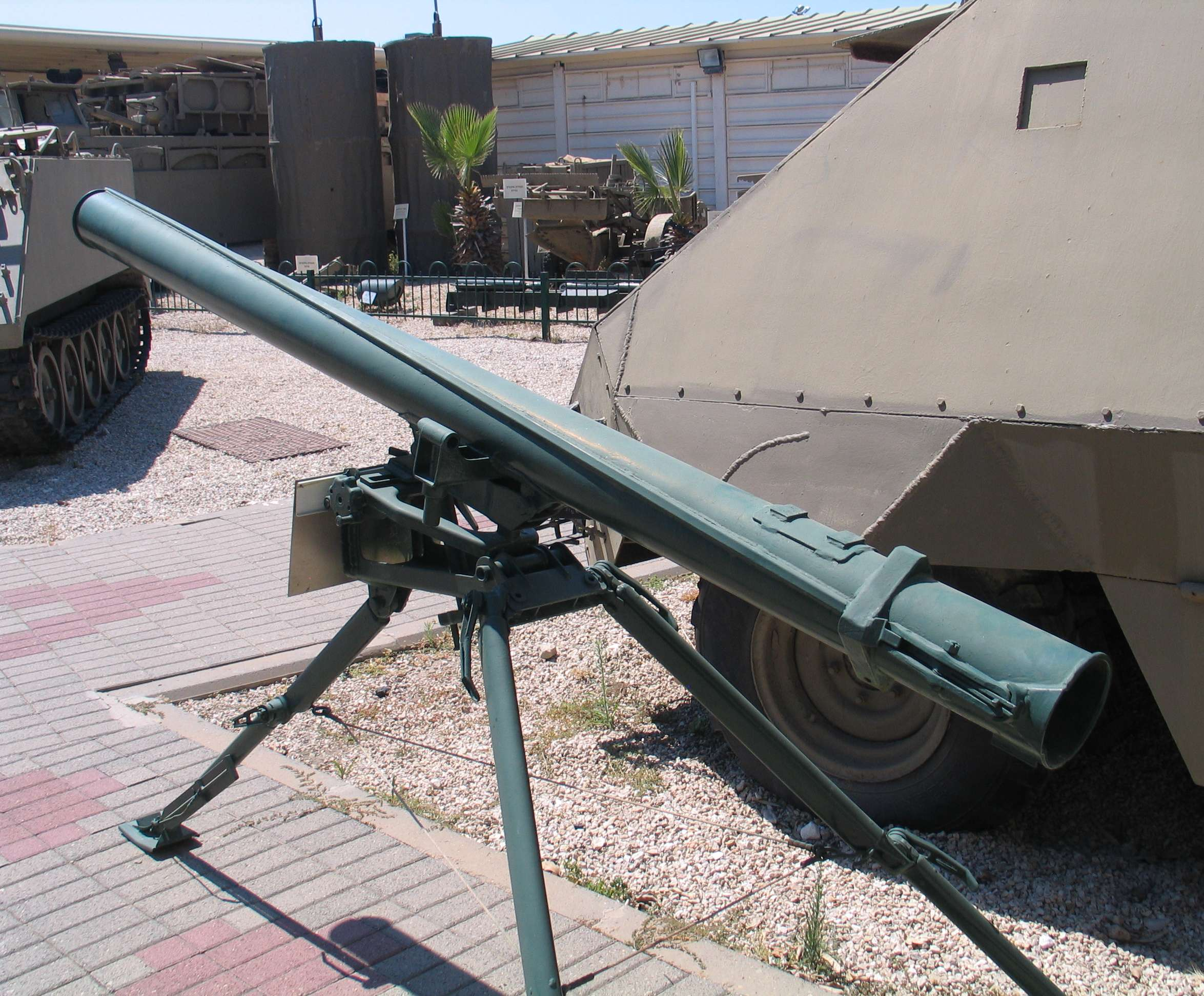
DKB Grad-P 122 mm single-tube rocket launcher system in Batey Ha-Osef Museum, Tel Aviv, Israel.

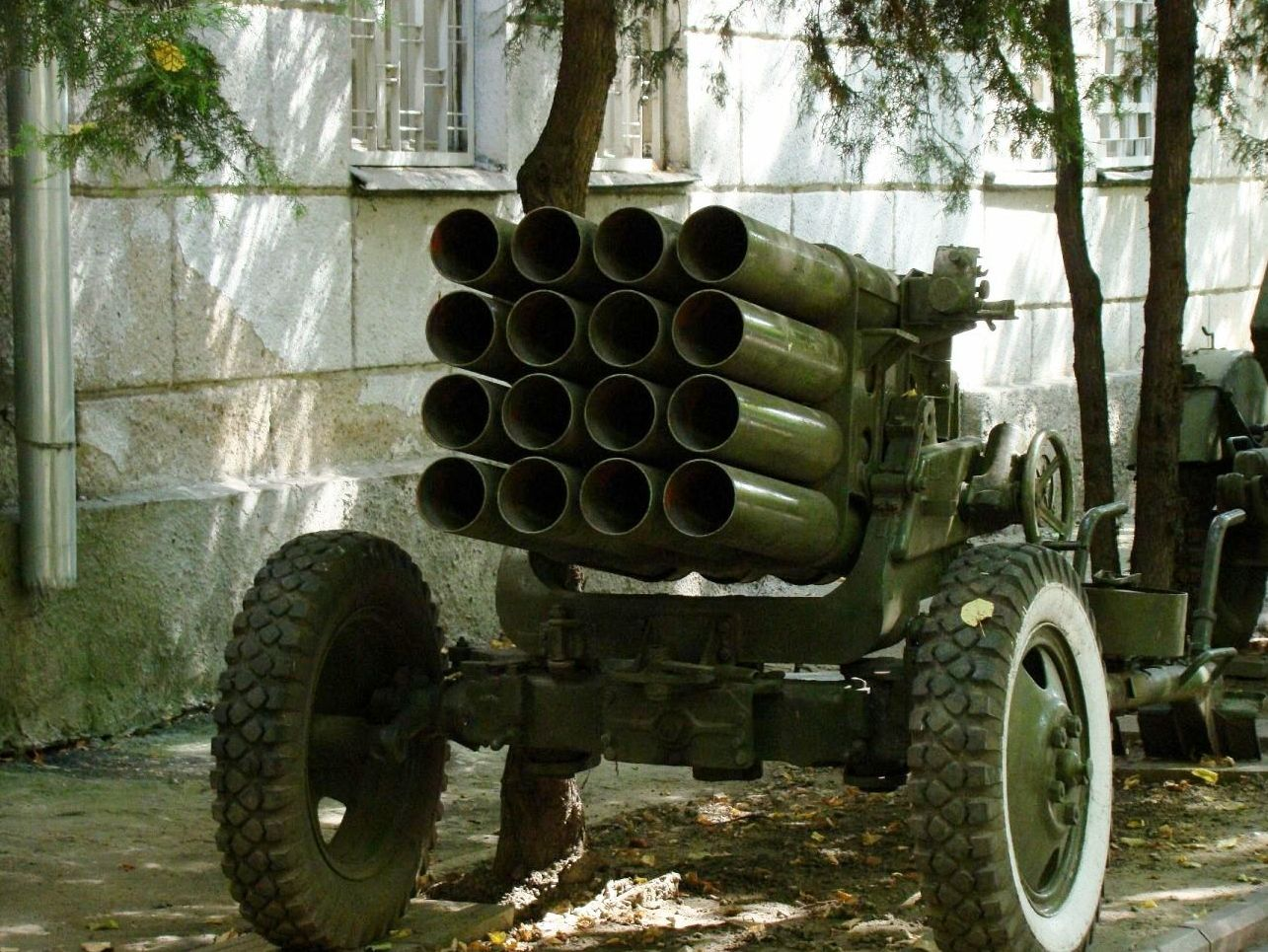
BM-14 140mm, 16-round towed launcher (Type 81).

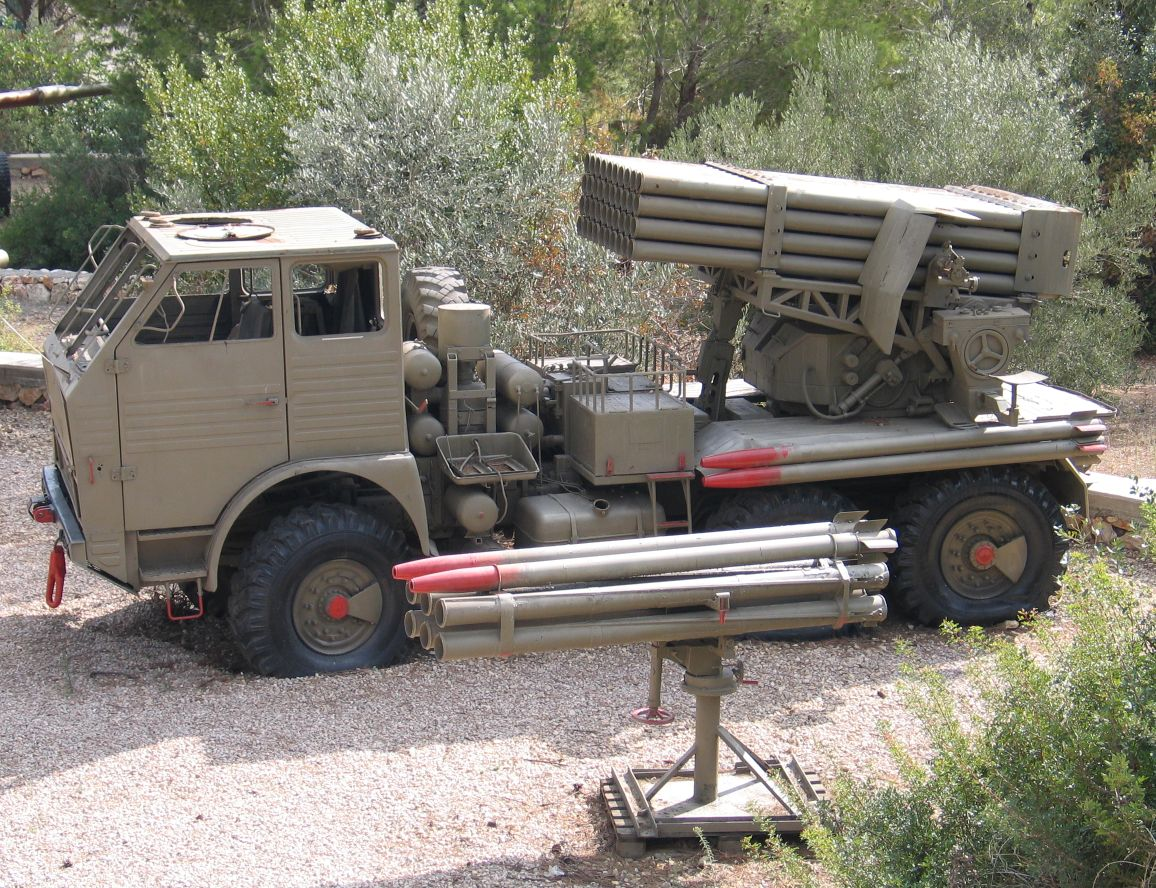
Ex-Lebanese Forces APR-40/RO-40 128 mm 6-tube multiple rocket launcher mounted on a DAC chassis in Beyt ha-Totchan Museum, Zikhron Ya'akov, Israel.

- DKB Grad-P 122 mm Light portable rocket system
- BM-11 122 mm multiple rocket launcher (North Korean 30-tube version of the BM-21 Grad mounted on an unlicensed copy of the Japanese-manufactured Isuzu HTS12G 2.5 ton truck)
- BM-13 122 mm multiple rocket launcher
- BM-21 Grad 122 mm multiple rocket launcher
- RL-21 (Sakr-36) 122 mm multiple rocket launcher (Egyptian 30-tube version of the BM-11 mounted on a Soviet-manufactured ZIL-157 general-purpose truck)
- APR-40/RO-40 128 mm multiple rocket launcher
- Type 63 107 mm towed multiple rocket launcher (Chinese version of the BM-12 mounted on Technicals)
- Type 81 140 mm towed multiple rocket launcher (Chinese version of the BM-14 mounted on Technicals)
- FIM-43 Redeye surface-to-air missile
- SA-7 Grail surface-to-air missile
- Frog-7 short-range artillery rocket
- SS.11 anti-tank missile (mounted on ACMAT TPK 4.20-NA12 trucks and Gazelle helicopter gunships)
- SS.12 anti-tank missile (mounted on ACMAT TPK 4.20-NA12 trucks and Gazelle helicopter gunships)
- HOT anti-tank missile (mounted on Gazelle helicopter gunships)
- SNEB 68 mm (2.7-inch) unguided rocket projectile (fired from locally-built eight-tube Multiple rocket launchers installed on Technicals)
- Homebuilt short-range rockets (fired from an adapted ZPU-4 AA gun mount installed on Unimog light trucks)

=== Anti-tank guns ===
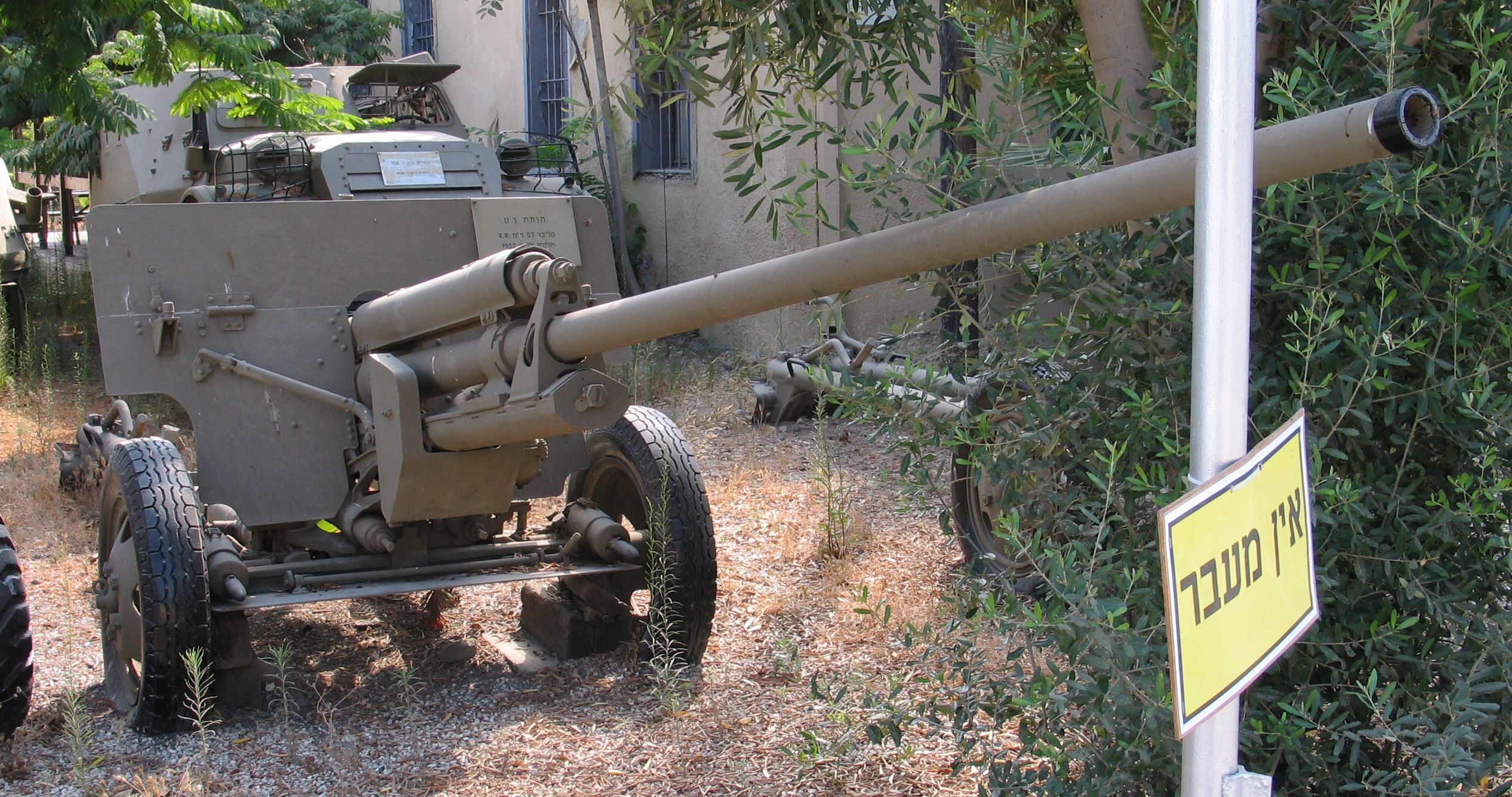
ZiS-2 57 mm anti-tank gun in Batey Ha-Osef Museum, Tel Aviv, Israel, 2005.

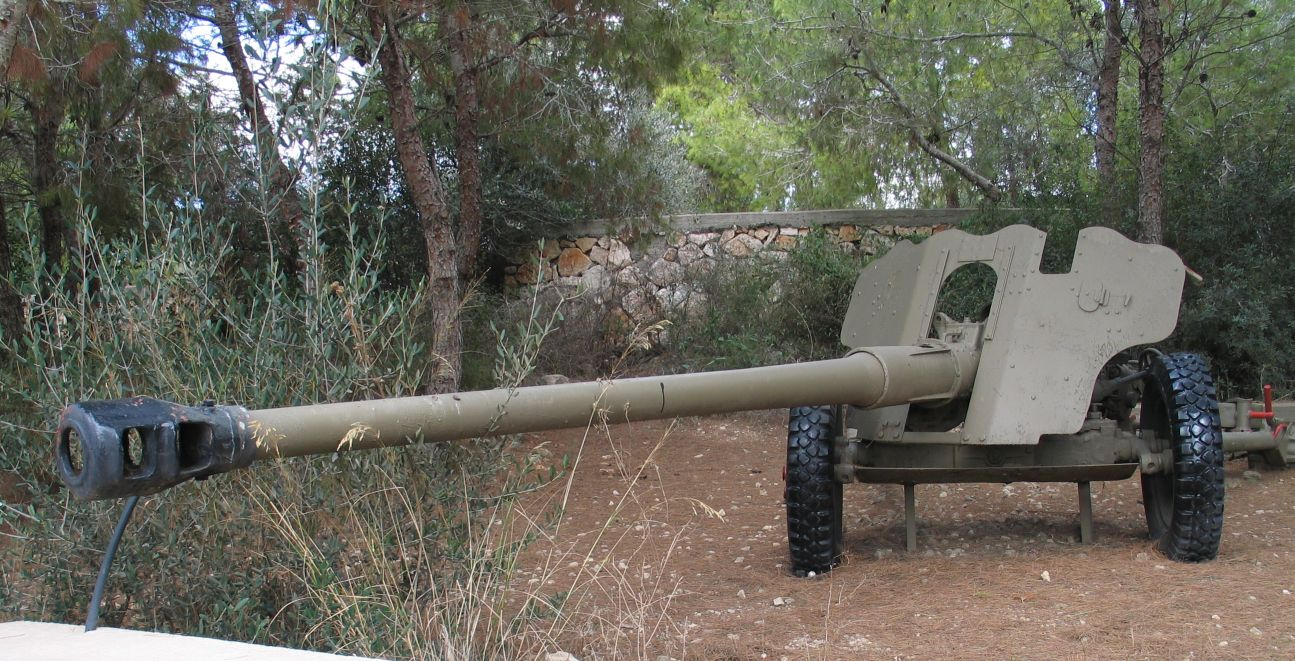
D-44 85 mm anti-tank gun in Beyt ha-Totchan Museum, Zikhron Ya'akov, Israel.

- ZiS-2 57 mm anti-tank gun
- ZiS-3 76.2mm anti-tank gun
- D-44 85 mm anti-tank gun
- D-48 85 mm towed anti-tank gun
- DEFA D921/GT-2 90 mm towed anti-tank gun (mounted on M3/M9 half tracks)

=== Anti-aircraft guns and Autocannons ===
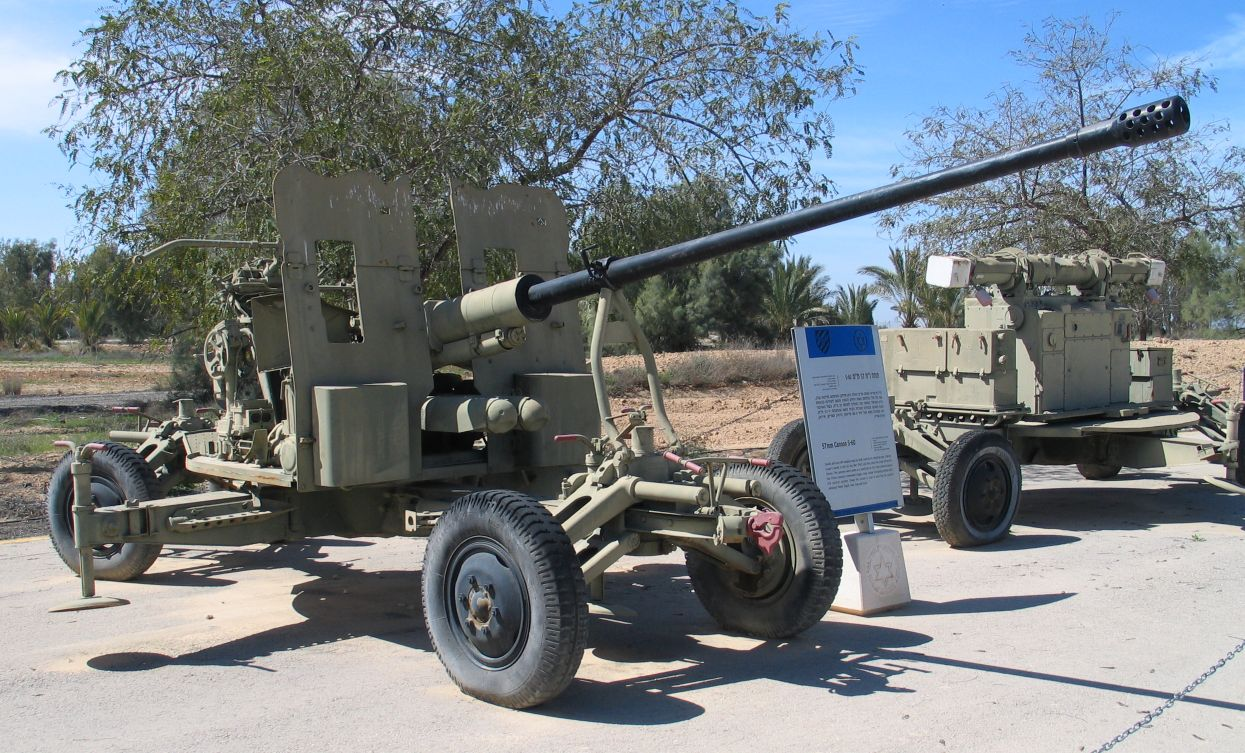
AZP S-60 57 mm anti-aircraft gun in Hatzerim Israel Airforce Museum, Beersheba, Israel.

- M1939 (61-K) 37 mm anti-aircraft gun (mounted on Unimog light trucks)
- AZP S-60 57 mm anti-aircraft gun
- Bofors 40 mm L/60 anti-aircraft gun (mounted on cargo trucks and BTR-152 APCs)
- M621 20 mm chain-fed cannon (fitted on Gazelle helicopter gunships)
- Zastava M55 A2 20 mm autocannon (mostly mounted on technicals, cargo trucks and M113 APCs)
- Hispano-Suiza HS.661 30 mm autocannon
- Vz.53 12.7 mm quadruple-barrelled AA gun
- ZPU (ZPU-1, ZPU-2, ZPU-4) 14.5mm autocannons (mostly mounted on technicals, M113 APCs and M3/M9 half tracks)
- ZU-23-2 23 mm autocannon (mostly mounted on technicals, cargo trucks, M113 and BTR-152 APCs)
- Type 85/YW 306 23 mm autocannon (Chinese-produced version of the ZU-23-2, mounted on technicals, cargo trucks and M113 APCs)

=== Howitzers ===
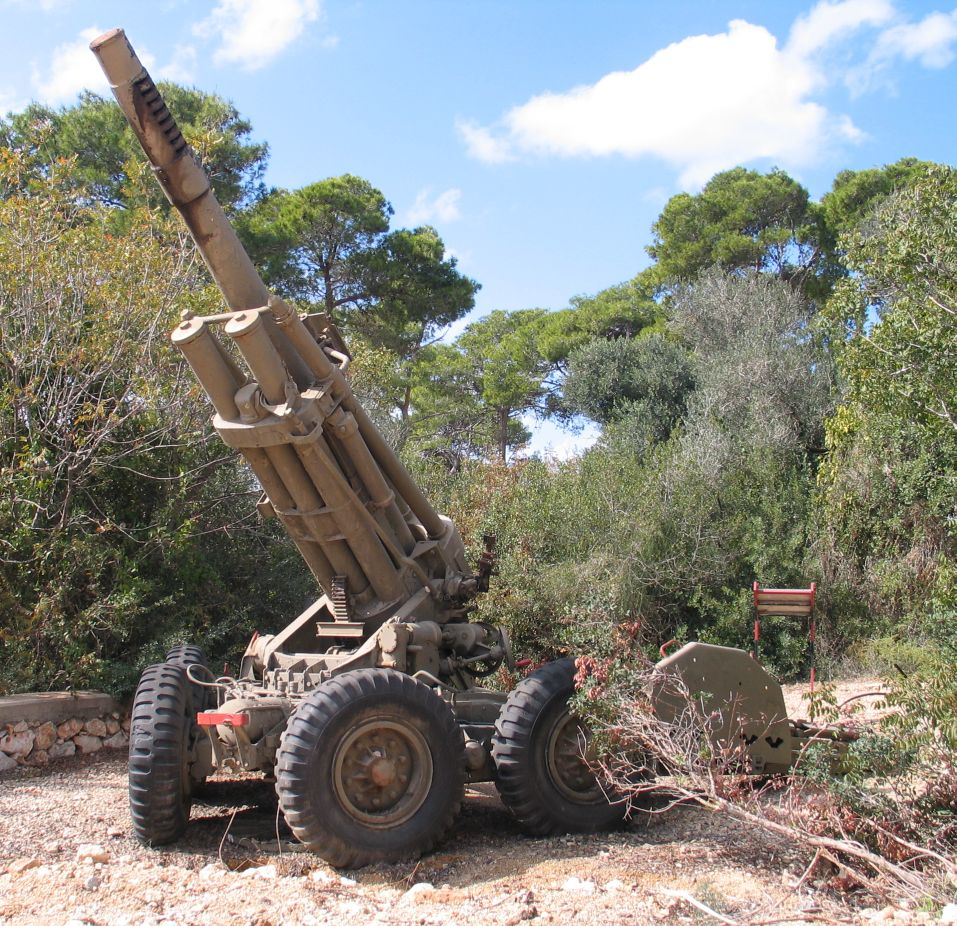
Mle 1950 BF-50 155 mm howitzer in Beyt ha-Totchan Museum, Zikhron Ya'akov, Israel.

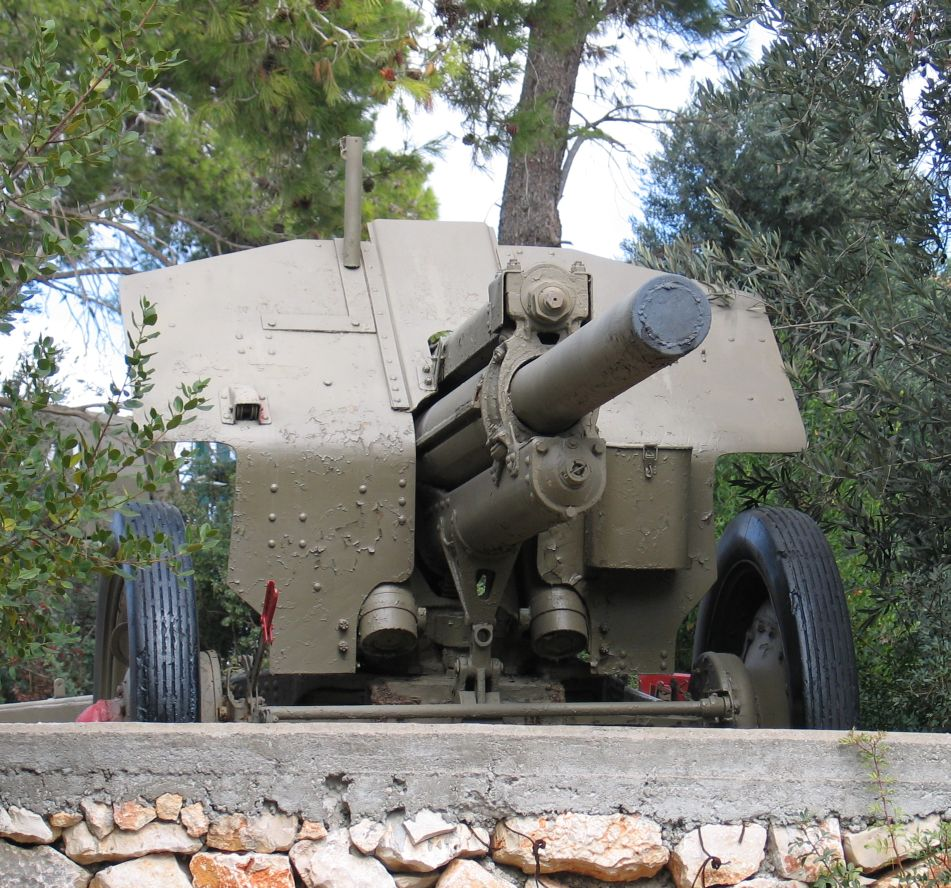
M-30 122 mm howitzer in Beyt ha-Totchan museum, Zikhron Ya'akov, Israel.

- QF Mk III 25-Pounder field gun
- Soltam M-71 155 mm 39 caliber towed howitzer
- M101A1 105 mm towed field howitzer
- M102 105 mm light towed field howitzer
- M114A1 155 mm towed field howitzer
- Mle 1950 BF-50 155 mm howitzer
- M198 155 mm howitzer
- FH-70 155 mm field howitzer
- M1938 (M-30) 122 mm howitzer
- 2A18 (D-30) 122 mm howitzer
- M1944 (BS-3) 100 mm anti-tank and field gun
- M1954 (M-46) 130 mm towed field gun
- Type 59-1 130 mm field gun (Chinese-made gun derived from the Soviet M-46)
- M1955 (D-20) 152 mm towed gun-howitzer

=== Armoured vehicles ===
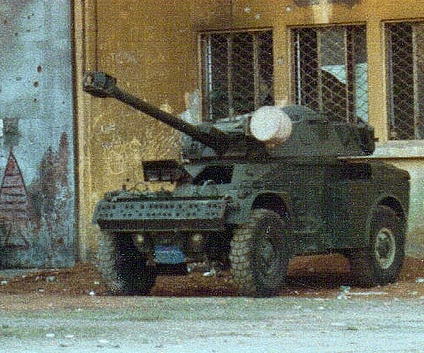
AML-90 of the Lebanese Army in Beirut, 1982.

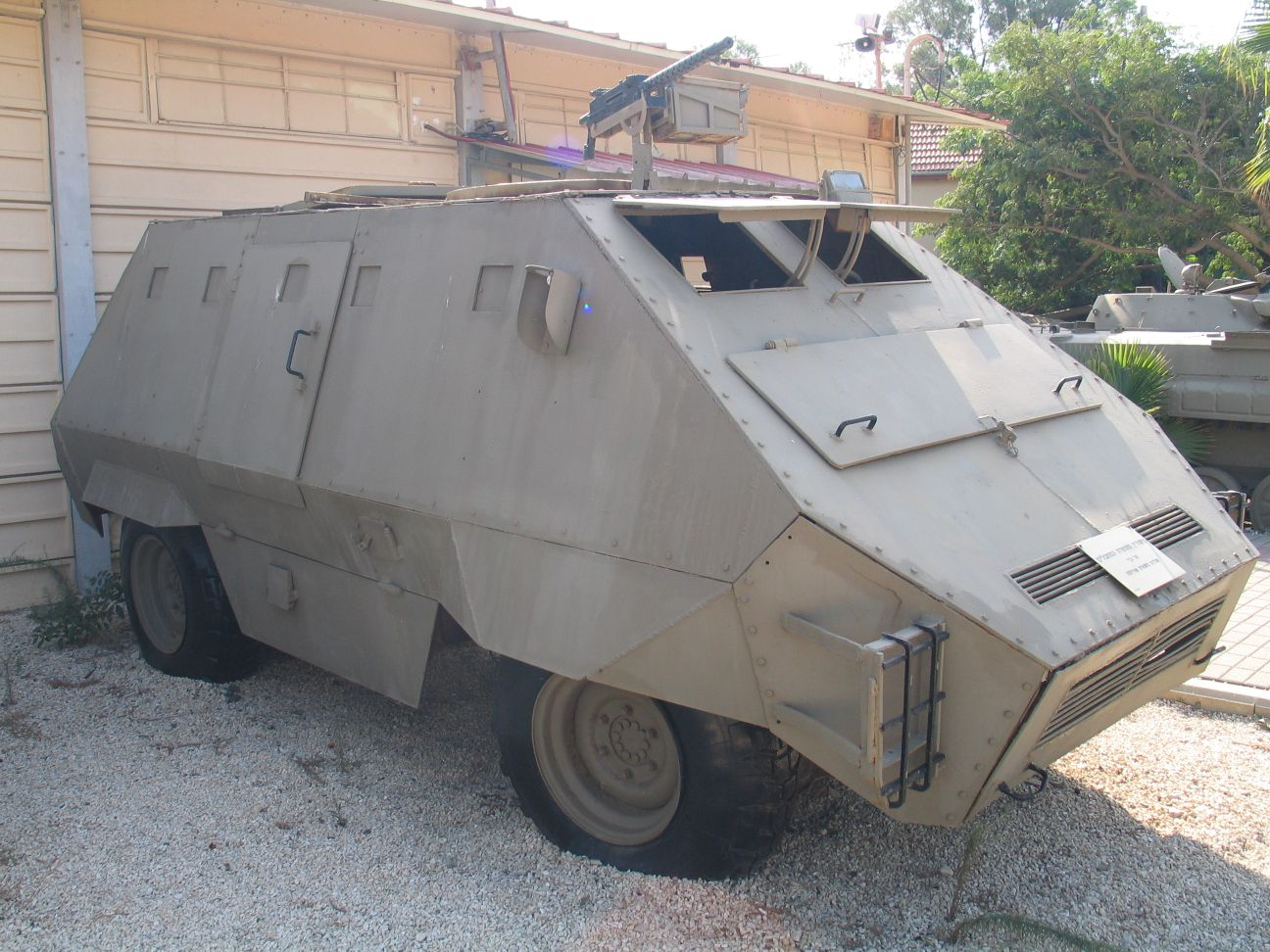
Ex-PLO built UR-416 clone in Batey Ha-Osef Museum, Tel Aviv, Israel, 2005.

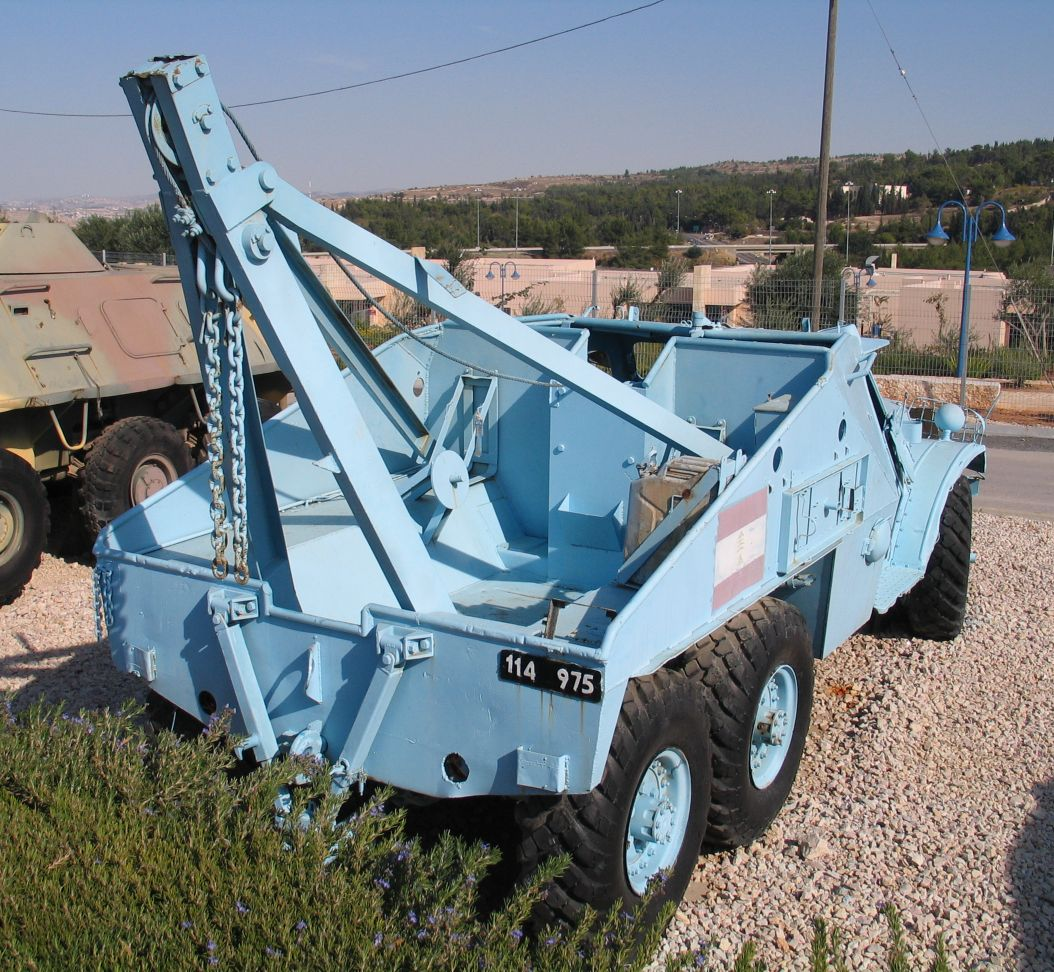
BTR-152 converted into an ARV by the South Lebanese Army in Yad La-Shiryon Museum, Latrun, Israel, 2005.

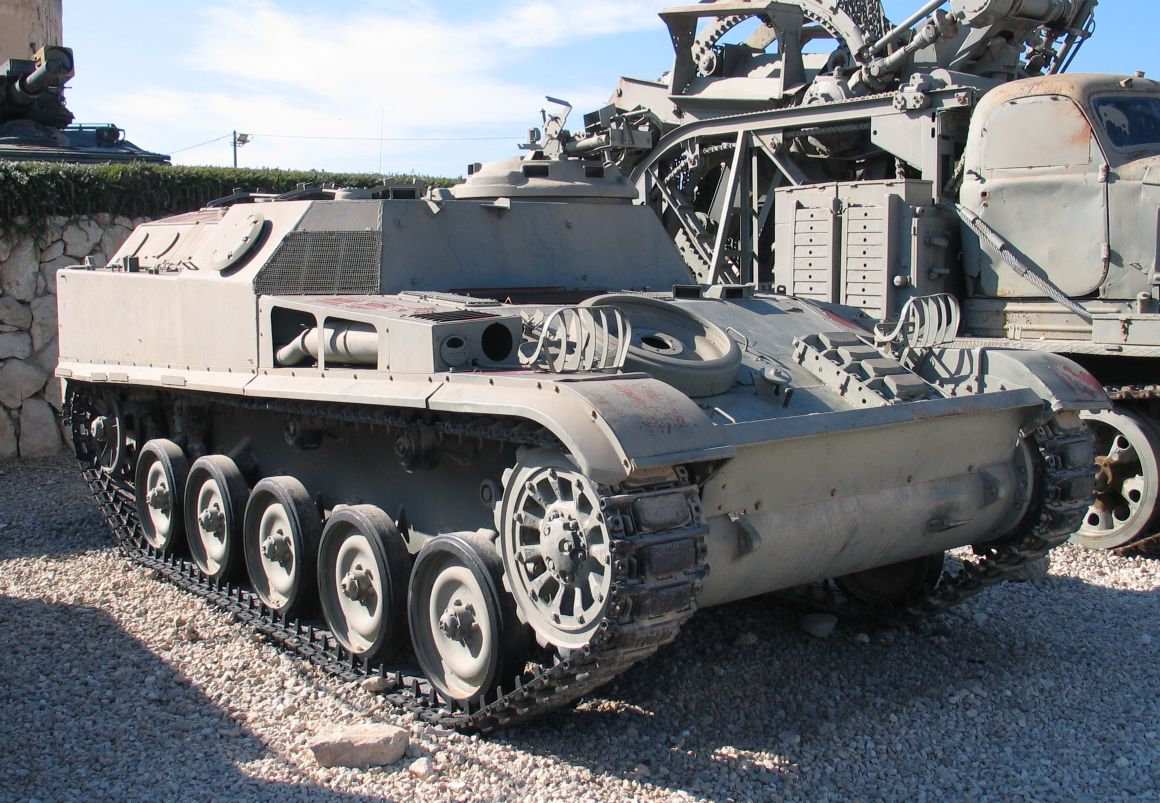
Ex-Lebanese Army AMX-VCI in Yad La-Shiryon Museum, Latrun, Israel, 2005.

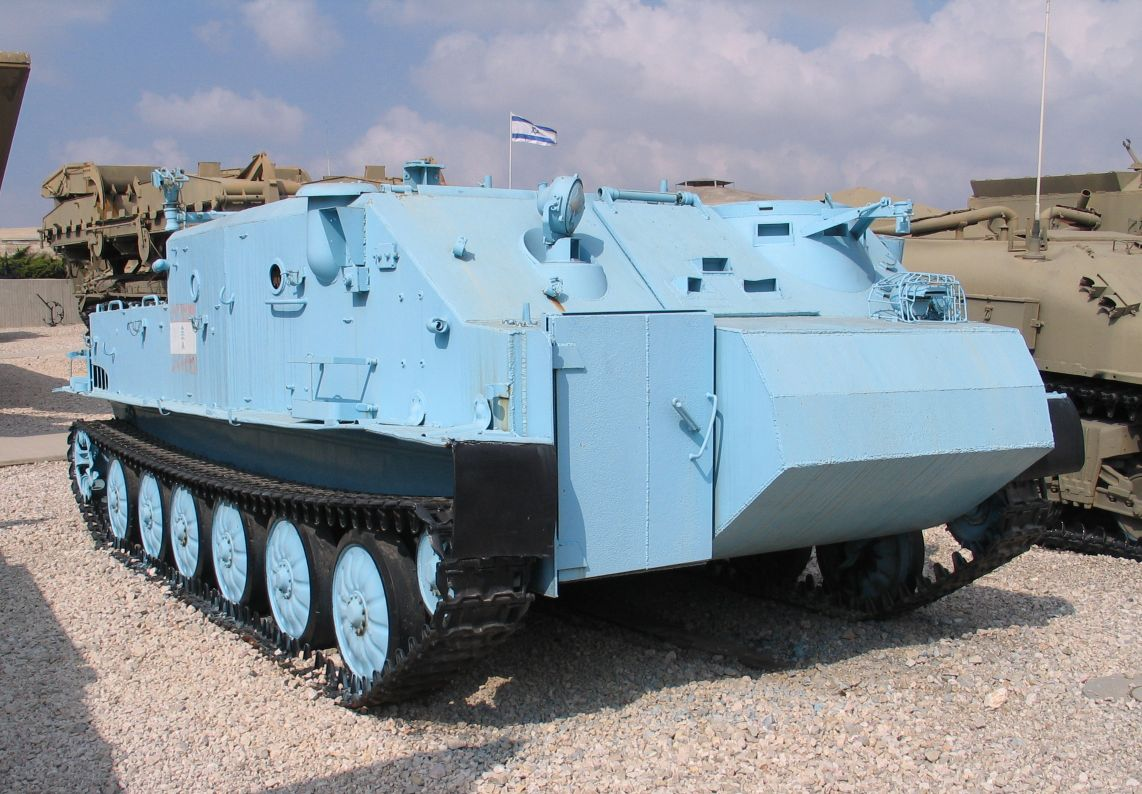
BTR-50PK converted into a Medevac vehicle by the South Lebanese Army in Yad La-Shiryon Museum, Latrun, Israel, 2005.

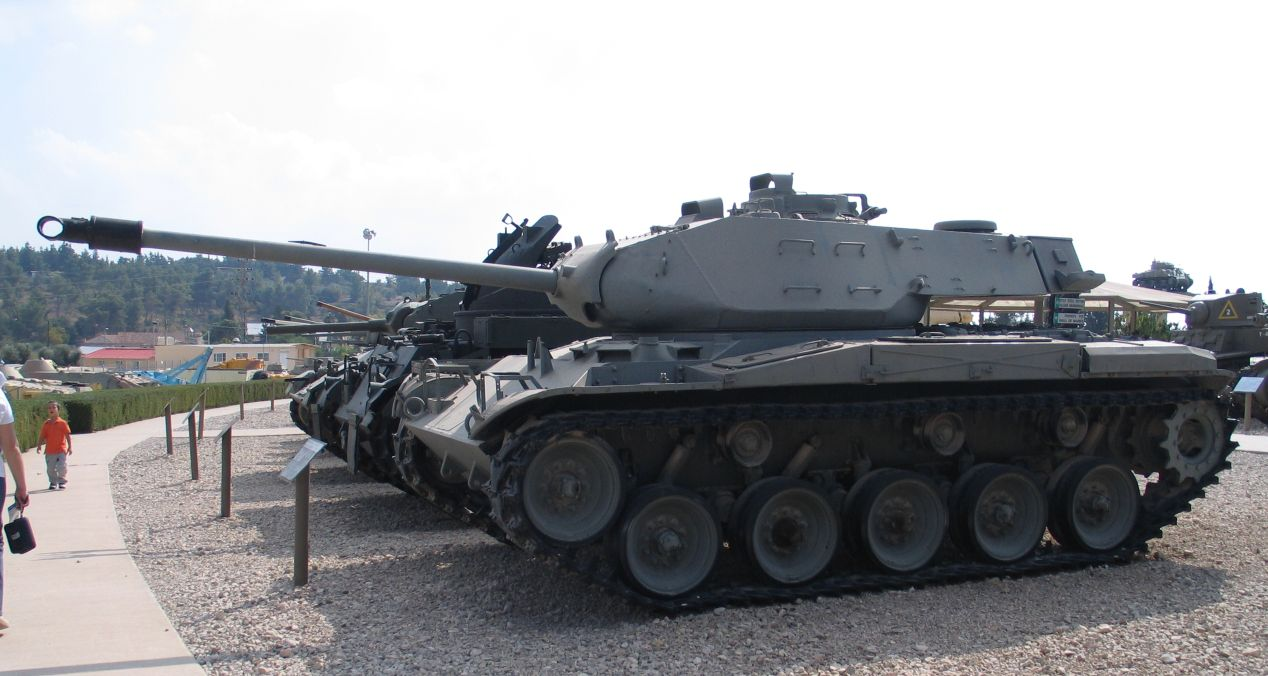
Ex-Lebanese Army M41A3 light tank in Yad La-Shiryon Museum, Latrun, Israel, 2005.

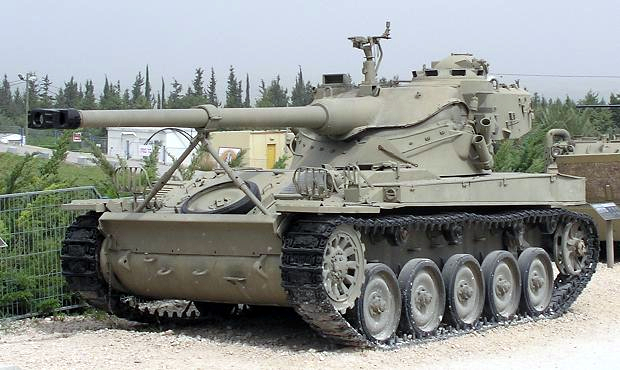
Ex-Lebanese Army AMX-13 light tank in Yad La-Shiryon Museum, Latrun, Israel, 2005.

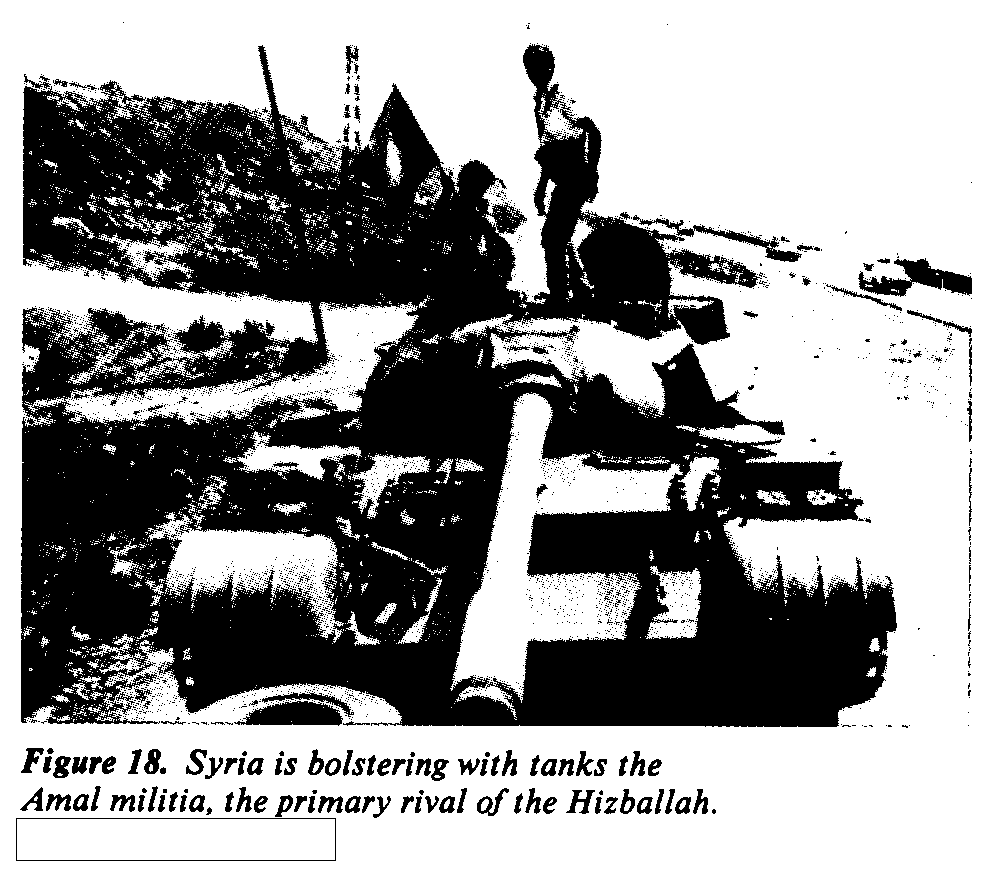
Amal fighters manning a T-55A tank provided by Syria, Beirut 1980s.

- AMX-13 light tank (75 mm, 90 mm, and 105 mm gun versions)
- M41A3 Walker Bulldog light tank
- Sherman Firefly Mk Vc medium tank
- Sherman M-50 medium tank
- T-34/85 medium tank
- T-54A, T-54B and T-55A main battle tanks
- T-62 main battle tank
- Ti-67 (Tiran 4 and Tiran 5) main battle tanks (Israeli-modified versions of the T-54/55)
- M48A1 and M48A5 main battle tanks
- Charioteer tank destroyer
- M42A1 Duster SPAAG
- ZSU-23-4M1 Shilka SPAAG
- Ferret armoured car
- Shorland Mk 1 Patrol Car
- BRDM-2 amphibious armoured scout car
- Cadillac Gage V-100 Commando armoured car
- Staghound armoured car
- Panhard AML-90 armoured car
- Alvis Saladin armoured car
- IAI/Ramta RAM-2V Armoured Reconnaissance Vehicle
- IAI/Ramta RBY-2 Scout Armoured Reconnaissance Vehicle
- Bravia V-200 Chaimite armoured car
- UR-416 armoured car
- BTR-152 armoured personnel carrier
- BTR-50PK amphibious armoured personnel carrier
- BTR-60PB armoured personnel carrier
- VAB armoured personnel carrier
- Alvis Saracen armoured personnel carrier
- Panhard M3 VTT armoured personnel carrier
- M3/M9 Zahlam half-track
- M59 armored personnel carrier
- M113 armored personnel carrier and M113 ACAV
- AMX-VCI armoured personnel carrier
- BMP-1 armoured personnel carrier
- M577 command vehicle
- M113 modified mortar carrier
- M106 mortar carrier
- M125A2 mortar carrier
- Makmat mortar carrier
- Homebuilt armoured cars

=== Technicals, Gun trucks, transport and recovery vehicles ===
- Hotchkiss M201 jeep (French-produced version of the Willys MB jeep)
- Willys M38 MC jeep
- Willys M38A1 MD jeep
- Willys CJ-3B jeep
- Jeep CJ-5 and Jeep CJ-8 (Civilian versions of the Willys M38A1 MD jeep)
- Keohwa KH-5GA1 and Kia KM410 jeeps (South Korean-produced versions of the Willys M38A1 MD jeep)
- M151A1/A2 ¼-ton utility truck
- GAZ-69A field car
- UAZ-469 light utility vehicle
- Kaiser M715 jeep
- VIASA MB-CJ6 jeep (Spanish-produced version of the Willys CJ-3B jeep)
- Santana Series III (Spanish-produced version of the Land-Rover long wheelbase series III)
- Santana 88 Ligero Military jeep
- Austin Champ light truck
- Land-Rover short and long wheelbase series II-III
- Range Rover first generation luxury Sport utility vehicle (SUV)
- Morattab Series IV utility vehicle (Iranian-produced unlicensed version of the Land-Rover long wheelbase series III)
- Pinzgauer 712M light all-terrain vehicle
- Volvo Laplander L3314A light utility vehicle
- Toyota Land Cruiser (J40) light pickup
- Toyota Land Cruiser (J42) light pickup
- Toyota Land Cruiser (J43) light pickup
- Toyota Land Cruiser (J44) light pickup
- Toyota Land Cruiser (J45) light pickup
- Toyota Land Cruiser (J70) light pickup
- Toyota Land Cruiser (J75) light pickup
- Peugeot 404 light pickup
- Peugeot 504 light pickup
- ACMAT TPK 4.20-NA12 utility truck
- Dodge WC51 light truck
- Dodge M37 ¾ ton 4x4 1953 utility truck
- Dodge Fargo/Power Wagon W200 light truck
- Dodge D series (3rd generation) light pickup
- Dodge Ram (1st generation) light pickup
- GMC Sierra Custom K25/K30 light pickup
- Chevrolet C-10/C-15 Cheyenne light pickup
- Chevrolet C-20 Scottsdale light pickup
- Chevrolet C/K 3rd generation pickup truck
- Nissan Patrol 160-Series pickup (3rd generation)
- Nissan/Datsun 620 pickup truck
- Datsun 720 pickup truck
- Suzuki Jimny LJ20 1st generation off-road mini SUV
- Gurgel Sport utility vehicle (SUV)
- Jeep Wagoneer full-size Sport utility vehicle (SUV)
- Jeep Gladiator J20 pickup truck
- M880/M890 Series CUCV
- Toyota Dyna U10-series light-duty truck
- Toyota U10-series route van (minibus)
- M718A1 military ambulance
- Nissan Patrol 160-Series (3rd generation) 5-door wagon/van (used as military ambulance)
- Chevrolet/GMC G-Series third generation van (used as military ambulance)
- Volkswagen Type 2 Transporter minibus (used as military ambulance)
- Volkswagen (Type 2) T3 Transporter van (used as military ambulance)
- Volkswagen Type 2 Transporter Pickup
- AIL M325 Command Car ("Nun-Nun": cargo A/B, combat patrol and ambulance versions)
- Mercedes-Benz Unimog 404 light truck
- Mercedes-Benz Unimog 416 light truck
- GAZ-66 light truck
- Chevrolet C-50 medium-duty truck
- Dodge F600 medium-duty truck
- Mercedes-Benz 4.5 ton L1517 medium-duty truck
- Mercedes-Benz 4.5 ton LA911B medium-duty truck
- GMC K1500 medium-duty truck
- GMC C4500 medium-duty truck
- GMC C7500 heavy-duty truck
- Bedford RL Petrol lorry
- GMC CCKW 2½-ton cargo truck
- M34 and M35A2 2½-ton cargo trucks
- ZIL-151 general-purpose truck
- ZIL-157 general-purpose truck
- ZIL-131 general-purpose truck
- Ural-4320 AWD general purpose truck
- Saviem SM8 TRM4000 truck
- Berliet GBC 8KT heavy-duty truck
- M813 5-ton cargo truck
- Faun L912/21-MUN heavy cargo truck
- M54A2 5-ton heavy cargo truck
- KrAZ-255 heavy cargo truck
- M5A1 artillery tractor
- M816 5-ton medium wrecker truck
- M88A1 medium recovery vehicle
- M578 light recovery vehicle
- T-34T Armoured Recovery Vehicle
- BTS-4 Armoured Recovery Vehicle
- VT-55KS Armoured Recovery Vehicle
- MAZ-537G tank transporter
- Mack DM 800 tank transporter
- XM523E2 Heavy Equipment Transporter (HET)
- Ratrack dual track snow coach

=== Vehicle-borne improvised explosive devices ===
- Car bomb (known in the Lebanese lexicon as "canned death")
- Suicide truck-bomb

=== Helicopters ===
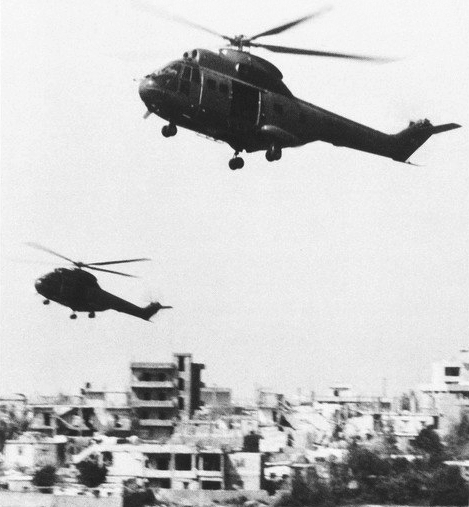
A pair of Lebanese Air Force Aérospatiale SA 330C Pumas flying over Beirut, 1983.

- Aérospatiale SA 315B Lama II light helicopter
- Aérospatiale SA 316B/C Alouette III light helicopter
- Aérospatiale SA 330C Puma medium transport/utility helicopter
- Aérospatiale SA 342K/L Gazelle helicopter (used mainly in the gunship role)
- Agusta-Bell AB 212 utility transport

=== Aircraft ===
- Dassault Mirage IIIEL fighter jet
- Potez CM.170R Fouga Magister jet trainer (used mainly in the fighter-bomber role)
- Hawker Hunter FGA.70 and FGA.70A fighter jets (used mainly in the fighter-bomber role)
- Scottish Aviation Bulldog T-1 Model 126 trainer (used also in the reconnaissance/observation role)

=== Naval craft ===
- EDIC III-class Landing craft tank (LCT)
- EDIC9091-class Landing craft utility (LCU)
- LCU1466-class Landing craft utility (LCU)
- Aztec-class inshore patrol boat
- Byblos-class oceanic patrol vessel
- Fairey Marine Tracker MkII Class patrol boat
- Dabur-1 class patrol boat
- Dvora-class fast patrol boat
- Rubber inflatable dinghy
- Zodiac rubber inflatable boat
- Converted civilian fishing craft (armed with Heavy machine-guns)

== See also ==
- Lebanese Air Force aircraft inventory
- Lebanese Armed Forces Out of Service Equipment
- Lebanese Civil War
- Lebanese Ground Forces Equipment
- Military equipment of Hezbollah
- Syrian intervention in Lebanon
- 1958 Lebanon crisis
- 1982 Lebanon War
