= Technical (vehicle) =

Improvised fighting vehicle

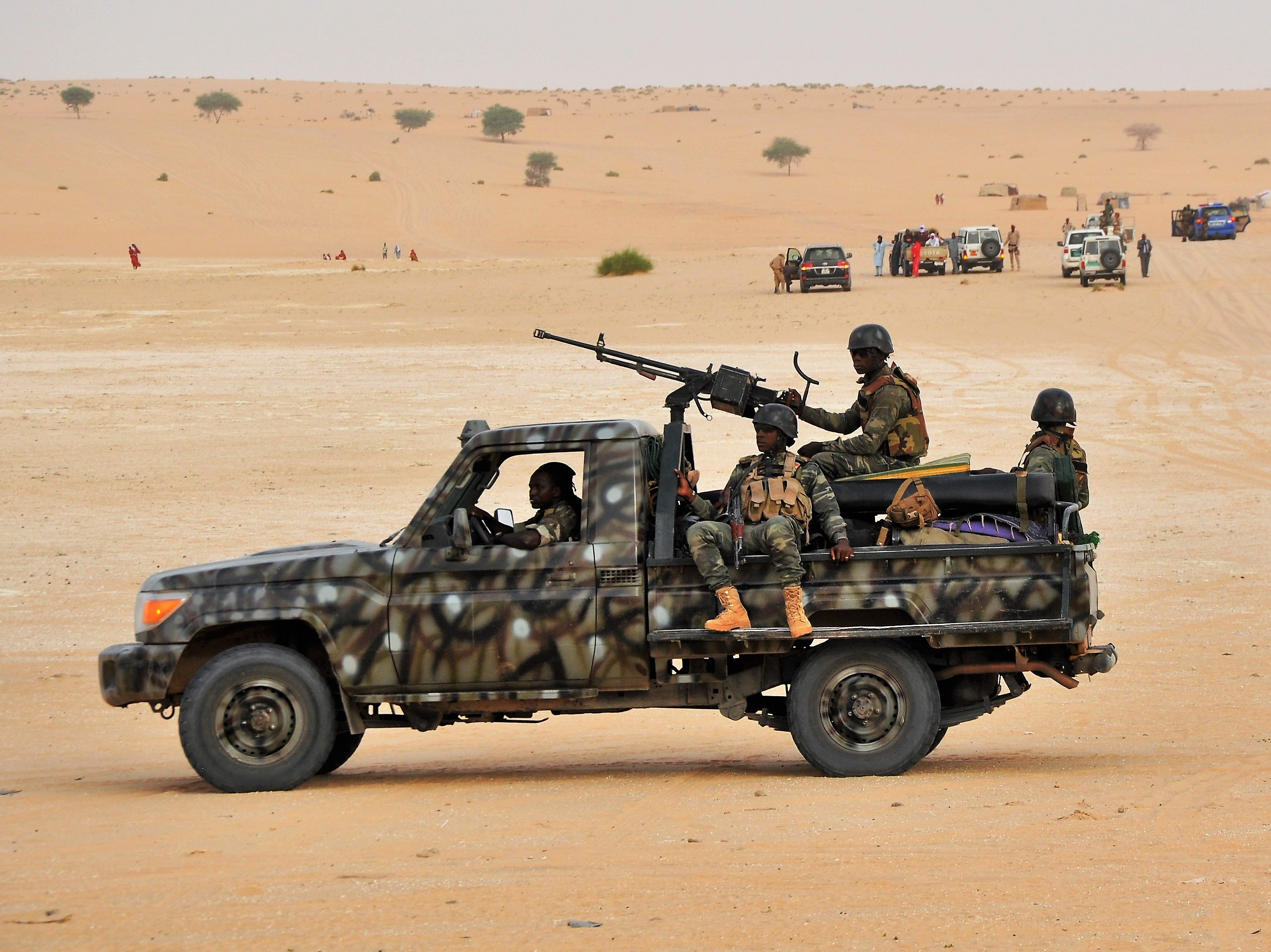
A Niger Armed Forces Toyota Land Cruiser technical armed with a mounted Type 77 heavy machine gun in N'Gourti, Niger, 2019

A technical, known as a non-standard tactical vehicle (NSTV) in United States military parlance, is a light improvised fighting vehicle which has been modified to mount small arms and light weapons (SALW) and heavy weaponry.

The vehicles most commonly used to make technicals are open-backed civilian pickup trucks and vehicles with four-wheel drive capabilities. Armaments used include machine guns, automatic grenade launchers, anti-aircraft autocannons, rotary cannons, anti-tank weapons, anti-tank guns, anti-tank guided missiles, mortars, multiple rocket launchers, recoilless rifles, and other support weaponry. Technicals perform a similar function to gun trucks and self-propelled guns, but are helpless against more advanced weaponry and superior air power.

== Etymology ==
The neologism technical describing such a vehicle is believed to have originated in Somalia during the Somali Civil War in the early 1990s. Barred from bringing in private security, non-governmental organizations hired local gunmen to protect their personnel, using money defined as "technical assistance grants". The term broadened to include any vehicle carrying armed men.

An alternative account is given by Michael Maren, who says the term was first used in Somalia in the 1980s, after engineers from Soviet arms manufacturer Tekniko mounted weapons on vehicles for the Somali National Movement during the Somaliland War of Independence. Technicals have also been referred to as battlewagons and gunwagons.

In Russia and Ukraine, technicals are often referred to as tachanka, a reference to horse-drawn machine gun platforms from the First World War and Russian Civil War.

== Features ==
Among irregular militaries, often centered on the perceived strength and charisma of male warlords, the prestige of technicals is strong. According to one article, "The Technical is the most significant symbol of power in southern Somalia. It is a small truck with large tripod machine guns mounted on the back. A warlord's power is measured by how many of these vehicles he has." Technicals are not commonly used by well-funded militaries that are able to procure purpose-built combat vehicles, because the soft-skinned civilian vehicles that technicals are based on do not offer much armor protection to crew and passengers.

Technicals fill the niche of traditional light cavalry. Generally costing much less than purpose-built combat vehicles, the major asset of technicals is speed and mobility, as well as their ability to strike from unexpected directions with automatic fire and light troop deployment. The reliability of vehicles such as the Toyota Hilux is useful for forces that lack the repair-related infrastructure of a conventional military on land. In direct engagements they are no match for heavier vehicles, such as tanks or other armored fighting vehicles, and they are mostly helpless against any air support from a proper military.

== History ==
=== Prototypes and early usage ===
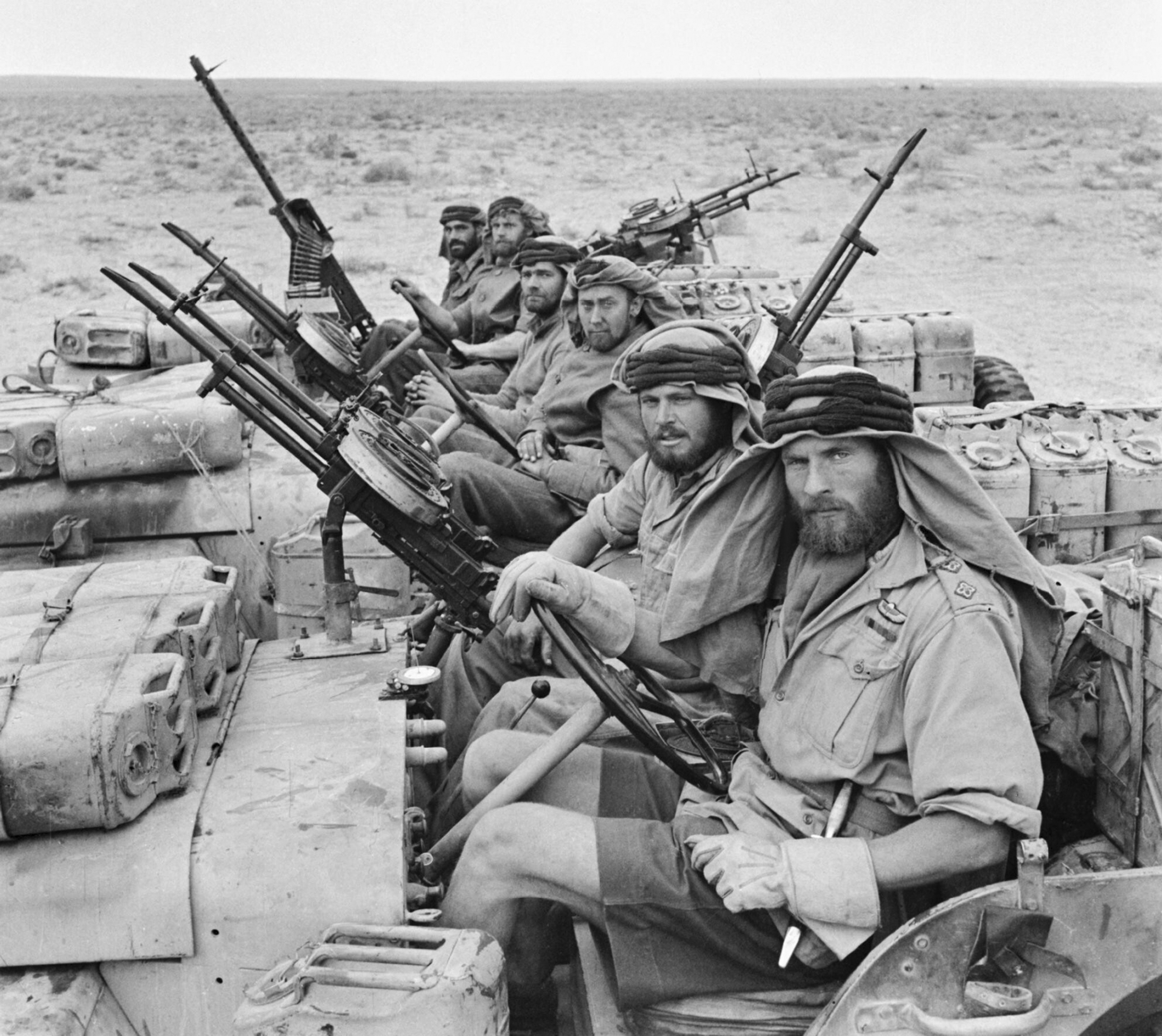
"L" Detachment SAS in armed jeeps during the North African campaign of World War II

Light improvised fighting vehicles date back to the first use of automobiles, and to the horse-drawn tachankas mounting machine guns in eastern Europe and Russia. At the Bombardment of Papeete in World War I, the French armed several Ford trucks with 37 mm guns to bolster their defense of the city. During the Spanish Civil War, field guns were fixed to trucks to act as improvised self-propelled guns, and improvised armored cars were constructed by attaching steel plates to trucks.

In World War II, various British and Commonwealth units, including the Long Range Desert Group (LRDG), the No. 1 Demolition Squadron or 'PPA' (Popski's Private Army), and the Special Air Service (SAS) were noted for their exploits in the deserts of Egypt, Libya and Chad using unarmored motor vehicles, often fitted with machine guns. Examples of LRDG vehicles include the Chevrolet WB 30 cwt Patrol Truck and the Willys MB Jeep.

U.S. Marines launching a TOW missile from a M151 ¼-ton 4×4 utility truck during a 1980s training exercise at the Marine Corps Air Ground Combat Center

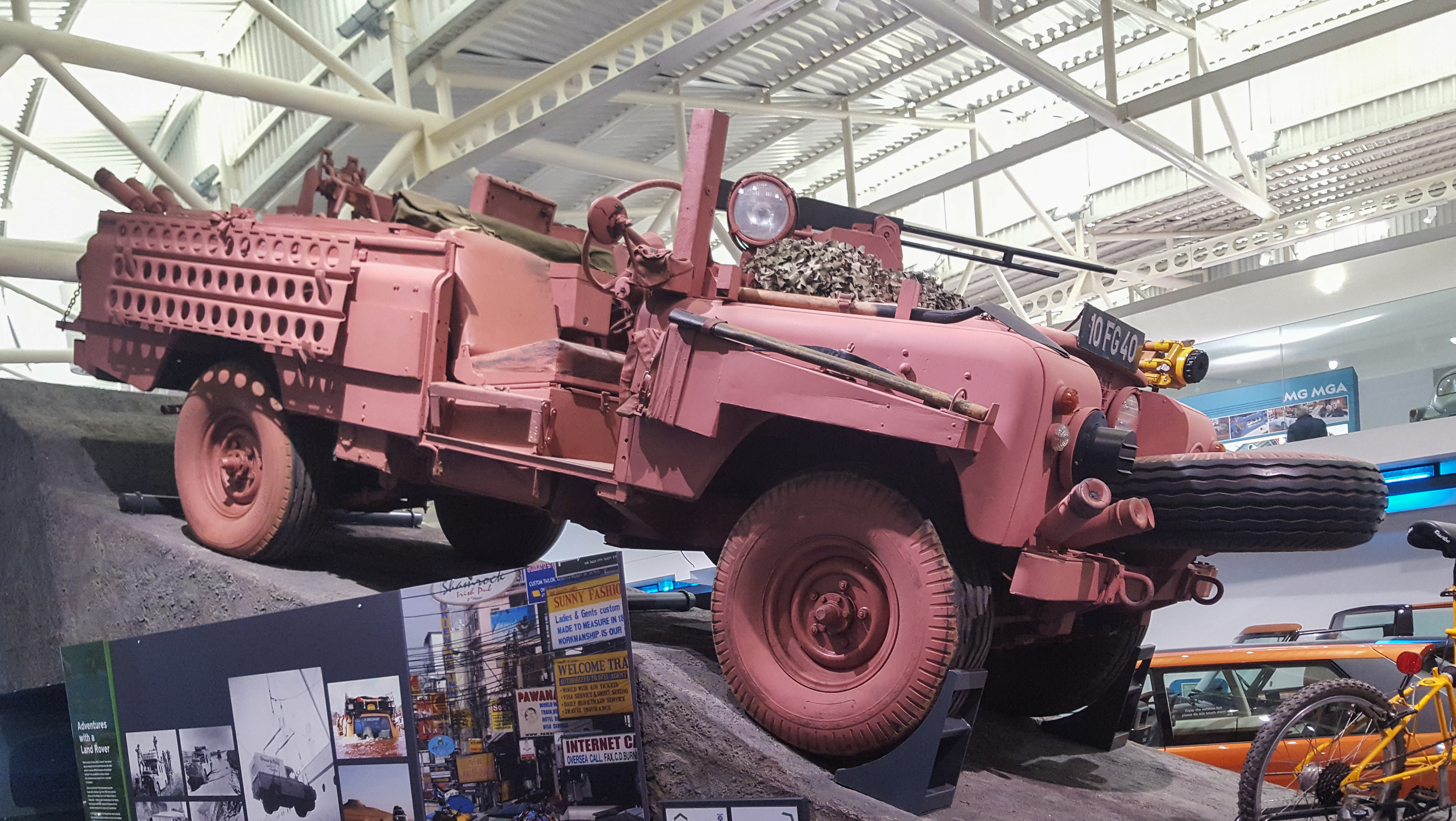
SAS Land Rover series IIa 'Pink Panther'

The SAS' use of heavily armed Land Rovers continued post-war, with their use of Series I Land Rovers and later Series IIA 1968 Land Rovers in the Dhofar Rebellion. The SAS painted their Land Rovers pink, as it was found to provide excellent camouflage in the desert and they were nicknamed 'Pink Panthers' or Pinkies. The SAS used a more modern Land Rover Desert Patrol Vehicle (DPV) during the Gulf War.

=== Western Sahara ===
Tactics for employing technicals were pioneered by the Sahrawi People's Liberation Army, the armed wing of the Polisario Front, fighting for independence against Mauritania (1975–79) and Morocco (1975–present) from headquarters in Tindouf, Algeria. Algeria provided arms and Land Rovers to Sahrawi guerrillas, who successfully used them in long-range desert raids against the less agile conventional armies of their opponents, recalling Sahrawi tribal raids (ghazis) of the pre-colonial period. Polisario later gained access to heavier equipment, but four-wheel drive vehicles remain a staple of their arsenal.

The Moroccan army quickly changed their strategy and created mounted units using technicals to challenge Polisario speed and hit and run strategies in the large desert, where the Moroccan units proved their efficiency.

=== Chadian–Libyan conflict ===
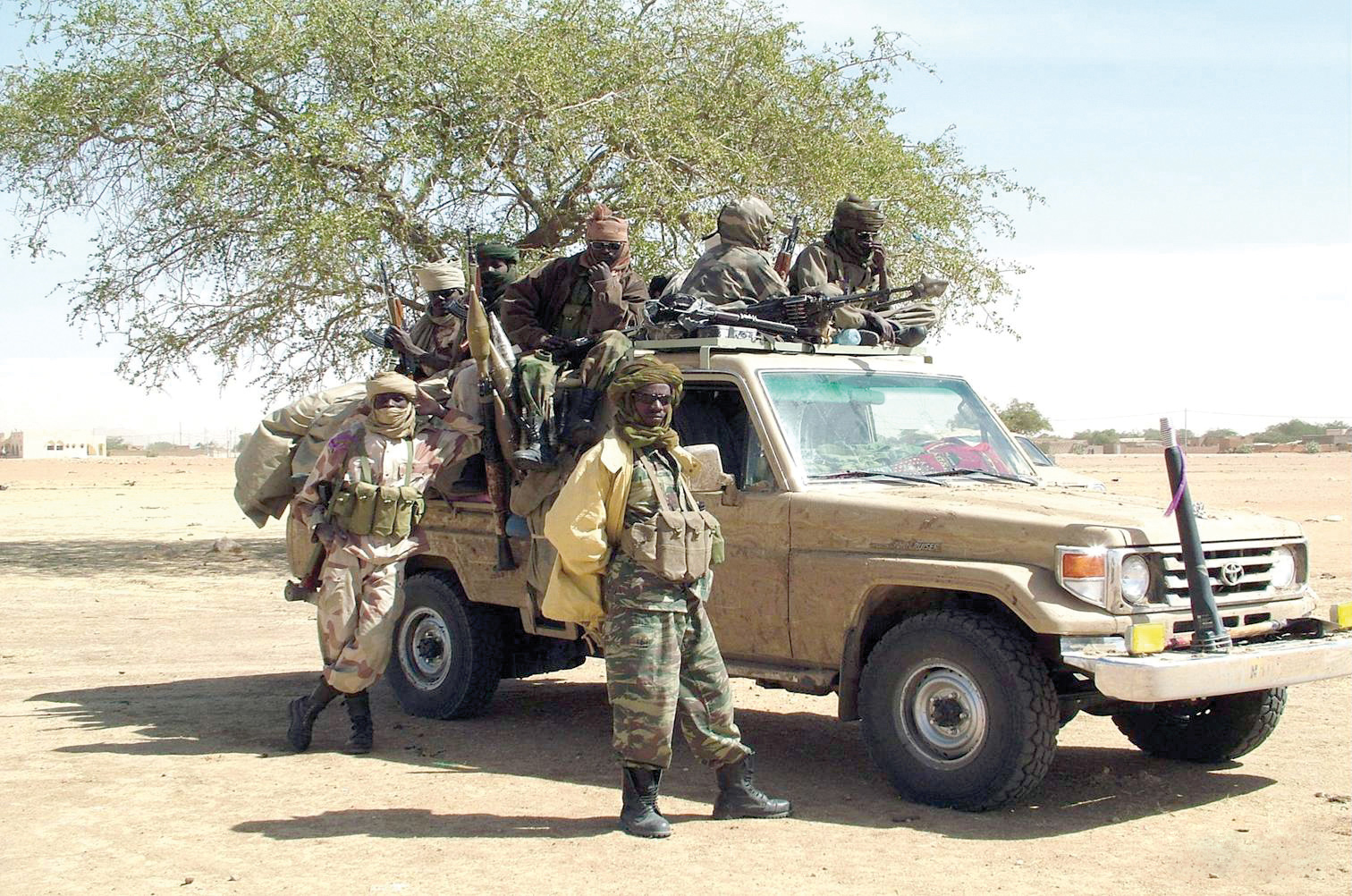
A Chadian Toyota Land Cruiser Pickup technical.

In 1987, Chadian troops equipped with technicals drove the heavily mechanized Libyan army from the Aozou Strip. The vehicles were instrumental in the victory at the Battle of Fada, and were driven over 150 km (93 mi) into Libya to raid military bases. It was discovered that these light vehicles could ride through anti-tank minefields without detonating the mines when driven at speeds over 100 km/h. The vehicles became so famous that, in 1984, Time dubbed early stages of the conflict the "Great Toyota War".

The Toyota War was unusual in that the force equipped with improvised vehicles prevailed over the force equipped with purpose-built fighting vehicles. MILAN anti-tank guided missiles provided by France were key to the Chadian success, while the Libyan forces were poorly deployed and organized.

=== The Troubles in Northern Ireland ===
Throughout the conflict in Northern Ireland (1960s-1998), the Provisional IRA fitted vehicles, especially vans and trucks, with automatic weapons, heavy machine guns, and improvised mortars. Sometimes the vehicles were armored with welded plates and sandbags. The IRA employed tractors and trailers to transport and fire improvised mortars, and heavy equipment to tear down fences and barbed wire and break into fortified security bases. Improvised flamethrowers were usually modified manure spreaders pulled to their targets by tractor.

=== Somali Civil War ===
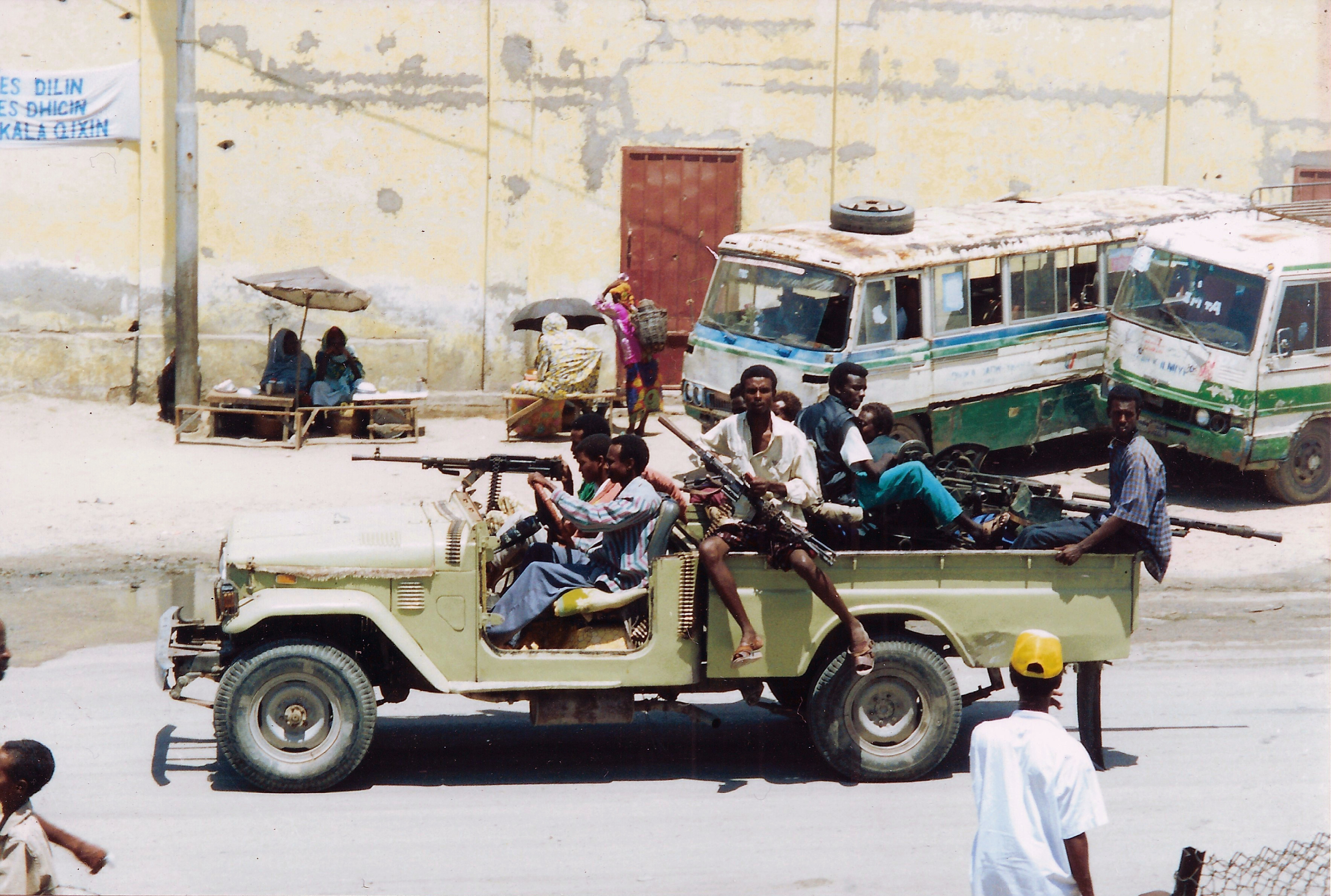
A Toyota Land Cruiser technical in Mogadishu at the time of the UNOSOM II mission

Technicals played an important role in the 1990s Somali Civil War and the War in Somalia (2006–2009). Even prior to the collapse of the Somali Democratic Republic, camouflaged Toyota pickup trucks with mounted M2 Browning machine guns appeared in Somali military parades in the 1980s. After the fall of the Siad Barre regime and the collapse of the Somali National Army (SNA), it was rare for any Somali force to field armored fighting vehicles. However, technicals were very common.

In September 1995, Somali faction leader Mohamed Farrah Aidid used 30 technicals and a force of 600 militia to capture Baidoa. It was reported that after his death in 1996, his body was carried to his funeral on a Toyota pickup.

In 2006, proving their susceptibility to heavy weapons and their value as a military prize, the Islamic Courts Union (ICU) captured 30 "battlewagons" during the defeat of warlord Abdi Qeybdid's militia in the Second Battle of Mogadishu. That September, an impressive array of 130 technicals was used to take Kismayo from the forces of the Juba Valley Alliance.

In November 2006, then President of Puntland, General Adde Musa, personally led fifty technicals to Galkacyo to confront the Islamists. They were used a month later against the army of the Islamic Courts Union at the Battle of Bandiradley alongside Abdi Qeybdiid's reconstituted militia.

Forced into conventional battles in the War in Somalia (2006–2009), the unarmored technicals of the ICU proved no match for the T-55 tanks, Mil Mi-24 helicopter gunships and fighter-bombers employed by Ethiopia.

=== War in Afghanistan ===
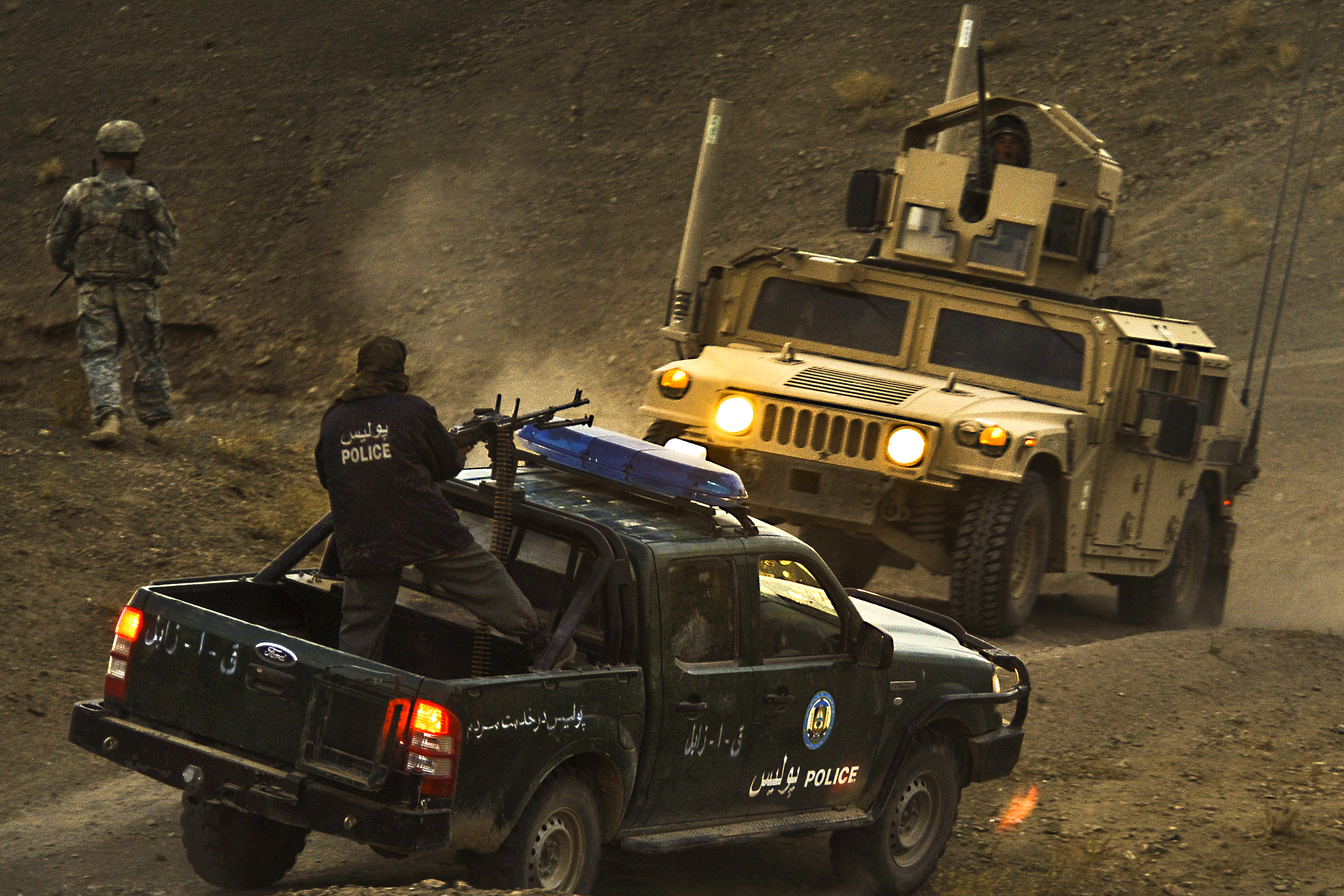
An Afghan National Police Ford technical with a U.S. Army Humvee during a patrol in Zabul Province, Afghanistan.

In the War in Afghanistan, U.S. special operations forces units such as the Green Berets were known to use technicals for patrol, because of the rugged terrain and the nature of their clandestine operations. The Taliban also use technicals in the bulk of their mobile fighting force.

=== Iraq War ===
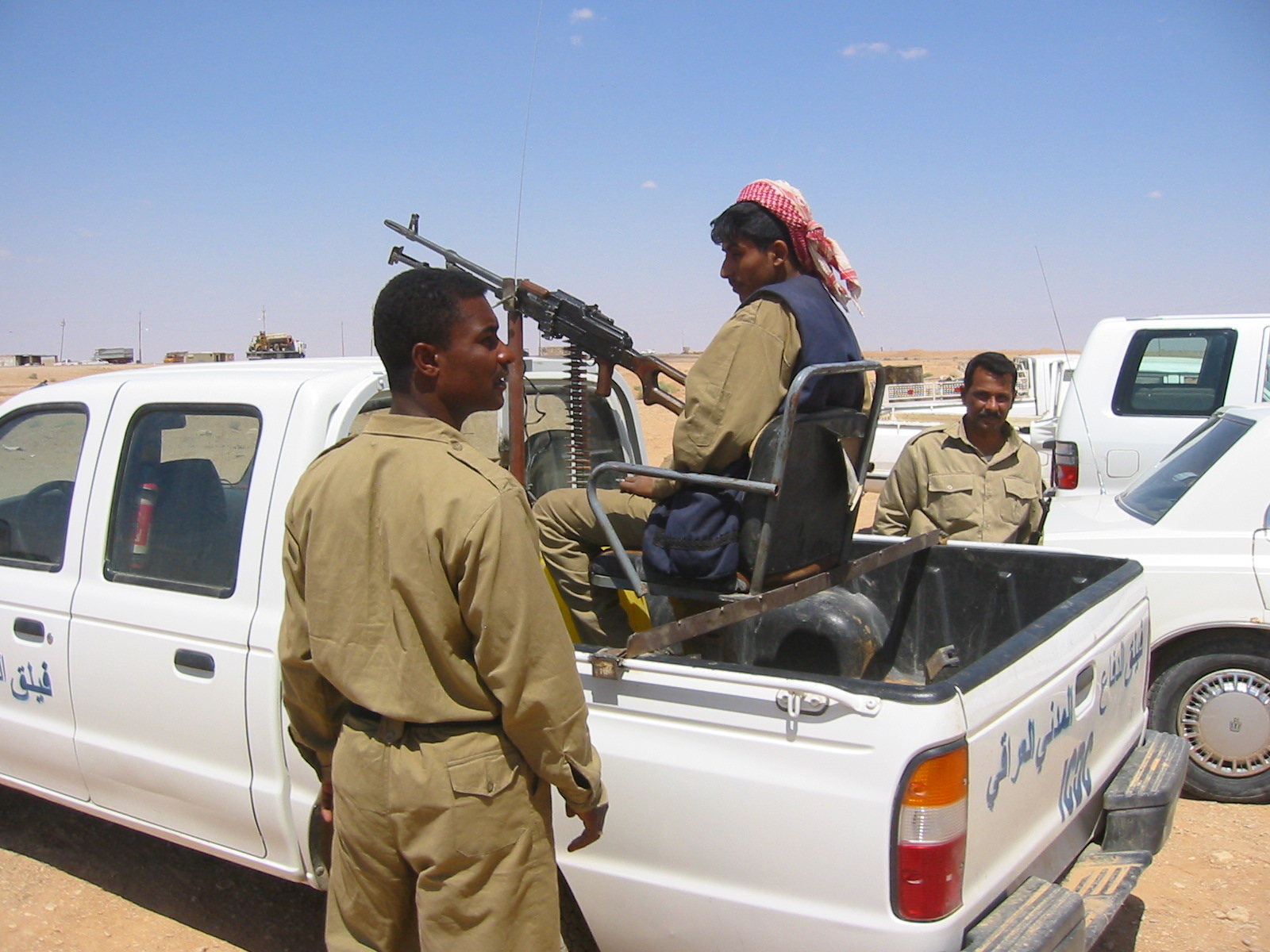
Iraqi National Guard troops with a PK machine gun mounted on a fourth generation Ford Courier

Technicals were used by Iraqi military forces in the 2003 invasion of Iraq. The Iraqi Republican Guard and Fedayeen emulated tactics of the Somali National Alliance with limited success, but were outmatched by Coalition armor and aviation. In the aftermath of the invasion, technicals were used by Iraqi insurgents for transporting personnel and quick raids against the Iraqi police forces. The insurgent use of technicals increased after the Iraq Spring Fighting of 2004.

Many military utility vehicles were modified to serve as gun trucks to protect Coalition convoys. The Humvee allows for weapon mounts by design, so it is not considered a technical.

The Coalition supplied technicals to the Iraqi police. Private military contractors used technicals and the United States military used modified Toyota Hiluxes, Land Cruisers, and other trucks as well.

=== Darfur conflict ===
Janjaweed militias use technicals on their raids against civilian villages in Darfur, Sudan, as do the Sudan Liberation Army (SLA) and Justice and Equality Movement (JEM) rebel troops in defense of their areas of operations. Light vehicles such as technicals are often thought to be more mobile than armored vehicles, but on one occasion an African peace-keeper driving a Grizzly AVGP whose guns had jammed, succeeded in catching up with, ramming and rolling over a fleeing Sudanese technical.

=== Lebanon ===
Introduced by the Palestine Liberation Organization (PLO) guerrilla groups, technicals were extensively employed by all factions involved in the Lebanese Civil War between 1975 and 1990, including the Christian Lebanese Front and the Lebanese National Movement (LNM) irregular militias, the Lebanese Army and the Internal Security Forces (ISF). Opposition forces used technicals in the fighting for the Chouf District during the May 2008 clashes in Lebanon.

=== Libyan Civil War ===
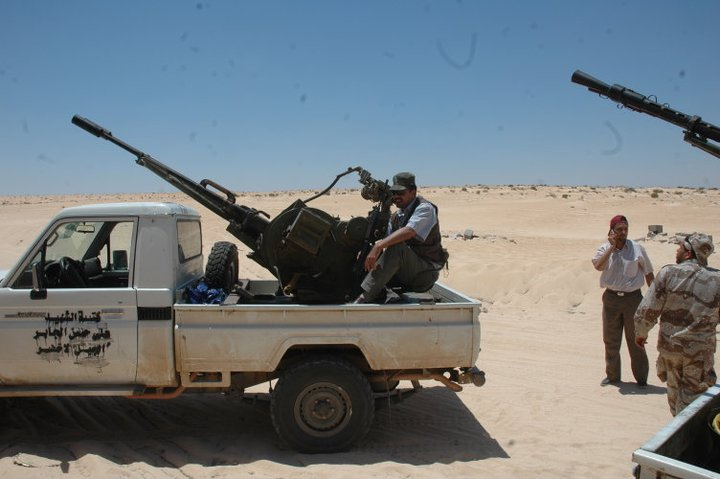
A Toyota Land Cruiser equipped with a ZU-23-2 anti-aircraft gun technical used by the forces of the National Transitional Council, October 2011

During the First Libyan Civil War, both regime loyalist forces as well as the anti-Gaddafi forces used technicals extensively. The type of warfare in the conflict—wherein highly mobile groups of soldiers and rebels continued to move to and from on the desert terrain, retreating at a time and then suddenly attacking to regain control of small towns and villages in the Eastern rebel held parts of Libya—led to the technical becoming a vehicle of choice for both sides.

Technicals were widely used by the rebels while setting up checkpoints. They formed a vast percentage of the rebel inventory, which was limited to light weapons, light body armor and very few tanks. Some medium flatbed trucks carried the Soviet-made ZPU and ZU-23-2 towed anti-aircraft twin or quad barreled guns, and recoilless rifles and S-5 rocket helicopter rocket launcher pods.

Some rebels improvised with captured heavy weaponry, like BMP-1 turrets and helicopter rocket pods, and lower-tech methods such as using doorbells to ignite rocket-launched ammunition. Rebel technicals frequently employed BM-21 Grad rockets. Rocket tubes were salvaged from damaged regime Ural-375D trucks and mounted on the backs of pickups, with the technicals able to fire anywhere from one to six rockets.

=== Syrian Civil War ===
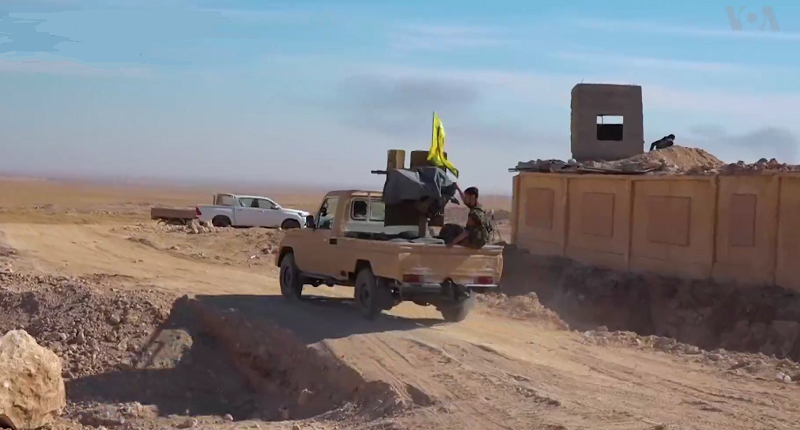
An SDF Toyota Land Cruiser technical in a village captured from ISIL near Raqqa, Syria

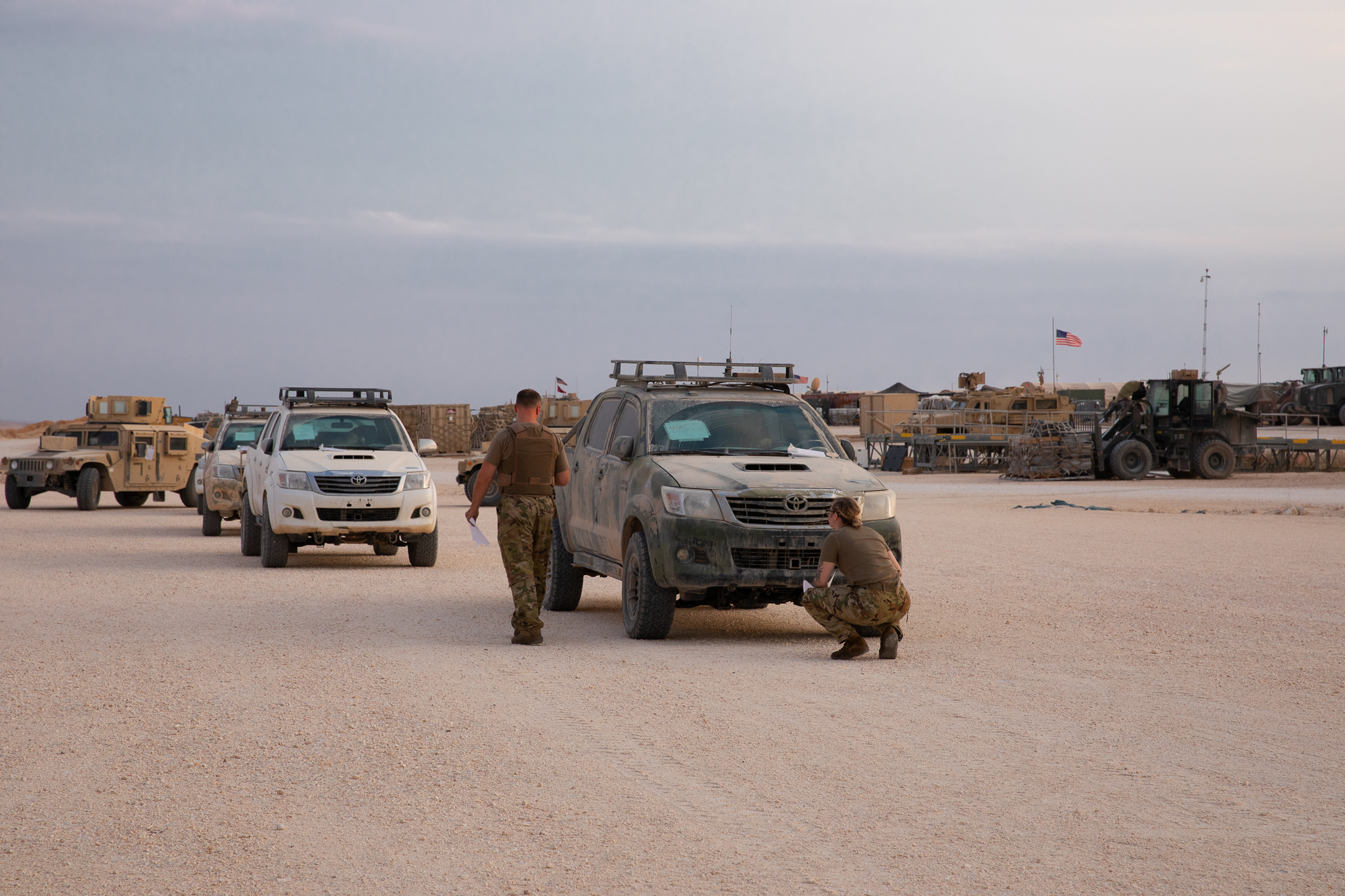
Toyota Hilux non-standard Tactical Vehicles (NSTVs) used by U.S. troops in Syria

In the Syrian Civil War, technicals are extensively used as improvised fighting vehicles, especially by former opposition forces such as Jaysh al-Thuwar, who largely lack conventional fighting vehicles. Syrian government forces used technicals, but on a smaller scale. The kind of weapons mounted on technicals varies widely, including machine guns, recoilless rifles, anti-aircraft autocannons (commonly ZPU and ZU-23-2) and even BMP-1 turrets. The Military of ISIL extensively used technicals in Iraq and Syria.

Peshmerga forces have used technicals to surround and attack ISIS targets.

=== Russo-Ukrainian War ===
==== War in Donbas ====
During the 2014 war in Donbas, both sides were using home-made military vehicles. OSCE monitors recorded 15 Russian armored utility vehicles (UAZ-23632-148 Esaul) in a training area near non-government-controlled Oleksandrivska in April 2021.

==== Russian invasion of Ukraine ====
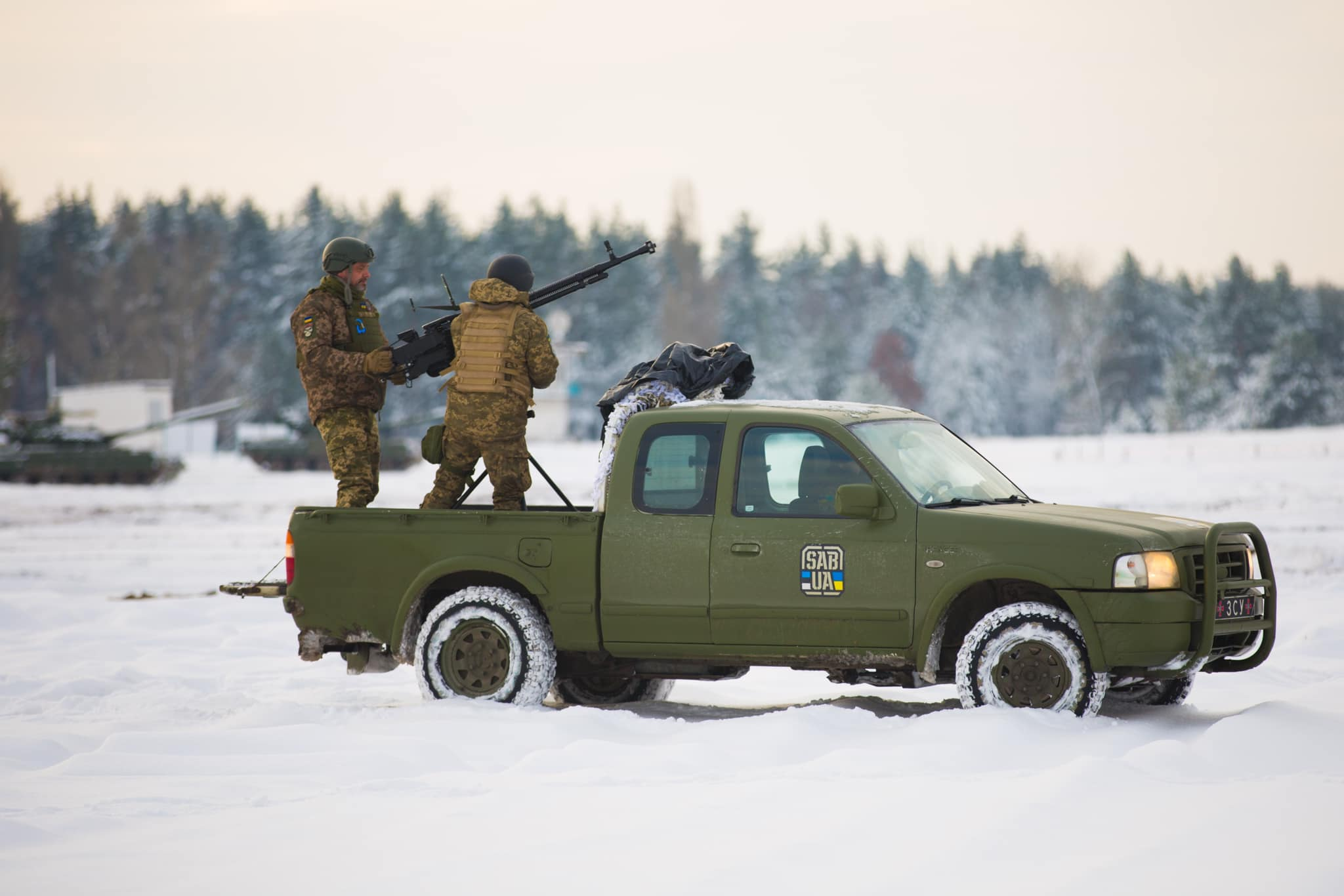
Ukrainian Territorial Defense Forces soldiers using a Ford Ranger technical with a DShK in an anti-aircraft role during the Russian invasion of Ukraine.

Technicals were seen being used by Spetsnaz in Gomel, Belarus in February 2022. Ukrainian forces used rocket launchers recovered from downed helicopters, mounted on technicals.

=== Yemeni Civil War ===
In the Yemeni Civil War, The Houthis, the internationally-recognized Yemeni government and the Southern separatists use technicals.

== Composition ==
Technicals consist of weapons mounted on a civilian vehicle, such as a four-wheel drive pickup truck. Many pickups have been used as technicals including Ford Ranger and Mitsubishi Triton, but the most favoured are the Toyota Hilux and Toyota Land Cruiser. They are typically fitted with heavy machine guns (especially the DShK, Type 77 or M2 Browning), anti-aircraft artillery (usually the ZPU or ZU-23-2), recoilless rifles (usually the SPG-9 or M40 recoilless rifle), anti-tank missiles launchers, multiple rocket launchers such as the Type 63 or the M-63 Plamen and in rare occasions rocket pods salvaged from downed attack helicopters like the S-5 rocket.

Due to being soft-skinned vehicles, optional add-on hardware include ballistic glass, turret gun shields and improvised vehicle armor made of welded steel plates, as defence against small arms fire to increase survival chances.

Some technicals have their original tyres changed to off-road tyres, run-flat tyres or specialised tyres with central tyre inflation system. The modified tyres improve technicals' performance on different terrains. Run-flat tyres, or central tyre inflation system equipped tyres give the technicals opportunity to quickly get out of dangerous situations, even when tyres are damaged.

== See also ==
- Armadillo armored fighting vehicle
- Boghammar
- Chariot – ancient equivalent
- Hit-and-run tactics
- Mini-Grad
- Narco tank
- Portee
- Tachanka
- Zamburak – Late medieval equivalent
