= Firos =

Firo or FIRO and Firos or FIROS may refer to:

== People ==
- Firos (politician), Youth Leader & General Secretary of Muslim Youth League in India
- Firo, one of the protagonists in the video game Firo & Klawd
- Firos Shah (also Firuz Shah Tughlaq; 1309–1388), sultan of Delhi
- Georgios Firos (also Giorgos Foiros, born 1953), Greek footballer

== Other uses ==
- Firo (cryptocurrency), a cryptocurrency
- Firo (Niger), a village in the Tongo Tongo, Niger
- Firos (artillery), FIROS, an Italian truck-mounted, field rocket system
- Fundamental interpersonal relations orientation, a theory of interpersonal relations
