= Mini-Grad =

Ukrainian improvised multiple rocket launcher

The Mini-Grad (Ukrainian: Міні-Град) is a Ukrainian improvised mobile multiple rocket launcher constructed from BM-21 Grad launch tubes mounted on a pickup truck. They have a number of extra features to improve survivability and accuracy at short ranges.

Ukrainian forces are known to have been using them against Russian forces since November 2023 during fighting in the Zaporizhzhia region amongst other places.

== See also ==
- Technical (vehicle)
