= Firos (artillery) =

Italian multiple rocket launcher system

The Firos (FIROS) is an Italian multiple rocket launcher system developed during the Cold War. The system consisted of forty 122 mm long-range rockets mounted on an armoured 6×6 truck (lorry) for mobility.

The first version developed was the Firos-25, 48 of which were exported to the United Arab Emirates in the 1980s. The more powerful Firos-30, with a range of over 30 km, was built in the late 1980s, and a single experimental battery entered service with the Italian Army in 1987. There were plans to buy about 60 launchers in the 1990s as a light complement for the costly M270 Multiple Launch Rocket System, but the program was terminated and the Army retained only the M270 as its sole rocket artillery system.

The Firos is similar to the Russian BM-21 Grad in that they both use 122 mm rockets in groups of forty, although they differ considerably in command and control systems and their base vehicles. Firos rockets are compatible with BM-21 launchers and may have been sold to some customers like Syria. About 160 systems were built, including sixteen FIROS 6 systems with 51 mm rockets.
