= BM-21 Grad =

Soviet/Russian multiple launch rocket system

BM-21 "Grad"
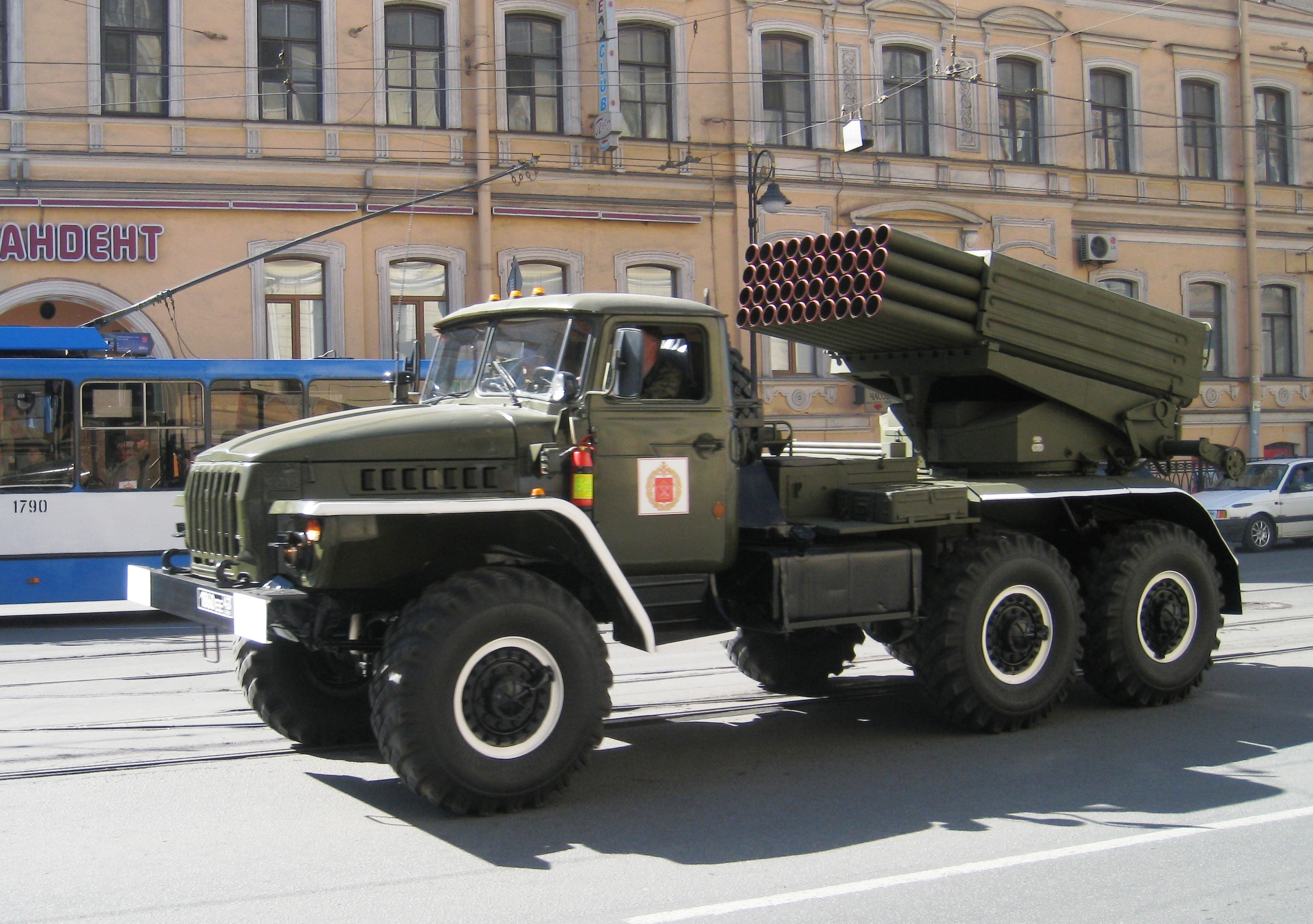
- A Russian BM-21-1 on display in Saint Petersburg in May 2009
- Type: Multiple rocket launcher
- Place of origin: Soviet Union

Service history
- In service: 1963–present
- Used by: See operators
- Wars: Sino-Soviet border conflict; Vietnam War; Lebanese Civil War; Western Sahara War; Eritrean War of Independence; Angolan Civil War; Ogaden War; South African Border War; Uganda–Tanzania War; Cambodian–Vietnamese War; Sino-Vietnamese War; Iran–Iraq War; Soviet–Afghan War; Afghan Civil War (1989–1992); Second Sudanese Civil War; Gulf War; First Nagorno-Karabakh War; Yugoslav Wars; War in Abkhazia (1992–1993); First Chechen War; 1995 Cenepa War; Kargil War; Second Chechen War; Palestinian rocket attacks on Israel; Ethiopian invasion of Somalia; Russo-Georgian War; Cambodian–Thai border dispute; Gaza War (2008-2009); 2012 Gaza War; Bombardment of Yeonpyeong; First Libyan Civil War; Syrian civil war; Northern Mali conflict; War in Donbas; Saudi Arabian-led intervention in Yemen; Second Nagorno-Karabakh War; Tigray War; Russo-Ukrainian war; 2023 Las Anod conflict; Gaza war; Kivu conflict; 2025 Cambodia‒Thailand conflict

Production history
- Designer: Splav State Research and Production Enterprise
- Designed: 1963
- Manufacturer: Splav State Research and Production Enterprise
- Produced: 1963–present
- No. built: 100,000 +
- Variants: See Variants

Specifications (9K51)
- Mass: 13.71 tonnes (30,225 lb)
- Length: 7,350 mm (24 ft 1 in)
- Barrel length: 3,000 mm (9 ft 10 in)
- Width: 2,400 mm (7 ft 10 in)
- Height: 3,090 mm (10 ft 2 in)
- Crew: 3
- Caliber: 122 mm
- Barrels: 40
- Rate of fire: 2 rounds/s
- Muzzle velocity: 690 m/s (2,264 ft/s)
- Effective firing range: 0.5–52 km
- Sights: PG-1M panoramic telescope
- Engine: V8 gasoline ZiL-375; 180 hp (130 kW)
- Suspension: 6×6 wheeled
- Operational range: 405 km (251 mi)
- Maximum speed: 75 km/h (47 mph)

The BM-21 "Grad" (Russian: БМ-21 "Град", lit. 'hailstorm') is a self-propelled 122 mm multiple rocket launcher designed in the Soviet Union. The system and the M-21OF rocket were first developed in the early 1960s, and saw their first combat use in March 1969 during the Sino-Soviet border conflict. BM stands for boyevaya mashina (Russian: боевая машина – combat vehicle), and the nickname grad means "hail". The complete system with the BM-21 launch vehicle and M-21OF rocket is designated as the M-21 field-rocket system and is more commonly known as a Grad multiple rocket launcher system.

In NATO countries, the system, either the complete system or just the launch vehicle, was initially known as the M1964. Several other countries have copied the Grad or developed similar systems. In Russian service, its intended replacement is the 9A52-4 Tornado. Many similar 122 mm MLRS systems are made by different countries based on the BM-21 Grad.

== Description ==
The M-21 field rocket system with a BM-21 launch vehicle (122 mm multiple rocket launcher (MRL) system) entered service with the Soviet Army in 1963 to replace the aging 140 mm BM-14 system. The launch vehicle consists of a Ural-375D 6x6 truck chassis fitted with a bank of 40 launch tubes arranged in a rectangular shape that can be turned away from the unprotected cab.

The vehicle is powered by a water-cooled V8 180 hp gasoline engine, has a maximum road speed of 75 km/h (47 mph), a road range of up to 750 kilometers (470 mi), and can cross fords up to 1.5 m (4 ft 11 in) deep. The original vehicle together with supporting equipment (including the resupply truck 9T254 with 60 rockets) is referred to by the GRAU index "9K51". The launcher itself has the industrial index of "2B5". In 1976, the BM-21 was mounted on the newer Ural-4320 6x6 army truck.

The three-member crew can emplace the system and have it ready to fire in three minutes. The crew can fire the rockets from the cab or from a trigger at the end of a 64-meter (210 ft) cable. All 40 rockets can be away in as little as 20 seconds, and can be fired individually or in small groups in several-second intervals. A PG-1M panoramic telescope with a K-1 collimator can be used for sighting.

Each 2,870-millimeter (9 ft 5 in) rocket is slowly spun by rifling in its tube as it exits that, along with its primary fin stabilization, keeps it on course. Rockets armed with high explosive-fragmentation, incendiary, or chemical warheads can be fired 20 kilometers (12 mi). Newer high explosive and cargo rockets (used to deliver anti-personnel or antitank mines) have a range of 30 kilometers (19 mi) and more. Warheads weigh around 20 kilograms (44 lb), depending on the type.

The number of rockets that each vehicle is able to quickly bring to bear on an enemy target makes it effective, especially at shorter ranges. One battalion of eighteen launchers is able to deliver 720 rockets in a single volley. The system has lower precision than gun artillery and cannot be used in situations that call for pinpoint accuracy. It relies on a large number of shells impacting over an area for a certain hit rate on specific targets. Because of the short warning time for the impact of the whole volley, the BM-21 is still considered an effective weapon.

== Operational history ==
The Grad saw its first combat use in March 1969 during the Sino-Soviet border conflict.

Their use, in conjunction with the M-46, during Operation Savannah halted the advance of South African troops in 1975. The Valkiri was brought into service in 1977 to counter the Grad.

== Variants ==
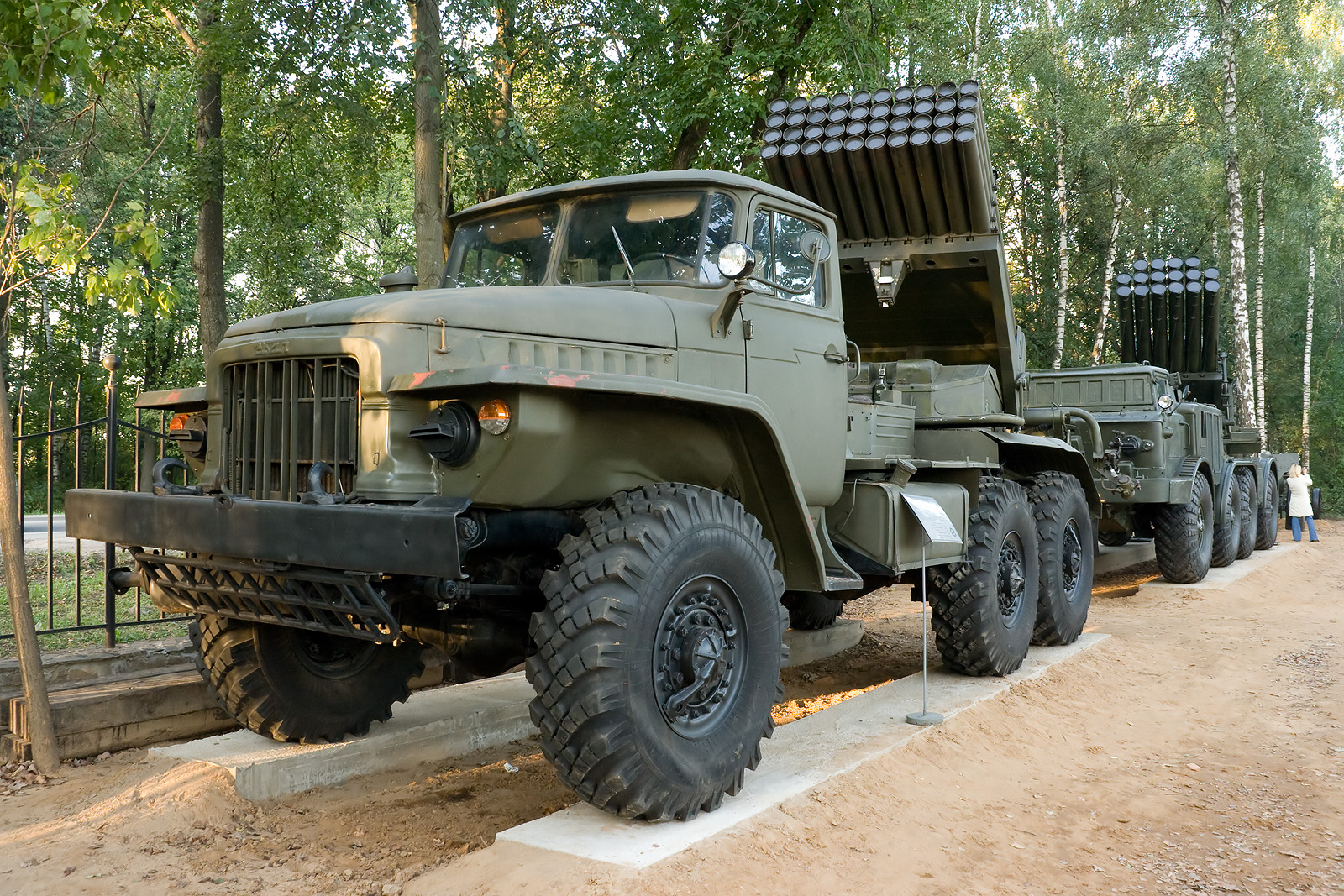
A BM-21 launch vehicle.

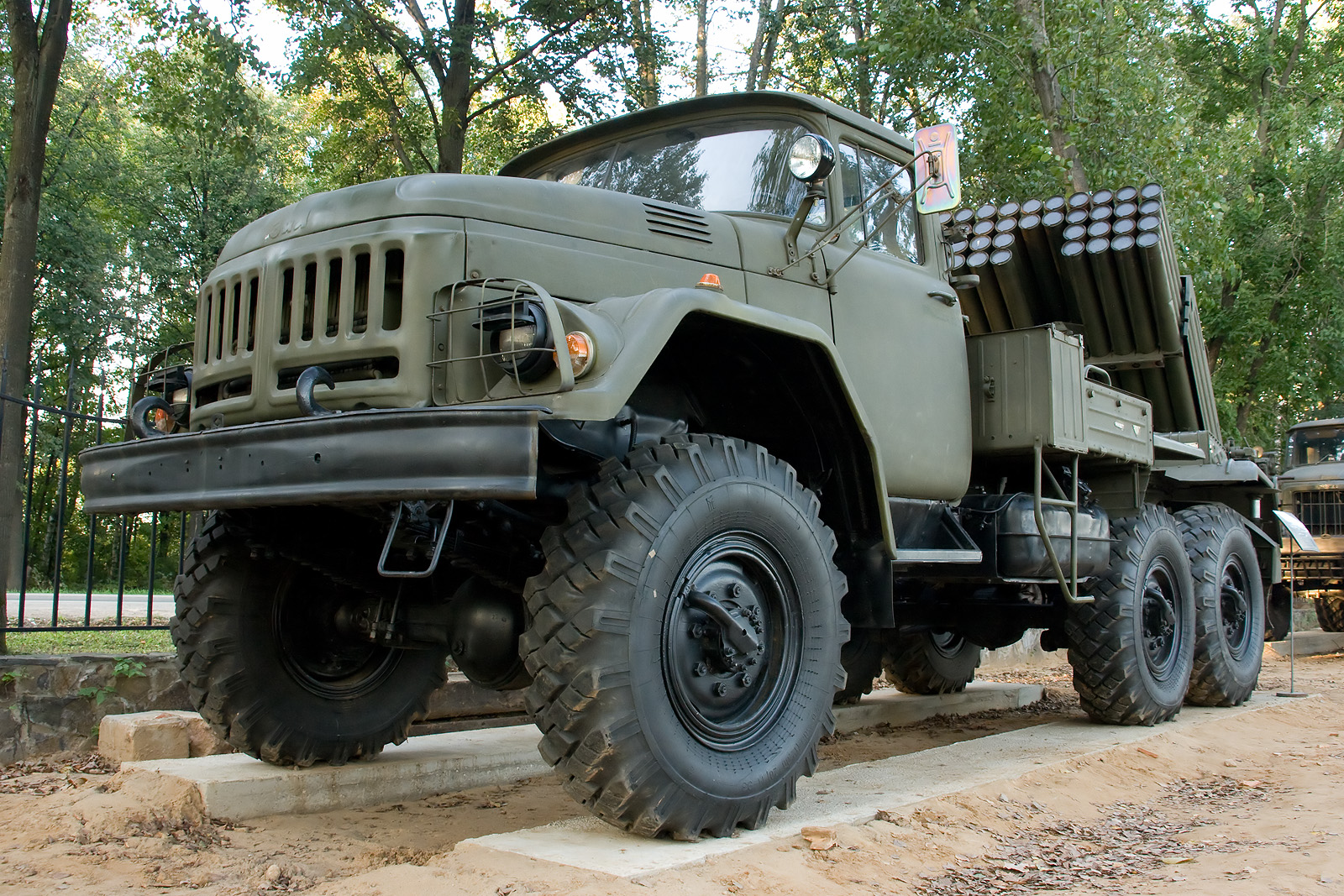
The 9P138 launch vehicle of the Grad-1 multiple rocket launcher system.

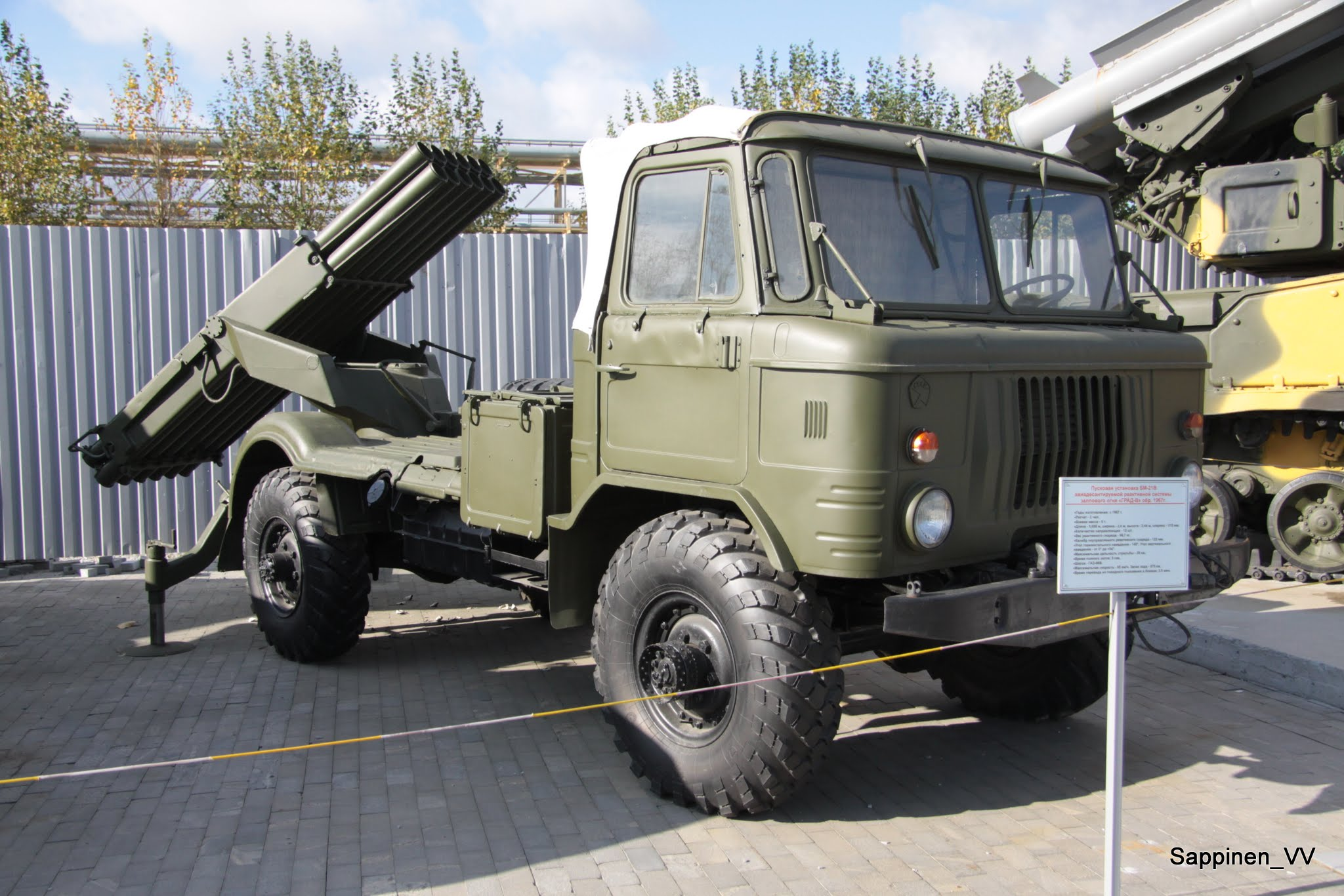
A BM-21V VDV variant.

=== Soviet Union/Russia ===
- BM-21: Original version known as the BM-21 launch vehicle. The launcher unit was mounted on a modified Ural-375D truck chassis.
  - BM-21-1: Launch vehicles are mounted on a family of Ural-4320 truck chassis.
  - 2B17 or also BM-21-1: This upgrade was presented for the first time in 2003 and was developed by Motovilikha Plants from Perm. The system is fitted with a satellite navigation system NAP SNS, automated fire control system ASUNO, APP laying system and can fire a new generation of rockets with a range of 40 km (25 mi). The truck is the Ural-43201.

- 9P138 "Grad-1": lighter 36-round version, mounted on a 6x6 ZIL-131 chassis. The vehicle with supporting equipment (rockets, transporter 9T450 and resupply truck 9F380) is referred to as complex 9K55. The 9P138 can only use "short-range" rockets with a range of 15 km (9.3 mi). It used to be known in the West as BM-21b or M1976.

- BM-21V "Grad-V" (Vozdushnodesantniy – 'airborne') (NATO designation M1975): Developed for Soviet Airborne Forces in 1969. A GAZ-66B 4x4 truck chassis is fitted with a 12-round 122 mm rocket launcher. The vehicle is sturdy enough to be airdropped. Parts of the vehicle such as the canvas cab roof can be taken off or folded down to reduce its size during transit. Like the BM-21, the BM-21V has stabilizing jacks on the rear of the vehicle for support when firing. The launch vehicle has the industrial index of 9P125.

- 9А51 "Prima": 50-round launcher on a Ural-4320 5t chassis. The vehicle together with fire control equipment, the ammunition transporter TZM 9T232M and the new rocket 9M53F is referred to as complex 9K59. Apparently only a small number was produced.

- "Grad-P Light portable rocket system": The complete system comprises a 9P132 single-round man-portable launcher (it can be reloaded and used again), a 9M22M 122 mm high-explosive fragmentation rocket and a fire control panel. The system was developed in the middle of the 1960s for Soviet special units and was used by Vietnamese forces at war with the US, under the designation DKZ-B. It was not accepted for regular service with the Russian Army, but it was and is still popular with paramilitary and guerrilla forces. This version was occasionally employed by both sides in the Donbas War (2014–2022).

- BM-21PD "Damba" (Protivodiversionnyi): 40-round launcher mounted on Ural-375D or 43201 truck chassis. Developed for protection of naval bases against underwater infiltrations, uses special ammunition PRS-60 (Protivodiversionnyi Reaktivnyi Snaryad). The vehicle together with ammunition transporter is referred to as complex DP-62 "Damba".

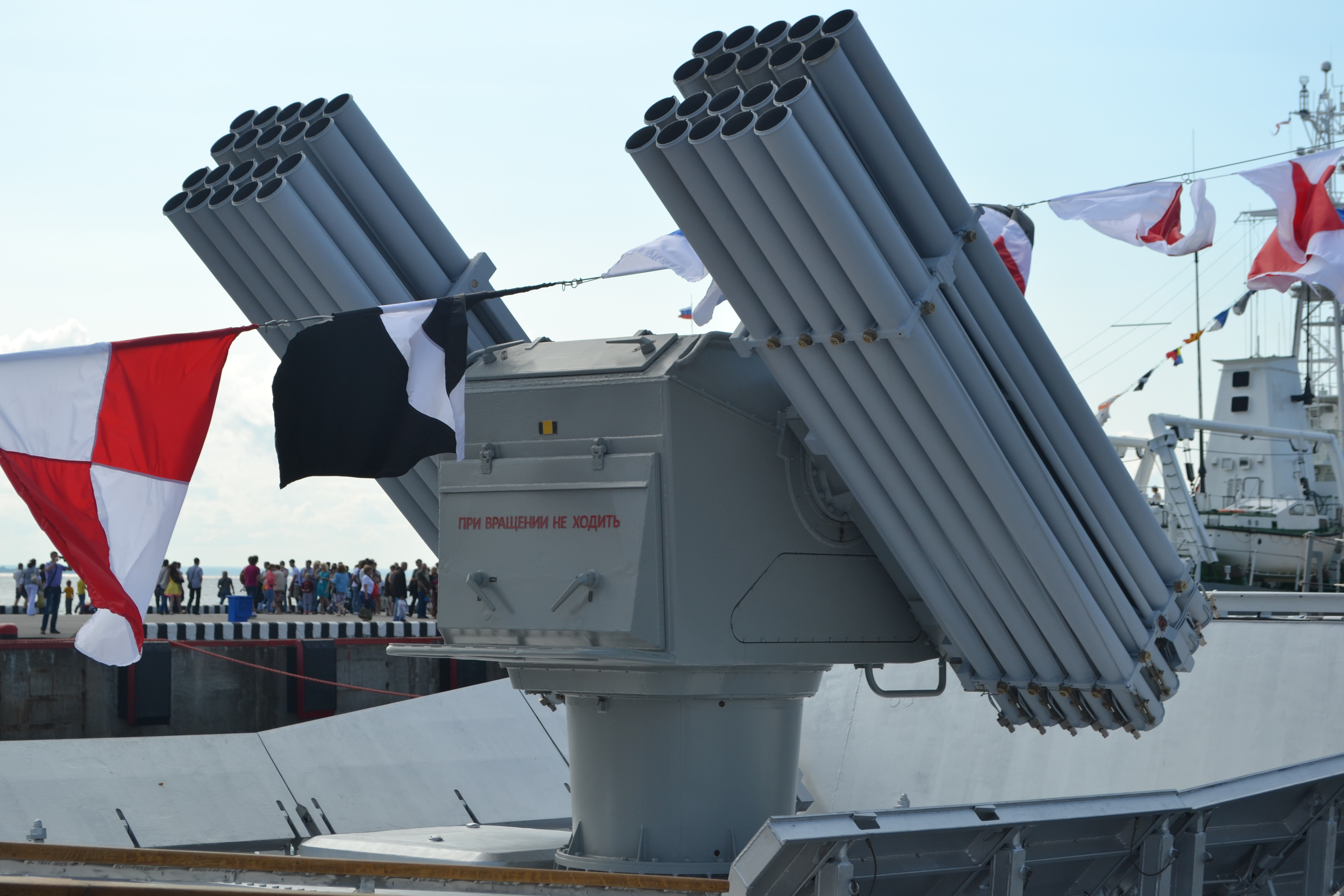
- A-215 Grad-M
  A-215 "Grad-M": 20-round naval version, entered service in 1978. Developed from 1966-1969, sea trials held 1972. Used on Tapir-class landing ship, Ivan Rogov-class landing ship, and Buyan-class corvette. The "Grad-M" is designed to engage enemy personnel and equipment ashore during amphibious landings, support Marine Corps operations, and defend landing ships against attacks by enemy vessels. Its rate of fire and firing range provide the necessary support to the Marines in carrying out their assigned landing missions.

Adaptations of the launcher were/are produced by several countries including China, Czechoslovakia, Egypt, Iran, North Korea, Poland and Romania.

=== Belarus ===
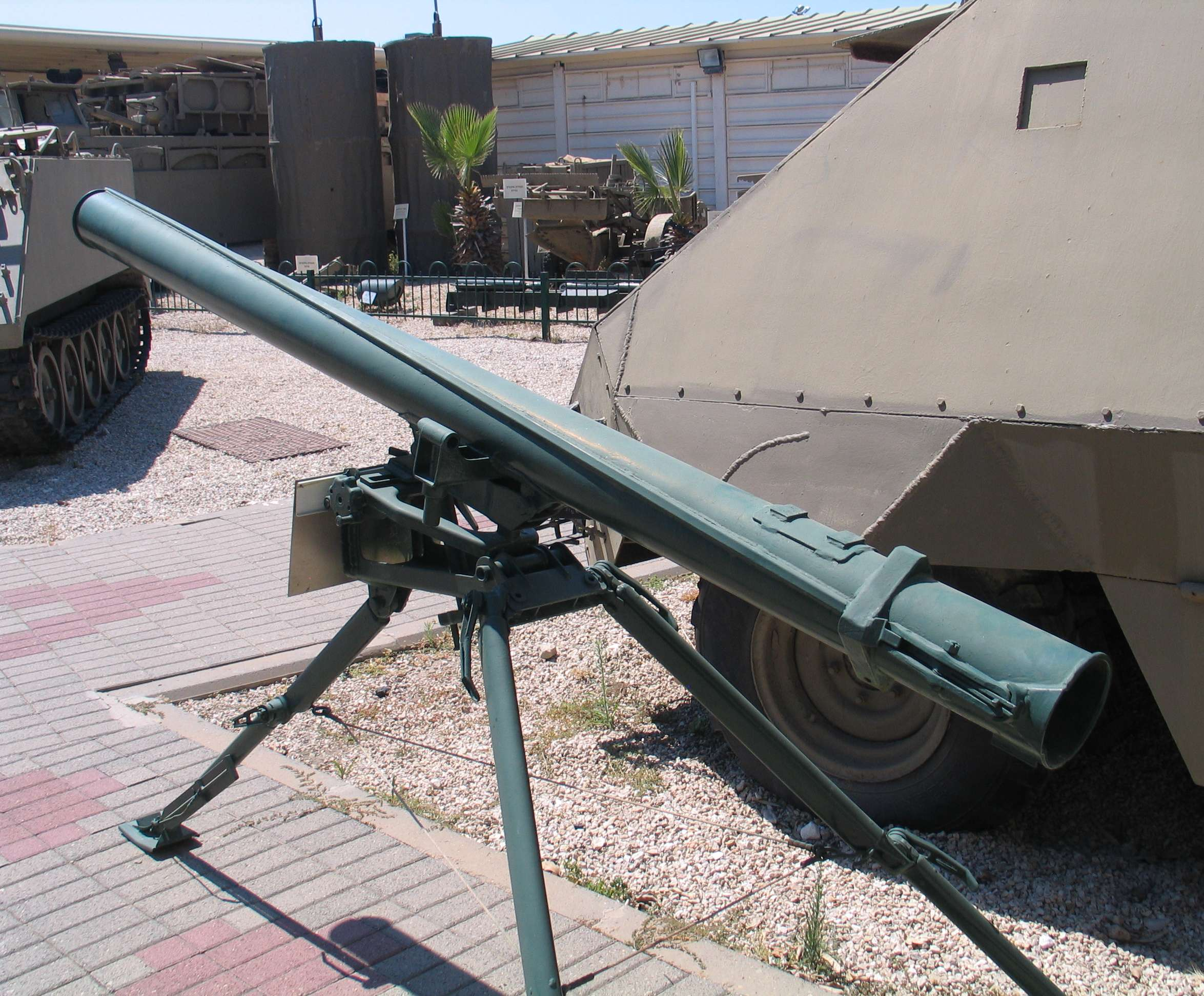
A Grad-P single tube launcher system

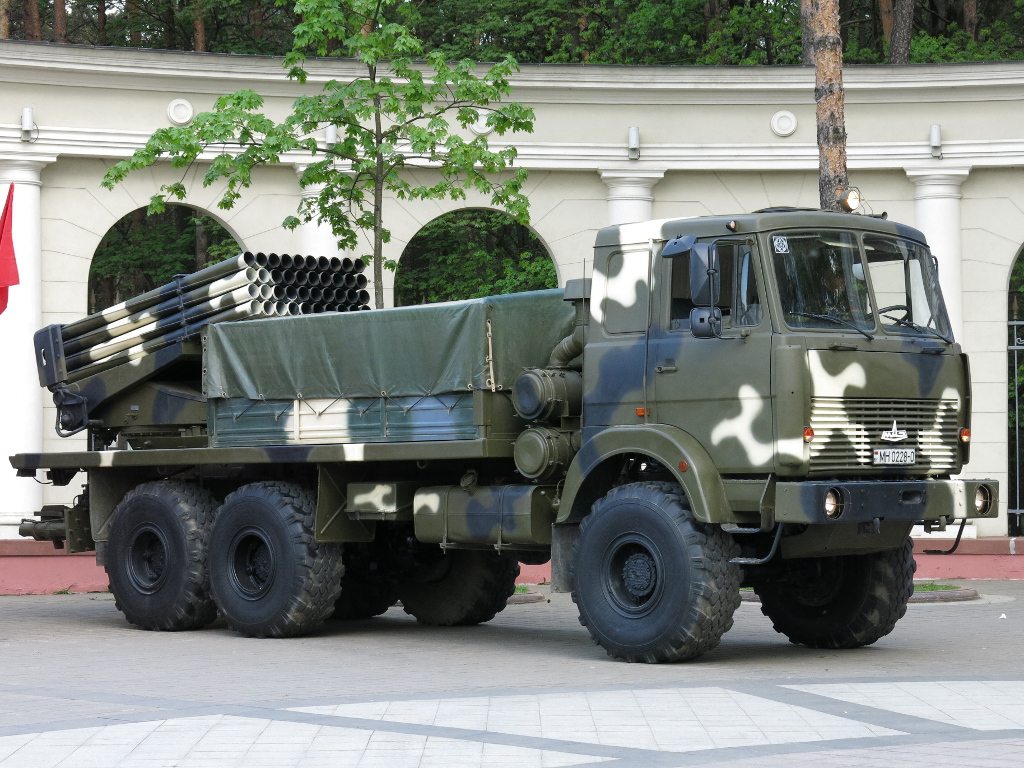
A Belarusian BM-21A "BelGrad"

- BM-21A "BelGrad": This is a modernized version, based on a MAZ-631705 6×6 truck with 425 hp diesel engine TMZ-8424. Between the cab and the launcher there is another pack of 40 rockets. The system was evaluated from 1997 and entered service in 2001.

=== China ===
- Type 81 SPRL: The People's Republic of China produces the Type 81, its 122 mm rocket and launch tube was likely copied from Russian Grad-P projectiles and launchers that were captured in the 1979 Sino-Vietnamese War. It entered service with the PLA in 1982 where its upgraded version nowadays known as PHZ81. Due to the fact that it is a direct copy, the Type 81 is extremely similar to its Russian predecessor. Its 40 tubes are mounted on a Shaanxi Automobile Works Yan'an SX2150 6x6 truck, which unlike the original Russian version, has a cab protected by blast shields.
- Type 83 SPRL: This is a 24-round version, based on a Dong Feng truck. The launch tubes are arranged in three rows of 8. The launch vehicle has a total combat weight of 8,700 kilograms (19,200 lb) and can also be used as part of the mine-laying rocket system Type 84. Currently, new rockets with ranges between 30 and 40 km (19 and 25 mi) are being developed.
- Type 89 TSPRL: This is basically the 40-round launcher of the BM-21 or Type 81 mounted on a tracked chassis with 520 hp diesel engine. The same chassis is also used for the Type 83 152 mm self-propelled howitzer (PLZ83), the Type 89 120 mm tank destroyer (PTZ89) and several other specialised vehicles. The vehicle has a combat weight of 29.9 short tons (27.1 metric tons) and carries 40 spare rockets. Its current PLA designator is PHZ89.
- Type 90 SPRL: The NORINCO (China North Industries Corporation) Type 90 40-round multiple rocket system is an indigenously designed and built system equipped with an automatic operating and laying system, an electric firing system and an automatically reloadable pack of 40 rockets. It is very similar to the M-77 Oganj but of 122 mm calibre. The chassis used is the Tiema SC2030 6×6 truck. A Type 90 MRL battalion consists of three batteries, each with 6 self-propelled rocket launchers, 6 ammunition resupply trucks Tiema XC2200 with 80 rockets and a battery command post on a DongFeng EQ-245 6×6 truck.
- Type 90A: Modernised version, based on a Tiema XC2200 6×6 truck chassis and fitted with a modern fire control system with GPS. The command post vehicle can lay and control a number of Type 90A systems by remote control for maximum firepower.
- Type 90B: Latest, digitalised version. The rocket launch vehicle is based on a Beifang Benchi 2629 series 6×6 truck (Mercedes-Benz copy) and has a longer cabin. Each set now also has three forward observer vehicles, based on the armoured WZ551.
- PR50 SPMRL: Development of Type 90B SPMRL with firepower increased by 25% (50 rounds compared to the original 40 rounds). Incorporate features of Weishi series self-propelled multiple rocket launchers (WS SPMRL) series so that the operating cost and overall life cycle cost for both when most components of PR50 is interchangeable with that of WS series. Also incorporated is a feature originated in Type 90B, which is the adoption of rockets of different ranges, so PR50 has a wide range of 20 km to 40 km.
- WS-6 SPMRL: A lightweight and more compact derivative of unguided 122 mm PR50 SPMRL for rapid deployment, with number of tubes reduced by 60% to 40 * from the original 100 of PR50 MLS.

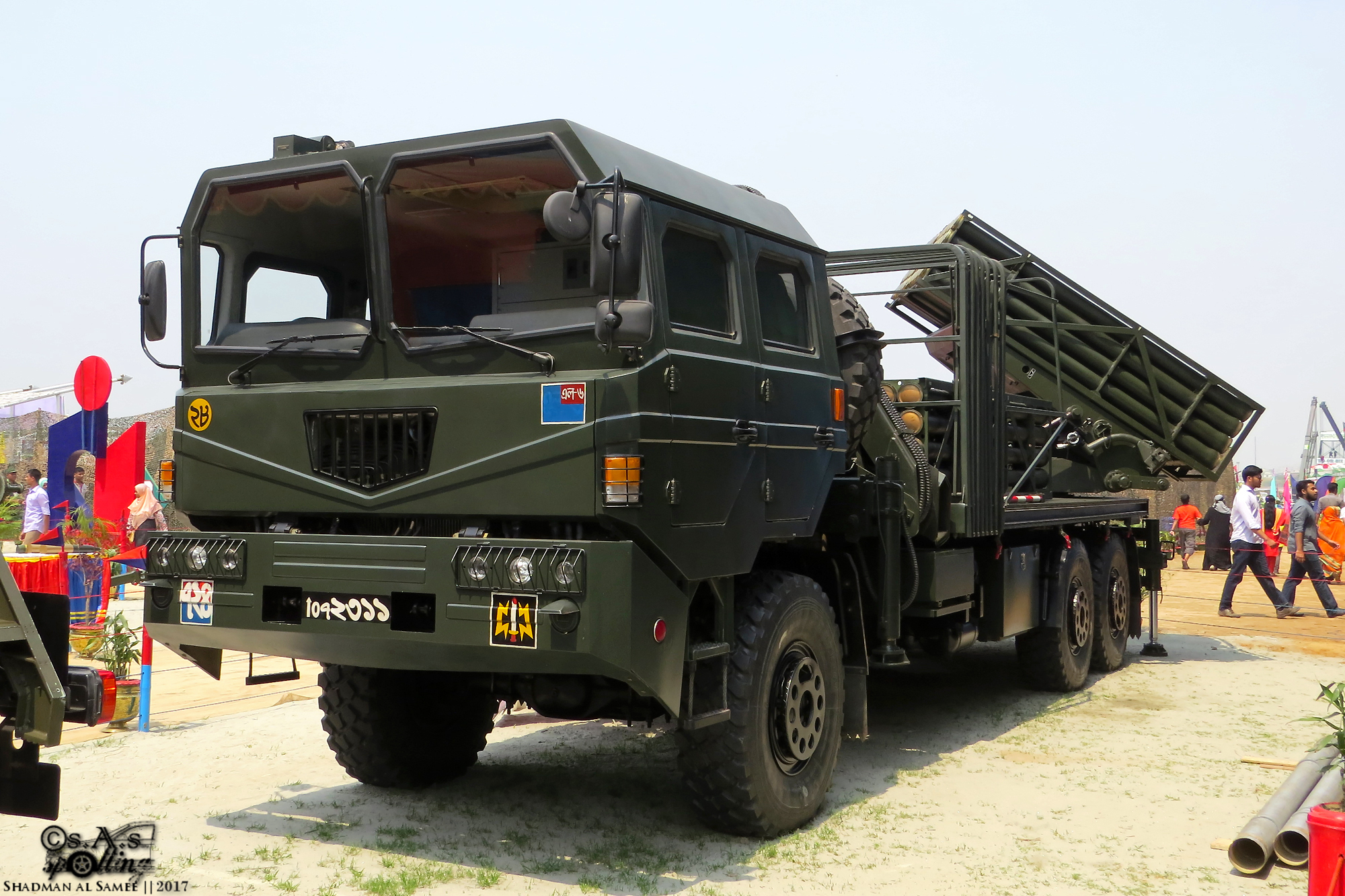
A WS-22 SPMRL of the Bangladesh Army.

- WS-22 SPMRL: A guided version of 122 mm PR50 MLS with primitive cascade inertial terminal guidance, with standard range of 20 to 30 km
- CTL-181A MRL: A Dongfeng Mengshi variants fitted with 122 mm multiple rocket launcher and modular ammunition storage unit.

=== Croatia ===
- LRSV-122 M-96 "Tajfun" (samovozni višecijevni lanser raketa): Modified version of M-77 Oganj with 128 mm barrels replaced with 122 mm barrels due to lack of missiles in 128 mm caliber, in 4 rows of 8 launch tubes for use with Grad calibre rockets placed on unarmoured Tatra T813 truck instead of FAP trucks that were damaged beyond repair. About four such conversions were done on Tatra chassis. Like the M-77 Oganj, the launcher and reloading pack are covered by a collapsible awning for protection and camouflage when travelling. Combat weight: 23.5 t. Only a very small number was built.

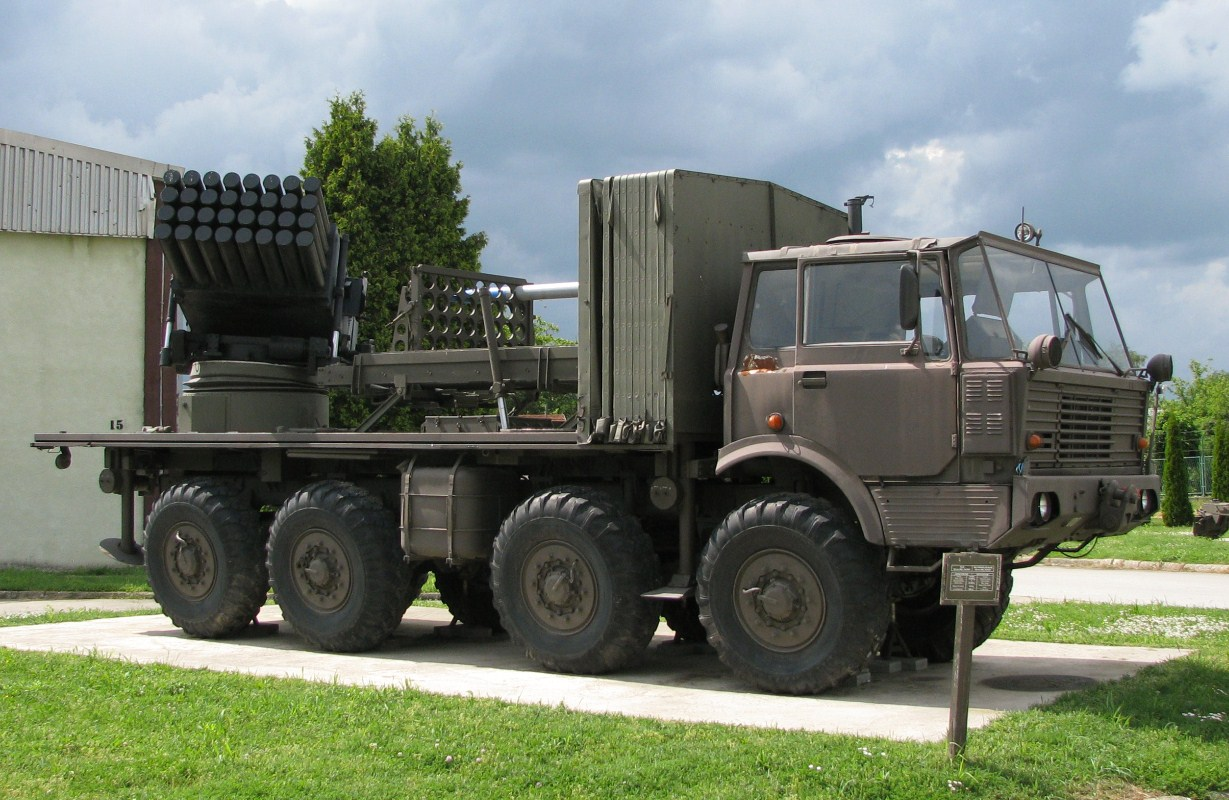
A LRSV-122 M-96 "Tajfun

- LRSV-122 M-92 "Vulkan" (samovozni višecijevni lanser raketa): Modified version of M-77 Oganj with 128 mm barrels replaced with 122 mm barrels due to lack of missiles in 128 mm caliber, in 4 rows of 8 launch tubes for use with Grad caliber.

=== Czechoslovakia ===
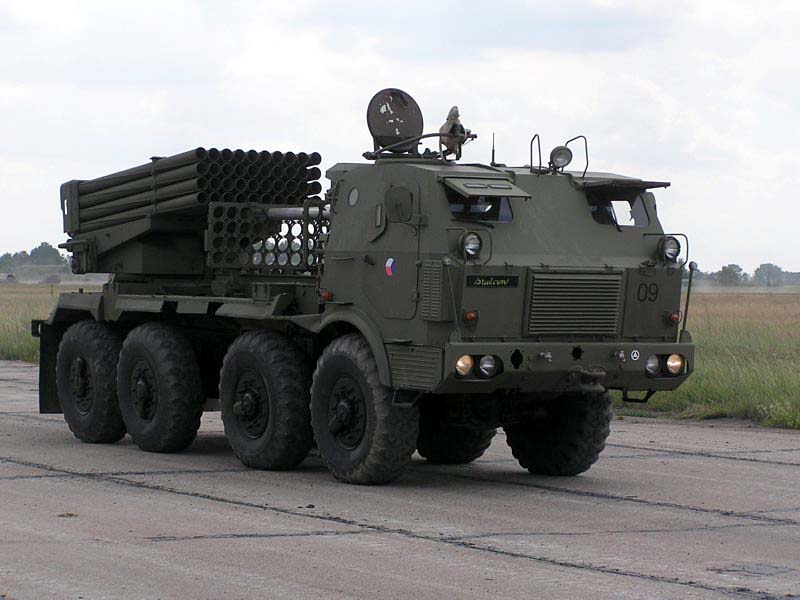
A RM-70 launch vehicle, a Czechoslovak variant with the BM-21 launch vehicle launcher unit.

- RM-70 (122 mm RAKETOMET vz. 70): In 1972, the Czechoslovak Army introduced its own version of the BM-21 launch vehicle, designated the RM-70. The launcher unit comprises a bank of 40 launch tubes arranged in 4 rows of 10 and mounted on an 8x8 10-ton modified Tatra 813 truck. Unlike the BM-21, the RM-70 has an armoured cab and enough room behind it to allow for the storage of a further 40 rockets. These rockets can be automatically reloaded into the launcher at the same time.
  - RM-70/85: Modification of RM-70 launch vehicle on unarmored Tatra 815 truck.

=== Czech Republic ===
- RM 70 Vampire: RM 70 modern version on a Tatra 817 8x8 chassis with a digital fire control system, introduced in 2015.
- BM-21 MT STRIGA: BM-21 launch vehicle on a Tatra 817 4x4 chassis with a digital fire control system, without a spare rack for immediate reload, introduced in 2022.

=== Egypt ===
The Egyptians domestically manufacture the rockets Sakr-18 and Sakr-36, with a respective range of 18 km (11 mi) and 36 km (22 mi), and the latest Sakr-45 with a superior range of 45 km (28 mi). Rather than a standard HE-Frag round, the Egyptian military prefers a 23-kilogram (51 lb) cluster munition, which can be extremely effective against lightly armored equipment and troop concentrations. Both rockets, as well as the original Soviet models of course, are fired by locally manufactured rocket launchers like the RL-21 (copy of BM-11) and RC-21 (copy of BM-21, similar to the Hadid HM20). The Helwan Machine Tools Company also produces portable systems with one, three, four and eight launch tubes. Also, the RAAD 200 is a BM-21 on a new tracked vehicle.

=== Ethiopia ===
The Homicho Ammunition Engineering Complex produces the rockets while the Bishoftu Motorization Engineering Complex produces the launching tubes and has converted existing trucks to diesel engine. Bishoftu Motorization has also produced a six tube launcher to be mounted on light trucks.

=== Gaza Strip ===
Since 2006, Hamas has fired 122 mm Grad rockets, copies made in Iran, and Eastern-bloc versions modified to expand their range, into Israel. The rockets were believed to be brought into the Gaza Strip via tunnels from Egypt. Some of the rockets were of a Chinese Grad variant. Hamas sources said they were pleased by the performance of the Chinese variants of the BM-21 Grad rocket, which demonstrated a far greater range and blast impact than Palestinian-made rockets, as well as Russian-origin Grads or Katyushas.

Hamas have used small man-portable single-tube launchers for rockets in attacks against Israel, designated 122 mm 9P132/BM-21-P. The 122 mm Grad rockets used in Gaza have a range of about 40 km (25 mi), and can reach the Israeli towns of Ashdod, Beer-Sheva, Ofakim, Gedera, Kiryat Gat, Ashqelon, Sderot, Rehovot, Kiryat Malachi and Gan Yavne. They also published a clip claiming device mounted used as a multi-barrel rocket launcher on vehicle used for first time in Gaza. On 7 April 2011, the Iron Dome system successfully intercepted a Grad rocket launched from Gaza for the first time. The rockets were launched without their dedicated platforms and by untrained operators which causes very low accuracy. Over 50% of the rockets miss entire cities and over 10% end up hitting the sea.

=== Georgia ===
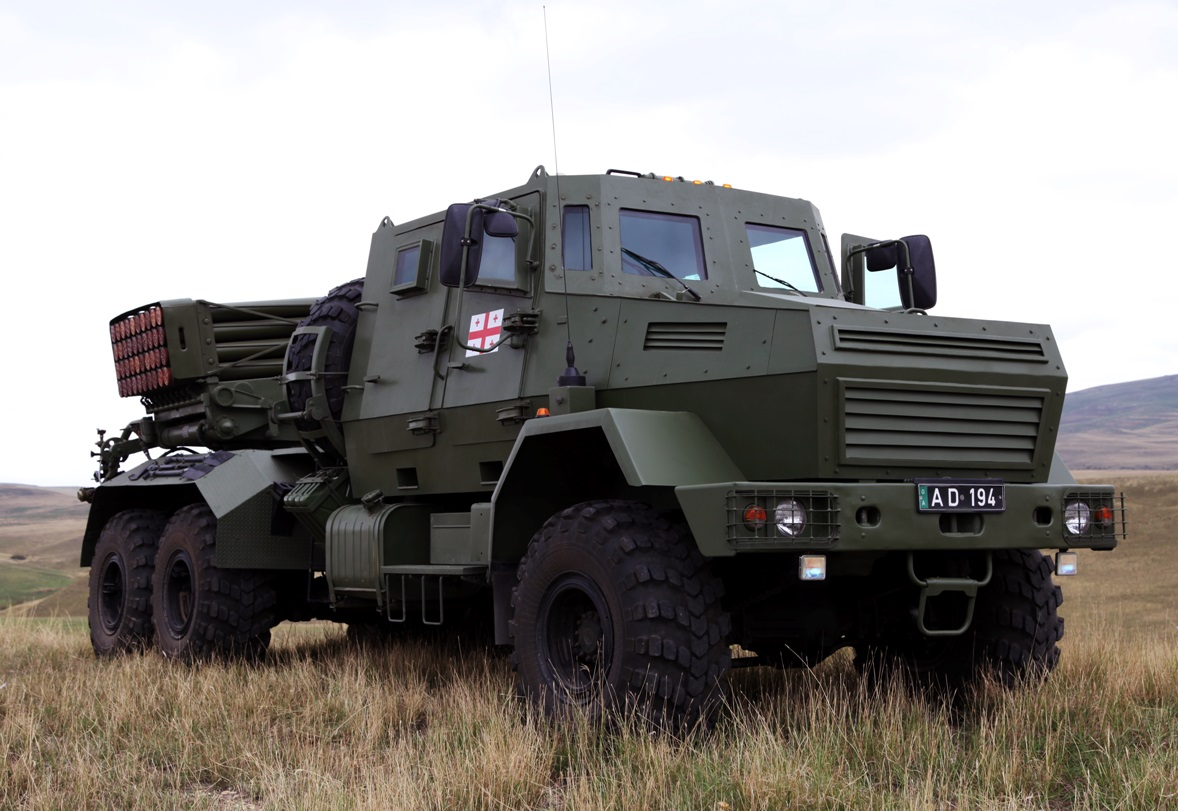
A Georgian RS-122, a heavily upgraded and automated version of the Soviet BM-21 based on the Ukrainian KrAZ-63221 chassis

- RS-122 Magaria: In March 2012, the Republic of Georgia unveiled its own heavily modified self-propelled version of the BM-21 Grad. There are innovative improvements similar to that of its Polish counterpart. The crew cabin is armoured and well-protected in accordance with STANAG level 2 or higher. The 40-tube launcher is fitted with a pinpoint targeting system and has a maximum firing distance of 45 km depending on ammunition, guaranteeing much more precision at greater distances. There is enough room for an additional 40-tube pack. The launcher can be deployed and activated directly from inside the crew cab, greatly decreasing time between salvos. However, the traditional external setup is also available. An entire barrage can be fired in less than 20 seconds. The general purpose platform can also be used for more sophisticated rocket systems.

=== Iran ===
D.I.O. from Iran produces copies of the BM-11 and BM-21 systems that can fire the original Soviet rockets as well as the locally developed "Arash" with a range of 20.5 km (12.7 mi). There is also a rocket with a range of 75 km (47 mi).

- Heidar-44: A 40-tube version of the BM-21 based on a KrAZ truck chassis.
- HM20: This is the Iranian version of the BM-21, mounted on a Mercedes-Benz 2624 6×6 truck. However, the launch pack consists of two packs of 20 tubes. Reportedly there is also a version with an automatic reload-system. The latest version is mounted on 6×6 MAN trucks.
- HM23: Lighter 16-round version with two packs of 8 launch tubes.
- HM27: An 8-round version based on the Toyota Land Cruiser truck.
- Raad: Iranian version of the 24-round BM-11, based on a Mercedes-Benz LA 911B 4x4 truck. Some vehicles are equipped with a light hydraulic crane. Not to be confused with an ATGM or a self-propelled howitzer of the same name.

=== Iraq ===
Various 122 mm-type rockets were deployed by Iraq during the Iran-Iraq war, modified to deliver nerve agents to targets. This included the 40-inch long, domestically produced Grad MLRS-compatible "Borak" warhead designed to disperse sarin gas.

=== Italy ===
Produced a limited number of FIROS 25 and 30 rocket launchers. They had the same configuration, exactly 40 rockets 122 mm caliber, compatible also with BM-21 launcher. Range about 25–32 km, sold to Libya, United Arab Emirates and probably other customers. About 150 produced in '80s-'90s.

=== North Korea ===
- BM-11: North Korean 30-tube version. The tubes are arranged in 2 banks of 15; all rockets can be fired in as little as 15 seconds. The basis for the BM-11 system is an unlicensed copy of the Japanese-manufactured Isuzu HTS12G 2.5 ton truck chassis.
- MRL 122 mm M1977: U.S. DIA code for a system that appears to be a direct copy of the BM-21 "Grad".
- MRL 122 mm M1985: This is a more modern version, based on an Isuzu 6×6 truck and probably with a 40-round reload pack mounted between the cab and the launcher.

=== Pakistan ===
- KRL 122: Kahuta Research Laboratories from Pakistan have developed a rocket launcher based on the BM-21 Grad. The KRL 122 was originally based on an Isuzu truck but later models use the Reo M35 truck. Some sources mention the designator Ghazab. In addition to the original Soviet rockets, the system can launch the Yarmuk Rockets developed by Pakistan Ordnance Factories. The KRL 122 has achieved a maximum range of over 40 km due to the use of upgraded 122 mm rockets.

=== Poland ===
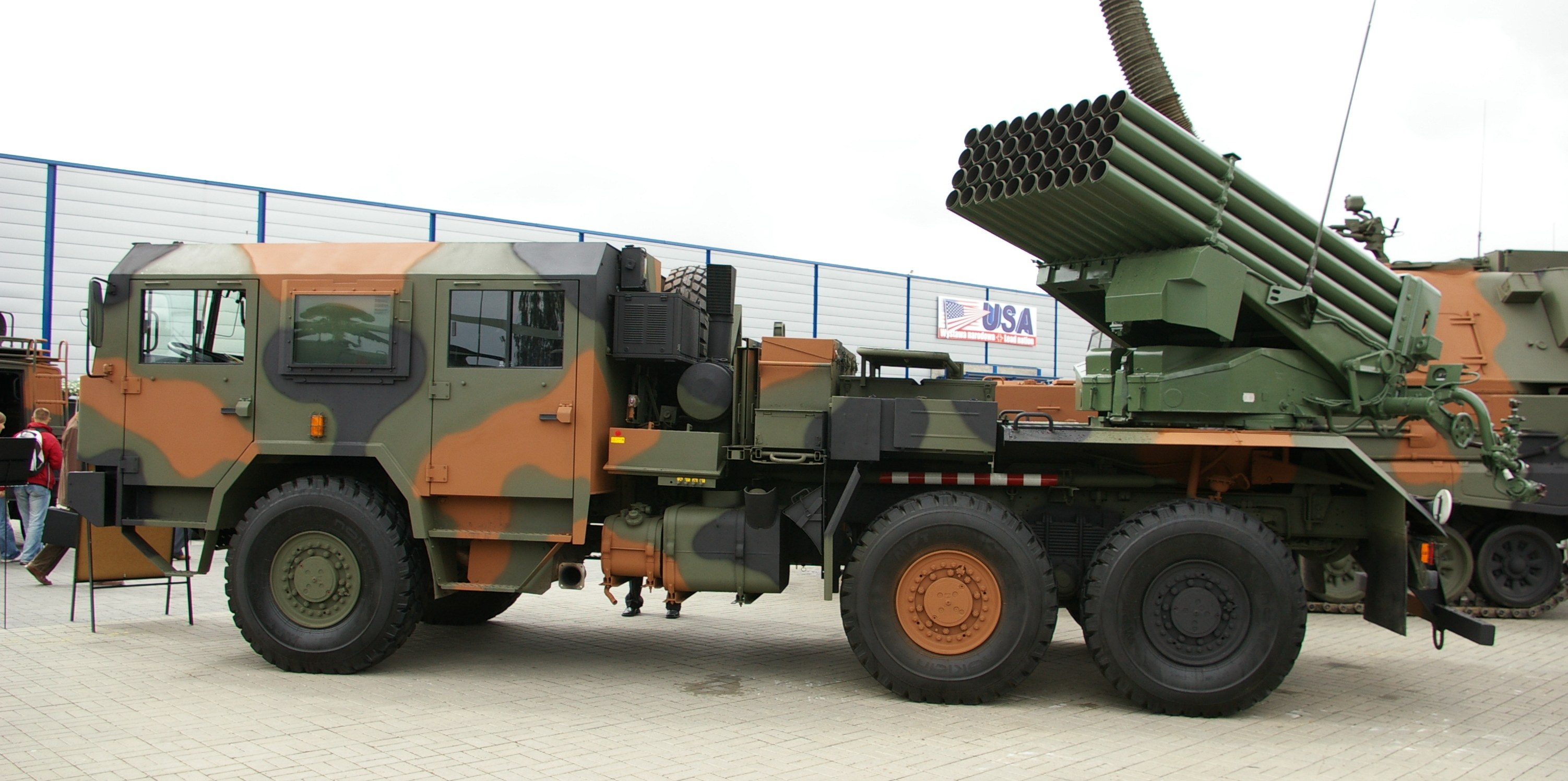
A WR-40 Langusta, a deeply modernized and automated version, of the Soviet BM-21 based on the Jelcz P662D.35 6x6 truck, displayed at the MSPO 2007.

- WR-40 "Langusta" (eng. spiny lobster) (wyrzutnia rakietowa means rocket launcher): This is a modern Polish version with a new fire control system (with ballistic computer BFC201 and navigation system Sigma 30) and a modified launcher based on the Jelcz P662D.35G-27 6×6 truck, produced by Jelcz Komponenty. The first vehicle entered service on 20 March 2007. Probably about half of all 227 Polish BM-21 launchers will be converted into WR-40 launchers. New, modern types of munition were also developed for the launcher: the range is approximately 42 km (26 mi) for fragmentation-HE rockets "Feniks-Z" and 32 km (20 mi) for cargo rockets. The Jelcz P662.D.35 truck with lightly armoured cab is also believed to be the base of a Polish multiple rocket launcher complex, which will possibly be developed in the future.

=== Romania ===
- APR-21 (aruncător de proiectile reactive – rocket launcher): Romanian 21-round launcher (3 rows of 7) mounted on a Bucegi SR-114 4x4 chassis. No longer used by the Romanian Army but some vehicles have been exported to Nigeria and Croatia. Morocco has the launch pack mounted on a Kaiser M35 truck.
- APR-40: Initially this designator was used for the original BM-21 "Grad" in Romanian service, but Aerostar SA has developed an improved model, based on a DAC-665T 6x6 truck. A slightly improved model, called APRA-40 or 40 APRA 122 FMC is based on the DAC 15.215 DFAEG truck. Each launcher is normally accompanied by a resupply truck MITC with a 6t crane and a trailer RM13. The system is also used by Botswana, Bosnia, Cameroon, Croatia, Iran, Iraq, Liberia, Nigeria and Ukraine.
  - LAROM or LAROM 160: This is an upgraded version that was developed in cooperation with Israel. The launch vehicle is based on the truck chassis DAC 25.360 DFAEG, fitted with two launch packs with each 20 122 mm tubes or 13 160 mm tubes. The LAROM 160 can fire rockets like the LAR Mk.IV with a range of 45 km (28 mi). The system entered service with the Romanian Land Forces in 2002.

=== Serbia ===
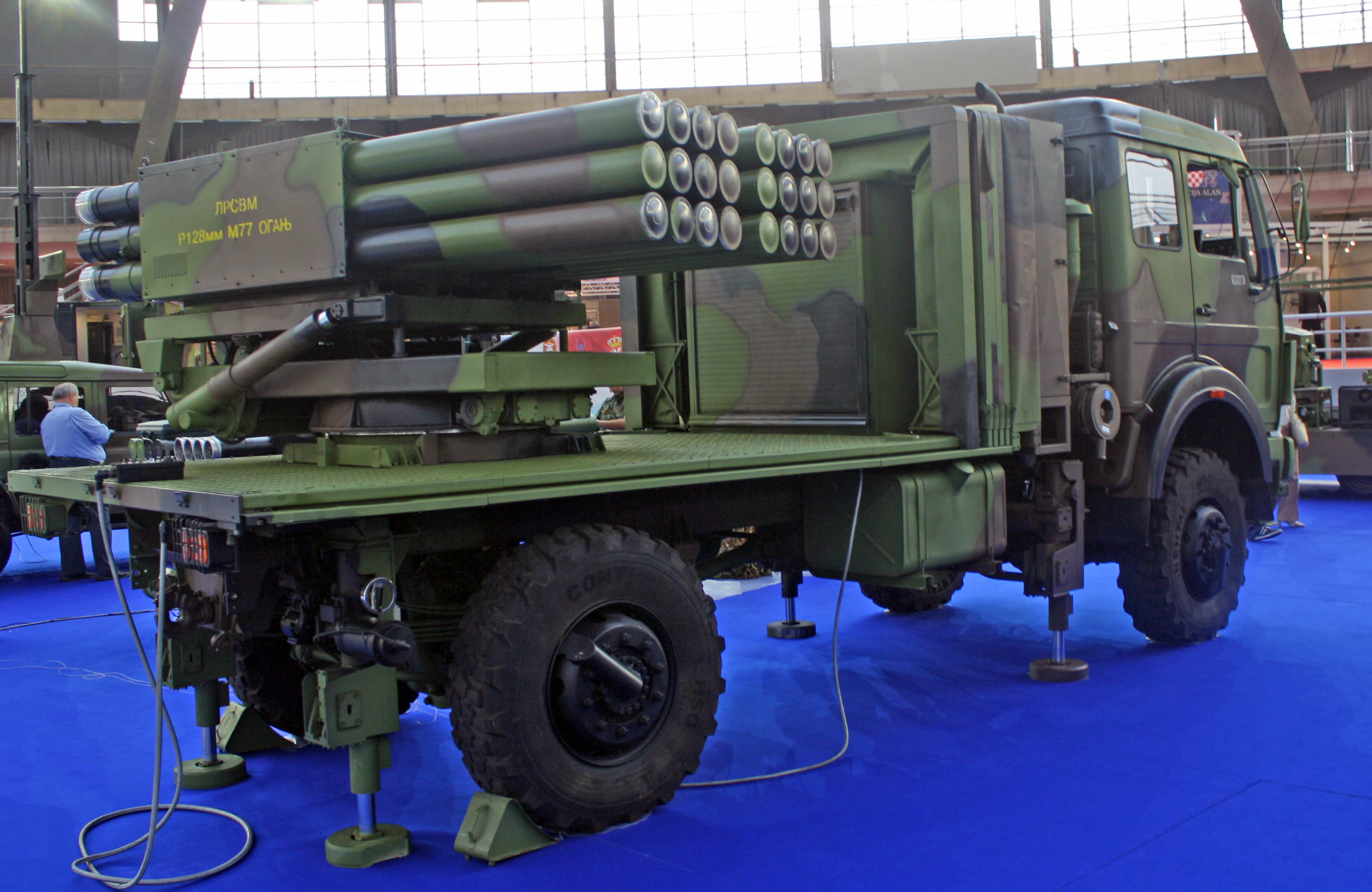
A Serbian LRSVM Morava

- LRSVM Morava: Universal modular MLRS with possibilities to use all models of Grad 122 mm rockets, both with M-77 Oganj and M-63 Plamen 128 mm rockets too.
- G-2000: Produced by EdePro, G-2000 122 mm missile is with range above 40 km.

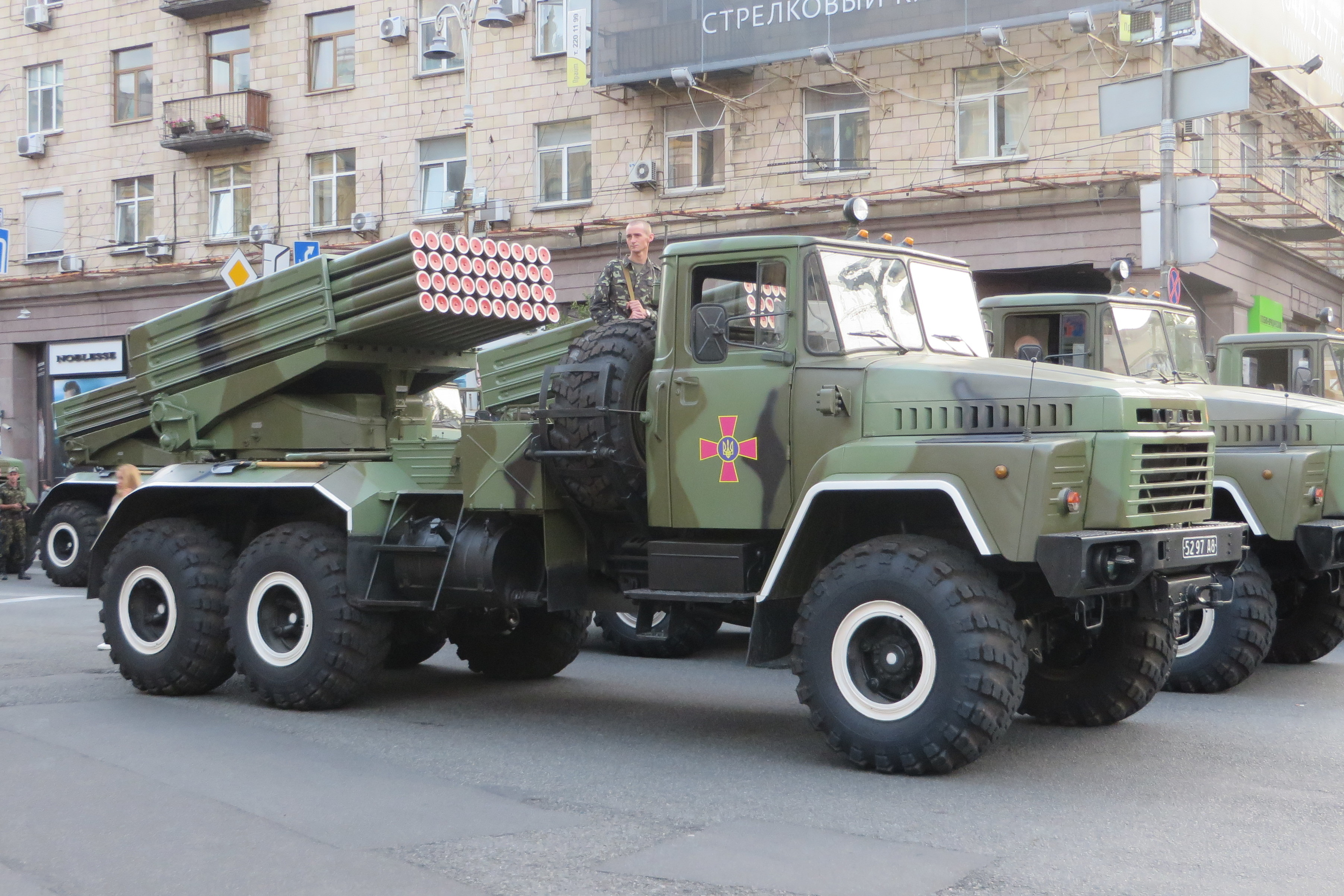
A Ukrainian BM-21 Bastion-1 based on a KrAZ-260 chassis

=== Thailand ===
- DTI-2: The 122 mm multiple rocket launcher by Defense Technology Institute.

=== Ukraine ===
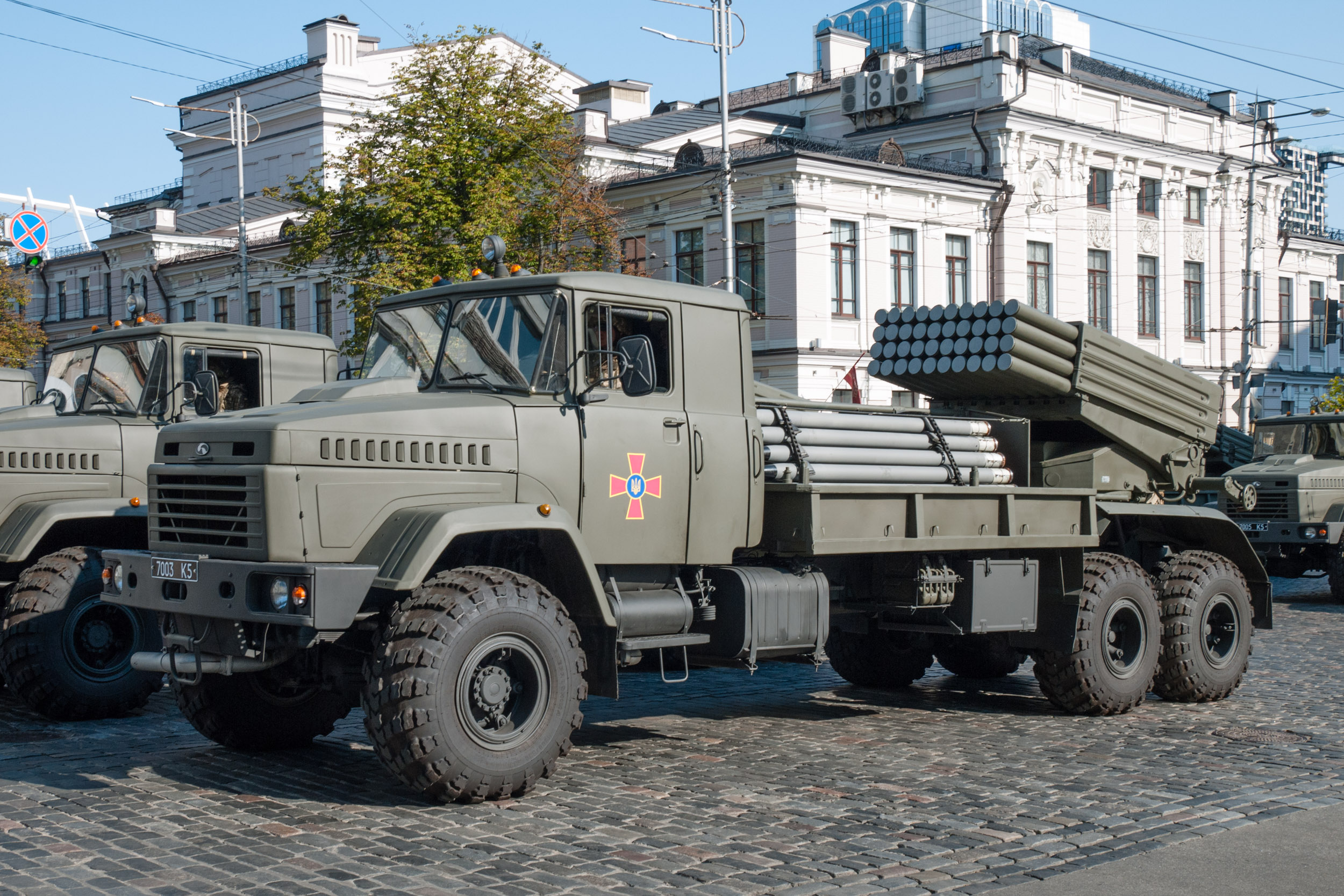
A Ukrainian Bastion-02

- BM-21K: A modernization based on a modified double-cab KrAZ-260 chassis with an improved fire control system.
- Bastion-1: A modernization based on the KrAZ-260 chassis.
- Bastion-2: A modernization based on the KrAZ-260 chassis with additional storage space for 40 missiles.
- BM-21 UM Berest
- Verba: A modernization based on a modified double-cab KrAZ-6322 chassis with a digital fire control system.
- Mini-Grad: an improvised launcher constructed from BM-21 Grad launch tubes mounted on a pickup truck, enhanced with additional features to improve survivability and short-range accuracy.

== Projectiles ==
The original "Grad" rocket has a range of about 20 kilometers (12 mi). The first modification called "G-M" increased the range to about 27.5 kilometers (17.1 mi), while the second modification "G-2000" further increased the range to about 40 kilometers (25 mi). The latest technology development has allowed new Grad rockets to have 52 kilometers (32 mi) range. The range may also vary due to the type of warhead.

The 9M22S munition (see below) was developed by NPO Splav during the Soviet era. Instead of a high-explosive fragmentation warhead, the 9M22S rocket carries a warhead containing 180 separate 9N510 incendiary submunitions. Designed to ignite vegetation, storage facilities, or fuel, these incendiary elements consist of hexagonal prisms made from a magnesium alloy known to the Russian GOST as ML-5, filled with a thermite mixture. Each element has a nominal length of 40 mm and a width of 25 mm and a burning time of at least 2 minutes. The effect of these incendiary, as well as conventional lighting munitions (especially at night), outwardly resembles the use of phosphorus munitions.

As of 2024, India's DRDO is developing ERR 122 rockets for the Indian Army's BM-21 launchers, modified as Agnibaan with Ashok Leyland chassis. The rocket was first tested on 25 June 2021. Further, IIT Madras is undertaking the development of a ramjet propulsion technology which is expected to enhance the range to 80 kilometers (50 mi).

	Origin	Ammunition type	Minimum range		Maximum range		Length		Weight		Warhead weight	
	Origin	Ammunition type	metres	miles	metres	miles	metres	ft in	kg	lb	kg	lb
9M22U (M-21OF)	USSR/Russia	Fragmentation-HE	5,000	3.1	20,380	12.66	2.87	9 ft 5 in	66.6	147	18.4	41
9M18	USSR/Russia	POM-2 submunitions										
9M28F	USSR/Russia	Fragmentation-HE	1,500	0.93	15,000	9.3	2.27	7 ft 5 in	56.5	125	21.0	46.3
9M28K	USSR/Russia	Anti-tank mines			13,400	8.3	3.04	10 ft 0 in	57.7	127	22.8	50
9M43	USSR/Russia	Smoke			20,000	12	2.95	9 ft 8 in	66	146	20.2	45
9M217	USSR/Russia	Anti-tank submunitions			30,000	19	3.04	10 ft 0 in	70	150	25	55
9M218	USSR/Russia	HEAT submunitions			30,000	19	3.04	10 ft 0 in	70	150	25	55
9M519	USSR/Russia	RF jammer			18,500	11.5	3.04	10 ft 0 in	66	146	18.4	41
9M521	USSR/Russia	Fragmentation-HE			40,000	25	2.87	9 ft 5 in	66	146	21	46
9M522	USSR/Russia	Fragmentation-HE			37,500	23.3	3.04	10 ft 0 in	70	150	25	55
PRC-60	USSR/Russia	Underwater charge (for BM-21PD)	300	0.19	5,000	3.1	2.75	9 ft 0 in	75.3	166	20	44
Type 90A	China	Fragmentation-HE	12,700	7.9	32,700	20.3	2.75	9 ft 0 in			18.3	40
M21-OF-FP	Romania	Fragmentation-HE	5,000–6,000	3.1–3.7	20,400	12.7	2.87	9 ft 5 in	65.4	144	6.35	14.0
M21-OF-S	Romania	Fragmentation-HE	1,000	0.62	12,700	7.9	1.927	6 ft 3.9 in	46.6	103	6.35	14.0
Edepro G2000/52	Serbia	Fragmentation-HE			40,200	25.0	2.862	9 ft 4.7 in	64.4	142	19.0	41.9
Sakr-45A	Egypt	AT / AP submunitions			42,000	26	3.31	10 ft 10 in	67.5	149	24.5	54
Sakr-45B	Egypt	Fragmentation-HE			45,000	28	2.9	9 ft 6 in	63.5	140	20.5	45
9M22S	USSR/Russia	Incendiary	1,500	0.93	19,890	12.36	2.97	9 ft 9 in	66	146	17.8	39
9M28S	USSR/Russia	Incendiary	1,650	1.03	15,070	9.36	2.318	7 ft 7.3 in	53	117	17.8	39
ERR-122	India	Fragmentation-HE			40,000	25	2.912	9 ft 6.6 in	66.5	147	21	46

Also Incendiary, Chemical, Illumination, Antipersonnel mines.

== Operators ==
Operators Current Former

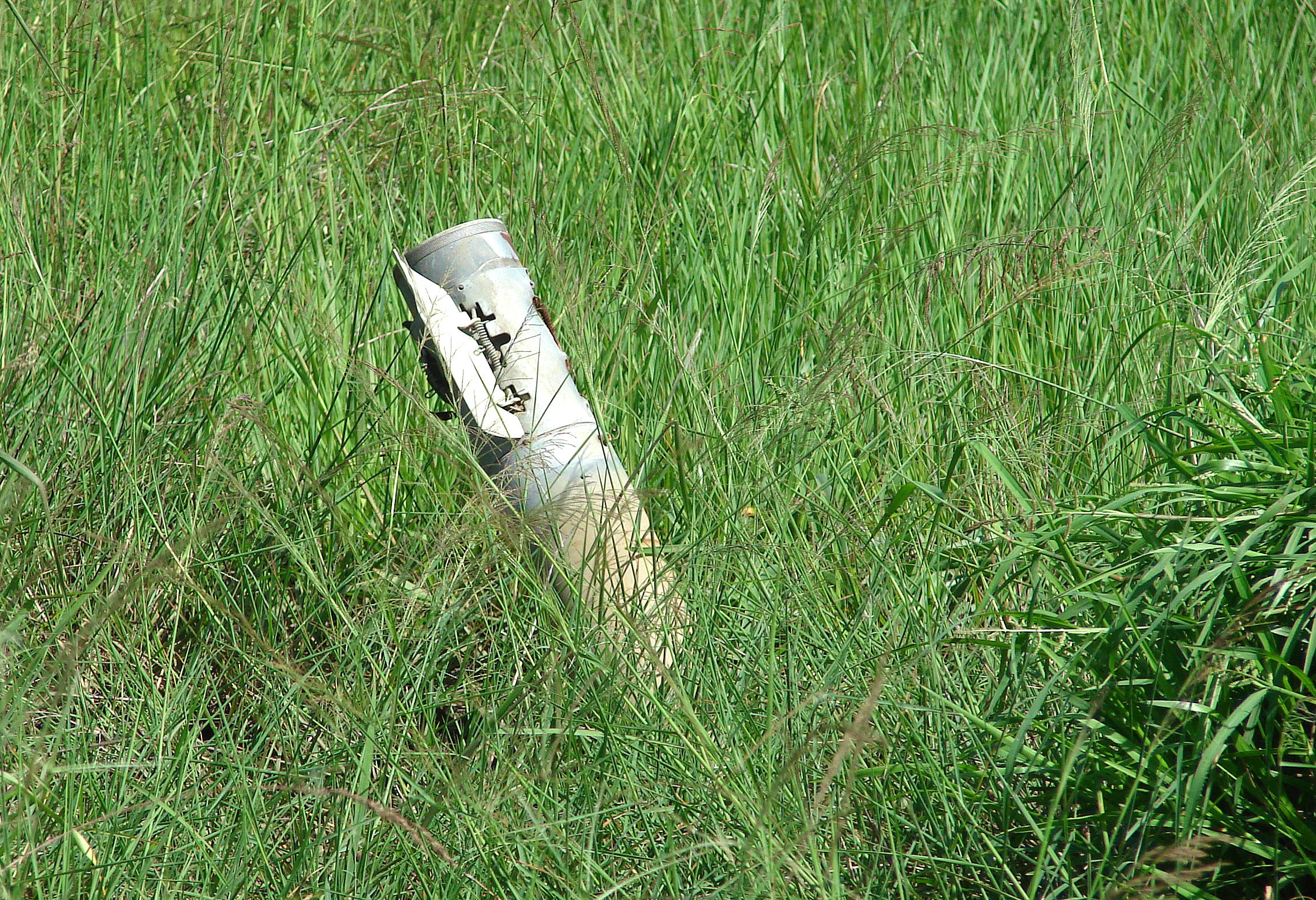
A fired 122 mm projectile of a RM-70 multiple rocket launcher stuck in muddy land in Vakarai, Batticaloa during the Sri Lankan Civil War (2007).

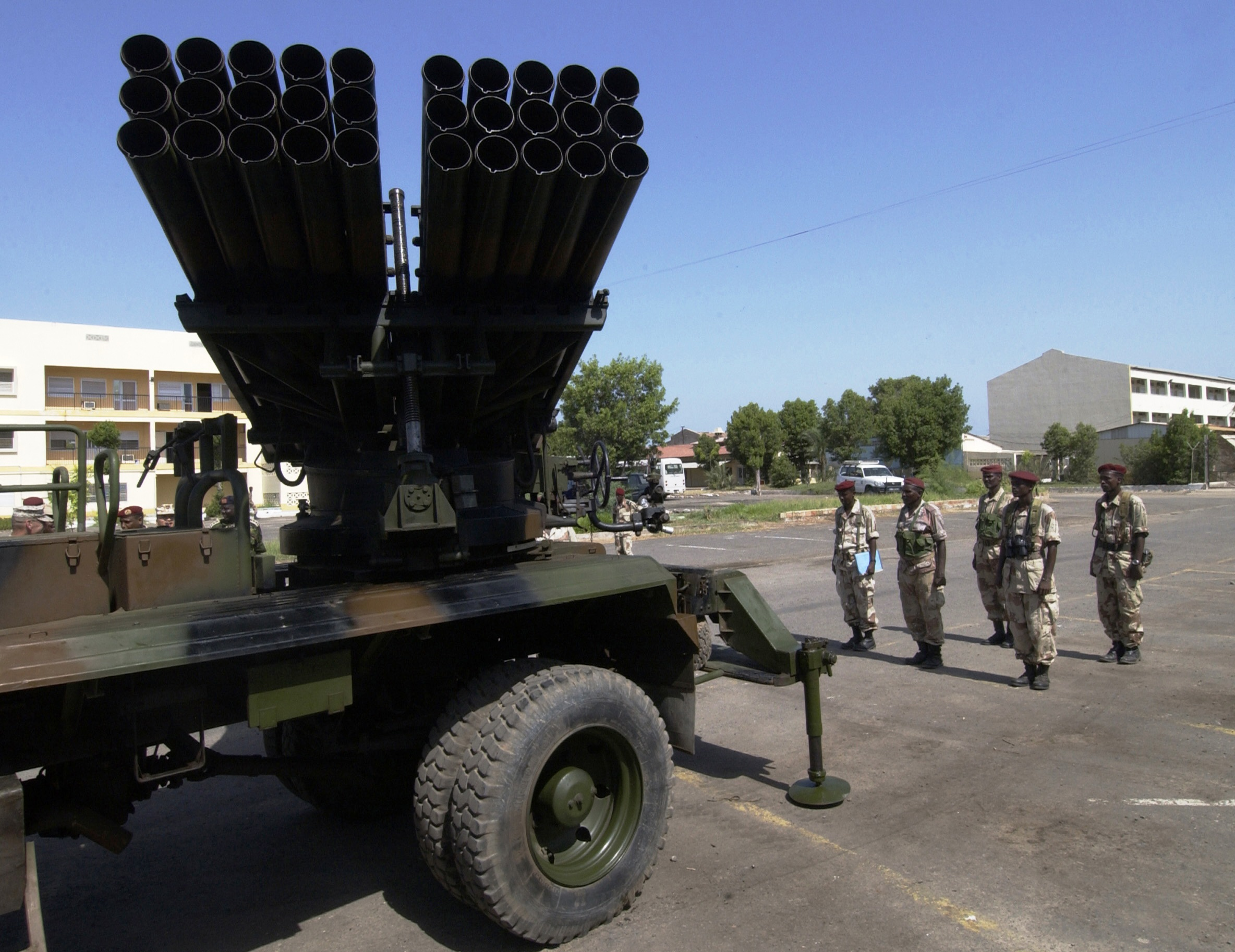
A Djiboutian Army Rocket Launcher

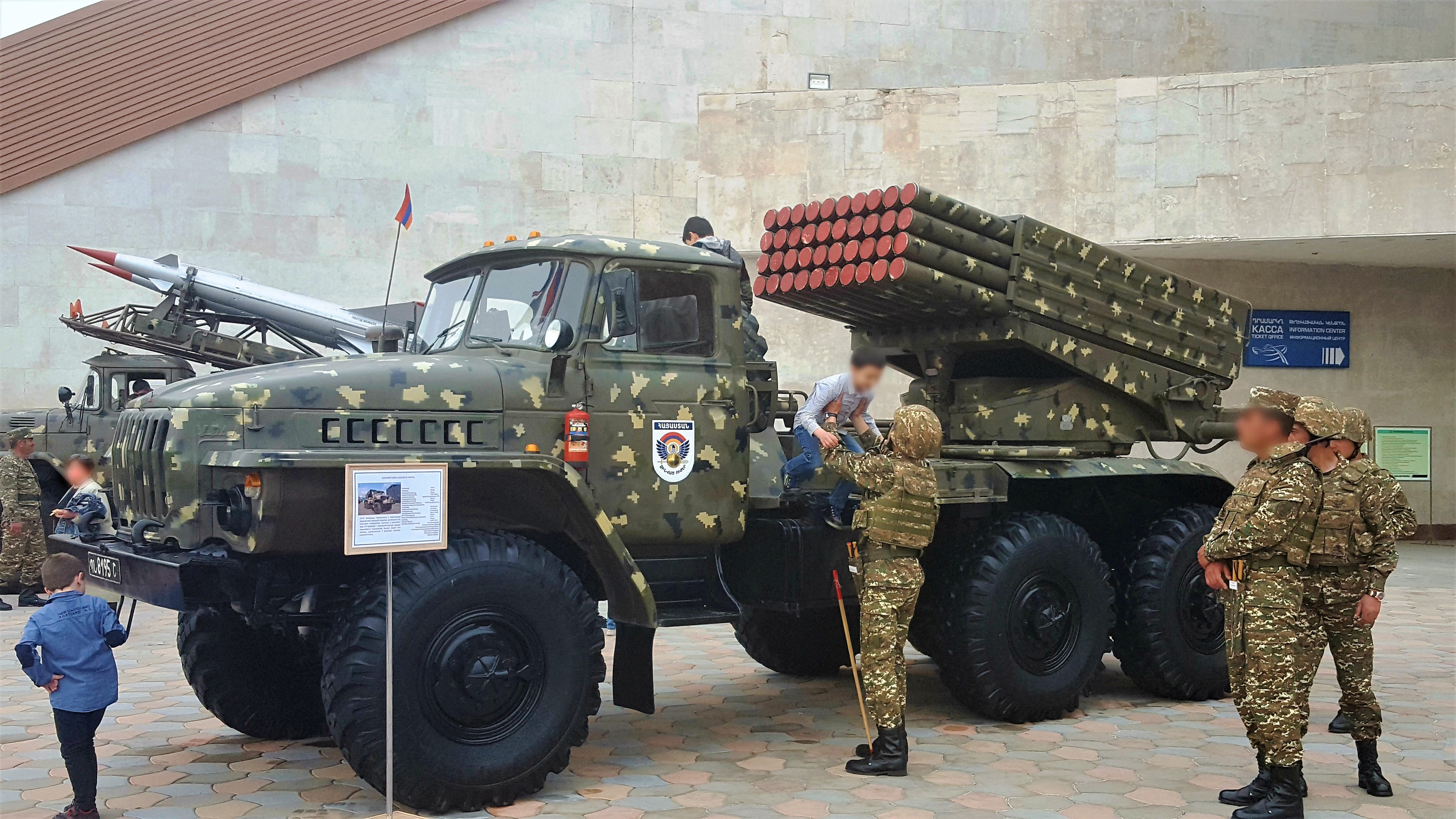
A BM-21 on display near the Karen Demirchyan Complex, Yerevan, Armenia

The 156th Mechanized Brigade showing BM-21 combat operations during training, Ukraine

=== Current operators ===
- Afghanistan: Unknown number in service as of 2024.
- Algeria: 48 BM-21 Grad in service as of 2024.
- Angola: 70 BM-21 Grad and 40 RM-70 in service as of 2024.
- Armenia: Up to 50 BM-21 Grad in service as of 2024.
- Azerbaijan: 54 BM-21 Grad, 24 BM-21V, 16 IMI Lynx, 18 RM-70 and 18 T-122 in service as of 2024.
- Bangladesh: 36+ WS-22 in service as of 2024.
- Belarus: 128 BM-21 Grad in service as of 2024.
- Bosnia and Herzegovina: 24 APRA-40 in service as of 2024.
- Botswana: 20 APRA-40 in service as of 2024.
- Bulgaria: 24 BM-21 Grad as of 2024.
- Burkina Faso: 5 APR-40 in service as of 2024.
- Burundi: 12 BM-21 Grad in service as of 2024.
- Cambodia: 8 BM-21 Grad, 20 RM-70, approximately 20 PHL-81 and some PHL-90B in service as of 2024.
- Cameroon: 20 BM-21 Grad as of 2024.
- Chad: 6 BM-21 Grad and 5 PHL-81 as of 2024.
- China: 200 PHL-81/90, 350 PHL-11, 375 PHZ-89, 120 PHZ-11 and 50+ PHL-20/21/161 in service as of 2024.
- Congo-Brazzaville: 10 BM-21 Grad as of 2024.
- Congo-Kinshasa: 24 BM-21 Grad and some RM-70 in service as of 2024.
- Côte d'Ivoire: 6 BM-21 Grad in service as of 2024.
- Croatia: 21 BM-21 Grad and 6 M91 Vulkan in service as of 2024.
- Cuba: An uncertain number of BM-21 Grad in service as of 2024.
- Cyprus: 4 BM-21 Grad as of 2024.
- Ecuador: 18 BM-21 Grad and 6 RM-70 as of 2024.
- Egypt: 60 BM-21 Grad, 96 BM-11, 200 Sakr-10/18/36 and an uncertain number of ATS-59G in service as of 2024.
- Eritrea: 35 BM-21 Grad in service as of 2024.
- Ethiopia: Estimated 50 BM-21 Grad in service as of 2024.
- Finland: 34 RM-70 in service as of 2024.
- Georgia: 13 BM-21 Grad, 6 GradLAR and 18 RM-70 in service as of 2024.
- Ghana: 3 PHL-81 in service as of 2024.
- Greece: 108 RM-70 in service as of 2024.
- India: Estimated 150 BM-21 Grad in service as of 2024.
- Iran: 100 BM-21 Grad, 7 BM-11 and 50 Arash/Hadid/Noor in service as of 2024.
- Iraq: An uncertain number of BM-21 Grad as of 2024.
  - (Kurdistan Region) Iraqi Kurdistan
- Kazakhstan: 80 BM-21 Grad as of 2024.
- Kyrgyzstan: 15 BM-21 Grad in service as of 2024.
- Lebanon: 11 BM-21 Grad as of 2024.
  - Hezbollah
- Mali: 30+ BM-21 Grad in service as of 2024.
- Mauritania: 6 PHL-81 in service as of 2024.
- Mexico: 6 Italian Firos-25 in service as of 2024.
- Mongolia: 130 BM-21 Grad in service as of 2024.
- Morocco: 35 BM-21 Grad in service as of 2024.
- Mozambique: 12 BM-21 Grad in service as of 2024.
- Myanmar: 230 9P138 "Grad-1" which are upgraded with MAM-01's turrets and rocket launchers, 20 Chinese Type-81 and 90 Type-90B in service. Unknown number remaining in service as of 2024.
- Namibia: 5 BM-21 Grad and 3 PHL-81 in service as of 2024.
- Nicaragua: 18 BM-21 Grad and 100 BM-21P single-tube rocket launchers as of 2024.
- Nigeria: 9 BM-21 Grad, 25 APR-21 and 7 RM-70 in service as of 2024.
- North Korea: Unknown number of BM-11, BM-21 (M-1977), M-1985, M-1992, M-1993, and VTT-323 in service as of 2024.
- North Macedonia: 6 BM-21 Grad as of 2024.
- Pakistan: 52 Chinese PHL-83 and 200 KRL-122 as of 2025.
- Palestine: Hamas, Palestinian Islamic Jihad and other militants (including Iranian made 20 km range and Chinese 40 km range Grad variants)
- Peru: 22 BM-21 Grad and 27 Type-90B as of 2024.
- Poland: 27 BM-21 Grad, 29 RM-70 and 75 WR-40 as of 2024.
- Romania: 134 APRA-40 and 36 LAROM in service as of 2024.
- Russia: 454 BM-21 Grad and 160+ 9K51M Tornado-G in service with a further 1500 BM-21 Grad in storage as of 2024. At least 294 BM-21 Grad variants and 2 command vehicles have been lost in the War in Ukraine as of 22 December 2024.
- Rwanda: 5 RM-70 in service as of 2024.
- Senegal: 6 BM-21 Grad (Ukrainian Bastion-1) in service as of 2024.
- Slovakia: 4 RM-70 and 26 RM-70/85 as of 2024.
- Somalia
  - Somaliland
- South Sudan: Some BM-21 Grad in service as of 2024.
- Sri Lanka: 22 RM-70 and 6 KRL-122 in service as of 2024.
- Sudan: An uncertain number of BM-21 Grad, Saqr and PHL-81 in service as of 2024.
- Syria: An uncertain number of BM-21 Grad in service as of 2024. 17 BM-21 Grad and 1 9P138-1 captured by HTS rebel forces during the 2024 Syrian rebel offensive.
  - People's Defense Units (YPG): 1
- Tajikistan: 14 BM-21 Grad as of 2024.
- Tanzania: 58 BM-21 Grad as of 2024.
- Thailand: 4 SR-4 as of 2024.
- Togo: Some PHL-81 as of 2024.
- Transnistria: 20+ as of 2021
- Turkey: Estimated 36 T-122 in service as of 2024.
- Turkmenistan: 70 BM-21 Grad and 18 9P138 as of 2024.
- Ukraine: 100 BM-21 Grad/9K51M Tornado-G, 8 RM-70 and 4 APR-40 in service as of 2024. At least 54 BM-21 Grad variants have been visually confirmed lost in the Russo-Ukrainian War as of 22 December 2024.
- Uganda: 6 RM-70 and some BM-21 Grad as of 2024.
- UAE: Estimated 24 Firos-25 in service as of 2024.
- Uzbekistan: 36 BM-21 Grad and 24 9P138 in service as of 2024.
- Venezuela: 24 BM-21 Grad as of 2024.
- Vietnam: 350 BM-21 Grad as of 2024.
- Zambia: 30 BM-21 Grad (12 serviceable) as of 2024.
- Zimbabwe: 60 RM-70 in service as of 2024.

=== Former operators ===
- East Germany: 72 units, passed on to the successor state.
- Hungary: 40 in service in 1980.
- Islamic State
- Israel: 58 as of 2016 No longer reported to be in service.
- Laos: Paraded in January 2019.
- Libya
- Moldova
- North Yemen: 65+, supplied in 1979
- Russian separatist forces in Donbas
- South Yemen
- Soviet Union: Passed on to successor states.
- Tigray Defense Forces − Surrendered to the Ethiopian forces in the aftermath of the Tigray War.
- Yugoslavia: Passed on to successor states.

=== Evaluation only ===
- United States: 75

== See also ==
- 9A52-4 Tornado – (Russia) variable caliber multiple rocket launcher and successor to the BM-21, BM-27, and BM-30
- Astros II – (Brazil)
- BM-14 – (Soviet Union) 140 mm multiple rocket launcher
- BM-27 Uragan – (Soviet Union) 220 mm multiple rocket launcher
- BM-30 Smerch – (Soviet Union) 300 mm multiple rocket launcher
- Fajr-5 – (Iran)
- Katyusha – (Soviet Union), BM-13, BM-8, and BM-31 multiple rocket launchers of World War II
- M270 – (United States)
- Pinaka multi-barrel rocket launcher – (India)
- T-122 Sakarya – (Turkey)
- Mini-Grad – (Ukraine) improvised MLRS adapted from BM-21 parts

== Bibliography ==
- Prenatt, Jamie; Hook, Adam (2016). Katyusha: Russian Multiple Rocket Launchers 1941–Present. New Vanguard 235. Oxford: Osprey Publishing Ltd. ISBN 978-1-4728-1086-1.
- International Institute for Strategic Studies (1980). The Military Balance 1980–1981. Routledge. ISBN 0-85368-197-X.
- International Institute for Strategic Studies (February 2016). The Military Balance 2016. Vol. 116. Routledge. ISBN 978-1-85743-835-2.
- International Institute for Strategic Studies (February 2020). The Military Balance 2020. Vol. 120. Routledge. ISBN 978-0-367-46639-8.
- International Institute for Strategic Studies (February 2021). The Military Balance 2021. Vol. 121. Routledge. ISBN 978-1-032-01227-8.
