= List of military equipment of the Islamic State =

This is a list of some of the military equipment formerly and currently used by the Islamic State (also known as IS, ISIS, ISIL and the Daesh).

== Small arms ==
=== Assault and battle rifles ===
Name	Type	Quantity	Origin	Photo	Notes
MAS-36	Bolt-action rifle	?	France		Seen service by IS insurgents in Syria, 2019.
Karabiner 98k	Bolt-action rifle		Nazi Germany		At least one found in a weapon stash in Iraq.
SKS	Semi automatic rifle		Soviet Union		Captured from Syrian Army.
AK-47	Assault rifle	Unknown	Soviet Union		Captured from Syrian Army, some upgraded with Picatinny rails.
AKM	Assault rifle	Unknown	Soviet Union		Captured from Syrian Army.
AK-74M	Assault rifle	Unknown	Russia		
AK-103	Assault rifle		Russia		Captured from Libyan Army.
AK-63	Assault rifle	Unknown	Hungary		Captured from Syrian Army.
AMD-65	Assault rifle	Unknown	Hungary		Captured from Syrian Army.
Zastava M70	Assault rifle	Unknown	Yugoslavia		M70B1, M70AB1, and M70AB2 variants used.
Type 56 assault rifle	Assault rifle	Unknown	China		Type 56-1 and Type 56-2 variants also used.
MPi-KM	Assault rifle	Unknown	East Germany		Captured from Syrian Army.
Pistol Mitralieră model 1963/1965	Assault rifle	Unknown	Socialist Republic of Romania		Captured from Syrian Army.
vz. 58	Assault rifle	Small quantities	Czechoslovakia		Likely captured from Iraqi stockpile.
Kbk AKMS	Assault rifle		Poland		Used in Iraq and Syria.
Type 68	Assault rifle		North Korea		At least 18 were found in a weapons stash in northeast Syria.
Bushmaster XM-15	Semi automatic rifle		United States		
M16 rifle (Very Limited)	Assault rifle	Unknown	United States		Captured from Iraqi Army and police. M16A2 variant. Popular within IS.
StG 44	Assault rifle	2,200+	Nazi Germany		Around 5,000 captured by rebel forces, in common use until mid 2017 as ammunition reserves depleted.
Norinco CQ	Assault rifle		China		
Daewoo K2C	Assault rifle		South Korea		Most likely seized during delivery to the Iraqi Army, or captured from Iraqi troops.
Heckler & Koch G36	Assault rifle		Germany		
FN FAL	Battle rifle		Belgium		used in Libya
Heckler and Koch G3	Battle rifle		West Germany		used in Yemen

=== Sniper rifles and anti-material rifles ===
Name	Type	Quantity	Origin	Photo	Notes
Mosin–Nagant	Sniper rifle		Russian Empire		Limited use, mostly used by fighters in Iraq.
Dragunov SVD	Designated marksman rifle	Unknown	Soviet Union		
PSL/FPK	Designated marksman rifle		Socialist Republic of Romania		
Tabuk	Designated marksman rifle	Unknown	Iraq		Captured from the Iraqi Army.
M14 EBR (Limited)	Designated marksman rifle		United States		Captured from the Iraqi Army or Syrian opposition.
Elmech EM 992	Sniper rifle		Croatia		
Steyr SSG 69	Sniper rifle		Austria		Limited use.
AM-50 Sayyad	Anti-materiel rifle		Iran		
M99	Anti-materiel rifle		China		

=== Machine guns ===
Name	Type	Quantity	Origin	Photo	Notes
PK	General-purpose machine gun		Soviet Union		Both PK and PKM variants used.
Type 67-2	General-purpose machine gun		China		Used in Iraq.
Type 80	General-purpose machine gun		China		Captured from Syrian Army.
Rheinmetall MG3	General-purpose machine gun		West Germany		
M240	General-purpose machine gun		United States		
M249	Light machine gun		United States		
RP-46	Light machine gun		Soviet Union		
RPK	Light machine gun		Soviet Union		Both RPK and RPK-74 variants used.
Type 81	Light machine gun		China		Used in Iraq.
Browning M1919A6	Medium machine gun		United States		
KGK	Medium machine gun		Hungarian People's Republic		
DShK	Heavy machine gun		Soviet Union		Stolen from the Iraqi or Syrian army.
KPV	Heavy machine gun		Soviet Union		KPV and KPVT variants used.
M2 Browning	Heavy machine gun		United States		M2HB variant used.

=== Shotguns ===
Name	Type	Quantity	Origin	Photo	Notes
Benelli M3	Combat shotgun		Italy		Seen on a beheading video.
Franchi SPAS-12	Combat shotgun		Italy		
Double-barreled shotgun	Break action shotgun				

=== Pistols ===
Name	Type	Quantity	Origin	Photo	Notes
Glock 17	Semi-automatic pistol	Unknown	Austria		
Glock 19	Semi-automatic pistol (some converted to full-auto)	Unknown	Austria		
Browning Hi-Power	Semi-automatic pistol	Unknown	Belgium		
Beretta M9	Semi-automatic pistol	Unknown	United States		Licensed copy of the Beretta 92FS.
Beretta M1951	Semi-automatic pistol	Unknown	Italy		
Walther P99	Semi-automatic pistol	Unknown	Germany		
Makarov PM Pistol	Semi-automatic pistol	Unknown	Soviet Union		

=== Explosives, anti-tank weapons, grenade launchers, and anti-aircraft launchers ===
Name	Type	Quantity	Origin	Photo	Notes
Various IEDs	Improvised explosive device	Large quantities	Islamic State		Made with ANFO or explosives scavenged from unexploded US-made bombs.
Mk 2 grenade	Hand grenade		United States		Multiple caches.
M62 grenade	Hand grenade		United States		Multiple caches.
RGD-5	Hand grenade		Soviet Union		Captured from Iraqi and Syrian stockpiles.
F1	Hand grenade		Soviet Union		Captured from Iraqi and Syrian stockpiles.
HG 85	Hand grenade		Switzerland		Shipped to Syria by the UAE via Jordan.
RBG-6	Grenade launcher		Croatia		Used in Syria and Iraq.
B-10	Recoilless rifle		Soviet Union		Stolen from the Iraqi or Syrian Army.
SPG-9	Recoilless rifle		Soviet Union		
M40	Recoilless rifle	1	United States	M40_105_mm_RR	Seized from the Syrian opposition.
M60	Recoilless rifle		Yugoslavia		
RPG-7	Rocket propelled grenade launcher	Large quantities	Soviet Union		Commonly used.
RPG-18	Rocket-propelled grenade		Soviet Union		Used in Iraq.
RPG-22	Rocket-propelled grenade		Soviet Union		Used in Iraq and Syria.
RPG-26	Rocket-propelled grenade		Soviet Union		Used in Syria.
RPG-75	Recoilless rifle		Czechoslovakia		
Type 69 RPG	Rocket propelled grenade		China		Type 69-I variant used.
M79 Osa	Anti-tank rocket launcher		Yugoslavia		
MILAN	Anti-tank missile		France		
BGM-71 TOW	Anti-tank missile		United States		Captured from FSA.
9K111 Fagot	Anti-tank missile		Soviet Union		
9K115-2 Metis-M	Anti-tank missile		Russia		
9M133 Kornet	Anti-tank missile		Russia		
HJ-8	Anti-tank missile		China		Captured from the FSA.
FN-6	Man-portable surface-to-air missile	1	China		Reportedly used on October 3, 2014 in Baiji to shoot down an Iraqi Mi‑35M helicopter.
9K32 Strela-2	Man-portable surface-to-air missile	8	Soviet Union		"Limited, aging stock."
9K34 Strela-3	Man-portable surface-to-air missile		Soviet Union		
Hwaseong-Chong	Man-portable surface-to-air missile	1	North Korea		
FIM-92	Man-portable surface-to-air missile		United States		Stolen Iraqi stockpiles.

== Artillery ==
=== Mortars ===
Name	Type	Quantity	Origin	Photo	Notes
Al-Jaleel 60 mm mortar	60 mm infantry mortar	Large quantities	Iraq		
82-BM-37	82 mm infantry mortar	Large quantities	Soviet Union		
82-PM-41	82 mm infantry mortar	Large quantities	Soviet Union		
M120	120 mm heavy mortar		United States		
Improvised mortars	Heavy mortar		Islamic State		Caliber varies from 80 to 100 mm.

=== Towed guns ===
Name	Type	Quantity	Origin	Photo	Notes
85 mm divisional gun D-44	Field gun	1	Soviet Union		
122-mm howitzer D-30	Howitzer	2	Soviet Union		
122 mm howitzer M1938 (M-30)	Howitzer	2	Soviet Union		
D-74 122 mm field gun	Field gun	6 (2015)	Soviet Union		
M-46	Field gun	34	Soviet Union		
M198 howitzer	Howitzer	Up to 5	United States		Captured from Iraqi Army.

=== Rocket artillery ===
Name	Type	Quantity	Origin	Photo	Notes
Type 63	Multiple rocket launcher		China		

=== Anti-aircraft guns ===
Name	Type	Quantity	Origin	Photo	Notes
ZU-23-2	Towed anti-aircraft twin autocannon	83 (2015)	Soviet Union		Usually mounted on technicals.
AZP S-60	Anti-aircraft gun	21	Soviet Union		Some mounted on technicals.

== Vehicles ==
=== Logistics and utility vehicles ===
Name	Type	Quantity	Origin	Photo	Notes
UAZ-469	Off-road military light utility vehicle	8	Soviet Union		Captured in Iraq.
MTVR	6×6 tactical military truck	9	United States		10 vehicles were seized by IS. 3 vehicles were captured from Iraqi Forces and paraded through Mosul during the aftermath of Mosul's fall in June 2014. 3 others were also paraded at an unknown location and date. 1 was turned into a VBIED and triggered at an unknown location and date. 3 were captured and paraded through Raqqa during the aftermath of the Raqqa campaign (2012–2013).
M548	Tracked cargo carrier	2	United States		IS has seized 2 vehicles. The first one was captured from Iraqi-Shia militants in Khalidiya Island and the second one was captured from the PMF's 30th Brigade in the "Al-Sajr" area.
Ural-4320	6×6 off-road military truck	9	Soviet Union		Captured in Iraq.
Tatra 148	Truck	1	Czechoslovakia		Captured from the Syrian Army.
Tatra 815	Truck	1	Czechoslovakia		Captured from the Syrian Army.
GAZ-3308	Truck	1	Russia		Captured from the Syrian Army.
MAZ-6317	Truck	3	Belarus		Captured in Syria.
KrAZ-6322	Truck	5	Ukraine		At least one was transferred to IS forces in Syria.
Daewoo Novus	Truck	11	South Korea		Captured in Iraq.
HMMWV	Military light utility vehicle	≈2,300 (2015)	United States		Many captured from Iraqi Army. Main vehicle used by IS in SVBIED operations. Most of them were taken back by the Iraqi army since IS defeat. Some of them were destroyed while the damaged ones were refurbished and made operational again. (4:15 mins)
Technicals	Improvised fighting vehicles	Varies from hundreds to thousands.	Islamic State		Hundreds of variants exist, including SVBIED versions.
Safir	Off-road military light utility vehicle	1+	Iran		Captured from the Syrian Army.

=== Tanks and armored fighting vehicles ===
Name	Type	Quantity	Origin	Photo	Notes
BMP-1	Amphibious Infantry fighting vehicle	25	Soviet Union		Captured from the armies of Iraq, Syria, and other factions such as SDF and FSA. Some converted to SVBIED.
BTR-4	Amphibious Infantry fighting vehicle	3	Ukraine		3 vehicles were seized by IS. 2 were captured from Iraqi Forces around October 2016 after IS conducted an offensive to retake the town of Ar-Rutbah where they were driven out. The other one was captured at an unknown location and date.
Type 69-II	Main battle tank	17	China		Captured in Iraq.
Leopard 2A4	Main battle tank	At least 2	West Germany		Captured from Turkey in the Battle of al-Bab during Euphrates Shield; Amaq News Agency posted video of captured 2A4s.
M1A1	Main battle tank	At least 10	United States		captured from Iraqi Army during their retreat in the Battle of Ramadi (2014–2015).
Eagle	Main battle tank	None, all destroyed or captured.	Nigeria		Captured from the Nigerian Army by Boko Haram.
MT-LB	Amphibious Armoured personnel carrier	unknown	Soviet Union		
BRDM-2	Amphibious Scout car	6	Soviet Union		
MRAP	Infantry mobility vehicle	13	United States		Captured from the Iraqi Army and Police.
M113 APC	Armoured personnel carrier	52	United States		Captured from the Iraqi and the Egyptian Army. Some converted to SVBIED.
Mowag Piranha	Armoured personnel carrier	At least 2	Switzerland		Operated by Boko Haram, probably captured from the Nigerian Army.
Saurer 4K 4FA	Armoured personnel carrier		Austria		Operated by Boko Haram, probably captured from the Nigerian Army.
Panhard AML-60	Armored car		France		Operated by Boko Haram, probably captured from the Nigerian Army.
VBL	Scout car		France		Operated by Boko Haram, probably captured from the Nigerian army.
T-55/55MV/AM/AMV	Main battle tank	At least 82 (2015)	Soviet Union		Captured from the Iraqi Army, Syrian Army and Libyan militias. Many destroyed or captured. Some converted to SVBIED.
T-62 Obr. 1967/Obr. 1972	Main battle tank	15 (2015)	Soviet Union		Possibly captured from Syrian Army, one destroyed near Kobani, another with reinforced turret knocked out near Ma'adan.
T-72/72M/A/AV /TURMS-T/M1 TURMS-T	Main battle tank	22 (2015)	Soviet Union		Possibly captured from the Syrian Army.

=== Self-propelled artillery ===
Name	Type	Quantity	Origin	Photo	Notes
2S1 Gvozdika	Self-propelled artillery	3-4	Soviet Union		Captured from Syrian army.
ZSU-23-4 Shilka	Self-propelled anti-aircraft gun	2	Soviet Union		Captured from the Syrian army.
BM-21 Grad	Multiple rocket launcher	11	Soviet Union		Captured from Syrian army.

=== Aircraft ===
Name	Type	Quantity	Origin	Photo	Notes
L-39ZA	Jet trainer/Ground-attack aircraft	3 (2 operational, as of 2014)	Czechoslovakia		Originally four. Captured by Jaysh al-Islam at the Jirah airfield on 12 February 2013. One was subsequently destroyed during a SAAF bombing. Two were repaired to airworthiness and shown taxiing during a propaganda video released by Jaysh al-Islam. Project abandoned upon the airfield's capture by IS.
MiG-21	Interceptor aircraft	7 (unknown amount operational, as of 2014)	USSR		Some Mig-21 and Mig-23 jets were captured at the Jirah airfield on 30 August 2012. Flown by ex Iraqi pilots and were operated from the Jirah airfield.
MiG-23	Interceptor aircraft	Unknown	USSR		Some Mig-21 and Mig-23 jets were captured at the Jirah airfield on 30 August 2012. Flown by ex Iraqi pilots and were operated from the Jirah airfield.
Sikorsky UH-60 Black Hawk	Helicoptor	Unknown	United States		Some Sikorsky UH-60 Black Hawk fell under the control of IS.
Commercial civilian drones	Unmanned aerial vehicle	Many	Unknown		Some were captured from the Syrian Army and Iran. IS demonstrated the use of a reconnaissance drone in "Clanking of the Swords IV" (June 2014) and in October 2014 over Kobanî in the John Cantlie video and the Tabqah Air Base video. The three drones in Syria were shot down over Kobanî by Kurdish forces defending the city, and by the Syrian Army over an airbase.
Improvised bombing and surveillance drones (mostly quadcopters)	Unmanned aerial vehicle	80+	Islamic State		Large numbers of originally civilian drones are used by IS, often heavily adapted to be used for bomb attacks, spy missions, propaganda, etc. These drones are mostly controlled by the Al Bara’ bin Malik Brigade, part of the aviation sector of the Islamic State’s Committee for Military Manufacturing and Development.

=== Watercraft ===
IS has been using a mix of watercraft to transport fighters around the Tigris River and Euphrates River and has been referred to as their unofficial riverine navy. US forces have come across small watercraft that can ply rivers to carry troops, equipment and in some cases act as floating IEDs.

- Barges for transport.
- Skiffs.
- Motorized vessels.

== Weapons production ==
IS has an indigenous weapons industry. Their workshops can produce identical copies of the RPG-7 and SPG-9. In addition, they have developed an indigenous rocket launcher, which comes in four varieties. Two variants fire PG-9 munitions at short and long range. A third fires PG-7V munitions and the fourth fires an unspecified thermobaric munition. They also produce grenades to be fired from the muzzle of an AK pattern rifle or dropped from a drone. They also produce mortar ammunition and rockets.

== See also ==
- List of military equipment of Hezbollah
- List of equipment of the Syrian Army
- List of military equipment used by Syrian Democratic Forces
- List of military equipment used by Syrian opposition forces

== Bibliography ==
- Iraq: Taking stock: The arming of Islamic State (PDF) (Report). Amnesty International. 7 December 2015. Archived from the original (PDF) on 20 May 2022.
- International Institute for Strategic Studies (9 February 2016). The Military Balance 2016. Routledge. ISBN 978-1-85743-835-2.
- Weapons of the Islamic State – A three-year investigation in Iraq and Syria (PDF) (Report). London: Conflict Armament Research. December 2017.
- Islamic State Weapons in High-Profile Operations in North-East Syria (Report). London: Conflict Armament Research. January 2024.
