= List of military equipment used by Syrian opposition forces =

This is a list of military equipment used by Syrian opposition forces in the Syrian Civil War. This list does not include equipment used by the Islamic State of Iraq and the Levant and the Syrian Democratic Forces.

== Sources ==
Large pieces of equipment like tanks and vehicles are generally captured from the Syrian Army, but small arms are a mixture of captured Syrian Army weapons, weapons imported by foreign combatants joining the opposition forces, or other sources. These include funding by private donors (notably from the Gulf region) and equipment supplied by friendly nations like Turkey.

The U.S. supplied a considerable amount of weapons and ammunition, of both American and Soviet-type from Eastern Europe, to Syrian rebel groups under operation Timber Sycamore. For example, Jane's Defence Weekly reported that in December 2015 the U.S. shipped 994 tonnes of weapons and ammunition (including packaging and container weight) to Syrian opposition fighters, mainly being to the Free Syrian Army.

== Small arms ==
Model	Image	Caliber	Type	Origin	Details
Pistols
TT-33		7.62×25mm Tokarev	Recoil operated Semi-automatic pistol	Soviet Union	Commonly used by rebels, captured from the Syrian Arab Army.
Makarov PM		9×18mm Makarov	Blowback Semi-automatic pistol	Soviet Union	Commonly used by rebels, captured from the Syrian Arab Army. It is often seen with black grips instead of the reddish-brown one.
Browning Hi-Power		9×19mm Parabellum	Recoil operated tilting barrel Semi-automatic pistol	Belgium; United States	Apparent popular pistol in Syria.
SIG P226		9×19mm Parabellum 7.65mm Parabellum 9×21mm IMI .357 SIG .40 S&W	Recoil operated DA/SA Semi-automatic pistol	West Germany; Switzerland	Seen in a video of Al-Jazeera where former members of the Ba'athist Syrian regime were surrendering their weapons.
M1911		.45 ACP	Short-Recoil-Operated Semi-automatic pistol	United States	Previously it has been seen and used rarely but has in recent times appeared more often.
Walther PPK		9×18mm Ultra.22 Long Rifle .25 ACP .32 ACP .380 ACP	Straight-Blowback Semi-automatic pistol	Weimar Republic; Nazi Germany West Germany; Germany	Seen in a video of Al-Jazeera where surrendering Ba'athist Syrian troops were handing over their weapons.
Rifles and Carbines
Mosin–Nagant		7.62×54mmR	Bolt-action rifle	Soviet Union	Seen common service by snipers, who usually put modern optics on it. The Mosin Nagant 1891/30 variant is used most but the M1944 (or Bulgarian 91/59 mosin nagant) carbine are also used, though to a lesser extent.
MAS-36		7.5×54mm French	Bolt-action rifle	French Third Republic	Seen moderate usage by snipers through 2013–2014 in Aleppo when in July 2013, the FSA (probably the 16th Division or some other branch of the FSA. 16th Division did use MAS-36s.) captured large amounts of stockpiled MAS-36s from the Syrian Arab Army. Other rebel groups such as the Al-Tawhid Brigade also captured and used large amounts of MAS-36s captured from the Syrian Arab Army. Most rebel groups stopped using the MAS-36 around 2015, probably because the ammo ran out.
Karabiner 98k		7.92×57mm	Bolt-action rifle	Nazi Germany	
SKS		7.62×39mm	Semi-automatic rifle	Soviet Union	Somewhat uncommon usage. Usually when it is used, it is seen being used by marksmen attached with optics.
Heckler & Koch G3		7.62×51mm NATO	Battle rifle	West Germany; Turkey	Sourced from Turkey and Saudi Arabia. Used as a DMR. Used very rarely.
FN FAL		7.62×51mm NATO	Battle rifle	Belgium	Often used as Marksman Rifle and Operations Specialist Weapon, sourced from Libya and UAE.
MK14 EBR		7.62×51mm NATO	Battle rifle	United States	Rarely seen by the Free Syrian Army's Division 30
Assault rifles and Carbines
StG 44		7.92×33mm Kurz	Assault rifle	Nazi Germany	On 8 August 2012, the FSA captured around 5,000 from a Syrian Arab Army storage container.
AK-47		7.62×39mm	Assault rifle	Soviet Union	Isn't the most common gun in the war, but is used. The AKS-47 variant is also used.
AKM		7.62×39mm	Assault rifle	Soviet Union	One of the most common weapons used by Syrian rebels. The AKMS version is more often seen than the AKM.
Type 56		7.62×39mm	Assault rifle	China	Chinese variant of the Russian AK-47 and AKM. The Type-56 has been seen in use by various rebel groups. The Type-56-1 and Type-56-2 are also seen.
Zastava M70		7.62×39mm	Assault rifle	Yugoslavia	Yugoslavian variant of the Russian AK-47 and AKM.
PM md. 63		7.62×39mm	Assault rifle	Socialist Republic of Romania	Used commonly in the early part of the war. Isn't seen too commonly now.
AMD 65		7.62×39mm	Assault rifle	(Hungary) Hungarian People's Republic	Has seen occasional use in both the beginning and the end of the fall of the Assad regieme.
vz. 58		7.62×39mm	Assault rifle	Czechoslovak Socialist Republic	In 2016, the Czech Republic donated 6,600 vz. 58 assault rifles to Iraqi and Kurdish regional governments to aid in the fight against the Islamic State of Iraq and Syria.
AK-74; AKS-74		5.45×39mm	Assault rifle	Soviet Union	Mostly used by opposition special forces and elite units. Isn't too common elsewhere.
AK-74M		5.45×39mm	Assault rifle	Russia	Unknown quantity, captured during the Syrian Civil War.
AK-103		7.62×39mm	Assault rifle	Russia	Unknown quantity, captured during the Syrian Civil War.
AK-105		5.45×39mm	Assault rifle	Russia	Seen in a video of Al-Jazeera where former members of the Syrian regime were surrendering their weapons.
MPi KM-72		7.62×39mm	Assault rifle	East Germany	Possibly weapons from the PLO
MPi KMs-72		7.62×39mm	Assault rifle	East Germany	Possibly weapons from the PLO
AK-9		9×39mm	Assault rifle	Russia	Unknown quantity, captured during the Syrian Civil War.
FB Tantal		5.45×39mm	Assault rifle	Poland	Unknown quantity, captured during the Syrian Civil War.
M16A1; M16A2		5.56×45mm NATO	Assault rifle	United States	Used by Division 30, the New Syrian Army, Al-Moutasem Brigade and Euphrates Shield rebels. The M16A1 was used commonly as a marksman rifle in the early parts of the war.
M4		5.56×45mm NATO	Carbine	United States	Really, really rare. Used in the late stages of the Civil War.
Norinco CQ		5.56×45mm NATO	Assault rifle	China	"Where they are coming from is not certain. Iran is known to have purchased CQ rifles and produce it under license, but rifles similar to those seen in the Middle East have been seen and manufactured under license in Sudan, the National Interest report said." said by the Asia times.
FAMAS		5.56×45mm NATO	Assault rifle	France	Seen once in 2013, possibly smuggled out of Lebanon.
Steyr AUG		5.56×45mm NATO	Assault rifle	Austria	Origin unclear; serial numbers removed. Used by Syrian Opposition special forces. Sometimes used by Syrian rebels as a marksman rifle.
IMI Galil		5.56×45mm NATO	Assault rifle	Israel	Limited usage.
Sniper rifles and anti-material rifles
Steyr SSG 69		7.62×51mm NATO	Sniper rifle	Austria	Is a common bolt-action rifle used by Syrian rebels.
Dragunov SVD		7.62×54mmR	Designated marksman rifle	Soviet Union	The most common sniper rifle in the war.
Zastava M91		7.62×54mmR	Designated marksman rifle	Yugoslavia	
PSL		7.62×54mmR; 7.62×51mm NATO	Designated marksman rifle	Socialist Republic of Romania	
OSV-96		12.7×108mm	Anti-materiel rifle	Russia	
M99	N/A	12.7×108mm	Anti-materiel rifle	China	Supplied by Qatar. Is one of the most common anti-material rifles used by Syrian rebels.
Sayad-2		.50 BMG	Anti-materiel rifle	Austria; Iran	Unlicensed Iranian produced copy of the Steyr HS .50. Captured from the Syrian Army.
PTRS-41		14.5×114mm	Anti-tank rifle	Soviet Union	Used by rebels as an anti-material rifle . Has seen very limited use.
Submachine guns
Sterling submachine gun		9×19mm Parabellum	Submachine gun	United Kingdom	Rare. Some possibly originate from Iraq and were captured from SAA forces.
Sten		9×19mm Parabellum	Submachine gun	United Kingdom	Possibly leftover from the 1948 Arab-Israeli War.
Sa vz. 23		7.62×25mm Tokarev	Submachine gun	Czechoslovak Socialist Republic	
MAB 38		9×19mm Parabellum	Submachine gun	Kingdom of Italy	Only one has been seen in the war. As of 2017.
MP-40		9×19mm Parabellum	Submachine gun	Nazi Germany	"Few MP-40s have been seen during the Syrian civil war, and of those that have, they appeared a year or two into the conflict.” “The Saudi-Croatian deal is one possibility” “as is Libya, which had bought some WWII-vintage MP-40s from Yugoslavia in the 1980s."
Beretta M12		9×19mm Parabellum	Submachine gun	Italy	
Machine guns
RPD		7.62×39mm	Light machine gun	Soviet Union	Uncommon usage by the 16th Division.
RPK		5.45×39mm	Light machine gun	Soviet Union	Common usage.
PKM		7.62×54mmR	General-purpose machine gun	Soviet Union	
PKP Pecheneg		7.62×54mmR	General-purpose machine gun	Russia	Unknown quantity, captured during the Syrian Civil War.
MG-34		7.92×57mm Mauser	General-purpose machine gun	Nazi Germany	Captured from some Syrian stockpiles. Very rare usage but was one of the FSA's first machine guns looted from Syrian army warehouses.
M240B		7.62×51mm NATO	General-purpose machine gun	United States	Used by the SNA and Al-Moutasem Brigade and Euphrates Shield forces.
FN MAG		7.62×51mm	General-purpose machine gun	Belgium	
Ksp 58		7.62×51mm	General-purpose machine gun	Belgium; Sweden	
DShK; Type 54 HMG		12.7×108mm	Heavy machine gun	Soviet Union; China	Often mounted on technicals. Sometimes is planted in holes in walls or on flat surfaces when in lack of a tripod. Chinese copy of DShK.
NSV Coyote M02		12.7×108mm	Heavy machine gun	Soviet Union	Often seen being used behind cover mounted on a wall, jersey barrier or on some kind of improvised bipod.
W85		12.7×108mm	Heavy machine gun	China	Used very commonly. Sometimes is planted in holes in walls or on flat surfaces when in lack of a tripod.
KPV		14.5×114mm	Heavy machine gun	Soviet Union	Often mounted on technicals.
M2 Browning		12.7×99mm NATO	Heavy machine gun	United States	Used by US-backed FSA groups, including the al-Mu'tasim Brigade and the Hamza Division.
M1919 Browning		.30-06 Springfield	Medium machine gun	United States	Seen at least once in the war. It's possible it was taken off a disabled Israeli vehicle during the Yom Kippur War or the 1980s fighting in Lebanon.
Vickers machine gun		.303 British	Heavy machine gun	British Empire	Seen at least once in the war. May or may not be usable.

== Grenades, grenade launchers and explosives ==
Model	Image	Diameter	Type	Origin	Details
F1		55 mm	Hand grenade	Soviet Union	The most common grenade used by the Free Syrian Army and other rebel groups.
Mk 2 grenade		59 mm	Hand grenade	United States	
M26 grenade		57 mm	Hand grenade	United States	
RGD-5		58 mm	Hand grenade	Soviet Union	The second most common grenade.
OHG-92		65mm	Hand grenade	Switzerland	Grenades originally delivered to the United Arab Emirates in 2003–2004 and then given to Jordan in 2004. Unclear how the hand grenades reached the Syrian rebels.
AGS-17		30×29mm grenade	Automatic grenade launcher	Soviet Union	
Mark 19 grenade launcher		40×53mm grenade	Automatic grenade launcher	United States	Supplied by the United States.
RBG-6		40×46mm grenade	Grenade launcher	Croatia	Croatian-produced copy of South African Milkor MGL. Supplied by Saudi Arabia.
Arsenal MSGL		40×46mm grenade	Grenade launcher	Bulgaria	
FN 303		18 mm	Riot gun	Belgium	Used by Free Syrian Police.
IED			Improvised explosive device	(Syria) Syrian opposition / Hayat Tahrir al-Sham	
Molotov cocktail			Improvised Incendiary device	(Syria) Syrian opposition / Hayat Tahrir al-Sham	

== Anti-tank weapons ==
Model	Image	Diameter	Type	Origin	Details
Shoulder-fired missiles
SPG-82		82 mm	Anti-tank rocket launcher	Soviet Union	
RPG-2		82 mm	Recoilless gun	Soviet Union	Although the 104th Brigade of the Syrian Republican Guard had used them,
RPG-7		40 mm (launcher only, warhead diameter varies)	Rocket-propelled grenade	Soviet Union	Very common, the most common anti-tank gun in Syria.
RPG-18		64 mm	Rocket-propelled grenade	Soviet Union	
RPG-22		72.5 mm	Rocket-propelled grenade	Soviet Union	Supplied by Saudi Arabia.
RPG-26		72.5 mm	Rocket-propelled grenade	Soviet Union	
RPG-29		105 mm	Rocket-propelled grenade	Soviet Union	
RPG-75		68 mm	Rocket-propelled grenade	Czechoslovak Socialist Republic	
M72 LAW		66 mm	Anti-tank rocket launcher	United States	Turkish HAR-66 (LAW copy) supplied by Turkey
M79 Osa		90 mm	Anti-tank rocket launcher	Yugoslavia	Supplied by Saudi Arabia.
RBR-120 mm M90		120 mm	Anti-tank rocket launcher	Serbia / Macedonia	
Anti-tank guided weapons
9M14 Malyutka		125 mm	Wire-guided anti-tank missile	Soviet Union	Designated AT-3 Sagger by NATO.
9K111 Fagot		120 mm	Wire-guided anti-tank missile	Soviet Union	Designated AT-4 Spigot by NATO.
9M113 Konkurs		135 mm	Wire-guided anti-tank missile	Soviet Union	Captured from the Syrian Army and supplied by Saudi Arabia. Designated AT-5 Spandrel by NATO.
9K115 Metis		130 mm	Wire-guided anti-tank missile	Soviet Union	Designated AT-7 Spriggan by NATO.
9K115-2 Metis-M		130 mm	Wire-guided anti-tank missile	Russia	Designated AT-13 Saxhorn-2 by NATO.
9M133 Kornet		152 mm	Wire-guided anti-tank missile	Russia	Designated AT-14 Spriggan by NATO.
HJ-8		120 mm	Wire-guided anti-tank missile	China	Supplied by Qatar from Sudan.
MILAN		115 mm	Wire-guided anti-tank missile	France / West Germany	Captured from the Syrian Army and YPG. Some supplied by Qatar or from Libyan National Army stocks.
BGM-71 TOW		152 mm	Wire-guided anti-tank missile	United States	Allegedly supplied by the U.S., but origin remains "unclear"; serial numbers removed. The TOW missile system has seen extensive use during the Hama Offensive by Syrian opposition forces, mainly against armoured vehicles from both the SAA and NDF.

== Anti-aircraft weapons ==
Model	Image	Diameter	Type	Origin	Details
Towed anti-aircraft guns
ZU-23-2		23 mm	Anti-aircraft Autocannon	Soviet Union	Often mounted on technicals.
37 mm automatic air defense gun M1939 (61-K)		37 mm	Anti-aircraft Autocannon	Soviet Union	Mounted on technicals.
57 mm AZP S-60		57 mm	Anti-aircraft Autocannon	Soviet Union	
ZPU		14.5×114mm	Anti-aircraft gun	Soviet Union	Based on the Soviet 14.5 mm KPV heavy machine gun. Often mounted on technicals.
ZPU-4		14.5×114mm	Anti-aircraft gun	Soviet Union	Mostly mounted on technicals.
ZPU-1		14.5×114mm	Anti-aircraft gun	Soviet Union	Mounted on technicals.
Self-propelled air defense
ZSU-23-4 "Shilka"		23 mm	Self-propelled anti-aircraft gun	Soviet Union	Often used against ground targets in urban environments.
9K33 Osa		209.6 mm 9M33 missile	Amphibious SAM system	Soviet Union	Two captured from the Syrian Armed Forces and used by Jaysh al-Islam and Jaysh al-Ahrar.
Man-portable air-defense systems
FN-6		72 mm	Man-portable air-defense system	China	Supplied by Qatar.
9K32 Strela-2		72 mm	Man-portable air-defense system	Soviet Union	Designated SA-7 Grail by NATO.
9K310 Igla-1		72 mm	Man-portable air-defense system	Soviet Union	Designated SA-16 Gimlet by NATO.
9K338 Igla-S		72 mm	Man-portable air-defense system	Soviet Union	Designated SA-24 Grinch by NATO.
FIM-92 Stinger		100 mm	Man-portable air-defense system	United States	Turkey reportedly helped to transport to a limited amount of FIM-92 Stingers to the Free Syrian Army

== Artillery and mortars ==
Model	Image	Caliber	Type	Origin	Details
Mortars
82-BM-37		82 mm	Infantry mortar	Soviet Union	
2B9M Vasilek		82 mm	Gun-mortar	Soviet Union	Possible Chinese copy (W99). At least one in use by Ansar al-Sham. Unclear origin. Also being used by Syrian Turkmen Brigade.
M1938 mortar		120 mm	Infantry mortar	Soviet Union	
120-PM-43 mortar		120 mm	Infantry mortar	Soviet Union	
Soltam K6		120 mm	Infantry mortar	Israel	
Improvised mortars	N/A	Various	Improvised mortar	(Syria) Syrian opposition / Hayat Tahrir al-Sham	
Field artillery
10.5 cm leFH 18M		105 mm	Howitzer	Nazi Germany	Probably looted from Syrian Army warehouses or from museums, according to N.R. Jenzen-Jones.
122 mm howitzer M1938 (M-30)		122mm	Howitzer	Soviet Union	Captured during Ramouseh Artillery Base assault by Jaish al Fateh
D-30		122 mm	Howitzer	Soviet Union	Captured from the Syrian Army
"Hell cannon"		Various	Improvised artillery	(Syria) Syrian opposition	Improvised howitzer that fires propane gas cylinders. Originated with the Ahrar al-Shamal Brigades, now used widely.
M-46		130 mm	Field gun	Soviet Union	
180 mm gun S-23		180mm	Heavy gun	Soviet Union	Captured during Ramouseh Artillery Base assault by Jaish al Fateh
152 mm howitzer 2A65		152mm	Howitzer	Soviet Union	
Self-propelled artillery
2S1 Gvozdika		122 mm	Self propelled howitzer	Soviet Union	Armed with D-30 howitzer.
2S3 Akatsiya		152.4 mm	Self propelled howitzer	Soviet Union	Armed with D-22 howitzer.
Recoilless rifles
B-10 Type 65		82 mm	Recoilless rifle	Soviet Union China	Chinese copy of B-10.
M60			Recoilless rifle	Yugoslavia	Supplied by Saudi Arabia.
M40		105 mm	Recoilless rifle	United States	Possible Iranian copy.
Carl Gustav 84mm		84 mm	Recoilless rifle	Sweden	
SPG-9		73 mm	Recoilless rifle	Soviet Union	
Rocket artillery
Type 63		106.7 mm	Multiple rocket launcher	China	Possible Iranian copy.
RAK-12		128 mm	Multiple rocket launcher	Croatia	Croatian built version of Yugoslavian M-63 Plamen with 12 rockets tubes instead of the original 32. Supplied by Saudi Arabia.
Katyusha	N/A		Multiple rocket launcher	Soviet Union	
BM-21 Grad		122 mm	Multiple rocket launcher	Soviet Union	Initially captured from the Syrian Army, later supplied by Saudi Arabia from Bulgaria and Poland.
Grad-P		122 mm	Light portable rocket system	Soviet Union	
Improvised rocket launchers		Various	Improvised Rocket launcher	(Syria) Syrian opposition / Hayat Tahrir al-Sham	

== Tanks and armoured vehicles ==
Model	Image	Type	Origin	Details
T-54		Medium tank Main battle tank	Soviet Union	Captured from the Syrian Army, at least one operated by the al-Tawhid Brigade and the Conquest Brigade as of September 2013.
T-55		Medium tank Main battle tank	Soviet Union	Captured from the Syrian Army.
T-62		Main battle tank	Soviet Union	Captured from the Syrian Army. One of the most used tanks used by Syrian rebels.
T-72		Main battle tank	Soviet Union	Captured from the Syrian Army. At least 8 previously operated by Jaysh al-Islam. Liwa Dawood had another 6, then captured by ISIL. Total numbers currently unknown
T-90		Main battle tank	Russia	1 operated by Harakat Nour al-Din al-Zenki, captured from the Syrian Army.
BMP-1		Infantry fighting vehicle	Soviet Union	Captured from the Syrian Army.
BVP-1 AMB-S		Military ambulance	Czechoslovak Socialist Republic	Captured from the Syrian Army.
BMP-2		Infantry fighting vehicle	Soviet Union	Two BMP-2s were captured from Syrian Army when FSA overran Aleppo's Infantry School and another was destroyed in the fight for Aleppo's Central Prison.
BTR-60PB		Wheeled amphibious armoured personnel carrier	Soviet Union	Captured from the Syrian Army.
BRDM-2		Amphibious Armoured scout car	Soviet Union	Captured from the Syrian Army.
Humvee		Military light utility vehicle	United States	Some captured from ISIS and YPG/SDF.
Improvised fighting vehicles		Improvised fighting vehicle	(Syria) Syrian opposition	Examples are the Sham 1 armored pickup truck and the Sham 2 armored car used by the Al-Ansar Brigade.
Streit Cougar		Infantry mobility vehicle	Canada	
Streit Typhoon		MRAP	Canada	
Safir		Off-road military light utility vehicle	Iran	
Construction Vehicles		Hitachi, Hidromek, Poclain, Caterpillar, Hyundai, Develon, Bobcat, JCB and Volvo etc.	Various	

== See also ==
- List of military equipment of Hezbollah
- List of military equipment of Islamic State
- List of military equipment used by Syrian Democratic Forces
