= List of military equipment of Hezbollah =

This is a list of some of the military equipment used by the paramilitary wing of Hezbollah.

== Anti aircraft defense ==
Name	Type	Quantity	Acquired from	Origin	Photo	Notes
ZU-23-2	Anti-aircraft gun	Unknown	Lebanon; Syria; Iran	Soviet Union		
AZP S-60	Anti-aircraft gun (towed)	>2+	Lebanon	Soviet Union		
ZSU-23-4	Self-propelled anti-aircraft weapon	Unknown	Syria	Soviet Union		
9K32 strela-2	Man portable surface to air missile	Unknown	Various			Probable stockpile

== Anti ship defense ==
Name	Type	Quantity	Acquired from	Origin	Photo	Notes
C-701	Anti-ship missile	Unknown	Iran	China		
C-802	Anti-ship missile	8+	Iran	China		In 2006, Hezbollah fire a single C-802 at the Israeli ship (INS Hanit), killing 4 sailors.
Yakhont (P-800 Oniks)	Anti-ship missile	Potentially; Up to 12	Syria	Russia; Soviet Union		Delivered 2013

== Anti tank defense ==
Name	Type	Quantity	Acquired from	Origin	Photo	Notes
RPG-7	Rocket-propelled grenade	Unknown	Various	Soviet Union		Including Iranian produced clones
RPG-29	Rocket propelled-grenade	Unknown	Syria	Soviet Union		
RPG-30	Rocket propelled-grenade	Unknown	Syria; Russia	Russia		Possession unconfirmed
Panzerfaust 3	Anti-tank rocket launcher	Extremely limited (if so)	Unknown	West Germany		Unconfirmed
Saegre 2	Anti-tank guided missile	Unknown	Iran	Iran		Iranian M47 Dragon clone
Raad (clone)	Anti-tank guided missile	Unknown	Iran	Iran		Iranian 9M14 Malyutka clone
9M14 Malyutka	Anti-tank guided missile	500+	Iran	Soviet Union		
9K111 Fagot	Anti-tank guided missile	50+	Syria	Soviet Union		
9M113 Konkurs	Anti-tank guided missile	50+	Syria; Iran	Soviet Union		
9K115-2 Metis-M	Anti-tank guided missile	50+	Syria	Soviet Union		
Towsan-1 (clone)	Anti-tank guided missile	Unknown	Iran	Iran		Iranian Konkurs clone
9M133 Kornet	Anti-tank guided missile	50+	Syria	Russia		
BGM-71 TOW	Anti-tank guided missile	10+	Unknown	USA		Possibly via Iran or captured
Toophan (Series) (clone)	Anti-tank guided missile	Unknown	Iran	Iran		Iranian TOW clone
MILAN	Anti-tank guided missile	Unknown	Syria	France		
M40	Recoilless rifle	>1+ (extremely underestimated)	Unknown	USA		30,000 rounds of ammunition in 2008

Hezbollah has apparently thousands of anti-tank guided missiles in total. The group has received many unreported weapon shipments from both Iran and Syria.

== Firearms ==
Name	Type	Quantity	Acquired from	Origin	Photo	Notes
Assault rifles and carbines
AK-47	Assault rifle	Unknown	Various	Soviet Union		Commonly used
AKM	Assault rifle	Unknown	Various	Soviet Union (various)		Commonly used
AK-74	Assault rifle	Unknown	Various	Soviet Union		Commonly used, including the M variants.
Type 56 assault rifle	Assault rifle	Unknown	Iran	People's Republic of China		Commonly used, including the Type 56-2 variant.
M16 rifle	Selective fire assault rifle. Single and three shot burst.	Unknown	Islamic State; FSA; Lebanon	United States		Some likely captured from the Syrian opposition or Islamic State
M4 carbine	Carbine	Unknown	Unknown	United States		Used by Hezbollah Special Forces
Sniper rifles
SKS	Designated marksman rifle/Sniper rifle	Unknown	Unknown	Soviet Union		
Dragunov sniper rifle	Designated marksman rifle	Unknown	Unknown	Soviet Union		
Orsis T-5000	Sniper rifle	Unknown	Unknown	Russia		
Machine guns
PK machine gun	General-purpose machine gun	Unknown	Various	Soviet Union		Commonly used
FN MAG	General-purpose machine gun	Unknown	Unknown	Belgium		
M240	General-purpose machine gun	Unknown	Unknown	Belgium; United States		
M1919 Browning machine gun	Medium machine gun	Unknown	Unknown	United States		

== Land vehicles ==
This category includes tanks, armoured personnel carriers (APC)s, infantry fighting vehicles (IFV)s and other land vehicles.

Name	Type	Quantity	Acquired from	Origin	Photo	Notes
T-55	Main battle tank	Unknown	Syria; South Lebanon Army	Soviet Union		Some captured from SLA
T-62	Main battle tank	Unknown	Syria	Soviet Union		Operating in Syria
T-72	Main battle tank	>60, 1+ T72-AV variant	Syria	Soviet Union		Operating in Syria
T-90	Main battle tank	Unknown	Syria	Russia		Operating in Syria
BMP-1	Infantry fighting vehicle	Unknown	Syria	Soviet Union		Operating in Syria
M113	Armoured personnel carrier	At least 3	Disputed, likely from: South Lebanon Army	USA		Captured in year 2000
BTR-152	Armoured personnel carrier	Unknown	South Lebanon Army	Soviet Union		Some captured from SLA
BTR-50	Armoured personnel carrier	Unknown	South Lebanon Army	Soviet Union		Some captured from SLA
BRDM-2	Armoured scout car	Unknown	South Lebanon Army	Soviet Union		Some captured from SLA
2S1 Gvozdika	Self-propelled howitzer	>3+	Syria	Soviet Union		Operating in Syria
Safir	Military light utility vehicle	"dozens"	Iran	Iran		Operating in Syria
Technicals	Improvised fighting vehicle	100-1000s+	Various	Various		Used widely, some captured from the Syrian opposition and Islamic State of Iraq and the Levant
Civilian and transport vehicles	Mercedes, Volvo, Range Rover, Isuzu, Toyota, Hyundai and Kia etc.	100-1000s+	Various	Various		Used widely

== Rockets and ballistic missiles ==
Name/Model	Diameter	Quantity	Acquired from	Origin	Range	Warhead	Photo	Notes
Type 63	107mm	"dozens"	Iran; Iraq	China	8 km			Includes Iranian Fadjr-1 clones
BM-21 Grad	122mm	Unknown	Russia; China; Syria	Soviet Union	40 km	21 kg		Katyushas from Iran, Russia and China.
BM-27 Uragan	220mm	Unknown	Syria	Soviet Union	40 km	100 kg		
Fajr-3	240mm	>100+	Iran	Iran	43 km	45 kg		Acquired from Iran pre-2006
Falaq-1	240mm	Unknown	Iran	Iran	10 km	50 kg		
Khaibar-1	302mm	Unknown	Unknown	Syria	100 km	175 kg		Apparent cluster munition.
Falaq-2	303mm	Unknown	Iran	Iran	11 km	120 kg		
Fajr-5	333mm	Unknown	Iran (likely)	Iran	75 km	90 kg		
Naze'at	356mm	Unknown	Iran	Iran	130 km			
Zelzal-1	Unknown	Unknown	Iran	Iran	160 km			
Zelzal-2	610mm	Around 500	Iran	Iran	250 km	600 kg		Apparently based on the Soviet FROG-7 missile
Fateh-110	610mm	40-700	Syria	Iran	250 km	650 kg		
Scud		N/A	Syria	Soviet Union	500 km	800 kg		

== Unmanned aerial vehicles ==
The group claims to build their own unmanned aerial vehicles (UAVs), which is disputed, but in any case the designs are copies of Iranian models.

Name	Type	Quantity	Acquired from	Origin	Photo	Notes
Mohajer-4	Unmanned aerial vehicle	Unknown	Iran	Iran		
Ababil-2	Unmanned aerial vehicle	>12	Iran	Iran		2 or 3 apparently shot down by Israel in 2006.
Ababil-3	Unmanned surveillance and reconnaissance aerial vehicle	Unknown	Iran	Iran		
Yasir (clone)	Unmanned aerial vehicle	Unknown	Iran	Iran		Iranian ScanEagle clone
Hud Hud II	Unmanned surveillance and reconnaissance aerial vehicle	Unknown	Iran	Iran		Iranian manufactured UAV announced in Hezbollah's arsenal in 6/17/2024
fpv drone	FPV Unmanned aerial vehicle Loitering munition	hundreds	Iran Lebanon	Iran Russia		Mainly fiber optic drones used extensively by hezbollah in 2026 against israeli targets

== See also ==
- Lebanese Ground Forces Equipment
- Lebanese Armed Forces Out of Service Equipment
- Lebanese Civil War
- Lebanese Air Force aircraft inventory
- List of military equipment of Islamic State
- List of military equipment used by Syrian Democratic Forces
- List of military equipment used by Syrian opposition forces
- List of equipment of the Yemeni Army
- Syrian intervention in Lebanon
- Weapons of the Lebanese Civil War
- 1958 Lebanon crisis
- 1982 Lebanon War
