= Unconventional weapon =

Unconventional weapon may refer to:

- Improvised weapon
- Weapon of mass destruction
- Any weapon not considered to be a conventional weapon
- Weapons used in unconventional warfare
