= List of military equipment used by Syrian Democratic Forces =

The following is a list of military equipment formerly used by the Syrian Democratic Forces (SDF) in the Syrian Civil War. This list does not include equipment used by the Islamic State of Iraq and the Levant and the Syrian opposition.

== Sources ==
The YPG and overall SDF have largely acquired their weaponry from local sources, with small arms being seized from Syrian Army weapons depots or as the result of clashes with other factions. During the war against Islamist groups and the Islamic State, the SDF captured weapons and vehicles which came from other countries, primarily Iraq. Weapons transfers have also taken place between the Syrian Government and the YPG on a small scale, such as at Tel Rifaat. The YPG has received weapons and equipment from the United States in the form of small arms, ammunition, armored vehicles, and medical support, with a large boost delivered for the Raqqa offensive.

== Equipment ==
=== Small arms ===
Name	Country of origin (manufacturer)	Type	Number	Caliber	Notes
Makarov pistol	Soviet Union	Semi-automatic pistol	Thousands	9×18mm	
Browning Hi-Power	Belgium	Semi-automatic pistol	Thousands	9×19mm	
Glock	Austria	Semi-automatic pistol	?	9×19mm	
Beretta M12	Italy	Submachine gun	Thousands	9×19mm	
HK MP5	West Germany	Submachine gun	?	9×19mm	
M4 carbine	United States	Carbine	Thousands	5.56×45mm	
M16 rifle	United States	Assault rifle	Thousands	5.56×45mm	
NEA PDW-CCS 7.5	Canada	Carbine	?	5.56x45mm	
FN FAL	Belgium	Battle rifle	?	7.62×51mm	
Steyr AUG	Austria	Bullpup assault rifle	?	5.56×45mm	
Steyr HS .50	Austria	Anti-materiel sniper rifle	?	12.7×99mm	
Zagros Rifle	Rojava	Anti-materiel rifle	Hundreds	12.7×108mm	Self made anti-materiel rifle
Zijiang M99	China	Anti-materiel rifle	?	12.7×108mm	
AK-47	Soviet Union	Assault rifle	Tens of thousands	7.62×39mm	
AKM	Soviet Union	Assault rifle	Tens of thousands	7.62×39mm	
AKS-74U	Soviet Union	Carbine	?	5.45×39mm	
AK-74	Soviet Union	Assault rifle	?	5.45×39mm	
AK-74M	Russia	Assault rifle	?	5.45×39mm	
AK-103	Russia	Assault rifle	?	7.62×39mm	
AK-104	Russia	Assault rifle	?	7.62×39mm	
Type 56	China	Assault rifle	Tens of thousands	7.62×39mm	
Type 88	North Korea	Assault rifle	?	5.45×39mm	
PM md. 63/65	Socialist Republic of Romania	Assault rifle	Tens of thousands	7.62×39mm	
MPi-KM	East Germany	Assault rifle	Tens of thousands	7.62×39mm	
AK-63	Hungarian People's Republic	Assault rifle	Tens of thousands	7.62×39mm	
AMD 65	Hungarian People's Republic	Assault rifle	Tens of thousands	7.62×39mm	
Kbk wz. 1988 Tantal	Poland	Assault rifle	?	5.45×39mm	
Blaser R93 Tactical	Germany	Sniper rifle	?	7.62×51mm	
Dragunov sniper rifle	Soviet Union	Designated marksman rifle	?	7.62×54mmR	
PSL (rifle)	Socialist Republic of Romania	Designated marksman rifle	?	7.62×54mmR	
Tabuk Sniper Rifle	Ba'athist Iraq	Designated marksman rifle	?	7.62×39mm	
Mosin–Nagant	Russian Empire	Bolt-action rifle	?	7.62×54mmR	
Rheinmetall MG 3	West Germany	General-purpose machine gun	?	7.62×51mm	
FN MAG	Belgium	General-purpose machine gun	?	7.62×51mm	
M249	United States	Light machine gun	?	5.56×45mm	
RPK	Soviet Union	Light machine gun	?	7.62×39mm	
Ultimax 100	Singapore	Light machine gun	?	5.56×45mm	
Zastava M72	Yugoslavia	Light machine gun	?	7.62×39mm	
PK machine gun	Soviet Union	General-purpose machine gun	Hundreds	7.62×54mmR	
Zastava M84	Yugoslavia	General-purpose machine gun	Hundreds	7.62×54mmR	
M2 Browning	United States	Heavy machine gun	?	12.7×99mm	
M1919 Browning machine gun	United States	Medium machine gun	?	7.62×51mm	
DShK	Soviet Union	Heavy machine gun	Hundreds	12.7×108mm	
KPV heavy machine gun	Soviet Union	Heavy machine gun	Hundreds	14.5×114mm	

=== Anti-tank ===
Name	Country of origin	Type	Number	Caliber	Notes
RPG-7	Soviet Union	Rocket-propelled grenade	Thousands	40mm	YPG's RPG are supposed to be of this type
Type 69 RPG	China	Rocket-propelled grenade	Thousands	40mm	
M79 Osa	Yugoslavia	Anti-tank rocket launcher	Few	90mm	
Mk 19	United States	Automatic grenade launcher	?	40×53mm	
RBG-6	Croatia	Grenade launcher	?	40×46mm	
GP-25	Soviet Union	Grenade launcher	?	40 mm	
9K111 Fagot	Soviet Union	Anti-tank missile	?	120mm	
9M113 Konkurs	Soviet Union	Anti-tank missile	?	115mm	
9K115-2 Metis-M	Russia	Anti-tank missile	?	130mm	
M136	United States; Sweden	Anti-tank missile	?	84mm	
BGM-71	United States	Anti-tank missile	?	127mm	
SPG-9	Soviet Union	Recoilless rifle	?	73mm	
IED	Rojava	Improvised explosive device	?	N/a	

=== Artillery ===
Name	Country of origin	Type	Number	Caliber	Notes
122 mm gun M1931/37 (A-19)	Soviet Union	Field gun	3	122mm	
Hell Cannon	Syria	Improvised artillery	10	Various	Captured from Free Syrian Army

=== Armored vehicles ===
Photo	Name	Country of origin	Type	Number	Notes
	T-72	Soviet Union	Main battle tank	4	
	T-62	Soviet Union	Main battle tank	4	Captured from Islamic State of Iraq and the Levant in Tabqa and Al-Hasakah Governorate. At least one is operable.
	T-55	Soviet Union	Main battle tank	10	Captured from the Menagh Military Airbase as well as from various battles with ISIS.
	BRDM-2	Soviet Union	Armoured personnel carrier	5	
	M1117 armored security vehicle	United States	Armoured personnel carrier	3	
	BMP-1	Soviet Union	Infantry fighting vehicle	10	
	MT-LB	Soviet Union	Armoured personnel carrier	7	Captured from Islamic State of Iraq and the Levant. Originally from Iraq.
	BTR-60	Soviet Union	Armoured personnel carrier	2	
	BM-21 Grad	Soviet Union	Multiple rocket launcher	2	
	Type 63 multiple rocket launcher	Soviet Union	Multiple rocket launcher	6	
	ZSU-23-4 Shilka	Soviet Union	Self-propelled anti-aircraft gun	1	Captured from Islamic State of Iraq and the Levant at the Tishrin Dam
	BAE Caiman	United States	MRAP	2	
	Lenco BearCat	United States	MRAP	10	Supplied by the Coalition. Mostly used for internal security.
	International MaxxPro	United States	MRAP	10	Supplied by the Coalition.
	Humvee	United States	Military light utility vehicle	120	20+ received as aid in November 2017. Others captured from Islamic State of Iraq and the Levant, whom likely captured from Iraqi military forces donated by the United States when they left Iraq.

=== Utility vehicles ===
All are pickup trucks which were either modified to hold weapons, or are used to transport troops to battlefields.

Photo	Name	Country of origin	Type	Number	Notes
	Toyota Hilux	Japan	Improvised fighting vehicle, technical	1000+	
	Toyota Land Cruiser	Japan	Improvised fighting vehicle, technical	1000+	Most typically the 70 series family which replaced the 40 series in 1984
	Safir	Iran	Military light utility vehicle	1	

== See also ==
- List of military equipment of ISIS
- List of military equipment used by Syrian opposition forces
