= AZP S-60 =

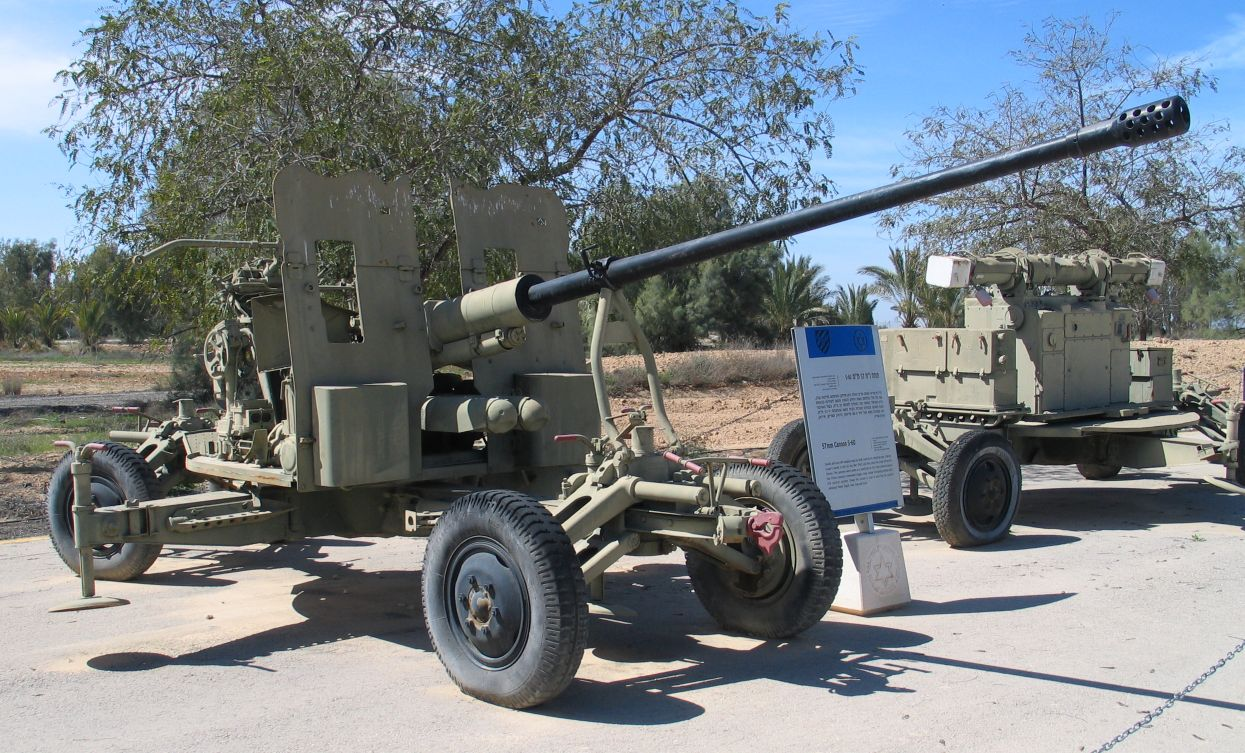
- S-60 in an Israeli museum
- Type: Autocannon
- Place of origin: Soviet Union

Service history
- In service: 1950–present
- Used by: See § Users
- Wars: See § Conflicts

Production history
- Designer: Vasiliy Grabin
- Manufacturer: TsAKB

Specifications
- Mass: 4,660 kg (10,273 lbs)
- Length: 8.5 m (27 ft 11 in)
- Barrel length: 4.4 m (14 ft 5 in)
- Width: 2.054 m (6 ft 9 in)
- Height: 2.37 m (7 ft 9 in)
- Crew: 7
- Shell: Fixed QF 57×347mmSR
- Caliber: 57 mm (2.24 in)
- Action: Recoil operated
- Carriage: Four wheels with outriggers
- Elevation: −4° to +85°
- Traverse: 360°
- Rate of fire: 105–120 rpm (cyclic); 70 rpm (sustained)
- Muzzle velocity: 1,000 m/s (3,281 ft/s)
- Effective firing range: 6,000 m (20,000 ft) (radar guided); 4,000 m (13,000 ft) (optically guided)

AZP S-60 (Russian: Автоматическая зенитная пушка С-60, abbrev. АЗП (AZP); literally: Automatic anti-aircraft gun S-60) is a Soviet towed, road-transportable, short- to medium-range, single-barrel anti-aircraft gun from the 1950s. The gun was extensively used in Warsaw Pact, Middle Eastern and Southeast Asian countries.

== History ==
In the late 1940s, the Soviets started to develop a 57 mm anti-aircraft gun, to replace its 37 mm M1939 guns. Three models were presented, and the winning design was made by V. G. Grabin. According to Western intelligence sources, the German prototype gun 5.5 cm Gerät 58 formed the basis for the design. The Soviets were also able to study earlier German 5 cm FlaK 41 guns that had been captured following the Battle of Stalingrad.

The prototype passed the field tests in 1946 and was accepted into service in 1950, after some minor modifications. The anti-aircraft gun was given the name 57 mm AZP S-60. Grabin continued the development and fielded the SPAAG version ZSU-57-2 in 1955.

The fire direction device was developed from the German Lambda calculator (Kommandogerät 40, 40A, and 40B) and was called PUAZO-5A. It had also a distance measuring device called D-49. The fire direction was also made more effective by including Grom-2 (10 cm wavelength) radars with the Anti-Aircraft batteries. The whole system was called SON-9. Later on, the calculators would be changed into the more modern RPK-1 Vaza, which had been designed by M. M. Kositskin. The calculator and the radars were transported by Ural-375 trucks.

The 57 mm gun replaced the 37 mm divisional guns in Soviet service in the 1950s. A divisional anti-aircraft regiment consisted of two AA-batteries with six 57 mm guns each. The PVO air-defence troops AA regiments consisted of four 57 mm AA batteries (totaling 24 guns).

In the mid-1960s, the Soviet divisional anti-aircraft units began replacing their AA artillery with missiles, and by the end of the 1970s, the AA guns had almost disappeared. However, they were used in many other countries. The performance of AAA (anti-aircraft artillery) in Vietnam against low-flying aircraft led the Soviets to bring back many guns from storage to supplement the Surface-to-Air Missiles, whose performance at low altitude was less than satisfactory.

== Operational history ==
The S-60 and its Chinese copy (the Type 59) have seen combat in several wars all over the world – e.g., the Bajaur Campaign, Six-Day War and the Yom Kippur War in the Middle East, and the Soviet–Afghan War. The Afghan People's Army received twenty-four 57 mm guns in 1958, and deployed it during the Bajaur Campaign. During the Vietnam War, the S-60 was the keystone of North Vietnamese low-altitude air defense and was most effective between 460 meters and 1,500 meters.

In Iraq (Iran–Iraq War, Gulf War and Iraq War), the S-60, normally deployed in battalions of 36 guns, served consistently in defense of divisional headquarters and field artillery assets.

Georgian army air defence units used S-60 guns during the Russo-Georgian War. Some units engaged Russian attack aircraft near the city of Gori. None were shot down by S-60 though some were damaged.

Syrian S-60 guns were actively used during the Syrian Civil War by both the army and rebel groups. As many other guns originally designed for antiaircraft use, most of the time they were used in shelling ground targets.

The Islamic State allegedly shot down a Cessna 208 Caravan operated by the Iraqi Air Force near Hawija, Iraq on 16 March 2016 with a truck-mounted S-60.

In 2022, S-60s were used by Ukraine in the war with Russia not in their original anti-aircraft role but as indirect-fire artillery. In this role they were reported to have an effective range of 6.1km.

In 2023, images surfaced of a T-55 armed with an AZP S-60 Anti Aircraft gun in place of its turret. It has been used by the Luhansk People's Republic to shoot at Ukrainian drones and provide infantry with fire support.

== Ammunition types ==
The S-60 fires ammunition in 57×348SR caliber, with ballistics (see below) similar to the longer 57×438mm ammunition of Bofors 57 mm AA gun, but somewhat weaker than Soviet 57 mm anti-tank guns of World War II. Modern anti-aircraft rounds have not been developed for the gun; the main characteristics of the Soviet-era ammunition are listed in the table below. In addition to these People's Republic of China manufactures ammunition in 57x348SR caliber, designated Type 59 HE-T, Type 59 AP-T, and Type 76 HE-T.

Training rounds include a blank round MK-281 ("Manöver-Kartusche", East German designation), and training rounds with -IN suffix (UBR-281U-IN, UOR-281U-IN) identifying the rounds as fuzeless versions of the APCBC and HE rounds with dummy fuzes and inert filling replacing the explosive cavities.

Designation	Type	Projectile weight [g]	Bursting charge [g]	Muzzle velocity [m/s]	Description
UBR-281/281U	APCBC-HE-T	2,820	13	1,000	Anti-tank round with sharp penetrator, blunt cap and an aerodynamic cover, with tracer and a delayed-action base fuze. Penetration 96 mm RHA at 1,000 m range or 106 mm at 500 m. UBR-281 and -281U are loaded with the same projectile and differ only by details in case mouth and swage grooves.
UOR-281	HE-T	2,850	154	1,000	Impact-fuzed fragmentation shell for anti-aircraft use. Nose fuze with self-destruct function and a tracer.
UOR-281U	HE-T	2,850	154; 168	1,000	Similar to UOR-281; some sources state the shell is the same as in UOR-281 and the round differs from it only in details of the case mouth and swage grooves (as with the UBR round), while others claim a slightly larger HE filling.
3UO6	HE	?	154	1,000	Similar to UOR-281U but with proximity fuze AR-51 installed. Fuze operating with RPK-1 system together. Not to be confused with later smart shells which Russia developed.
Type 59 AP	AP-T	?	?	?	Chinese anti-tank round presumably similar to UBR-281/281U.
Type 59 HE	HE-T	?	?	?	Chinese fragmentation round for anti-aircraft use, presumably similar to UOR-281/281U.
Type 76 HE	HE-T	?	?	?	Chinese fragmentation round.

Airburst munitions for Russian 30 mm and 57 mm autocannons are in development.

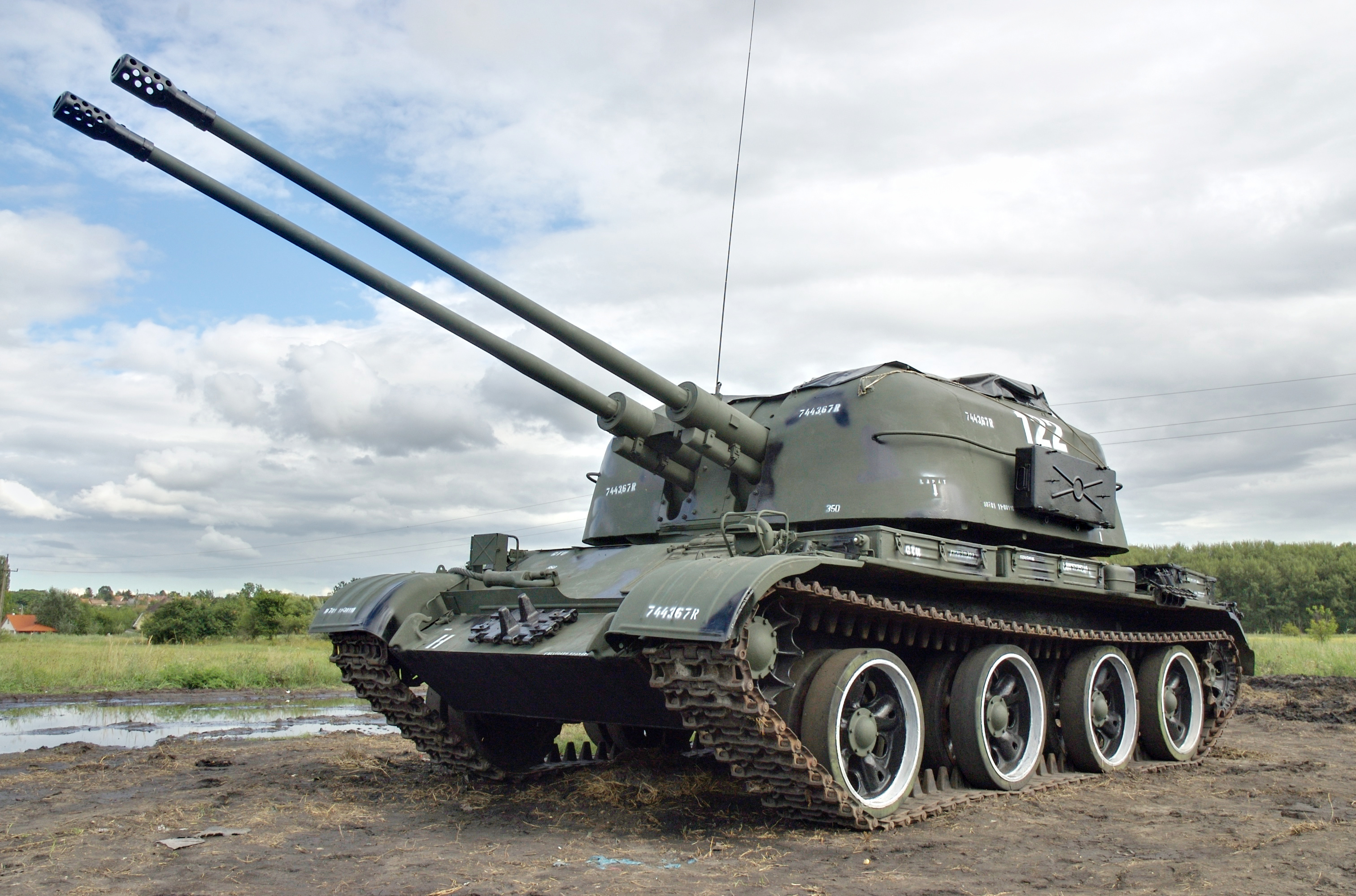
ZSU-57-2

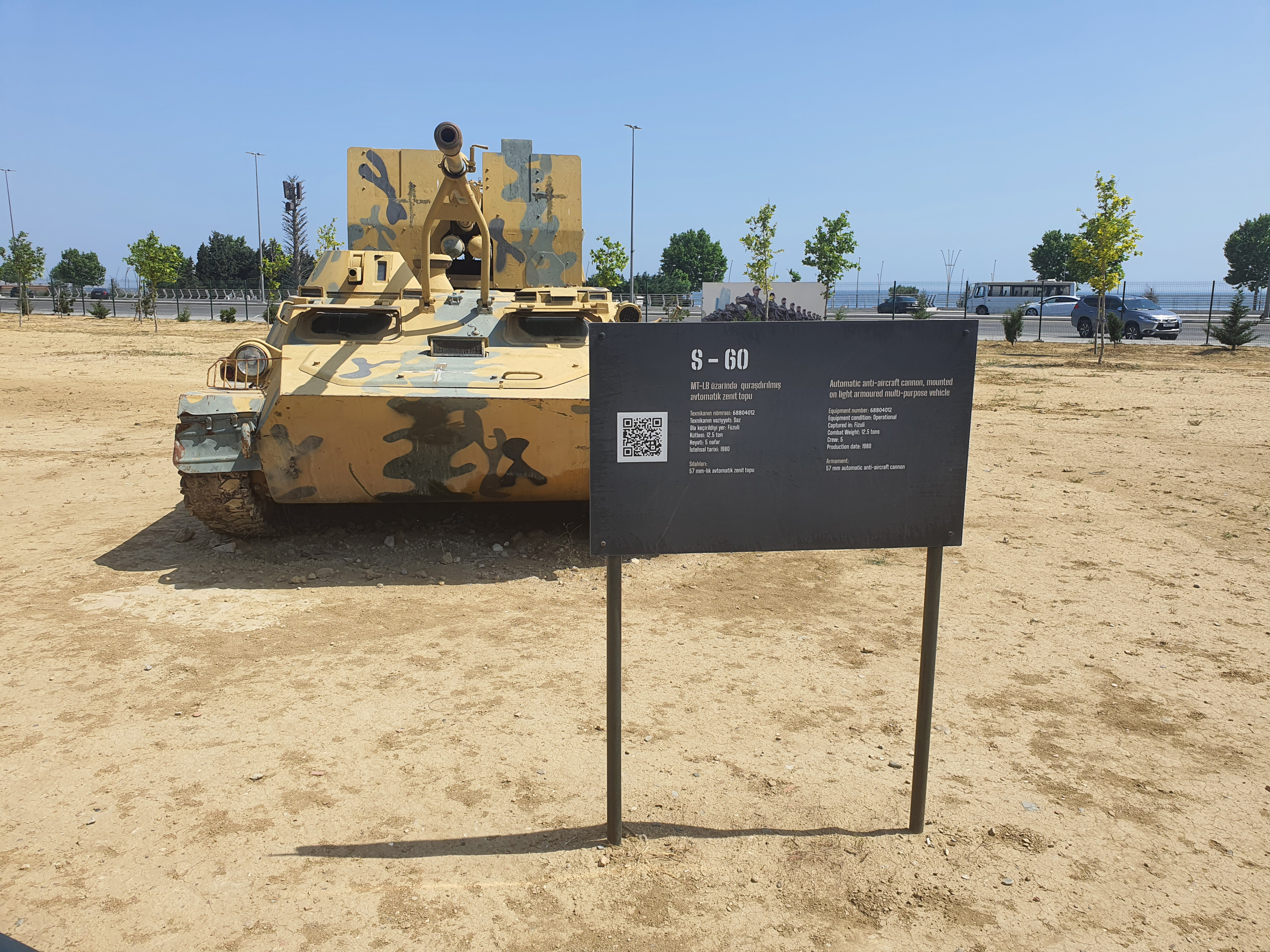
Armenian AZP S-60, mounted on MT-LB, captured in 2020 Nagorno-Karabakh war, can be seen in Military Trophy Park (Baku)

== Versions ==
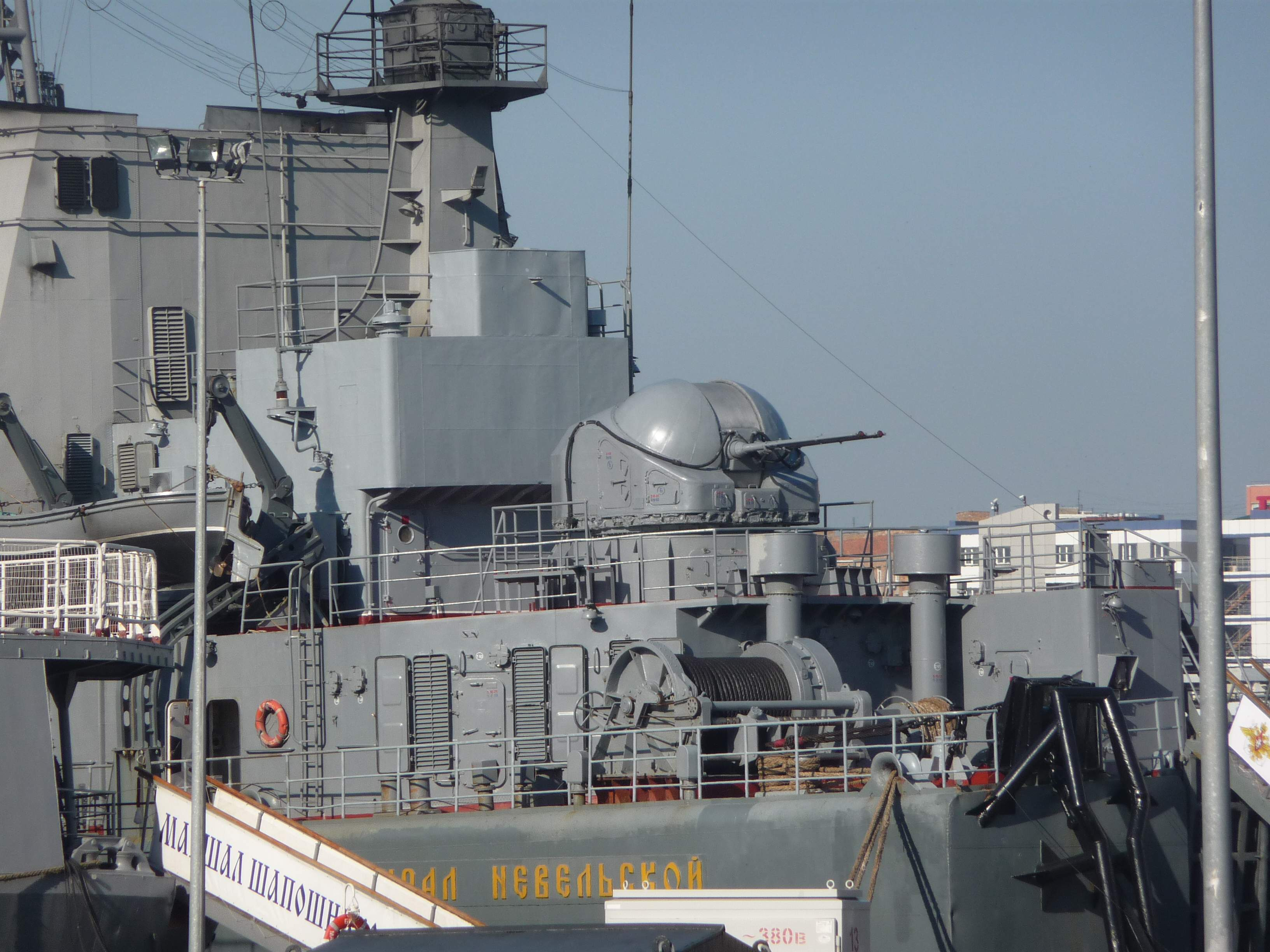
AK-725 (ZIF-72)

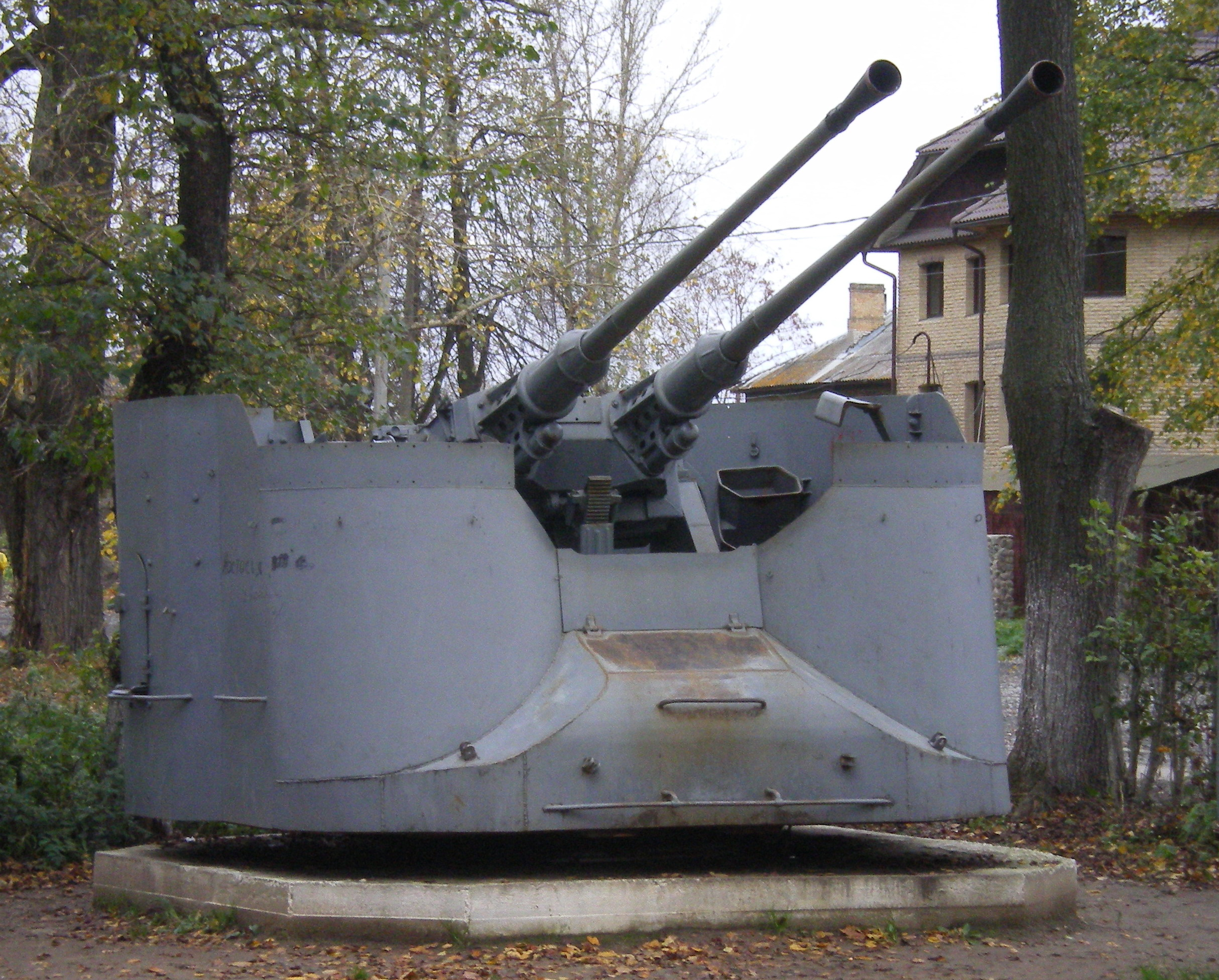
ZIF-31 Naval AA Guns

- AK-725: Naval version of the S-60 gun. Introduced in 1958. Mounted in single, double and quadruple mounts (designated ZIF-31) on many early Soviet destroyers.
- AK-257: a Soviet 57mm naval gun, originally a land ZIF-31 L/70 57mm (Type 66/76) cannon. During the early 1950s, development began of naval versions of the 57x348mmSR 70 calibre weapon which had entered service with the Soviet army in 1950 as the S-60. This was to be a supplementary weapon for larger warships and as the main gun armament for minesweepers and auxiliaries. The twin gun version, ZIF-31, appears to have entered service with the Project 264 Minesweepers (T58 class) and the Project 310 (Don class) submarine support ships in 1958. In 1960, two other versions of the mounting appeared; a single gun ZIF-71 for the modernised Skoryy class destroyers and the quad ZIF-75 for the Krupny/Kanin class destroyers. The ZIF designation is an industrial one and it is possible that the naval designations were AK-157 (ZIF-71), AK-257 (ZIF-31) and AK-457 (ZIF-75). In smaller warships these mountings were sometimes associated with MR-103 and in larger ones with the Yakhond (Hawk Screech) radar. The ZIF-31/71/75 mountings may not have been very successful and an improved twin mounting appeared shortly afterwards as the AK-725. The twin 57mm ZIF-31 has also been manufactured in China as the Type 66 and there is a water-cooled derivative known as the Type 76. The AK-257 is currently employed on the Grisha class Corvette.
- ZIF-72: Naval version which is enclosed in a metal housing and fully automatic. Also exported to India. Introduced in the mid-1970s.
- MT-LB Mounted Version: Self-propelled version, single 57 mm S-60 gun. Used in 2020 Nagorno-Karabakh war. Russian Armed Forces started using this version in Russian invasion of Ukraine.
- ZSU-57-2: Self-propelled version with two 57 mm S-60 guns (designated S-68)
- Type-80: Chinese version of the ZSU-57-2.
- S-60MB: Modernized Polish version, electrically powered, with a digital, automatic guidance system.
- BM-57: Updated version.
  - AU-220M Baikal: Remote weapon station with fire control system using BM-57.
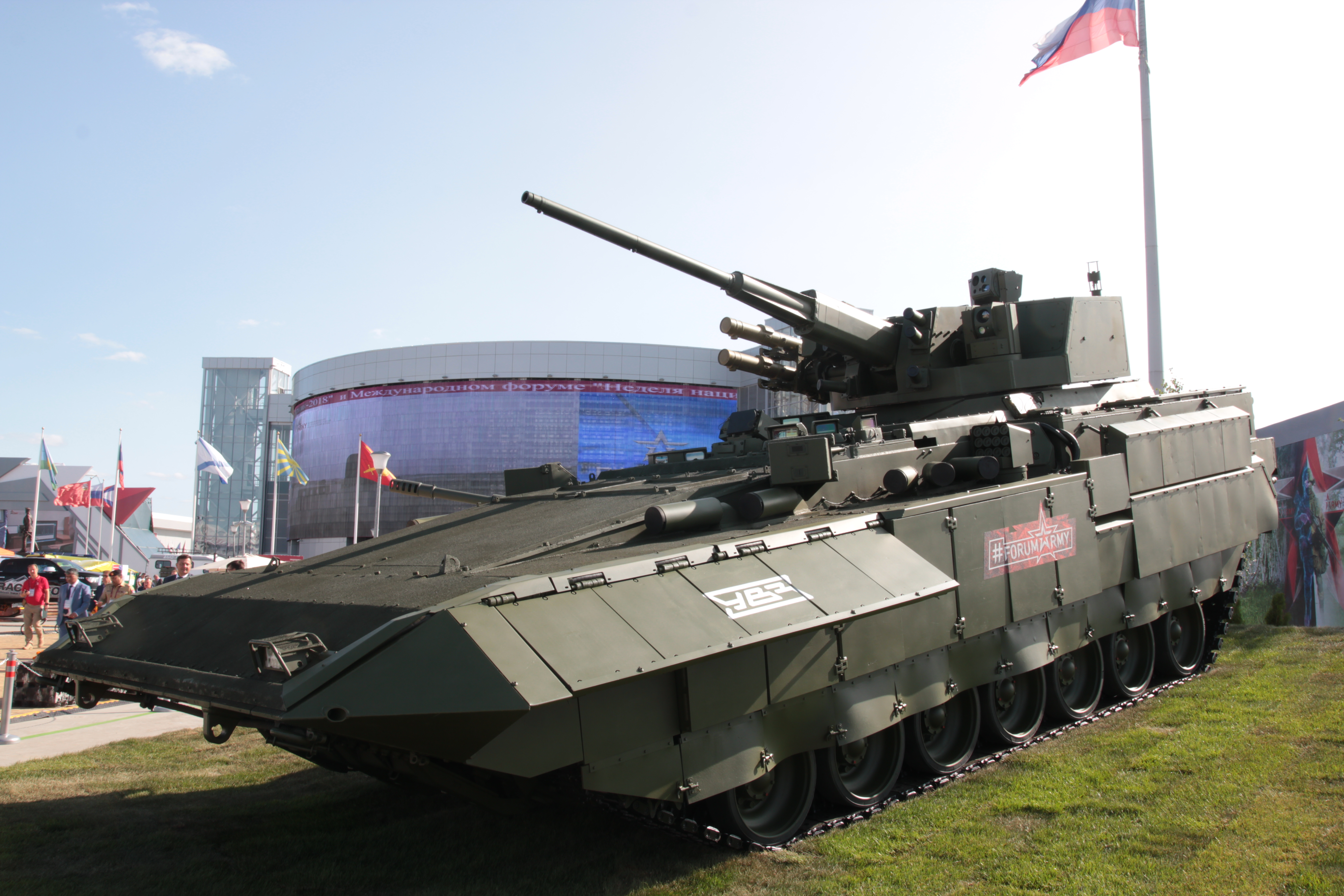
    Russian Army Т-15 with АU-220М RWS armed with 57 mm BM-57 autocannon
- VPK-57: Modernized and upgraded Vietnamese version, made by Viettel . It features an AESA radar fire control, AI-driven ballistic computing, EO/IR sensor suites, and servo-motor automation for remote operations, and an electrically powered, with a digital, automatic guidance system.

== Users ==
The S-60 was sold to at least 37 countries during the Soviet era. The gun was also license manufactured in Poland by Zakłady Mechaniczne Tarnów in Tarnów (en. Tarnów Mechanical Works), and in Hungary by DIMÁVAG in Miskolc-Diósgyőr, and in China as the Type 59.

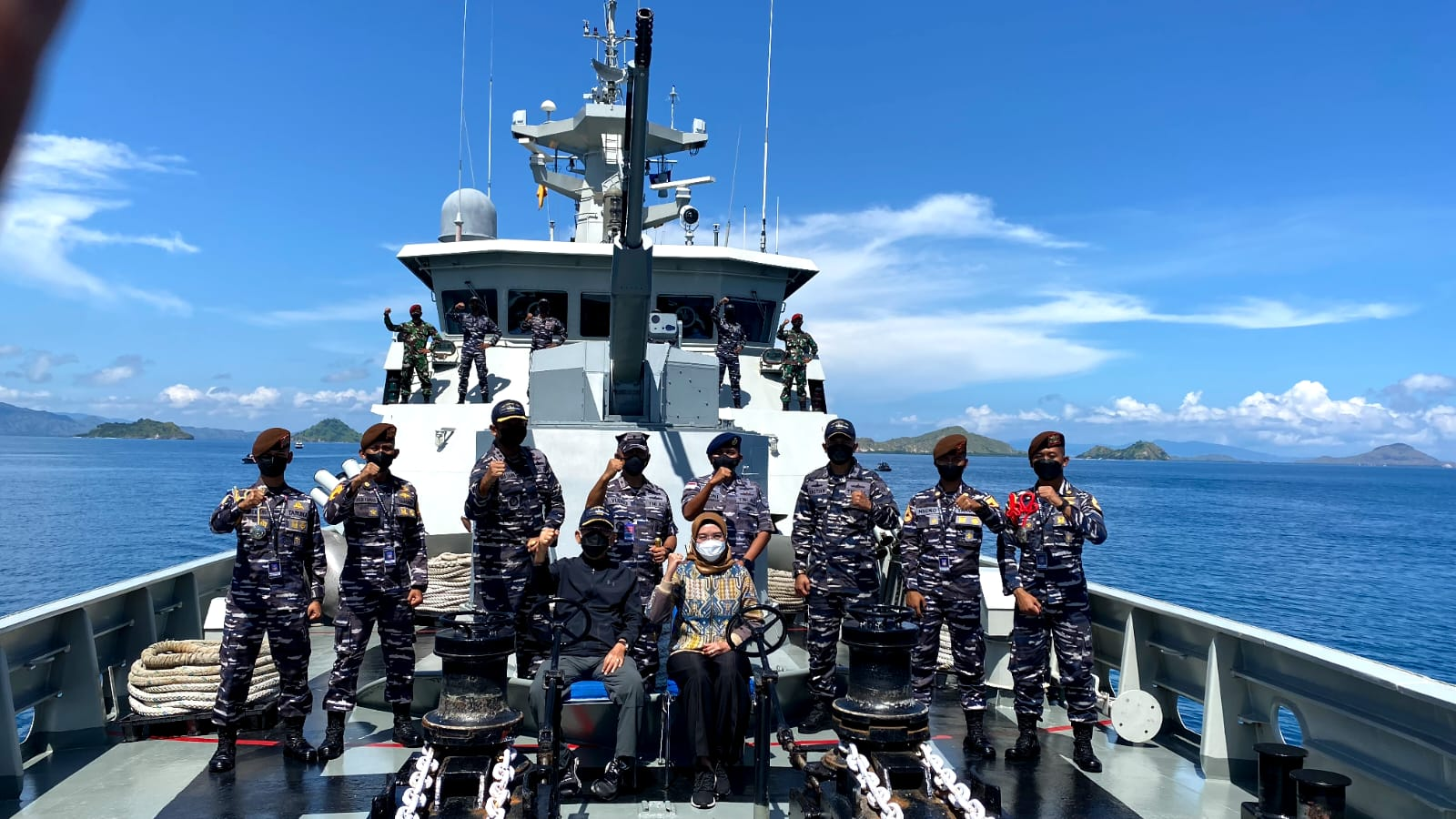
Indonesian navy ship, KRI Sampari (628) main gun AU-220M lightweight naval artillery module with 57 mm BM-57 autocannon

=== Current operators ===
- Angola
- Armenia
- Bangladesh: 34 Type 59 as of 2023
- Bulgaria
- Cambodia
- China: PG-59 variant
- Republic of the Congo
- Cuba
- Czech Republic
- Mali: +12 units
- Egypt: 800 units as of 2023
- Eritrea: 12 units
- Ethiopia
- Guinea: 12 units
- Guinea-Bissau: 10 units
- Indonesia: 256 units. 2 units AU-220M on Sampari-class fast attack craft. 14 units AK-725 (ZIF-72) on Kapitan Pattimura-class corvettes. Unknown amount upgraded to use the Rapier's Blindfire radar or the AN/UPS-3 as a fire control radar.
- Iran: 200 as of 2023
- Iraq
  - Kurdistan
- Kyrgyzstan: 24 units as of 2023
- Laos
- Mauritania: 12 units as of 2023
- Moldova: 11 units as of 2023
- Mongolia
- Mozambique: 60 units, 30 in storage as of 2023
- Namibia
- North Korea
- Pakistan: 144 units of Type-59 variant as of 2021
- Poland: 500 units
- Romania
- Russia
- Sahrawi Republic
- Sudan: Both S-60 and Type 59 versions
- Syria
- Free Syrian Army: Used by Syrian Rebels on various trucks chassis
- People's Defense Units (YPG)
- Thailand: 24 Type 59, it's estimated that only 6 are operational as of 2023
- Turkmenistan: 22 units as of 2023
- Ukraine
- Vietnam
- Zambia

=== Former operators ===
- Afghanistan: 24 units received in 1958, further 36 units delivered between 1973 and 1978.
- Albania
- Algeria: 75 units
- Bosnia and Herzegovina
- Belarus
- Czechoslovakia: 400 units as of 1992. Passed on to successor states.
- Finland: 12 units. Nicknamed Nikolai.
- Georgia: Used in the 2008 Russo-Georgian war
- Hungary: 144 units
- India
- ISIL: 21 units
- Israel: Captured units
- People's Republic of Kampuchea
- Libya: 90 units
- Morocco: 60 units
- Myanmar
- Nicaragua
- Soviet Union: Passed on to successor states
- Somalia
- Slovakia
- Transnistria
- Yemen: 120+ units
- Yugoslavia: 250 units, passed on to successor states

== Conflicts ==
Bajaur Campaign
Vietnam War
Laotian Civil War
Cambodian Civil War
Cambodian–Vietnamese War
Six-Day War
Yom Kippur War
Lebanese Civil War
Iran–Iraq War
Persian Gulf War
Bosnian War
Somali Civil War
Iraq War
Syrian Civil War
Yemeni Civil War (2014–present)
Second Nagorno-Karabakh War
Russo-Ukrainian War

== See also ==
- M51 Skysweeper served in the same role in the US Army
- List of weapons of the Lebanese Civil War
- Weapons of the Cambodian Civil War
- Weapons of the Laotian Civil War
