= Lob bomb =

Rocket-assisted improvised explosive device

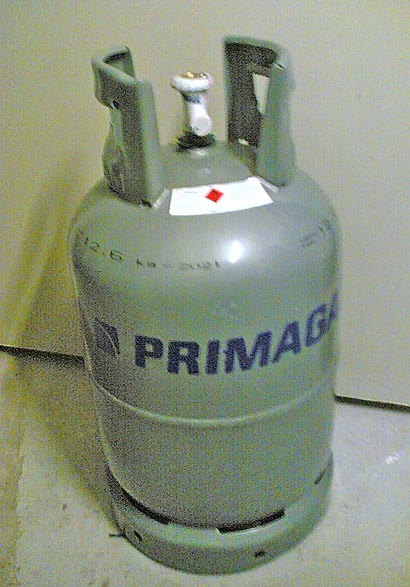
Lob bombs are often made from metal propane tanks that have been drained of their fuel and filled with explosives and fragmentation material

A lob bomb (known officially as an improvised rocket-assisted mortar, improvised rocket-assisted munition, or IRAM) is a rocket-fired improvised explosive device made from a large metal canister (often a propane gas tank that has been drained of its contents and filled with explosives, scrap metal, and ball bearings), which has been used by insurgents as well as the Iraqi military and police during the Iraq War since late 2007, as well as by various forces in other conflicts. The weapon is essentially an airborne version of an improvised explosive device.

== Design ==
Early lob bombs in Iraq were propelled by 107 mm rockets and launched, several at a time, from the backs of small trucks where they could be arranged in rows, sometimes by remote control (using a signal from either a cell phone, cordless phone, command wire, or other forms of remote control device). They are typically launched in an arced trajectory, which enables them to be aimed over walls that enclose opposing bases and other military facilities, in a similar manner to a conventional mortar. The weapon was believed to be highly inaccurate, and unofficial estimates place the range of lob bombs used so far as being between 50 and 150 yards (approx. 45 to 140 m). Later, lob bombs became a prime vector for chemical weapons, with up to 89% of chlorine-gas attacks by government forces in the Syrian Civil War being delivered by the method.

== History ==
The type of improvised launch system and a rocket is not new to warfare. The Provisional Irish Republican Army developed a similar system during the Troubles. It was used in the February 1991 attack on 10 Downing Street, the London office and home of the British prime minister.

Lob bombs were used during the Vietnam War by the VC/NVA, specifically in Operation Oklahoma Hills, 1 March to 29 May 1969. Below is a part of the After Action Report by the Col. R.L Nichols, Regt CO, 7th Marines that describes this device and how it was used:

"During the period 25 April to 27 May, there were four reported incidents of the enemy employing five “Lob Bombs” against positions on Hill 55 (there were two other reported incidents occurring outside the OKLAHOMA HILLS AO during the same period.) The first LOB BOMB spreads were directed at the rear billeting area temporarily occupied by the 3rd battalion, 26th Marines on finger 3, Hill 55 (AT973614) 252300H April 1969. The bomb consisted of 1 250 lb low drag bomb which had been refused to utilize an NVA # 8 fuse... and propelled a distance of 600 meters from a launch site located SE of the impact area. On this occasion, a low air burst occurred resulting in a maximum fragmentation dispersion. …Casualties from these four launches were 1 KIA and 28 WIA. Analysis of the launch and impact craters were conducted … 14 May when a .. demonstrated… lob bomb technique showing how the propelling charge (a quart sized or number 10 can packed with explosives) was placed under the center of gravity of the projectile and detonated. Subsequent field testing by personnel from the Division G-2 section resulted in more definitive performance parameters. The range which dud ordinance can be propelled my exceed 1000 meters and there appears to be no practical size limitation to the ordinance being propelled (a 750 lb bomb was reported being “lobbed” at an ARVN Ranger position) although the most commonly projected ordinance have been 105mm artillery duds and 250 lb low drag bombs. (A more detailed report on the construction and employment of the “lob bomb” is contained in 1st MarDiv Special Intelligence Bulletin dated 26 May 1969."

According to U.S. military officials, lob bombs are designed to cause "catastrophic damage," and have the ability to kill "scores of soldiers" at once, more than conventional improvised explosive devices. the use of such devices in Iraq were first described in the international media in July 2008, when General Jeffery Hammond, commander of the 4th Infantry Division and of U.S. forces in Baghdad, called the lob bomb "the greatest threat right now that we face." By July 12, 2008, in 11 lob bomb attacks on American bases, three U.S. soldiers had been killed and 15 had been wounded, all three deaths occurring in an April 28, 2008 attack on the U.S. Forward Operating Base Loyalty in eastern Baghdad. By then, the weapon has only been encountered in Baghdad, where it was used by Shiite insurgents, whose superior ability to conceal forensic evidence about their identity has been acknowledged by the U.S. military. The U.S. military has found that the rockets used to propel the lob bombs have been produced in Iran, Russia, and China.

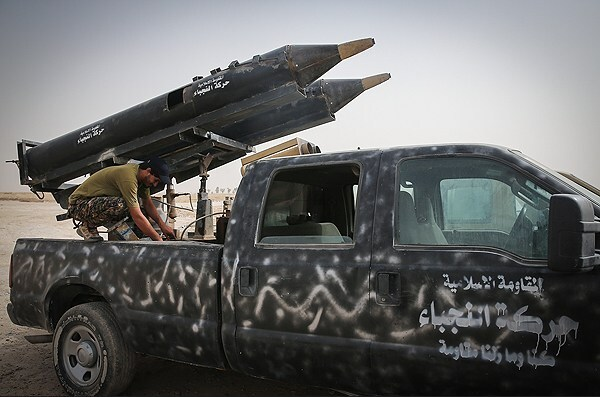
Improvised rocket-assisted mortar used by Harakat Hezbollah al-Nujaba in Saladin Governorate, Iraq

By 2011, it had been used as far out as the Iraq-Iran border by Iranian-backed militias to attack U.S. military installations in Iraq. These bombs have been used in Afghanistan and several other locations around the world, and some have been found in terror cell bombmaking facilities in the United States by the FBI and ATF. One media report indicates such a munition may have been used by the Taliban to bring down a Chinook helicopter in Afghanistan on August 6, 2011.

New types of IRAMs including Volcano rockets and Elephant rockets, have been used during the Syrian Civil War by both the government and the rebels as well as by the IS forces in Syria and elsewhere. In the 2016–2017 Battle of Mosul, the Iraqi interior ministry's Rapid Response Division utilized IRAMs mounted on Humvees against IS.

== See also ==
- Barrack buster
- Barrel bomb
- Explosively formed penetrator
- Improvised artillery in the Syrian Civil War
