= 5 cm Flak 41 =

German anti-aircraft gun

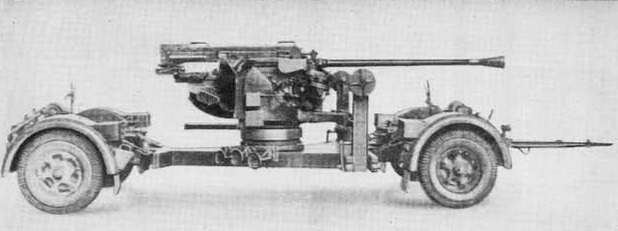
- Type: Anti-aircraft gun
- Place of origin: Nazi Germany

Service history
- In service: 1941–1945
- Used by: Nazi Germany
- Wars: World War II

Production history
- Designed: 1936
- Manufacturer: Rheinmetall-Borsig
- Produced: 1940
- No. built: 60
- Variants: twin-axle wheeled carriage; static mount

Specifications (Flak 41 on trailer)
- Mass: 4,300 kg (9,500 lb)
- Length: 605 cm (19 ft 10 in)
- Barrel length: 434 cm (14 ft 3 in) bore (86.8 calibers)
- Width: 239 cm (7 ft 10 in)
- Height: 216 cm (7 ft 1 in)
- Crew: 7
- Shell: 50 × 346B
- Shell weight: HE; 2.25 kg (4 lb 15 oz)
- Caliber: 50 mm (2.0 in)
- Breech: gas-operated bolt
- Elevation: -10° to +90°
- Traverse: 360°
- Rate of fire: 180 rounds/min (cyclic)
- Muzzle velocity: 840 m/s (2,800 ft/s)
- Effective firing range: 3,050 m (10,010 ft)
- Maximum firing range: 10,350 m (33,960 ft)
- Feed system: 5 round clip

The 5 cm Flak 41 (Flugabwehrkanone 41) was a German 50 mm (2.0 in) anti-aircraft gun produced for defending the intermediate zone above the range of light (37 mm (1.5 in)) guns, but below the ceiling of the heavy (75 mm (3.0 in) and above) pieces. The gun proved inadequate and was produced only in small numbers.

== Development ==
Development of the gun was slow: it began in 1936, but the contract was awarded to Rheinmetall-Borsig only in 1940. The gun was produced in two models, one mounted on a two-axle trailer, the other one stationary and used for defending important industrial installations. Neither was a success, and they shared the same faults. The speed of traverse was too slow for fast-moving targets and the gun proved underpowered, even though the propellant gave a blast powerful enough to dazzle the aimer in broad daylight. The relatively heavy cartridge (the shell alone weighed 2.2 kg (4.9 lb)) was cumbersome and heavy when loaded in 5-round clips.

The gun was automatic, gas-operated, and locked by the breech block dropping down, which engaged the buttress guides on the block against the guides on the jacket. The recoil of the breech operated the feed mechanism. The buffer was mounted centrally in the cradle, between the two springs of the recuperator.

Altogether 60 examples of the 5 cm Flak 41 were produced, starting from 1941, with only 24 of them still in use in 1945.

Later German attempts to create a medium anti-aircraft gun focused on 55 mm (2.2 in) weapons (Gerät 58) and the 5 cm Pak 38-derived Gerät 241.
