= Improvised weapon =

Ordinary object used as a weapon

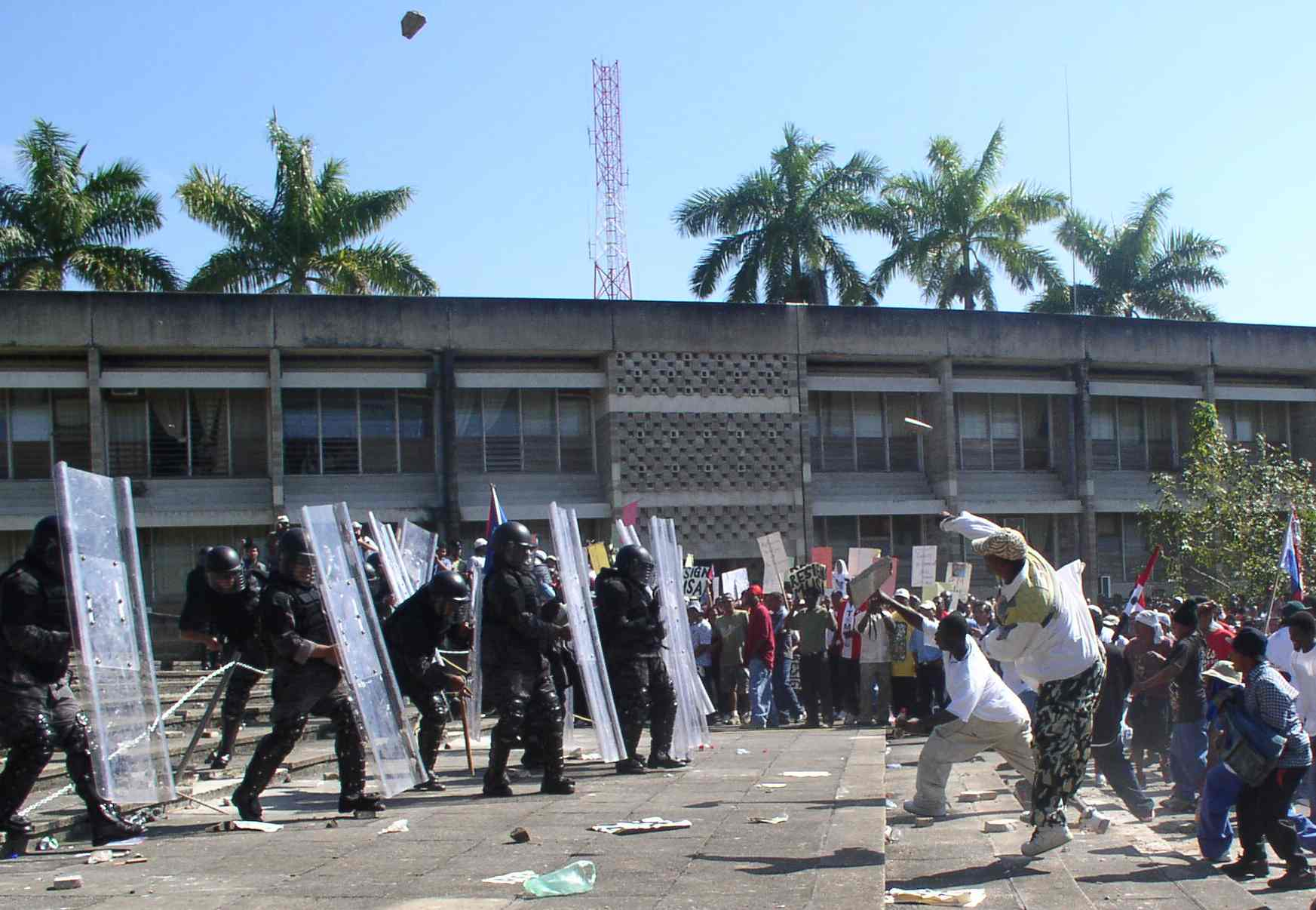
Rocks being thrown in 2005 Belize unrest

An improvised weapon is an object that was not designed to be used as a weapon but can be put to that use. They are generally used for self-defence or if the person is otherwise unarmed. In some cases, improvised weapons are commonly used by attackers in street fights, muggings, murders, gang warfare, during riots, or even during insurgencies, usually when conventional weapons such as firearms are unavailable or inappropriate.

Improvised weapons are common everyday objects that can be used in a variety of defensive applications. The objects are generally used in their normal state; they are not physically altered in any way to make them more functional as weapons.

== Examples ==
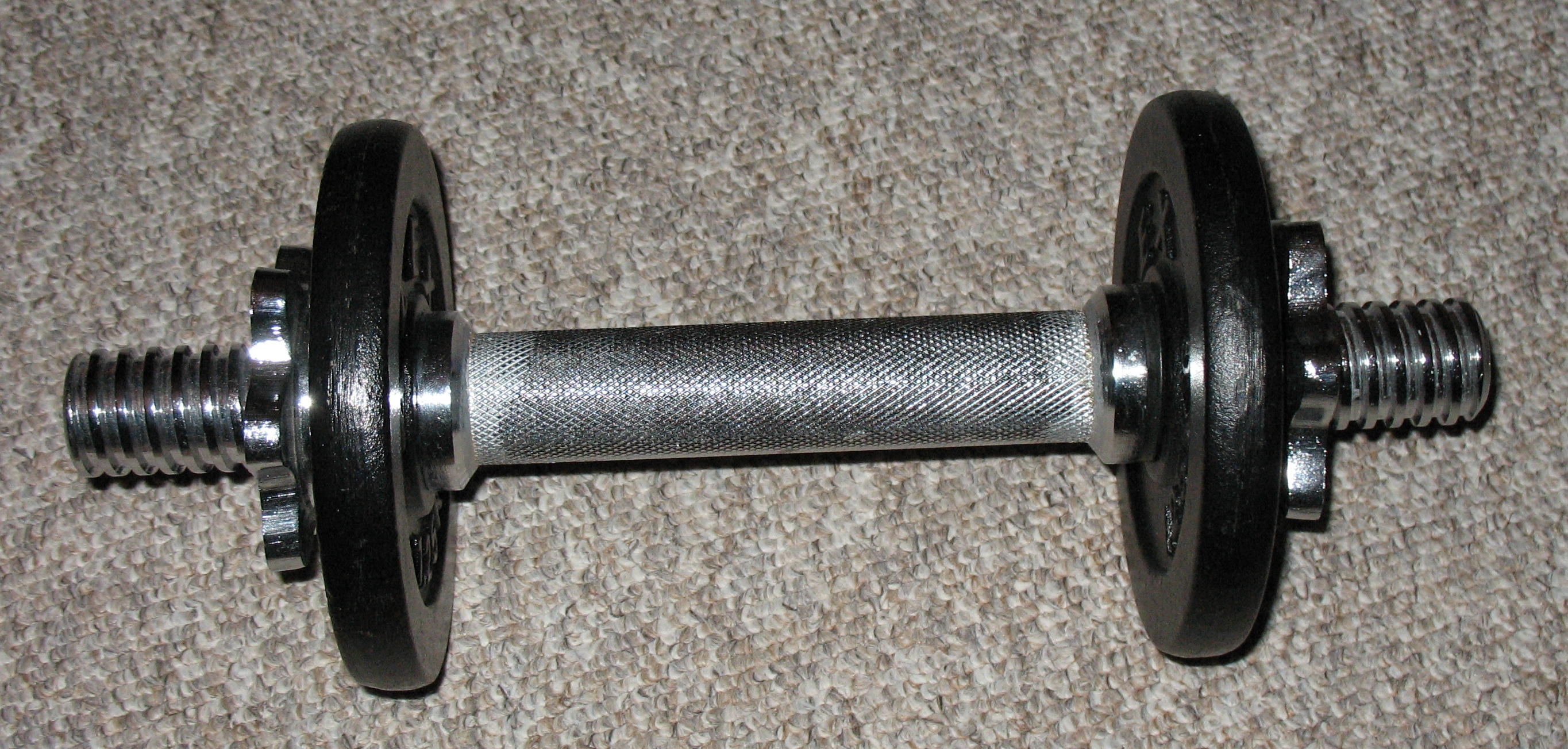
A spinlock adjustable dumbbell

Other than items designed as weapons, any object that can be used to cause bodily harm can be considered an improvised weapon. Examples of items that have been used as improvised weapons include:

- Sports equipment, such as baseball bats, golf clubs, cricket bats, hockey sticks, dumbbells, and cue sticks
- Objects made of glass, such as beer bottles
- Road vehicles, such as personal automobiles and rental trucks
- Civil and commercial aircraft, such as the Piper PA-28-236 Dakota and the Boeing 767
- Tools, such as scissors, ice axes, hacksaws, pliers, crowbars, screwdrivers, sledgehammers, lug wrenches, shovels, pipe wrenches, fire extinguishers, hammers, and entrenching tools
- Construction materials, such as 2×4s, pipes and bricks
- Natural materials, such as rocks
- Gardening and agricultural tools, such as axes, sickles, scythes, mattocks, machetes, pitchforks and pickaxes
- Kitchen equipment, such as kitchen knives, meat mallets, ice picks, meat cleavers, and frying pans
- Livestock herding equipment, such as lassos and whips
- Maritime equipment, such as grappling hooks, fishing nets, spearguns and boat oars
- Recreational toys, such as slingshots
- Furniture, such as chairs
- Musical instruments, such as didgeridoos and acoustic guitars
- Consumer pyrotechnics, such as firecrackers and fireworks

== In martial arts ==
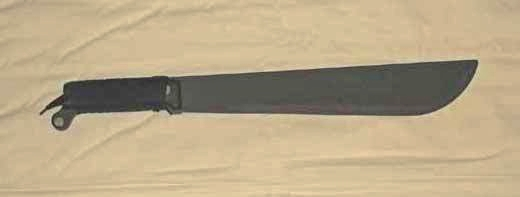
Modern factory-made machete, US Forces issue

Throughout history, common tools were used so often as weapons in self-defense that many of them evolved specifically into weapons or were adapted with the secondary purpose of being used in self-defense, usually by adding modifications to its design. Well-known examples include the Irish shillelagh, which was originally used as a walking stick; the Japanese bō, which may have originally been used to carry buckets and baskets; and the Buddhist monk's spade, a shovel monks used for burying corpses, which often had sharpened edges to help defend against bandits.

Many martial arts use common objects as weapons; Filipino martial arts such as Eskrima include practice with machetes, canes, bamboo spears, and knives as a result of the 333-year Spanish colonization in the Philippines that prohibited the ownership and use of standard swords and bladed weapons; Chinese martial arts and some Korean martial arts commonly feature the use of improvised weapons such as fans, hammers and staves. There are even some western martial arts that are based on improvised weapons, such as British quarterstaff fighting and Irish stick fighting.

After the German Peasants' Wars during 1524 and 1525, a 1542 fencing book edited by Paulus Hector Mair described fencing techniques using a scythe.

== Legal issues ==
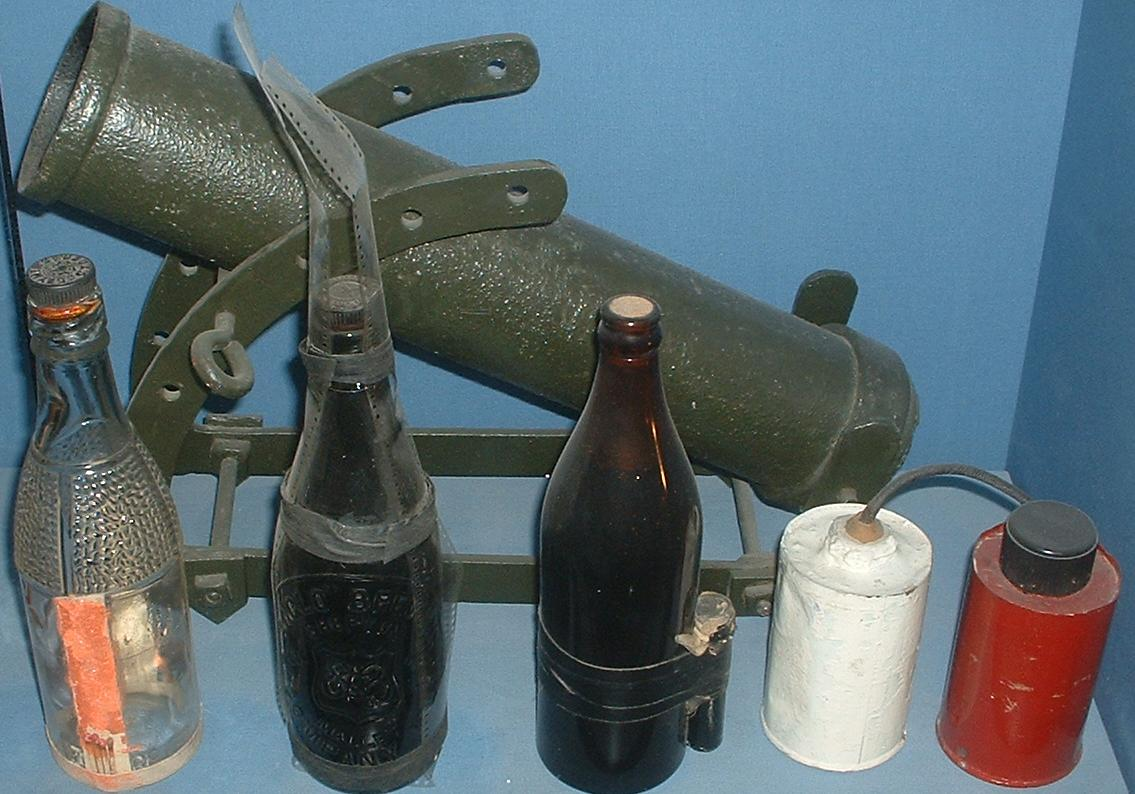
Improvised weapons of the British Home Guard, prepared against the possibility of a German invasion in WWII

Because of the use of common objects as weapons in violent crimes, many countries have laws that prevent the use of some tools and other non-weapon objects to be used for causing harm. It is possible for a person to be detained or even arrested by a law enforcement official or security personnel for carrying a potentially-harmful object if there is no reasonable use for it. For example, it is legal and perfectly understandable for someone to possess a kitchen knife or a hammer and keep it for use in one's home, but it could be judged suspicious for someone to carry a kitchen knife or a hammer concealed on their person or in plain sight when walking down a city street.

There are places that prohibit people from entering with objects that may be used as weapons. Most public schools in North America do not allow their students to bring pocket knives, butter knives or chain-wallets, sometimes with harsh zero tolerance policies. Airports typically prohibit objects that could be used as weapons from being carried as a carry-on or in a carry-on bag into the aircraft cabin. The security repercussions after the September 11 attacks saw restrictions widely extended to cover even objects like nail clippers and spiked wristbands.

== Makeshift weapons ==
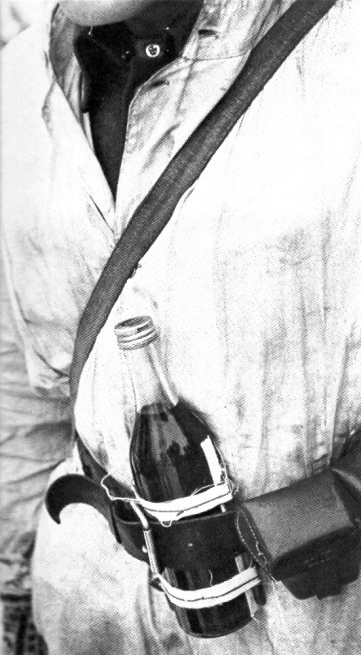
A Finnish soldier with a Molotov Cocktail during the Winter War

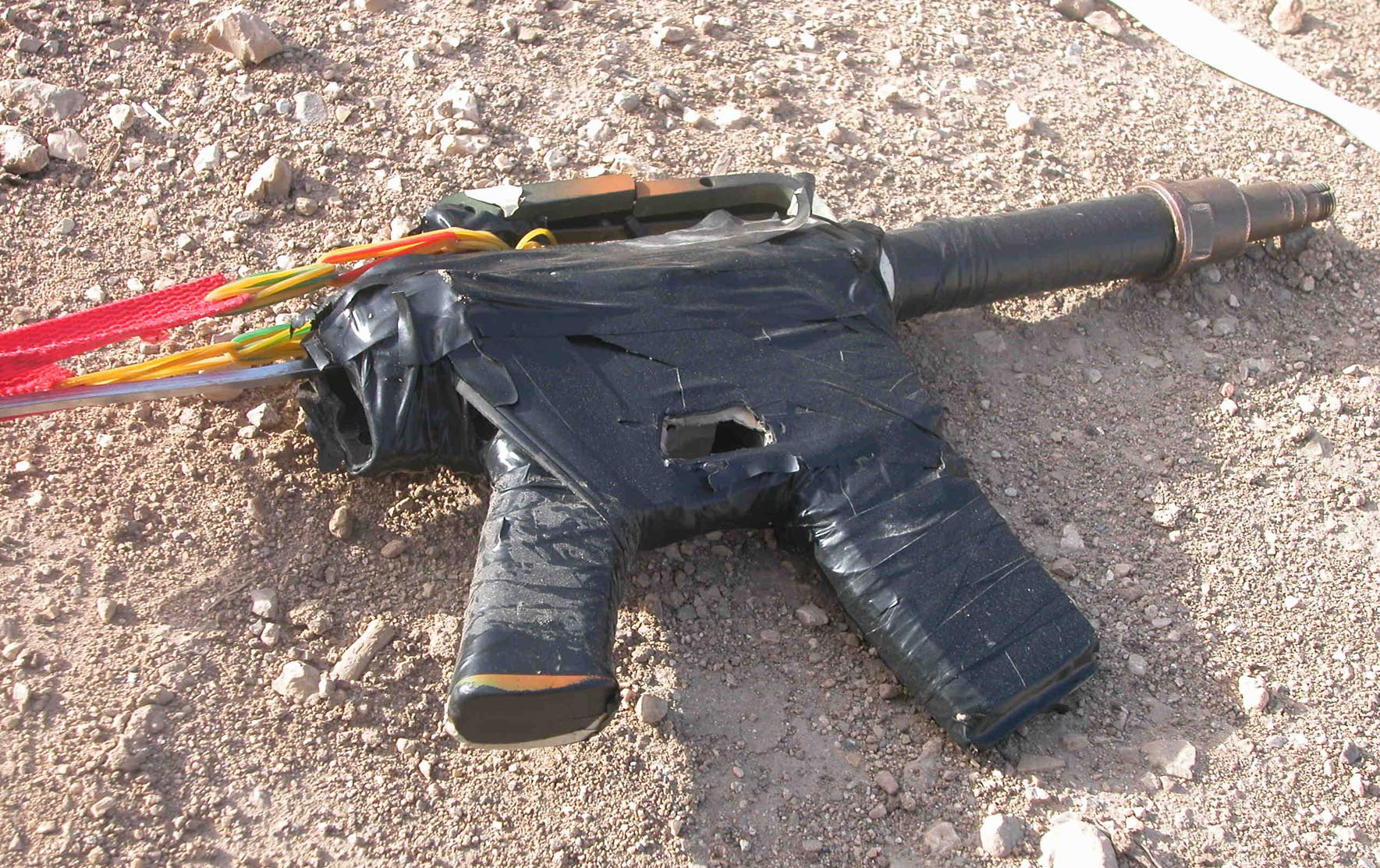
Improvised submachine gun "Carlo", made out of a toy gun. Used in West Bank.

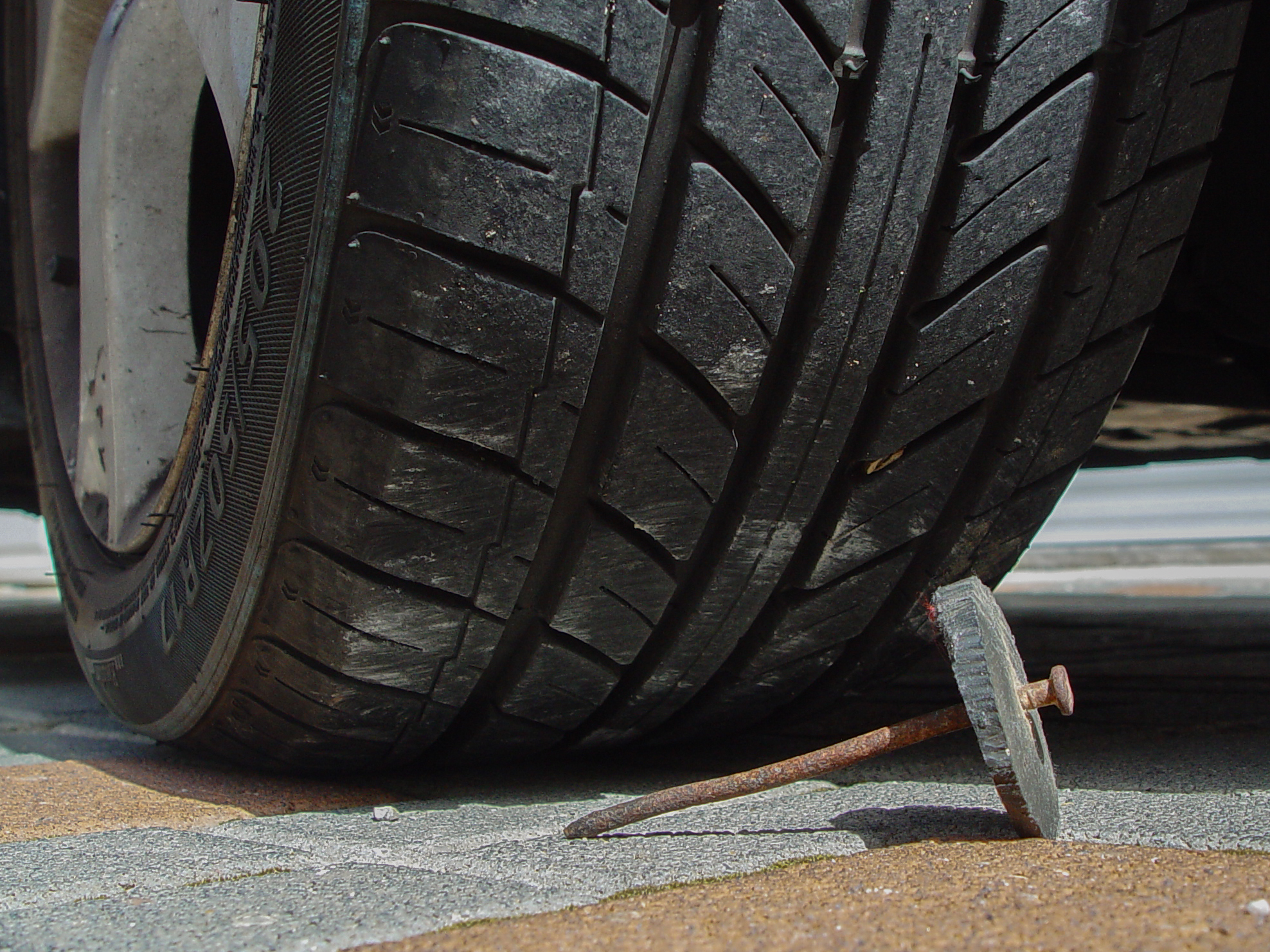
An improvised tire puncturing device (slang term ‘Ninja’), composed of an iron nail inserted into a rubber disc from a used tire. Many of these makeshift weapons were scattered by Palestinians on main roads in the occupied territories of the West Bank during the First Intifada.

A makeshift weapon is an everyday object that has been physically altered to enhance its potential as a weapon. It can also be used to refer to common classes of weapons such as guns, knives, and bombs made from commonly available items.

Examples of makeshift weapons include:

- Millwall brick
- Molotov cocktail
- Shiv
- Improvised firearms
- Marble gun, a type of improvised firearm which shoots marbles
- Improvised artillery is used by multiple factions in the Syrian Civil War. They include the Jahannam cannon, Jahim cannon, thunder cannon, mortar cannon and compressed air cannon.
- Chainlock (improvised flail)
- Garrote
- Stink bomb
- Smoke bomb
- Trench raiding club, a type of improvised wooden club with hammered hobnails around its circumference used for trench raiding during World War I.
- Blackjack/Sap
- Improvised explosive devices
  - A letter bomb is an explosive device sent via the postal service, designed with the intention to injure or kill the recipient when opened.
  - A pipe bomb is an IED that uses a tightly sealed section of pipe filled with an explosive material.
  - A barrel bomb is an unguided IED made to be dropped from helicopters and fixed-wing aircraft.
  - A lob bomb is a rocket-fired IED.
- Barrack busters were improvised mortars used by the Provisional Irish Republican Army during The Troubles.
- Acid packets were used by rioters during the Citizenship Amendment Act protests in India

The improvised Molotov cocktail was used with great success by the heavily outnumbered Finnish forces in the Winter War against the Soviet Union. The mixture of flammable petroleum, often thickened with soap or tar, was so effective against the Soviet tanks that the Finns began mass producing Molotov cocktails, and issuing them to their troops. While the first documented use of such improvised incendiary devices was in the Spanish Civil War, their use in the Winter War was much more prevalent, and it was at that time they were named after the Soviet Foreign Minister Vyacheslav Mikhailovich Molotov, to match the Molotov bread baskets.

== See also ==
- Insurgency weapons and tactics
- List of criminal enterprises, gangs, and syndicates
- List of riots
- TM 31-210 Improvised Munition Handbook
- Suicide attack
- Suicide weapon
- Vehicle-ramming attack
