= RPG-75 =

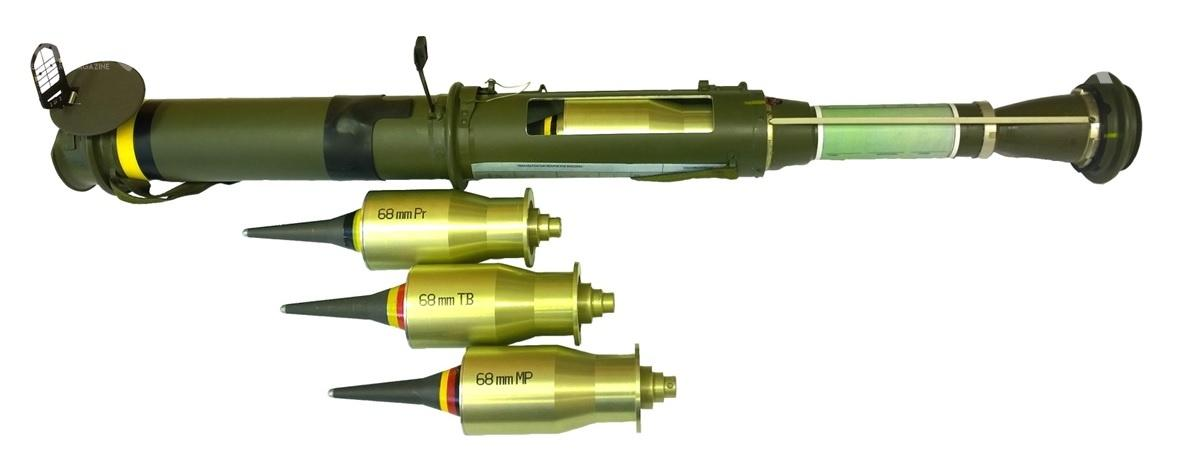
- Type: Disposable recoilless gun
- Place of origin: Czechoslovakia

Service history
- In service: 1975–present
- Used by: See § Users
- Wars: South African Border War; Iraq War; Russo-Georgian War; Syrian Civil War; Russian invasion of Ukraine

Production history
- Designed: 1970s
- Manufacturer: Zeveta a.s.

Specifications
- Mass: 3.2 kg (7 lb)
- Length: 633 mm (folded) / 890 mm (combat ready)
- Cartridge: one 68mm projectile
- Caliber: 68 mm
- Muzzle velocity: 189 m/s
- Maximum firing range: 300 m
- Sights: Leaf sight

The RPG-75 is a portable, disposable, single-shot, recoilless smoothbore anti-tank weapon developed in the 1970s in Czechoslovakia. It fires a 68mm grenade with an effective range of 300 meters and a maximum range of 1000 meters, intended for use against light tanks and armoured track vehicles.

== Versions ==
- The RPG-75-MP is an improved version with dual-purpose projectiles, consisting of both HEAT and thermobaric warheads.
- RPG-75-M is an improved version with HEAT projectiles.
- RPG-75-TB is an improved version with thermobaric projectiles, introduced in 2009.
- RPG-Nh-75 is designated for training ball firing. Identical to the combat version, only with inert projectiles.
- RPG-Cv-75 is designated for firing practice. Contains an embedded 7.65 mm barrel - reusable.
- RPG-Šk-75 is designated for firing preparation, target aiming, and triggering. Contains no explosive or spotting charge.

== Specifications ==
- Length (folded for transport): 633 mm
- Length (combat ready): 890 mm
- Weight: 3.2 kg
- Weight of projectile: 0.8 kg
- Weight of explosive: 0.32 kg
- Bore diameter: 68 mm
- Maximum effective range against a moving target: 200 metres
- Maximum effective range against a fixed target: 300 metres
- Maximum range: 1000 metres
- Penetration: 330 mm of rolled homogeneous armour (RHA)
- Time of flight to auto-destruction: 3 - 6 seconds
- Muzzle velocity: 189 metres per second
- Operating temperature: −40 to +50 °C
- Ammunition: projectile with HEAT warhead

== Users ==
- Algeria
- Czech Republic
- Georgia
- Mexico
- Namibia: SWAPO
- Poland
- Sierra Leone
- Slovenia
- Syria
- Slovakia
- Ukraine
