= Improvised artillery in the Syrian civil war =

Type of improvised artillery

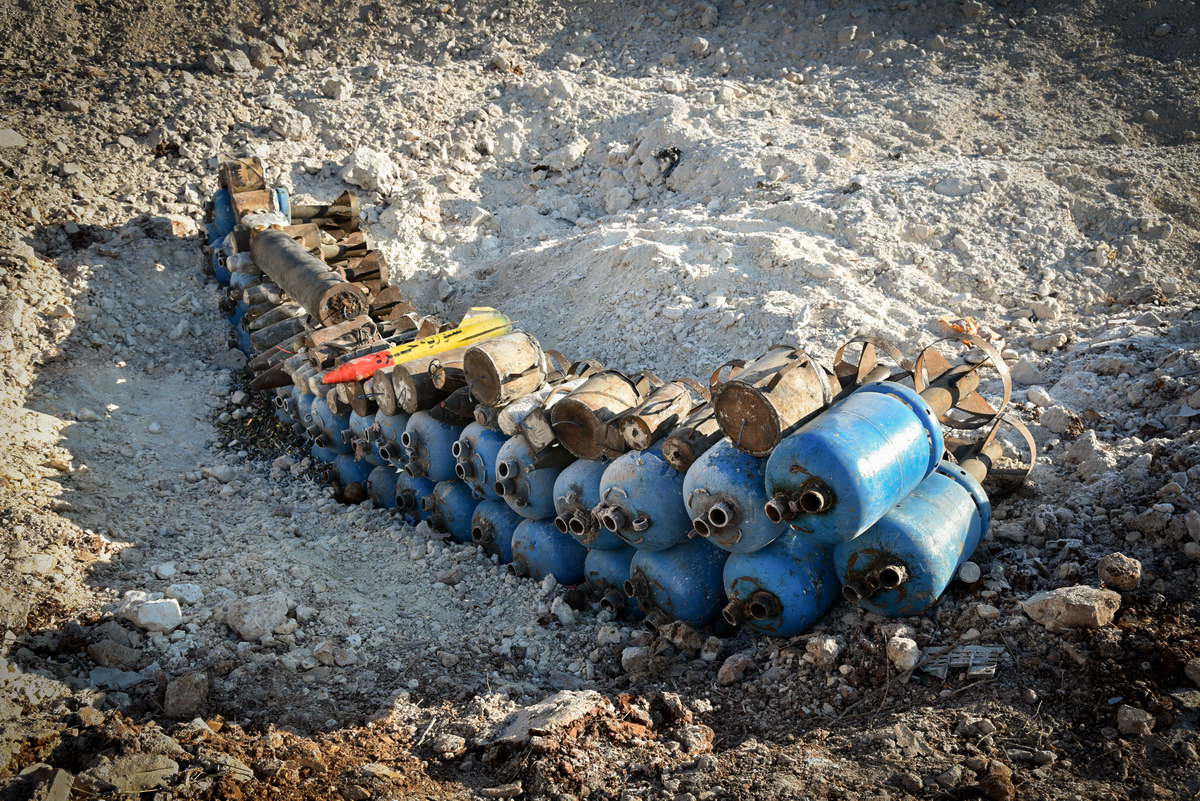
A collection of improvised rocket- and mortar projectiles in Aleppo in December 2016.

Improvised artillery in the Syrian Civil War are improvised weapons created and used by factions of the Syrian Civil War, most notably Syrian opposition forces. The weapons include the Hell Cannon and its variants, the Thunder Cannon and the Mortar Cannon.

== Hell cannon ==
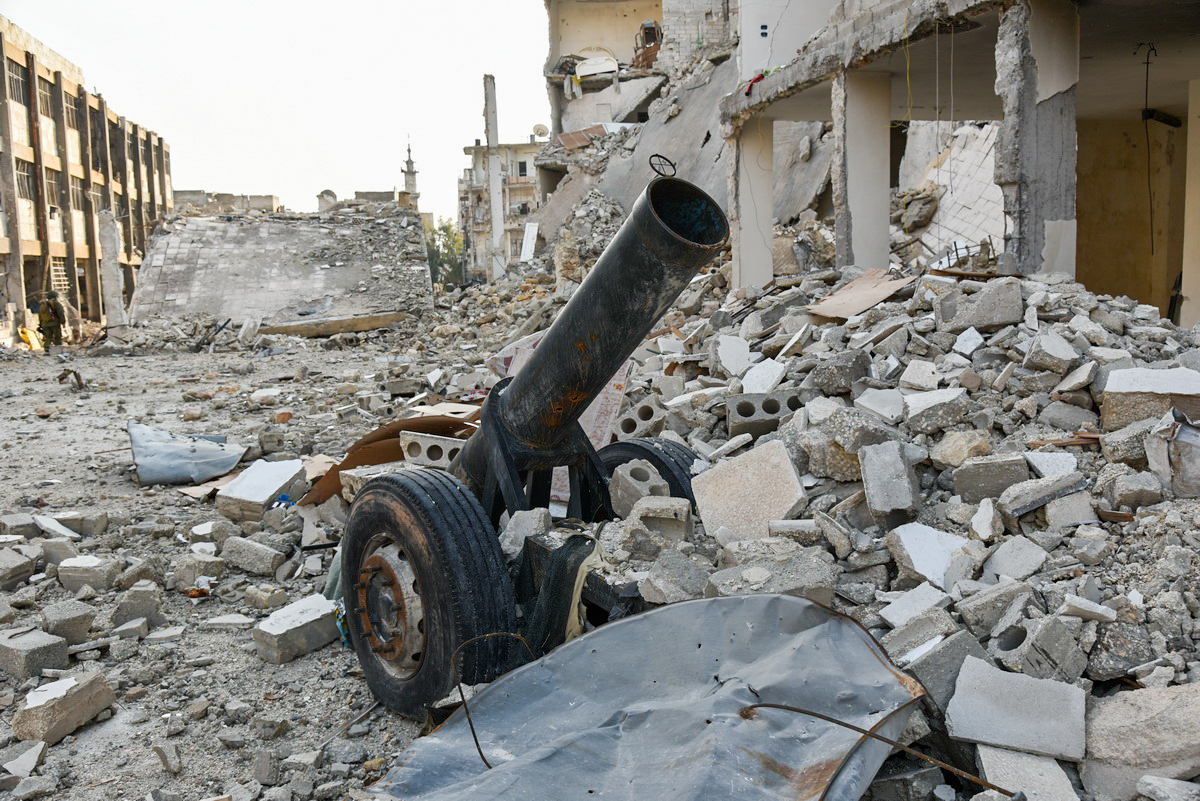
A hell cannon found after the Battle of Aleppo in December 2016.

The Hell cannon (Arabic: مدفع جهنم) is a general name used to describe a class of mortar-like improvised firearms in-use by insurgent forces during the Syrian Civil War, mainly in the Aleppo area. It was first noted in 2013 and a number of home-made cannon variants have appeared in Syria since.

=== History ===
The Jahannam (Hell) cannon was first manufactured in 2012 in the Idlib countryside, by the insurgent group Ahrar al-Shamal Brigade. It was specifically designed for shelling the town of al-Foua. It was manufactured at a plant owned by Abu Adnan al-Idlibi in the town of Binnish. Manufacture of the cannon moved to Aleppo after Khaled Hayani – leader of the Free Syrian Army (FSA) Badr Martyrs' Brigade – appropriated the design. It was first noted by the press in May 2013, by Brown Moses (later founder of Bellingcat).

The Hell cannon and its variants were manufactured by elements of the Free Syrian Army in and around Aleppo in re-purposed manufacturing businesses that had the tools and materials available. As the Islamic State (IS) became more powerful in the region, it negotiated with local arms makers for making the projectiles and a grassroots weapons industry began to emerge. Some of the arms makers moved to al-Bab and Manbij after IS was expelled from Aleppo. The most famous was Abdo al-Hiriatany, nicknamed 'Karo the Armenian'.

According to journalist Basel Dayoub in Al Akhbar:

In Aleppo, the Hell Cannon is associated with one of the most famous fighters in Anadan, named Jamil Kadour, who had close ties with Khaled Hayani. Kadour went from being an auto mechanic to booby-trapping vehicles and repairing weapons, then to manufacturing bombs and cannons. He was killed by IS members and his body was found in a mass grave at the Institute of Electricity near Haritan. An opposition source said Kadour was killed because he refused to work with IS outside Anadan, demanded exorbitant prices for repairing weapons, and equipping the Hell Cannon and preferred to manufacture arms for their arch-enemy, Khaled Hayani.

Although invented in the countryside of the Idlib Governorate, the Hell cannon was primarily used in the Aleppo area during urban warfare of the Battle of Aleppo. The cannons' medium range (about 1.5 kilometers) requires the target to be nearby, but also for the cannon to remain hidden from counter-battery fire due to it being unarmored and its limited ability to fire-and-move. Thus the Hell cannon is vulnerable in the open countryside. In cities, a combination of close quarter fighting and the ability to hide behind walls and buildings gave it an advantage.

According to the Britain-based Syrian Observatory for Human Rights, as of December 2014, Hell cannons were "wildly inaccurate" and have killed over 300 civilians, most of them in Aleppo.

=== Variants ===
==== Jahannam (Hell) Cannon ====
External videos
- Hell Cannon loading and firing Archived 20 May 2022 at Ghost Archive

The cannon barrel is about 3 feet long, mounted on wheels and towed. It is muzzle loaded. An explosive such as ANFO is first dropped into the muzzle and tamped with a wooden stick.

The projectile is a re-purposed gas cylinder filled with explosives and shrapnel (the payload). Welded to the payload is about a 2-foot metal tube (the tail) about the same circumference as the cannon's muzzle. The full length of the tail is inserted into the muzzle, forming a tight seal inside the cannon. The payload remains outside the muzzle but still attached to the tail now inside the cannon. When the cannon is fired, the force of the explosion takes the path of least resistance pushing the projectile towards the target at high velocity. Flight stabilizing fins which are part of the tail ensemble ensure the cylinder doesn't tumble.

The projectile weighs up to about 88 pounds with three quarters of the weight as explosives. The projectile reportedly has a range of 1.5 kilometers.

There were believed to be 20 such cannons around December 2014.

External image
- Hell Cannon variant. Syrian Islamic Front, Aleppo

==== Unnamed variation #1 ====
An unnamed variation uses a projectile similar to the hell cannon (a blue gas cylinder) but the tail fins form a flat base. The entire projectile is inserted into a larger diameter cannon, which is the maximum diameter of the projectile.

==== Jahim (Hellfire) Cannon ====
The Hell Cannon was followed by the Jahim (Hellfire) Cannon in 2013. This model can fire large ordnance such as water heaters or oxygen cylinders weighing as much as 661 pounds. It was first used in Aleppo's Ashrafieh neighborhood and was also used to attack the Citadel of Aleppo.

==== Multi-barrel hell cannons ====
===== Quad Hell Cannon =====
A quad Hell cannon fired four Hell cannons at once. The model was reportedly no longer manufactured after it was bombed by a military helicopter during the battle of Ard al-Hamra. However, an April 2015 video showed a quad hell cannon being used by the Levant Front in the province of Aleppo, in the village of Bashkoy. It was mounted on a front-loading earth mover.

== Thunder cannon ==
In April 2015, pictorial evidence of the Thunder Cannon became available. The projectile is an empty 100 mm shell casing from a T-55 tank that has been re-purposed.

== Mortar cannon ==
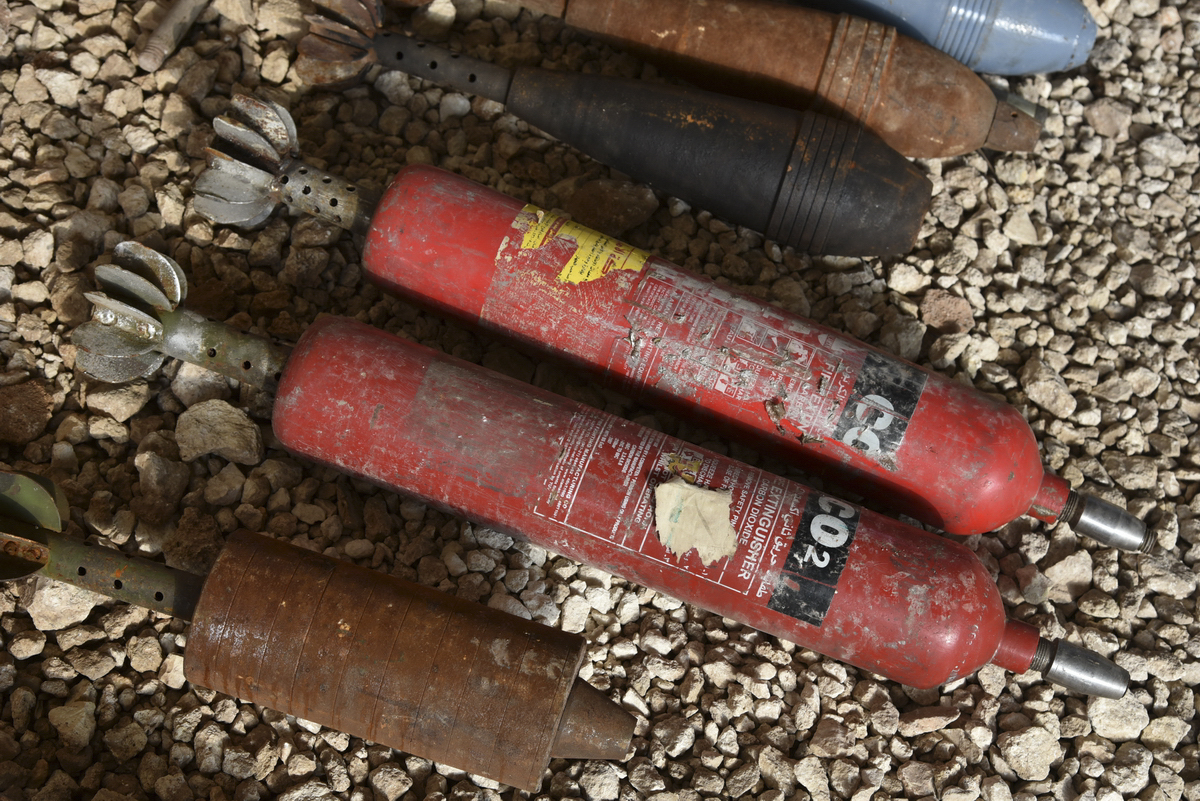
Factory made and improvised mortar projectiles found in Aleppo.

In April 2015, the FSA 16th Division in Aleppo showed a video of them using an improvised cannon that fired a mortar round. A metal tube with one end closed is the cannon barrel. The projectile is a factory-made mortar round. The round is placed into the barrel and it is laid horizontally such as out the opening of a window. On launch, the otherwise unattached barrel flies backwards from the recoil of the mortar.

== Omar cannon ==
The FSA Al-Rahman Legion deployed a series of breech-loaded cannons mounted on a hydraulic elevation system on the back of a truck, fired with a pull-string. Albeit described by some Western mass media as a mysterious 19th-century antique cannon, the gun is in reality a modern improvised artillery piece.

== Compressed air cannon ==
In June 2015, a video was posted online showing a large compressed air cannon in Daraa operated by Ahrar al-Sham.

== Improvised rockets ==
New types of IRAMs including the Volcano IRAM and Elephant Rockets, were used during the Syrian Civil War by rebels and government forces alike. Volcano Rockets were capable of destroying entire housing blocks with a direct hit, and were a decisive factor during the 2013 Second Battle of al-Qusayr. They are standard artillery rockets with a larger warhead, drastically increasing their lethality, however at the expense of decreased range and accuracy. The Volcano Rocket has been in mass production since the around the time of the battle of al Qusayr and were used in nearly every front of the Syrian Civil War. There are three known iterations: 107mm and 122mm were commonly used, and a 220mm variant that was uncommon. There are other sub-types. The rockets were improvised from 107mm and 122mm Grad Rockets; the 220mm rocket was based on a Syrian produced rocket.

== See also ==
- Improvised weapon
- Barrack buster
- Barrel bomb
- Chongtong
- Davidka
- Rifle grenade
- Stielgranate 41
