= TMA =

TMA may refer to:

== Arts and entertainment ==
- Tejano Music Awards, Texas, US
- TMA Awards (now UK Theatre Awards)
- Total Media Agency, a Japanese pornography producer
- The Mod Archive, a web index of music module files
- The Magnus Archives, a fictional horror podcast
- "The Magician's Apprentice (Doctor Who)", a 2015 TV episode

== Science ==
- Tense–Modality–Aspect or tense–aspect–mood, grammatical system
- Tetramethylammonium ion or its salts
- Thermomechanical analysis
- Third man argument, a philosophical criticism of Plato's theory of Forms
- Thrombotic microangiopathy
- Tissue microarray, device for analysing many histological tissue samples
- Transcription mediated amplification, in molecular biology
- Trimethylamine, (CH_{3})_{3}N, a simple amine
- Trimethylaluminium, (CH_{3})_{3}Al
- Trimesic acid
- Psychedelic or hallucinogenic drugs that are isomeric-substituted amphetamines:
  - 3,4,5-Trimethoxyamphetamine (TMA or TMA-1)
  - 2,4,5-Trimethoxyamphetamine (TMA-2)
  - 2,3,4-Trimethoxyamphetamine (TMA-3)
  - 2,3,5-Trimethoxyamphetamine (TMA-4)
  - 2,3,6-Trimethoxyamphetamine (TMA-5)
  - 2,4,6-Trimethoxyamphetamine (TMA-6)
- Tristeza y muerte de agave, a collective term for diseases of blue agave

== Transportation ==
=== Aviation ===
- Terminal Manoeuvring Area / Terminal Control Area - aviation term for a controlled high-volume airspace
- Trans Maldivian Airways
- TMA Cargo (Trans Mediterranean Airways SAL), a defunct Lebanese airline

=== Engineering ===
- TMA Engineering, UK
- Truck-mounted attenuator, crash attenuator

=== Space exploration ===
- Russian Soyuz spacecraft missions (Russian: транспортный модифицированный антропометрический, romanized: Transportnyi Modifitsirovannyi Antropometricheskii, lit. 'Transport Modified Anthropometric', or ТМА)
  - Soyuz TMA-1, launched 30 October 2002
  - Soyuz TMA-2, launched 26 April 2003
  - Soyuz TMA-3, launched 18 October 2003
  - Soyuz TMA-4, launched 19 April 2004
  - Soyuz TMA-5, launched 14 October 2004
  - Soyuz TMA-6, launch 15 April 2005
  - other Soyuz-TMA missions

== Military ==
- Target Motion Analysis, by submarine sonar
- Tanzania Military Academy
- TMA (German mine)
- Yugoslavian landmines:
  - TMA-1 mine
  - TMA-2 mine
  - TMA-3 mine
  - TMA-4 mine

== Communications ==
- Television Market Area, official designation of the U.S. Federal Communications Commission
- Tower Mounted Amplifier or masthead amplifier

== Medicine ==
- Tissue microarray, a paraffin block in which tissue cores are assembled in array fashion to allow multiplex histological analysis

== Other uses ==
- Tehsil Municipal Administration
- Texas A&M Maritime Academy, at Texas A&M University at Galveston
- TMA (The Marketing Arm), a marketing and creative agency owned by Omnicom Group
