= List of equipment of the Lebanese Armed Forces =

Lebanese Armed Forces equipment still contains significant amounts of old weaponry, but it has embarked on some major improvements recently. A collection of Western and Soviet made arms and equipment exists ranging from rifles to tanks such as the T-54/55. However, the Lebanese army is still trying to rearm and modernize itself through purchases and/or military aid from different countries such as the United States, Belgium, Russia, and The Netherlands.

== Rearming and modernization ==
The LAF has been attempting to modernize and equip itself since 2005. Due to the budget limits, and instead of spawning an indigenous arms industry the LAF is relying on donations and friendly priced equipment.

The United States has been supplying the Lebanese Armed Forces with light to medium arms since 2005, in the form of a package of more than US$1.2 billion-worth of equipment, including Humvees, M35s, Mk 19 grenade launchers, M141 Bunker Defeat Munitions, TOW 2, HELLFIRE 2, AT4, and Barrett M107 .50 Cal. snipers. The US has promised to supply Lebanon with M2A2 ODS and M109A5. In addition, the US supplied Lebanon with 12 RQ-11 Raven small hand-launched UAVs, 12 M-109A3 and 183 additional M198 Howitzers from 2008 to 2016 making the total to 219, and promised to deliver all water patrol boats and more utility, and attack helicopters.

=== Recent acquisitions & military aid ===
- The United Kingdom donated 1.2 million euros worth of armoured vehicle parts in May 2023.
- Lebanese Army received 3 Huey 2 helicopters from the US in February 2021.
- The Lebanese Army received VAB and Hot missiles and other equipment from France on May 30, 2017.
- Lebanon received 12 M109 155mm self-propelled howitzers from Jordan in March 2015 and 400 Tow 2 by June 2015.
- Lebanon received 72 M-198 Howitzers from the United States on February 8, 2015, along with M1044 (Up-Armored HMMWV) vehicles donated by the US, as part of the aid for fighting terrorism.
- Lebanon received 120 Land Rover Defender 90s from the United Kingdom on December 10, 2013.
- Lebanon received 71 HMMWVs, M1038 Cargo/Troop Carrier, M1026 Armament Carrier with Basic Armor, M1044 Armament Carrier w/ Supplemental Armor, vehicles donated by the US on August 17, 2013.
- In August 2013 France enhanced the operational capacities of the Lebanese army by providing military equipment. The gift included bulletproof vests, optical equipment and HOT missiles for Gazelle Helicopter.
- Lebanon received 31 M1151 (Up-Armored HMMWV) vehicles donated by the US on August 17, 2012.
- Lebanon received 24 M1151 (Up-Armored HMMWV) vehicles donated by the US on July 22, 2011.
- Lebanon received 106 vehicles donated by the UN in Lebanon on 13 May 2011.
- Lebanon received 30 M-198 Howitzers in January, 2010. This followed an earlier supply of 41 Howitzers in 2008, and 36 Howitzers operated by the LAF since the 80s.
- Lebanon received 16 AIFVs and 12 M-113 ambulances in early December 2009, purchased from Belgium.
- On May 22, Lebanon officially announced the delivery of the first 10 M60/A3, one M88, and several other items during a ceremony at Beirut International Airport.
- On March 23, 2009, the LAF took delivery of 40 HMMWVs, and 9 sport utility vehicles from the US.
- On March 20, 2009, the LAF purchased 6 Kawasaki Brute Force 750 4×4is.
- On December 28, 2008, the US delivered 72 HMMWVs. Twelve of these were ambulances.
- During 2008, the US supplied Lebanon with 200 M35A3 and 41 M198 Howitzers.
- As of March 2008, the Netherlands had donated 100 DAF trucks to the Lebanese Army.
- On April 20, 2015, the Lebanese army took delivery of 48 MBDA Milan short-range anti-tank missiles as part of the $3 billion package donated by Saudi Arabia.
- On February 19, 2016, The army chief expressed in an interview to Al-Akhbar newspaper the status of the Military aid to Lebanon and said: "There are contributions from many countries, but they remain symbolic. The US still the largest armament supplier." Later on the same day the Saudi Arabia press agency quoted a Saudi official, that Saudi Arabia halted the $3 billion program for military supplies to Lebanon.

== Weapons ==
| Name | Image | Origin | Caliber | Notes | Reference |
Pistols
| Browning Hi-Power | | Belgium; United States | 9×19mm Parabellum | Standard-issue for military and police. | |
| Glock 17, 19, 18, and 43x | | Austria | 9×19mm Parabellum | In use with Special Forces. | |
| Beretta 92 | | Italy | 9×19mm Parabellum | Limited use by Special Forces | |
| P-64 CZAK | | Polish People's Republic | 9×18mm Makarov | In reserve | |
| Heckler & Koch P7 | | West Germany | 9×19mm Parabellum | | |
| MAB PA-15 | | France | 9×19mm Parabellum | | |
Submachineguns
| FN P90 | | Belgium | FN 5.7×28mm | Currently in storage. | |
| Heckler & Koch MP5 | | West Germany | 9x19mm Parabellum | A3 variant and K variant used. Used by Marine Commandos. | |
Shotguns
| Franchi SPAS-12 | | Italy | 12 Gauge | | |
| Mossberg 500 | | United States | 12 Gauge | | |
Assault Rifles & Carbines
| M4 carbine | | United States | 5.56x45mm NATO | Standard-issue rifle of all intervention regiments and special forces units. Also widely used by conventional infantry. | M4 components being sold to Lebanese special forces. M4/M4A1s sold as a 2008 Foreign Military Sales package. More M4/M4A1s announced to be sold via FMS program in 2017. |
| M16A1/A2/A4 | | United States | 5.56x45mm NATO | Standard-issue rifle. | In total 70,000 M16A4 were being received. All deliveries were scheduled to be made in 2021 to replace the remaining M16A1 variant. |
| CQBR Mk.18 | | United States | 5.56x45mm NATO | | Used by the Navy Commandos and the Airborne regiment. |
| AK-74 | | Soviet Union | 5.45x39mm | | Limited usage. AK 74U is widely used by the Lebanese Navy. Other variants, such as AKS 74, AK74M, are used by the Artillery and Armored Brigades. |
| Beretta ARX160 | | Italy | 5.56x45mm NATO | Limited usage. | documented usage during training with Italian Armed Forces of the UNIFIL. |
| Heckler & Koch G36 | | Germany | 5.56x45mm NATO | | Seen in use by ISF Intelligence units. |
| Daewoo Precision Industries K2 | | Republic of Korea | 5.56x45mm NATO | Limited usage. | only documented use was in training with UNIFIL's ROK Armed Forces. |
Battle Rifles
| Heckler & Koch G3 | | West Germany | 7.62x51mm NATO | | Only used for cadet training. G3A3 and G3A4 Variants used |
Sniper Rifles
| Steyr SSG 69 | | Austria | 7.62x51mm NATO | | |
| M24 | | United States | 7.62x51mm NATO | | |
| Barrett MK22 Mod 0 Advanced Sniper Rifle (ASR) | | United States | .338 or 7.62x51mm NATO | | Confirmed use and document, replacing old M24s mainly in use with Special Forces |
Designated Marksman Rifles
| M110 | | United States | 7.62x51mm NATO | | |
| QBU-88 | | China | 5.8×42mm | 144 Units | Limited use. Donated by China in 2015, received in July 2016. |
Anti-Materiel Rifles
| Barrett M82/M107 | | United States | 12.7x99mm NATO | | |
Light Machine Guns
| M249 | | United States | 5.56x45mm NATO | | Service SAW, active with all branches and regiments. |
| MK-46 | | United States | 5.56x45mm NATO | | Mainly used by Airborne Regiment, and Lebanese Commando Regiment |
| FN Minimi | | Belgium | 5.56x45mm NATO | | |
Medium Machine Guns
| M1919 Browning | | United States | .30-06 Springfield | M1919A4 Variant Used | 800 delivered by United States in 2016. |
General-Purpose Machine Guns
| PK machine gun | | Soviet Union | 7.62x54mmR | PKM Variant also Used | |
| Rheinmetall MG 3 | | West Germany | 7.62x51mm NATO | | |
| M60 machine gun | | United States | 7.62x51mm NATO | | 320 delivered by United States in 2016. |
| M240 | | United States | 7.62x51mm NATO | | |
| FN MAG | | Belgium | 7.62x51mm NATO | | |
Heavy Machine Guns
| M2 Browning | | United States | 12.7x99mm NATO | M2HB Variant Used | |
| DShK | | Soviet Union | 12.7x108mm | DShKM Variant Used | |
Grenade systems
| M67 grenade | | United States | Mass 14 oz (400 g) Length 3.53 in (90 mm) Diameter 2.5 in (64 mm). | | |
| Mark 2 "Pineapple" Fragmentation Hand/Rifle Grenade | | United States | Mass About 1 lb 5 oz (600 g) depending upon filling Length 3.5 inches (89 mm) body 4.5 inches (110 mm) overall Diameter 2.3 inches (58 mm) | | |
| M18 smoke grenade | | United States | Mass 19 oz (540 g) Length 5.75 in (146 mm) Diameter 2.50 in (64 mm) Filling weight 11.4 oz (320 g) Detonation mechanism Pyrotechnic M201A1 Pull-ring delay Igniter (1.0–2.3 seconds). | | |
Grenade Launchers
| M203 | | United States | 40x46mm Grenade | Under-Barrel Grenade Launcher used with M4 | |
| Mk 19 grenade launcher | | United States | 40 mm grenade launcher | Many are turret on M1151a1 and M1043\1044 Humvee vehicles. | 50 delivered in 2016 by United States and 200 delivered in 2018. |
| Beretta GLX160 | | Italy | 40X46mm Grenade | Under-Barrel Grenade Launcher used with Beretta ARX160 | |
Land mine systems
| TM-57 anti-tank mine | | Soviet Union | Diameter: 305 mm Height With MVM-583 fuze: 108 mm With MVSh-46 tilt rod fuze: 260 mm Activation pressure: 120–450 kF (21 kg tilt pressure) Weight Full assembly: 8.6 kg Charge: 5.7 | The TM-57 mine is a large, circular Soviet metal-cased blast anti-tank mine. It can either be triggered by a pressure or a tilt-rod fuze. | A PBS report in December 2025 specifically mentioned LAF forces using TM-57 mines in their operations, highlighting their large explosive content. Context: These mines are deployed for defense and to counter heavy threats, often in areas where armed groups like Hezbollah operate, as seen in recent seizures of bunkers. |
| TM-62M anti-tank mine | | Soviet Union | Diameter: 305 mm Height With MVM-583 fuze: 108 mm With MVSh-46 tilt rod fuze: 260 mm Activation pressure: 120–450 kF (21 kg tilt pressure) Weight Full assembly: 8.6 kg Charge: 5.7 kg (TNT). | | The TM-46 mine is a large, circular, metal-cased Soviet anti-tank mine. It uses either a pressure or tilt-rod fuze, which is screwed into the top. Anti-tank mines with this type of fuze were capable of inflicting much more damage to armored vehicles, when compared to a typical anti-personnel mine. |
| TMA-3 anti-tank mine TMA-4 anti-tank mine TMA-5 anti-tank mine | | Yugoslavia | TMA-3 mine: Diameter: 265 mm Height (with fuze): 110 mm Weight: 7 kg Explosive content: 6.5 kg of TNT Operating pressure: 180 kg TMA-4 mine:Diameter: 284 mm Height (with fuse): 110 mm Weight: 6 kg Explosive content: 5.5 kg of TNT Operating pressure: 100 to 200 kg TMA-5 mine:Length: 300 mm Width: 275 mm Height: 110 mm Weight: 6.6 kg Explosive content: 5.5 kg of TNT Operating pressure: 100 to 300 kg. | | |
| M6A1 anti-tank mine | | United States | Diameter: 13 inches (330 mm) Height: 3.6 inches (91 mm) with arming plug Weight: 20 pounds (9.1 kg) Explosive content: 12 pounds (5.4 kg) of TNT Operating pressure: 350 pounds (160 kg) | | |
| M18A1 Claymore anti-personnel mine | | United States | 3.5 lb (1.6 kg) Length 8.5 in (216 mm) Width 1.5 in (38 mm) Height 4.9 in (124 mm) Caliber .125, or 1/8-inch (3.2 mm) diameter steel balls, about 700 per unit Muzzle velocity 3,995 ft/s (1,218 m/s) Effective firing range 160 ft (50 m) Maximum firing range 820 ft (250 m) Sights Peep sight on early models, later a knife edge sight Filling C-4 Filling weight 24 oz (680 g) Detonation mechanism Blasting Cap Assembly M4 | | |
| M7A1 anti-tank mine | | United States | Weight: 2.2 kg Explosive content: 1.62 kg of Tetryl Length: 178 mm Width: 114 mm Height: 64 mm Operating pressure: 60 to 110 kg | | |
| M15 anti-tank mine | | United States | Weight: 14.3 kg Explosive content: 10.3 kg of Composition B Diameter: 333 mm Height: 150 mm Operating pressure: 160 to 340 kg (for the M603 pressure fuze) | | |
| M19 anti-tank mine | | United States | Weight: 12.56 kg Explosive content: 9.53 kg of Composition B Length: 332 mm Width: 332 mm Height: 94 mm Operating pressure: 118 to 226 kg (although possibly as low as 90 kg). | | |
Anti-Tank Weapons (Unguided)
| RPG-7 | | Soviet Union | 40mm Grenade | | |
| RPG-29 | | Russia | 105 mm Rocket-propelled grenade launcher | | Captured from Hezbollah and Palestinian factions. Documented in images in anti-tank regiment museum in 2025. |
| M72 LAW | | United States | 66mm | | |
| Mk 153 SMAW | | United States | 83.5mm | | The Lebanese Armed Forces received a batch of 1,000 SMAW-D and AT4-CS unguided anti-tank weapon systems from the United States in the year 2007. This delivery was part of an accelerated U.S. military assistance program to strengthen Lebanon's internal security capabilities. |
| AT4 | | Sweden | 84mm | Roughly 1,000 pieces purchased. | In 2007 in and 2013The Lebanese Armed Forces received a batch of AT4-CS and 480 delivered by United States in 2014. |
| M67 Recoilless Rifle | | United States | 90mm | 8 Launchers | |
| M40 Recoilless Rifle | | United States | 106mm | 113 Launchers, mounted on vehicles | |
| SPG-9 | | Soviet Union | 73mm recoilless rifle | N/A | Captured from Hezbollah and Palestinian factions. Documented in images in anti-tank regiment museum in 2025. |
Anti-Tank Weapons (Guided)
| MILAN | | France; West Germany | 115mm | | A total of 16 missiles before 2008, 100 additional delivered in June 2008 and 48 delivered in 2015. On March 31, 2021, French embassy made an announcement. The donation is valued at 4.2 million euros (approximately $4.9 million). It includes 50 portable medium-range anti-tank weapons. It also comprises 100 observation and night-shooting cameras. Used by anti-armor regiment. Also used on Humvee vehicles. |
| HOT | | France | 150mm | 244 | The Lebanese Armed Forces (LAF) received 15 VCAC Mephisto anti-tank missile launcher vehicles and 48 HOT 2 missiles, which have a range of 4,000 m. A total of 96 HOT 2 missiles have been delivered with the 10 VAB Mephistos on 27 November 2018. 2010 France provided 50 HOT missiles to arm AS342L Gazelle helicopters provided by the U.A.E. |
| BGM-71 TOW | | United States | 152mm | | Main anti-tank weapon of the Lebanese Armed Forces. It was mainly used during the dawn of the jurds operation in 2017 by the Airborne regiment, but it is also used by other regiments. (200) BGM-71D tube-launched, optically tracked, wire-guided anti-armor missiles, along with their respective launching pads; received on 1 June 2015. The Lebanese army announced on Thursday, 9 November 2017. The Logistic Brigade received, at Rafik Hariri International Airport as part of the US aid offered to the LAF, a number of TOW II anti-armor rockets and MK82 bombs along with their accessories. |
| 9M133 Kornet | | Russia Iran | 152mm | N/A | First documented use in 2025, during training. Most likely to be Iranian unlicensed Dehlavieh copy units captured from Hezbollah and Palestinian factions. |

== Individual equipment ==
| Name | Image | Origin | Type | Notes | Reference |
Combat helmets
| ECH | | United States | Combat Helmet | | Standard issue helmet of the Lebanese army replaced the Personnel Armor System for Ground Troops helmet in 2018 |
| MICH | | United States | Combat Helmet | | Used by the Lebanese Special Operations Command and some other units |
| ACH | | United States | Combat Helmet | | Used by the Lebanese Special Operations Command and some other units |
| Ops-Core FAST | | United States | Combat Helmet | | Main users are the Lebanese Special Operations Command and the intervention regiments also seen used by conventional brigades |
| OR-201 | | Israel | Combat Helmet | | Limited use by the "Strike Force", claimed from the SLA withdrawal. |
Camouflage patterns
| MultiCam | | United States | Camouflage Pattern for Bulletproof vests, combat helmets, uniforms | | Operational Camouflage Pattern based on MultiCam predecessor, Standard issued uniform for all branches replaced U.S. Woodland on 21 November 2017. |
| M81 Woodland | | United States | Camouflage pattern for helmet covers, plate carriers and uniforms | | Woodland camouflage was replaced by MultiCam during 2017, however some individuals still use them. |
| Universal Camouflage Pattern | | United States | Camouflage Pattern | | Lebanese Marine Commandos use both local versions and surplus UCP ACU uniforms from U.S. Army. |
| MARPAT desert pattern | | United States | Camouflage Pattern | | Used by the Airborne Regiment |
| MARPAT Woodland | | United States | Camouflage Pattern | | Used by the Commando Regiment |
| Lizard (Camouflage) | | France | Camouflage Pattern | | Used by the Moukafaha Regiment |
| Black Camouflage | | Lebanon | Camouflage Pattern | | Used by the Lebanese Navy SEALs Regiment |
Vests
| Columbus "M16 Vest" | | Lebanon | Plate Carrier | Locally made CIRAS vest replica or bought from a third-party company. | |
| Combat Integrated Releasable Armor System | | United States | Plate Carrier | | |
| Interceptor Body Armor | | United States | Plate Carrier | | |
| MED-ENG EOD 9 | | United States; Canada | Bomb Suit | | the operations and training of the Lebanese Army Combat Engineering Regiment (فوج الهندسة). |
| Metal detector | | Germany; Australia | The machine highlighted in the selected region is a military-grade landmine metal detector used for humanitarian demining and explosive ordnance disposal (EOD). | | the operations and training of the Lebanese Army Combat Engineering Regiment (فوج الهندسة). |
Personal Protection Equipment
| MPact Mechanix Gloves | | United States | Tactical Impact gloves | | |
| Oakley Gloves | | United States | Tactical Impact gloves | | |
Weapons Optics and Nightvision
| Holosun | | United States; China | Red dot and Holographic sight | | |
| EOTech | | United States | Holographic weapon sight | | |
| Aimpoint CompM4 | | United States | Aimpoint | | |
| Advanced Combat Optical Gunsight | | United States | Telescopic sight | | |
| AN/PEQ-2 | | United States | IR laser and illumination | | |
| AN/PEQ 15 | | United States | IR laser and illumination | | |
| AN/PEQ 16 | | United States | IR Laser and illumination | | |
| AN/PVS-9 | N/A | United States | Night-vision device | | Seen in use with Little md530f+ helicopter pilots of the Lebanese Air Force. |
| AN/PVS-14 | | United States | Night-vision device | | |
| AN/PVS-7 | | United States | Night-Vision device | | |
| AN/PVS-23 | | United States | Night-Vision device | | Very rare, however confirmed and documented to be in use with Lebanese Special Forces (Unit is unknown) |
Communications Equipment
| Sepura STP9000 Tetra | | United Kingdom | VHF/UHF Radio | | |
| RDO SPR (Harris RF-7800S Secure Personal Radio) | | United States | UHF Radio | | |
| L3 Harris AN/PRC-117 | | United States | Man-portable, tactical software-defined combat-net radio Multi-band networking manpack radio | | |
| L3 Harris AN/PRC-152 | | United States | Man-portable, tactical software-defined combat-net radio | | |

== Air defense ==
| Name | Image | Origin | Type | Notes | Reference |
MANPADS
| 9K32 Strela-2 | | Soviet Union | Man-Portable Air-Defense System | NATO Code: "SA-7 Grail". The only Surface-To-Air Missile in service with the Lebanese Armed Forces. No more than 50 in use | |
Towed AA
| Zastava M55 | | Yugoslavia | 3x20mm Anti-Aircraft Gun | 20 in use | |
| ZPU | | Soviet Union | 2/4x14.5 × 114 mm Anti-Aircraft Gun | ZPU-2 and ZPU-4 Versions in use. Several hundreds of guns are in use. Many are also mounted on M113 vehicles | |
| ZU-23-2 | | Soviet Union | 2x23x152mm Anti-Aircraft Gun | Several hundreds units used | |
SPAAG
| M113 as technical w/ZU-23-2 | | Soviet Union; Lebanon; United States | Improvised Self-Propelled Anti-Aircraft Weapon | M113 Modified locally. A total of 57 units used, original image | |
| ZSU-23-4 Shilka | | Soviet Union | 4x23x152mm Self-Propelled Anti-Aircraft Weapon | Former PLO vehicles operated by the Lebanese Army (2), Lebanese Forces (3), Al-Mourabitoun (3), Amal Movement (3 seized from the Al-Mourabitoun), and People's Liberation Army (2 loaned by Libya) during the Lebanese Civil War. at least 2 operate by the Lebanese commondo regiment .(maghaweer) | |

== Artillery ==
| Name | Image | Origin | Quantity | Type | Notes | Reference |
Self-Propelled Artillery
| M109 howitzer | | United States | 12 | 155mm Self-Propelled Howitzer | | Delivered in 2015 from Jordan. M109A3 Variant operate by the 1st Artillery regiment. |
Artillery Support Vehicles
| M992 Field Artillery Ammunition Support Vehicle | | United States | 10 | Field Artillery Ammunition Support Vehicle | A2 Variant, used for M109 howitzers | delivered in 2017 by United States. |
Artillery Ammunition
| M712 Copperhead | | United States | 1000+ | 155mm Guided Artillery Shell | | The Lebanese Army received 827 Copperhead shells as part of a U.S. aid package in 2018 and used them against ISIS forces in the Qalamoun offensive. The shells are fired from 155mm howitzers and require a laser designator team to guide them to the target. |
Towed Artillery
| M101 howitzer | | United States | 15 | 105mm Field Gun | | |
| M102 howitzer | | United States | 10 | 105mm Field Gun | | |
| M114 howitzer | | United States | 18 | 155mm Howitzer | | |
| M198 howitzer | | United States | 219 | 155mm Howitzer | Standard Howitzer of the Lebanese Armed Forces | LAF operated 36 Howitzers since the 80s.in 2008 the United States supply of 41 198 Howitzers. in January, 2010 received 30 M-198 Howitzers . 72 M-198 Howitzers on February 8, 2015. 40 M-198 Howitzers in 16 august 2016. |
| 122mm howitzer 2A18 (D-30) | | Soviet Union | 9 | 122mm Field Gun | | |
| 122mm howitzer M1938 (M-30) | | Soviet Union | 26 | 122mm Howitzer | | |
| 130mm towed field gun M1954 (M-46) | | Soviet Union | 15 | 130mm Field Gun | | |
| 152mm towed gun-howitzer M1955 (D-20) | | Soviet Union | 18 | 152mm Howitzer | Seen During the Lebanese Civil War | |
| 2A36 Giatsint-B | | Soviet Union | 6 | 152mm Howitzer | | |
| Obusier de 155mm Modéle 50 | | France | 14 | 155mm Howitzer | | |
Multiple Rocket Launchers
| Grad-K | | Soviet Union; Russia | 6 | 122mm Multiple Rocket Launcher | The 2B26 machine is a Russian modification of the original BM-21 launcher. It was first produced in 2011. The system is mounted on a KamAZ-5350 chassis. Donated by Russia in 2016 | |
| BM-11 | | North Korea; Lebanon; United States | 5 | 122mm Multiple Rocket Launcher | Captured from Hezbollah. Locally assembled by Hezbollah and mounted on a M35A2 truck of the 2nd Artillery Regiment. | |
Mortar Carriers
| M106 mortar carrier | | United States | N/A | 107mm Mortar Carrier | It saw action during the Lebanese Civil War | |
Mortars
| M224 mortar | | United States | N/A | 60mm Light Mortar | | Delivered by United States from 2014 to 2017. |
| M29 mortar | | United States | N/A | 81mm Medium Mortar | | Delivered by United States from 2014 to 2017. |
| M252 mortar | | United States | N/A | 81mm Medium Mortar | | Delivered by United States from 2014 to 2017. |
| M120 120 mm mortar | | United States; Israel | N/A | 120mm Heavy Mortar | | Some captured from SLA withdrawal of south Lebanon.Delivered by United States from 2014 to 2017. |
| M30 mortar | | United States | N/A | 107 Heavy Mortar | | |
| 2B14 Podnos | | Soviet Union | N/A | 82mm Medium Mortar | | |
| Mortier 120mm Rayé Tracté Modèle F1 | | France | 24 | 120mm Heavy Mortar | | 24 delivered in 2012. |
| Soltam M-65 | | Israel | N/A | 120mm Heavy Mortar | | Captured after the SLA withdrawal |
| Soltam M-66 | | Israel | N/A | 160mm Heavy Mortar | | Captured after the SLA withdrawal |

== Vehicles ==
| Name | Image | Origin | Quantity | Type | Notes | Reference |
Main Battle Tanks
| M60A3 | | United States | 10 | Main Battle Tank | Operate by the 1st Armored Regiment. Four of which were equipped with the TTS and six with the IFCS; | Delivered from Jordan in 2009. |
| M48A5 MOLF | | United States | 60+ | Main Battle Tank | This variant Features a M68 105mm gun, all metric-measurement M16 FCS, and coaxial machine gun upgraded to M219. | |
| T-54/T-55 | | Soviet Union | 47 T-55; 185 T-54 as of 2024. | Main Battle Tank | Main Battle Tank of the Lebanese Armed Forces. Variants used are: T-54A, T-54B, T-54-2, T-54-3, T-55AM, Tiran 55 | |
Infantry Fighting Vehicles
| M2A2 Bradley | | United States | 32 | Tracked Infantry Fighting Vehicle | Used by airborne regiment (Al Moujawkal) | delivered in 2017–2018 by United States. |
| AIFV-B-C25 | | United States | 16 | Tracked Infantry Fighting Vehicle | Operate by commando regiment (Al Maghaweer), marine commando regiment (Maghaweer al Bãhr), airborne regiment (Al Moujawkal)and seen with the 2nd and 3rd Land border regiments in live fire exercise in 2025 and 2026. | Lebanon received 16 AIFVs and 12 M-113 ambulances in early December 2009, purchased from Belgium. |
Armoured Personnel Carriers
| M113 | | United States | 1300+ | Light Tracked Armoured Personnel Carrier | Main armoured fighting vehicle along with the Humvee. Operate by all eleven brigades, all six intervention regiments, all four land regiments, airborne regiment (Al Moujawkal), marine commando regiment (Maghaweer al Bãhr), commando regiment (Maghaweer). Variants used are M113A1, M113A2, M113A3, M113 Kasman, M113 OPFOR and more. | additional 200 vehicles delivered by United States in 2013. 30 in 2015,62 in 2024 delivered by Jordan and 26 donated by Greece in 2026 |
| Véhicule de l'Avant Blindé | | France | 90+ | 4x4 Armoured Personnel Carrier | Operate by the commando regiment (Maghaweer), marine commando regiment (Maghaweer al Bãhr), airborne regiment (Al Moujawkal, military police, and all 6 intervention regiment's. | In june 2011 France transferred 8 VAB armored vehicles that had previously served within the French contingent of UNIFIL. 20 in 12 july 2024, 39 in 31 march. all Vab vehicles donated by France |
Tank Destroyers
| VAB Mephisto | | France | 35 | 4x4 Tank Destroyer | Armed with HOT Missiles | Operate by the anti tank regiment . |
| Humvee M1046 w/TOW; Humvee w/MILAN | | United States | N/A | 4x4 Tank Destroyer carries 2 types of ATGM's | 2 Versions, armed with TOW or MILAN missiles | Operate by the anti tank regiment . |
| M113 | | United States | N/A | Tracked Tank Destroyer | Armed with TOW missiles | Operate by the anti tank regiment. |
| Polaris Ranger | | United States | N/A | 4x4 Tank Destroyer | | The Lebanese army has been using Polaris Ranger UTV armed with TOW missiles. It was mainly used during the dawn of the jurds operation in 2017 by anti tank regiment, Airborne regiment (Al moujawkal), Lebanese commondo regiment (maghaweer). |
Infantry Mobility Vehicles and MRAP'S
| RWMIK Land Rover | | United Kingdom | 100 | MRAP | Operate by all 4 land border regiments former British Army RWMIK+ | supplied by the United Kingdom as donations to the Lebanese Army in 2021. |
| TM-170 Barracuda | | Germany; Republic of Korea | 10 | Infantry Mobility Vehicle/MRAP. | operate by 2 and 5 intervention regiments in the south Lebanon. | The United Nations Interim Force In Lebanon (UNIFIL) announced on 1 December 2021 that South Korea has handed over ten Barracuda 4x4 APCs to the Lebanese Armed Forces (LAF) |
| Nimr | | United Arab Emirates | At least 1 | Infantry Mobility Vehicle | | Possibly put out of service. In 2011.The Lebanese Army received the vehicle directly from the manufacturer, NIMR Automotive (now a subsidiary of the UAE's EDGE Group), as part of a military evaluation program. At the time, the UAE was marketing the vehicle both locally and regionally. This specific unit was provided to test its performance, maneuverability, and engine efficiency across Lebanon's rugged mountainous terrain. It was subsequently placed at the disposal of the Airborne Regiment (Mouhawkal). |
High-Mobility Multi-Purpose Vehicles
| Humvee | | United States | 1600+ Vehicles of all variants | 4x4 Infantry Mobility Vehicle/Utility Multi-Purpose Vehicle | Main Armoured Fighting Vehicle of the Lebanese Armed Forces along with the M113. Multiple Variants Used. 1300+ (M998/M1025/M1046/M1035/M1026/M1043/M1043 ACAV/M1044/M1045); 243 (M1151)and 210 (M1152)and 3+ (M1065a1) | The LAF received armored M1151 Humvees High Mobility Multipurpose Wheeled Vehicles from United States, 24 (2011),10(2015), 59 (2016),150(2019). also the Lebanese Army received 150 M1152 HMMWVs vehicles as a donation from the United States in August 2022.and The Lebanese Army received a donation of 13 Humvee military vehicles including M1161a1 and M997A3 HMMWV (Humvee) tactical ambulance. from the United States in November 2022 and in the September 2026 received 47 m1152.the Lebanese army received many other versions of HMMWVs on 2007 to 2015 |
Medium Tactical Vehicles|Oshkosh FMTV
| Oshkosh FMTV | | United States | 57 at least | 6x6 Multirole Truck | Used for humanitarian relief, troop and cargo transport, both armoured and unarmoured versions used | 31 M1084A1P2 fmtv deliverd by United States in 3-March 2021,11 1083 A1P2 fmtv delivered in 7- November 2022,15 1083 A1P2 fmtv delivered in 19-May 2023. |
| Oshkosh FMTV | | United States | 15 | 6×6, MTV Cargo, Long Wheelbase Cargo (LWB) | | The Lebanese Army on Tuesday of 29 September 2026.received 47 military Humvees and five trucks M1085a2 (5 ton) as part of the U.S. assistance programs allocated to the Lebanese Armed Forces, the army said. in Friday, October 16, 2026 10 trucks M1085a2 received as part of US aid programs for the army. |
Reconnaissance Vehicles
| Panhard AML | | France | 55 | Reconnaissance Vehicle | Operate the Lebanese commondo regiment (maghaweer) and the 4 intervention. | Possibly put out of service. |
Utility Vehicles
| FIAT Nuova Campagnola 1107 / AR76 | | Italy | 63 | Jeep | Fiat AR 76 Top hard and soft | Donated by Italy in 2010;limited use |
| M151 ¼-ton 4×4 utility truckA2 | | United States | 50+ | Jeep | Limited use | |
| CUCV commercial Utility Cargo Vehicle | | United States | N/A | Sport-Utility Vehicle | Variants used are M1008/M1009/M1010 Ambulance/M1028/M880/M882/M883/M885/M886 Ambulance | |
| Land Rover Defender 90, 110 | | United Kingdom; Malaysia | 350+ | Jeep/Cargo Transport Vehicle | Used by all Lebanese army troops | Supplied by the United Kingdom. In 2026, Malaysian UN peacekeeping forces, MALBATT agreed to donate some of the Land Rover Defender Fitted For Radio (FFR) to LAF. |
| Land Rover Defender 110 | | United Kingdom | At least 37 | Vehicle Type: Full-size SUV / Four-Wheel Drive (4WD) | | Beirut, January 29, 2026 The Lebanese Army Thursday received 37 vehicles provided by the State of Qatar through the Qatar Fund for Development (QFFD), representing the first tranche of an overall grant comprising 162 vehicles designated to support the Lebanese military institution. |
| Land Rover Perentie | | United Kingdom; Australia | 10 | Jeep/Cargo Transport Vehicle | | Donated by Australia in 2020 |
| Kia KM450 Series K131 jeep | | Republic of Korea | 27 | Kia KM450\KM451 and K131 jeep light Utility/Cargo transport truck | | Donated by South Korea in 2018–2020 |
| Toyota Land Cruiser (J70) | | Japan | 100+ | Light Utility Vehicle | 40 Series and 70 Series. J12 also used.J12 and Land Cruiser HZJ75P | J12 and Land Cruiser HZJ75P are donated by United Nations Interim Force Lebanon in 2025 also some are Donated by UN MALBATT peacekeeping forces starting in October 2026 until January 2027. |
| Nissan Patrol Y62 | | Japan | 6 | Vehicle Type: Full-size SUV / Four-Wheel Drive (4WD) | | • in 17 July 2026 ,The Lebanese Armed Forces received a donation of vehicles and support from the Italian Military Technical Committee for Lebanon (MTC4L).The handover ceremony took place at the 8th Infantry Brigade command. |
| Toyota Fortuner | | Japan | At least 2 | Vehicle Type: Full-size SUV / Four-Wheel Drive (4WD) | | Donated by UN MALBATT peacekeeping forces starting in October 2026 until January 2027. |
| Beijing BJ80 | | China | 60 | Jeep / Light Utility Vehicle | | Donated by China in 2021 |
| Volkswagen Transporter (T5) | | Germany | N/A | Van | | |
| Fiat Ducato | | Italy | 3 | Van | | Donated by Italy in 2022 |
| Iveco Daily | | Italy | 2 | Van | | Donated by Italy in 2022 |
Buses
| Iveco Crossway Pro EEV E6 | | Italy | 5 | Bus | | Donated by Italy in 2022 |
| Medium bus Golden Dragon XML 6952 | | China | 60 | Bus | | |
Side by Side & Utility Task Vehicles
| Kawasaki Brute Force 750 4×4i | | Japan | 6 | Atv Light tactical All-terrain vehicle | | Donated by Japan in 2009 |
| Polaris Sportsman 500/MV850 | | United States | 12 | Atv Light tactical All-terrain vehicle | | On March 23, 2009, the LAF took delivery of 40 HMMWVs, and 9 sport utility vehicles from the US.9 Polaris Sportsman 500 delivered by United States in 2009.Polaris MV850 sportsman seen with the Lebanese army troops in 2017 fajr El jouroud battle. |
| Can-Am Outlander | | Canada | At least 2 | Atv 1000 Pro 6x6 1seter. Light tactical All-terrain vehicle | | Donated by UN MALBATT peacekeeping forces starting in October 2026 until January 2027. |
| Polaris MRZR D2/D4 | | United States | N/A | Light tactical All-terrain vehicle | | Operated by the airborne regiment (Al moujawkal)، the Lebanese commondo regiment (maghaweer)، Lebanese marine commando (Maghaweer al Bãhr), all 4 Land border regiments, the anti tank regiment. some troops are using mrzr alpha in the south, Deliverd by United States. |
| Polaris Inc | | United States | N/A | Light tactical All-terrain vehicle | | 45 (UTVs) Polaris ranger 1000cc Donated by Canada in 2022–2023.for Land Border Regiments: 1st, 2nd, 3rd, and 4th Regiments. • The Commando Regiment (Fouj al-Maghaweer). • The Anti-Tank Regiment. • Intervention Regiments: 1st, 2nd, 3rd, 4th, 5th, and 6th Regiments. • The Ski and Mountain The Lebanese army have other version of utvs. |
Motorcycles
| Yamaha XT500 | | Japan | 10+ | Motorcycle | | Used by marine commando regiment (Maghaweer al Bãhr) |
| Suzuki Burgman 650cc | | Japan | 10+ | Motorcycle | | Used by Logistics Brigade |
| Honda FSC600D (2002) | | Japan | 10+ | Motorcycle | | Used by Logistics Brigade |
Snowmobile and Arctic Mobility Vehicles
| Ski-doo | | Canada | 32 | Snowmobile | | Donated by Canada in 2018, used by The Ski and Mountain. |
| Polaris Ranger XP1000 | | United States | 24 | Light Tracked All-terrain vehicle (Innsbruck-snow mobile) | | Donated by Canada in 2022–2023 |
| Snow grooming | | United States; Switzerland | 1 | Half-Tracked Snowmobile Ratrak | | Used by The Ski and Mountain. |
Medical Evacuation Vehicles
| Humvee Maxi-Ambulance | | United States | N/A | Field ambulance | | Delivered by United States in 2022. |
| M113 | | United States | 12 | Tracked armoured ambulance vehicle | | Lebanon received 16 AIFVs and 12 M-113 ambulances in early December 2009, purchased from Belgium. |
| M113 | | United States | N/A | M113A3 Medevac | | |
| Véhicule de l'Avant Blindé | | France | N/A | 4x4 Ambulance | | Delivered by France in 2026 |
| Polaris Ranger 4×4 | | United States | 24 | Fire & rescue Side by side | | Delivered by Canada in 2022/23 |
| CUCV Ambulance Commercial Utility Cargo Vehicle | | United States | N/A | 4x4 Ambulance | | |
| Mercedes-Benz G-Class | | Austria; West Germany; Germany | 20 | 4x4/6x6 Ambulance | The Lebanese Army operates 20 G-wagon. | donated by the Royal Dutch Army as ambulances in 2017. |
| Land Rover Perentie | | United Kingdom; Australia | 4 | 6x6 Ambulance | | Donated from Australia in 2020 |
| Fiat Ducato | | Italy | 24; 1 | Ambulance Van | | Donated by Italy in 2010 and 2025 |
| Mercedes-Benz Sprinter | | Germany; Argentina | 1 | Ambulance Van | | Donated by Italy in 2024. The donation is supported by MTC4L |
| Toyota Land Cruiser | | Japan | 6 | 4×4 ambulance | | The European Union Handed Over 6 Ambulances to the Lebanese Armed Forces in 2024. |
| Nissan Urvan | | Japan | 3 | 4×4 ambulance | | Donation from The European Union in 2026. |
Unarmoured Engineering Vehicles
| Tata Hitachi Shinrai | | India | 5 | Backhoe loader | | Donation from The European Union in 2026. |
| Mobile carne | | Germany | 3 | Liebherr LTM 1200-5.1 Crane | | Donation from The European Union in 2026. |
| Dieci pegasus 40.25 | | Italy | 4 | Rotating telehandlders | | Donation from The European Union in 2026. |
| Bobcat Company | | United States | 5 | Skid steer loader | | Donation from The European Union in 2026. |
| Dongfeng | | China | 6 | 4x2 cargo truck chassis mounted with a hydraulic telescopic boom crane (specifically a Chengli CLW brand or XCMG system). | | Donation from The European Union in 2026. |
| Volvo EC | | Sweden | N/A | Excavator | | |
| M816 Wrecker | | United States | N/A | Recovery Truck | Medium wrecker, 5 Ton 6×6 | |
| Caterpillar D9 | | United States | N/A | Bulldozer | | |
| Caterpillar | | United States | 4 | Caterpillar(Cat) F-Series Wheeled Excavator. | | Delivered by United States in 2013. |
| Caterpillar 980C | | United States | N/A | Wheel Loader | | |
| Caterpillar 950 | | United States | N/A | Wheel Loader | | |
| Caterpillar 973D | | United States | 5 | Track Loader | | Delivered by United States in 2011. |
| CASE 821 C | | United States | 10 | Wheel loader | | Donated by France in 2025. |
| Dynapac | | Sweden | 10 | Road Roller | | Donated by France in 2025. |
Armoured Engineering Vehicles
| ArmaTrac | | United Kingdom | 1 | Mine-Clearing Vehicle | | Delivered by United States in 2006.Armtrac75 Minesweeper |
| Mini MineWolf | | United Kingdom | 1 | Mine-Clearing Vehicle | | Donation by Norway government in 2005. Minecat Minesweeper 230 |
| Caterpillar D9 | | United States | 2 | Armoured Bulldozer | Caterpillar D9N | Used in nahrr El bared battle in 2007 |
| JCB 426 | | United Kingdom | 4 | Armoured Front well loader outfitted with specialized military camouflage. | | Donation from The European Union in 2026. |
| M578 Light Recovery Vehicle | | United States | 4 | Armoured Recovery Vehicle | | |
| M88 Recovery Vehicle | | United States | 1 M88A1; 2 M88A2 | Armoured Recovery Vehicle | Standard Recovery Vehicle | The Lebanese Army one M88A1 in 2009 and received two M88A2 Hercules recovery vehicles from the United States in a delivery at the Port of Beirut in May 2019 |
Unmanned Ground Vehicles
| URANE 6 | | Russia | 1 | Unmanned Ground Vehicle (UGV) / Robotic Mine Countermeasures System. | | This specific unit belongs to the Engineering Regiment of the Lebanese Armed Forces (LAF), captured in the image during operation "Dawn of the Outskirts" (Fajr al-Jurood). |
| Foster-Miller TALON | | United States | N/A | Unmanned Ground Vehicle | Tracked military robot. The SWORDS system allows soldiers to fire small arms weapons by remote control from as far as over 3,937 feet (1,200 meters) away. This example is fitted with an M249 SAW. | |
| iRobot PackBot 510 | | United States | N/A | Unmanned Ground Vehicle | Unmanned demining vehicle | |
| Dragon Runner | | United States | N/A | Unmanned Ground Vehicle | Military robot built for urban combat | |
| UGV Interoperability Profile | | United States | N/A | Unmanned Ground Vehicle | Robotics and Autonomous Systems – Ground IOP (RAS-G IOP) | |
Communications Vehicles
| M577 command post carrier | | United States | N/A | Command Vehicle | The Lebanese Army and the Republican Guard operate the M577A1. Part of the US foreign arm sale to the LAF | |
Trucks
| Astra HD9 | | Italy | N/A | Tank Transporter | | |
| Iveco ACM 80/90; Iveco ACL 90 | | Italy | 16 | 4x4 Tactical Truck | | Donated by Italy in 2011. |
| Iveco Trakker | | Italy | N/A | Tank Transporter | Seen during the military parade in Beirut 2017 | |
| Iveco Eurocargo | | Italy | 26 | 4x4 Multirole Truck | | Donated from Canada 4 cargo transport and 1 fuel tanker and 1 water tanker July 2018 and 20 cargo transport in August 2018. |
| Iveco ACTL | | Italy | 1 | Multirole Tactical Truck | | 1 tanker truck donated by Italy in February 2022 |
| Astra HD6 | | Italy | N/A | Tank Transporter | | |
| International DuraStar | | United States | N/A | Vehicle Transporter | International 4000 series | |
| M35 series 2½-ton 6×6 cargo truck | | United States | 200; 20 | General Cargo; Shop Van | Including M292 Expansible Van Truck; Support Vehicle For M109 Howitzers | |
| M54 5-ton 6x6 truck | | United States | N/A | Dump Truck | | |
| Navistar 7000-MV | | United States | N/A | Troop Transport | Seen in 2011 | |
| M939 series 5-ton 6x6 truck | | United States | 38 | General Cargo | | In the context of the United States aid program dedicated to the Lebanese Army, the Logistic Brigade received in the port of Beirut vehicles composed of M925 and M925A1 5-Tons cargo trucks on May 5, 2014. |
| Oshkosh M1070 | | United States | 8 | Tank Transporter | | Delivered by United States in 2018,Operate by the airborne regiment (Al moujawkal) |
| M915 | | United States | 15 | Tank Transporter | | M915 Tractor with 15 M872/M872A1 Flatbed trailer delivered by United States of America |
| Renault Trucks T | | France | N/A | heavy-duty commercial truck. | | Donation from The European Union in 2026. |
| K711 | | Republic of Korea | 50 | 6x6 Multirole Truck | | Donated by South Korea in 2016 |
| Sinotruk HOWO | | China | 40 | Dump Truck | | Donated by China in 2021 |
| Volvo NL10/NL12 | | Sweden | N/A | Tractor Truck | | |
| Kamaz-4310 | | Soviet Union; Russia | 100 | General Cargo | | |
| DAF YA 4440/4442 | | Netherlands | 130 | General Cargo | | 100 donated by Netherlands in 2008 and 15 in 2019 and 15 in 2021. |
| Renault midliner 210 | | France | N/A | 4×4 cargo trucks | | Donated by United Nations Interim Force Lebanon (UNIFIL) in 2025 |
| Steyr 680M | | Austria Greece | 20 | 4×4 cargo trucks | | 20 Steyr 680M and 26 M113 Donated by Greece in 2026. |
| HICOM Handalan | | Malaysia | At least 10+ | 3 tonnes 4×4 cargo truck | | Donated by UN MALBATT peacekeeping forces starting in October 2026 until January 2027. |

== Engineering and other vehicles ==
- Minecat 230 Minesweeper
- Armtrac 75 Minesweeper
- Mini MineWolf
- Bulldozers (Armoured & Unarmoured)
- M52
- M813
- M818
- M543 Wrecker
- M49A2 Fuel tank truck
- GMC TopKick
- Jeep Wagoneer Signal truck
- Hino Trucks
- Nissan Buses

== Military simulations ==
- Janus
- Engagement Skills Trainer 2000
- TOW anti-tank simulators
- Milan anti-tank simulators
- VAB Mephisto simulators

== See also ==
- List of former equipment of the Lebanese Armed Forces
- List of weapons of the Lebanese Civil War
- Cedar rocket
