= TMAS =

TMAS may refer to:

- Telemedical Maritime Assistance Service
- Taylor Manifest Anxiety Scale

== See also ==
- TMA (disambiguation)
