= TMA-3 =

TMA-3 may be:

- TMA-3 mine
- Soyuz TMA-3, a Russian space exploration mission
- 2,3,4-Trimethoxyamphetamine (TMA-3), a hallucinogenic drug
