= 2,3,6-Trimethoxyphenethylamine =

Clinical data
- Other names: 2,3,6-TMPEA; TMPEA-5; 2C-TMA-5
- ATC code: None

Identifiers
- IUPAC name: 2-(2,3,6-trimethoxyphenyl)ethanamine
- CAS Number: 15806-31-2 3166-84-5 (HCl)
- PubChem CID: 414331
- ChemSpider: 366877

Chemical and physical data
- Formula: C_{11}H_{17}NO_{3}
- Molar mass: 211.261 g·mol^{−1}
- 3D model (JSmol): Interactive image
- SMILES: COC1=C(C(=C(C=C1)OC)OC)CCN
- InChI: InChI=1S/C11H17NO3/c1-13-9-4-5-10(14-2)11(15-3)8(9)6-7-12/h4-5H,6-7,12H2,1-3H3; Key:SOARXDWNNULVNL-UHFFFAOYSA-N

2,3,6-Trimethoxyphenethylamine (2,3,6-TMPEA), also known as TMPEA-5 or as 2C-TMA-5, is a chemical compound of the phenethylamine family related to mescaline (3,4,5-trimethoxyphenethylamine). It is one of the possible positional isomers of trimethoxyphenethylamine and is a positional isomer of mescaline. According to Alexander Shulgin in his book PiHKAL (Phenethylamines I Have Known and Loved), 2,3,6-TMPEA is not known to have ever been tested in humans. It is either a competitive substrate or inhibitor of monoamine oxidase (MAO). The chemical synthesis of 2,3,6-TMPEA has been described. 2,3,6-TMPEA was first described in the scientific literature by J. R. Merchant and A. J. Mountwala in 1958. As a positional isomer of mescaline, it is a Schedule I controlled substance in the United States. The drug is a controlled substance in Canada under phenethylamine blanket-ban language.

== See also ==
- Trimethoxyphenethylamine
- Substituted methoxyphenethylamine
- 2,3,6-Trimethoxyamphetamine (2,3,6-TMA; TMA-5)
- 2C-O (2,4,5-TMPEA)
- Isomescaline (2,3,4-TMPEA)
- ψ-2C-O (2,4,6-TMPEA)
- 2C-TMA-4 (2,3,5-TMPEA)
