= TMA-4 =

TMA-4 may refer to:

- TMA-4 mine
- Soyuz TMA-4, a Russian space exploration mission
- 2,3,5-Trimethoxyamphetamine (TMA-4), a hallucinogenic drug
