= TMA-5 =

TMA-5 may be:

- 2,3,6-Trimethoxyamphetamine (TMA-5), a hallucinogenic drug
- Soyuz TMA-5, a Russian space exploration mission
