= TMA-2 =

TMA-2 may be:

- TMA-2 mine
- Soyuz TMA-2, a Russian space exploration mission
- 2,4,5-Trimethoxyamphetamine (TMA-2), a hallucinogenic drug
- Tycho Magnetic Anomaly-2, from 2001: A Space Odyssey
