= Hawkins grenade =

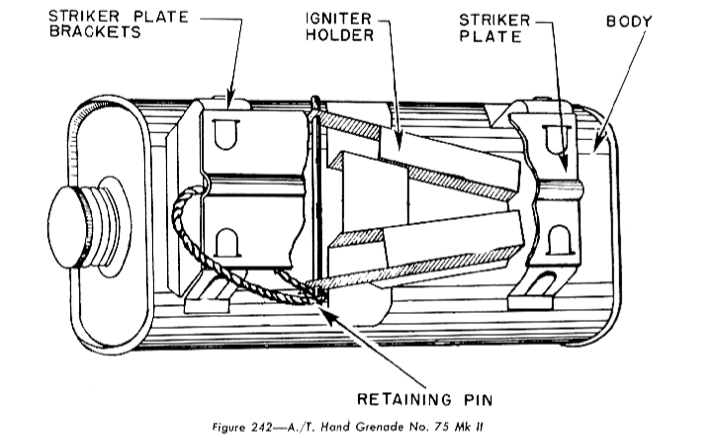
- Diagram of a Hawkins grenade, British Explosive Ordnance, NAVORD OP 1665, Naval Ordnance Systems Command (1946), p.384
- Type: Anti-tank hand grenade/anti-tank mine
- Place of origin: United Kingdom

Service history
- In service: 1942 - 1955
- Used by: United Kingdom, United States, Canada
- Wars: World War II

Production history
- Produced: 1942-?
- Variants: United States M7 anti-tank mine

Specifications
- Mass: 1.02 kilograms (2.2 lb)
- Length: 150 millimetres (5.9 in)
- Width: 75 millimetres (3.0 in)
- Filling: Ammonal/TNT
- Filling weight: 0.45 kilograms (0.99 lb)
- Detonation mechanism: Crush igniter

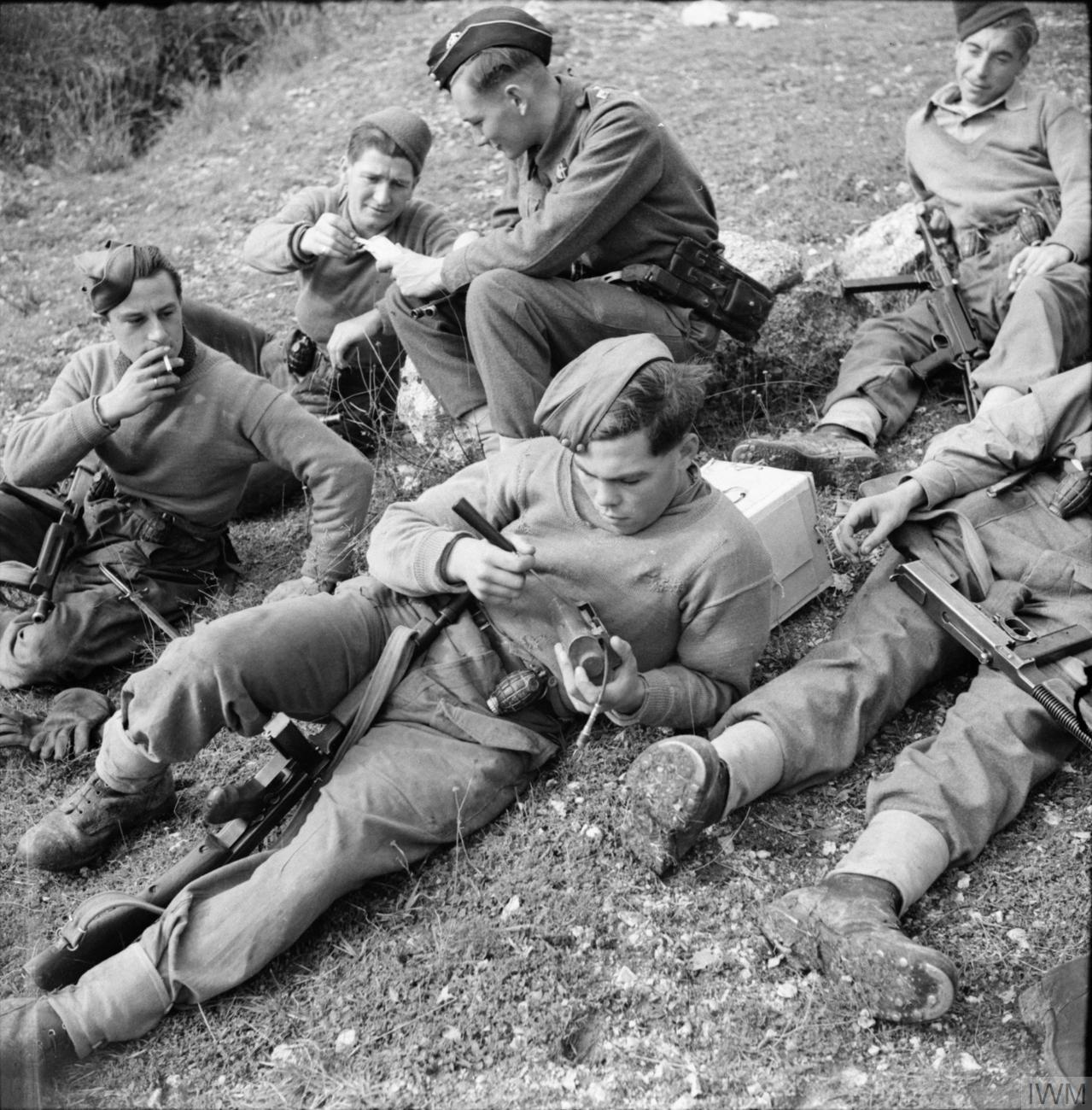
Battle patrol of the 1st East Surreys rest after returning from enemy territory in Italy, 16 December 1943. The soldier in the centre is holding a Hawkins grenade

The Grenade, Hand, Anti-Tank, No. 75, also known as the "Hawkins grenade", was a British anti-tank hand grenade used during World War II. It was one of a number of grenades developed for use by the British Army and Home Guard in the aftermath of the Dunkirk evacuation. The grenade first appeared in 1942, and was designed to be more versatile than previous grenades, such as the No. 73 grenade and the sticky bomb.

It was rectangular, about 150 millimetres (5.9 in) in length and 75 millimetres (3.0 in) in width, containing approximately 0.45 kilograms (0.99 lb) of explosive. When a vehicle drove over the grenade, it cracked a chemical igniter and leaked acid onto a sensitive chemical, which detonated the explosive. Multiple grenades were often used to destroy tanks or disable their tracks, and the grenade could also be used as a demolition charge. It was used by the British Army and the United States Army, with the former using it until 1955 and the latter also creating their own variant, the M7 anti-tank mine.

== Development ==
With the end of the Battle of France and the evacuation of the British Expeditionary Force from the port of Dunkirk between 26 May and 4 June 1940, a German invasion of Great Britain seemed likely. However, the British Army was not well-equipped to defend the country in such an event; in the weeks after the Dunkirk evacuation it could only field twenty-seven divisions. The army was particularly short of anti-tank guns, 840 of which had been left behind in France and only 167 were available in Britain; ammunition was so scarce for the remaining guns that regulations forbade even a single round being used for training purposes.

As a result of these shortcomings, a number of new anti-tank weapons had to be developed to equip the British Army and the Home Guard with the means to repel German armoured vehicles. Many of these were anti-tank hand grenades, large numbers of which could be built in a very short space of time and for a low cost. They included the No. 73 Grenade, which was little more than a Thermos-sized bottle filled with TNT, and the grenade, hand, anti-tank No. 74, also known as the "sticky bomb", which was coated with a strong adhesive and stuck to a vehicle. A more versatile grenade appeared in 1942 in the form of the grenade, hand, anti-tank, No. 75, more commonly known as the "Hawkins grenade", which was designed so that it could be used in a number of roles.

== Design ==
The grenade was rectangular in shape and approximately 150 millimetres (5.9 in) in length and 75 millimetres (3.0 in) in width, and weighed about 1.02 kilograms (2.2 lb). Its explosive content consisted of around 0.45 kilograms (0.99 lb) of blasting explosive, which was usually either ammonal or TNT. On the top of the grenade was a plate, under which the user would insert a chemical igniter, which would act as the weapon's fuse. When a vehicle drove over the grenade, its weight crushed the plate, which in turn cracked the igniter; this then leaked acid onto a sensitive chemical which detonated the charge. The grenade was designed so that it could either be thrown at a vehicle like an ordinary anti-tank grenade, or placed at a location when used as an anti-tank mine. It was also fitted with areas where blasting caps or cordtex could be placed, so that it could be used as a demolition charge. When the grenade was used, it was recommended that the user be within a short distance of their target, ideally concealed within a trench; if the target were an armoured vehicle, then the best areas to target were the sides and rear, where the engine compartment was located and armour was generally thinner.

== Operational history ==
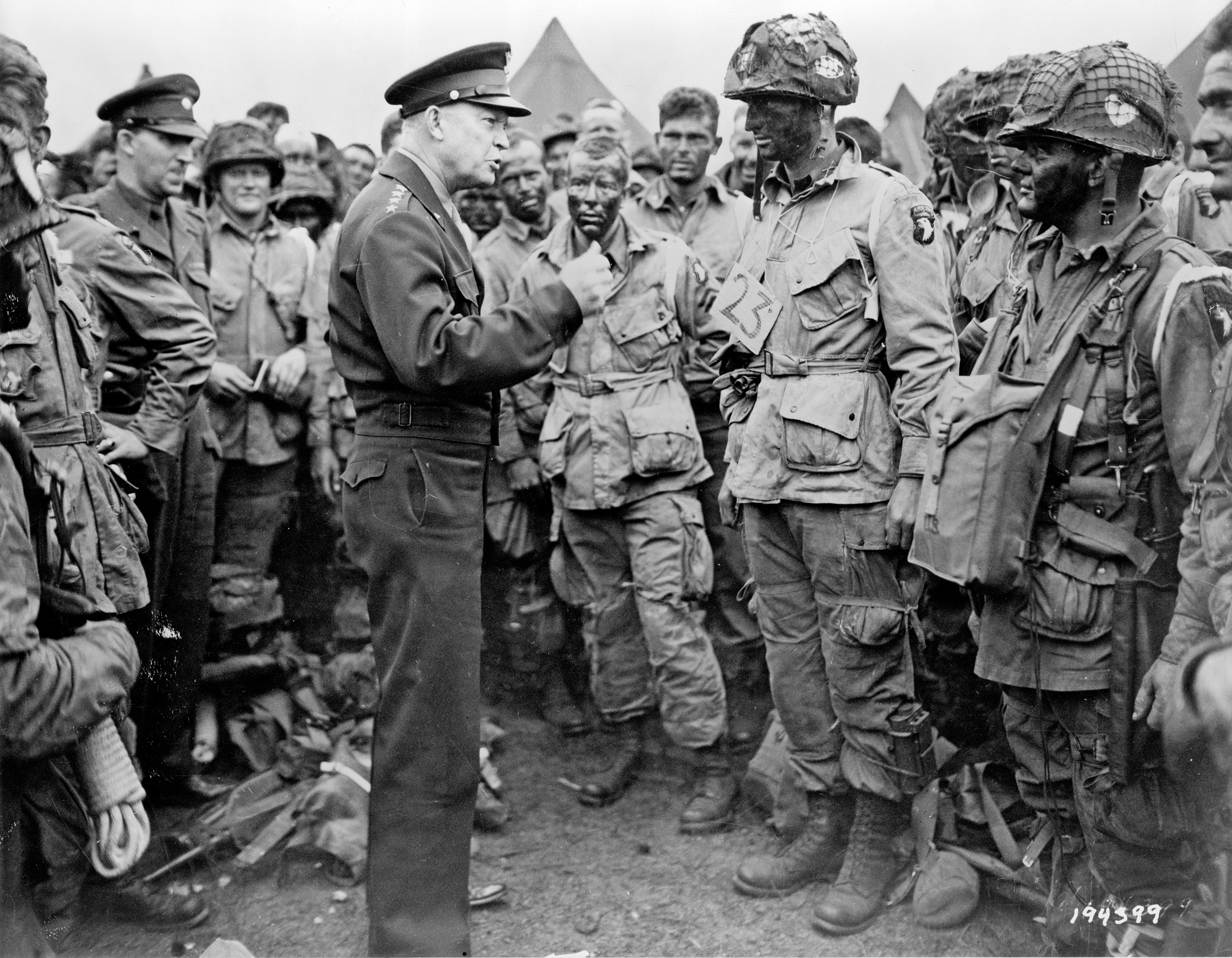
1st Lieutenant Wallace Strobel, speaking with SHAEF commander General Dwight D. Eisenhower, has a Hawkins grenade strapped to his leg

Introduced in 1942, the grenade saw service with the British Army until 1955. The United States Army also used the grenade, as well as developing their own variant, the M7 light anti-tank mine. When used in an anti-tank role, a number of the grenades could be strung together in a "daisy chain" at intervals of around two feet before being placed across a road. It was particularly effective at damaging the tracks of tanks. When sufficient grenades were grouped together, they were capable of disabling a medium tank. The Hawkins was also used in other roles, such as breaching walls, and its small size enabled its placement into the "web" of a railway line to destroy a section of track. The weapon received the nickname "Johnson's Wax tin" due to its appearance to a commercially produced floor treatment product.

In the Battle of Ortona Canadian troops used them as demolition charges to "mousehole" between buildings. On August 19 during the Battle of Normandy, B company of 2nd Battalion of the Monmouthshire Regiment used Hawkins grenades to directly disable one Tiger I tank, and immobilize a second one (Tiger 114) that collided with the first and was subsequently employed by Free French forces.

== Users ==
Users of the grenade included:

- United Kingdom
- Canada
- United States

== See also ==
- British anti-invasion preparations of World War II

== Bibliography ==
- British Explosive Ordnance (PDF) (Report). Ordnance Pamphlet. Department of the Navy, Ordnance Systems Command. 10 June 1946. OCLC 51810278. NAVORD OP 1665. Archived from the original (PDF) on 4 March 2016.
- Bishop, Chris (2002). The Encyclopedia of Weapons of World War II: The Comprehensive Guide to Over 1,500 Weapons Systems, Including Tanks, Small Arms, Warplanes, Artillery, Ships and Submarines. Sterling Publishing Company, Inc. ISBN 1-58663-762-2.
- Bull, Stephen (2005). World War II Infantry Tactics: Company and Battalion. Elite No. 122. illustrated by Peter Dennis. Osprey Publishing. ISBN 1-84176-663-1.
- Bull, Stephen (2004). World War II Infantry Tactics: Squad and Platoon. Elite No. 51. illustrated by Mike Chappell and Brian Delf. Osprey Publishing. ISBN 1-84176-662-3.
- Hogg, Ian (1995). Tank Killers: Anti-Tank Warfare by Men and Machines. Pan Macmillan. ISBN 0-330-35316-0.
- Lampe, David (1968). The Last Ditch: Britain's Secret Resistance and the Nazi Invasion Plan. Greenhill Books. ISBN 978-1-85367-730-4.
- Lowry, Bernard (2004). British Home Defences 1940-45. Fortress No. 20. illustrated by Chris Taylor and Vincent Boulanger. Osprey Publishing. ISBN 1-84176-767-0.
- Mackenzie, S.P. (1995). The Home Guard: A Military and Political History. Oxford University Press. ISBN 0-19-820577-5.
- Rottman, Gordon L. (2005). World War II Infantry Anti-Tank Tactics. Elite No. 124. illustrated by Steven Noon. Osprey Publishing. ISBN 1-84176-842-1.
- Rottman, Gordon L. (2008). World War II Infantry Assault Tactics. illustrated by Peter Dennis. Osprey Publishing. ISBN 978-1-84603-191-5.
