= Trimethoxyamphetamine =

Trimethoxyamphetamine (TMA) may refer to the following:

- 3,4,5-Trimethoxyamphetamine (3,4,5-TMA; TMA-1; TMA; α-methylmescaline; mescalamphetamine; 3C-M)
- 2,4,5-Trimethoxyamphetamine (2,4,5-TMA; TMA-2; DOMeO)
- 2,3,4-Trimethoxyamphetamine (2,3,4-TMA; TMA-3; α-methylisomescaline)
- 2,3,5-Trimethoxyamphetamine (2,3,5-TMA; TMA-4)
- 2,3,6-Trimethoxyamphetamine (2,3,6-TMA; TMA-5)
- 2,4,6-Trimethoxyamphetamine (2,4,6-TMA; TMA-6; ψ-TMA-2)

== See also ==
- Substituted methoxyphenethylamine
- Methoxyamphetamine
- Dimethoxyamphetamine
- Tetramethoxyamphetamine
- Methoxyphenethylamine
- Dimethoxyphenethylamine
- Trimethoxyphenethylamine
- Tetramethoxyphenethylamine
- Pentamethoxyphenethylamine
