= List of former equipment of the Lebanese Armed Forces =

This article contains all out of services arms and equipment used by the Lebanese Armed Forces since its early foundation. The items are arranged in categories according to the branch they are used in.

== Ground Force ==
Category	Types
Infantry weapons	Walther P38, Lebel rifle, Berthier rifle, FM 24/29, MAS-36, Beretta Model 38, M2 carbine, MAS-49, MAS-49/56, MAT-49, FR F1, FN FAL
Main battle tank	R.35 (37 mm and 40 mm gun), H.35, Charioteer, Sherman Firefly, M41 Walker Bulldog, AMX-13 (75 mm and 105 mm gun), M48A1 (90 mm gun)
Armored personnel carriers	M59, Panhard M3, Chaimite, AMX-VCI, AMX-13 VTT, FV-603 Saracen, M125A2 (with 81 mm mortar), Universal Carrier, Cadillac Gage V-100 Commando
Infantry fighting vehicles	AMX-13, Saladin, Ferret, Staghound
Towed artillery	Brandt 120 mm mortar
Anti-aircraft weaponry	M55 20 mm, M-42 "Duster", ZSU-23-4 Shilka, M35 2-1/2 ton cargo truck with ZU-23-2
Anti-tank missiles	ENTAC, SS.11
Anti-tank unguided missiles	88.9mm Instalaza M65 (Bazooka variant),
Vehicles	M3 Scout Car, Kraz trucks, Saviem Trucks, MAZ-537G, ACMAT, Dodge trucks, M-38 jeep, Pinzgauer, M-34 trucks, Gurgel Xavante, Jeep Wagoneer
Logistics and engineering equipment	Willème tank transporter, M5 tractor, M817 dump truck

== Air Force ==
Aircraft	Total	Notes
Hawker Hunter	19	10 were sold to Jordan, 1 was shot down in the Six-Day War by the IDF, 4 are inactive and displayed in the Lebanese Air Force Museum, while the remaining 4 were retired in 2014. 5 to be sold.
de Havilland Vampire	16	Ordered by 1952, started arriving in 1953. The single seat Vampires served through the 60s, while at least 2 twin-seater trainer Vampires remained active to the early 1970s. A T.55 is on display at the Lebanese Air Force Museum.
de Havilland Dove	1	Received a DH.104 in 1951, served for over 40 years. Was used for transport as well as general purpose and reconnaissance missions
de Havilland Chipmunk	6	6 DH Chipmunk T.20s and T.30s were ordered and received between 1950 and the early 60s. retired in 1974
Fouga Magister CM-170	10	Delivered in 1966, 5 more were bought from the German Air Force Further (Luftwaffe) in 1972. On display at the Lebanese Air Force Museum at Rayak Air Base.
Dassault Mirage III E/D	12	Sold to Pakistan in 2000.
Savoia Marchetti SM.79	4	In 1949 Italy donated 4 SM.79, they were retired in the early 60s. The aircraft were stored in excellent storage conditions. They were redonated to Italy to the Italian Museo dell’Aeronautica Gianni Caproni and elsewhere
Scottish Aviation Bulldog	6	6 Scottish Aviation Bulldogs received in 1975, Currently 3 Bulldogs remain, 1 shot down during a sortie over hostile territories, and 2 lost in accidents. The remaining 3 were retired in 2014.
North American T-6 Texan	16	Ordered and received in 1952, and final batch of T-6 Harvards was received in 1957, The Harvards were retired in 1972.
Percival Prentice	3	In 1949 Britain donated 3 Percival Proctors they were received In May 1949.
Percival Proctor	3	In 1949 Britain donated 3 Percival Proctors they were received In May 1949.
Macchi M.B.308	1	
Rockwell Shrike Turbo Commander 690	1	Destroyed in 1982
Dassault Falcon 20	1	
Aérospatiale Alouette II	4	Between 1959 and 1960 4 SA-319 Alouette II received, retired in early 1980s. On display at the Lebanese Air Force Museum.
Aérospatiale Alouette III	14	On display at the Lebanese Air Force Museum.
Aérospatiale Gazelle	17	8 were bought in the 1980s and 9 were donated by the UAE in 2004.
Aérospatiale SA 330 Puma	15	5 were bought during the Lebanese Civil War and 10 were donated by the UAE.
Robinson R44	6	4 are operational for training school.
Bell UH-1N Twin Huey	12	First batch of 6 AB 212s arrived between 1973 and 1974, last batch received in 1979. 5 will be restored into active service.
Bell UH-1 Iroquois	24	Three crashed while 21 remain active and will be replaced with 24 Huey II.
Sikorsky S-61	3	Retired in 2020 and to be sold in an open market.

== Navy ==
Type	Class/country of origin	Commissioned	Decommissioned	Details
Large patrol craft boats	France	1959	1991	31 – Tripoli
Coastal patrol craft	Byblos class / France	1955	1991	11 – Byblos
Coastal patrol craft	Byblos class / France	1955	1991	12 – Sidon
Coastal patrol craft	Byblos class / France	1955	1991	13 – Beirut

== See also ==
- List of equipment of the Lebanese Armed Forces
- Weapons of the Lebanese Civil War
