= PT-56 mine =

Type of landmine

The PT-56 is a rectangular plastic cased Yugoslavian minimum metal anti-tank blast mine. It is very similar in appearance and size to the TMA-2, which has superseded it.

== Specifications ==
- Length: 260 mm
- Width: 330 mm
- Weight: 7 kg
- Explosive content: 5.4 kg of TNT
- Operating pressure: 100 kg
