= 2,3,5-Trimethoxyphenethylamine =

Clinical data
- Other names: 2,3,5-TMPEA; TMPEA-4; 2C-TMA-4
- ATC code: None

Identifiers
- IUPAC name: 2-(2,3,5-trimethoxyphenyl)ethanamine
- CAS Number: 3166-77-6
- PubChem CID: 413872
- ChemSpider: 366438
- ChEMBL: ChEMBL1741591

Chemical and physical data
- Formula: C_{11}H_{17}NO_{3}
- Molar mass: 211.261 g·mol^{−1}
- 3D model (JSmol): Interactive image
- SMILES: COC1=CC(=C(C(=C1)OC)OC)CCN
- InChI: InChI=1S/C11H17NO3/c1-13-9-6-8(4-5-12)11(15-3)10(7-9)14-2/h6-7H,4-5,12H2,1-3H3; Key:GERNGXILVRWWGB-UHFFFAOYSA-N

2,3,5-Trimethoxyphenethylamine (2,3,5-TMPEA), also known as TMPEA-4 or as 2C-TMA-4, is a chemical compound of the phenethylamine family related to mescaline (3,4,5-trimethoxyphenethylamine). It is one of the possible positional isomers of trimethoxyphenethylamine and is a positional isomer of mescaline. According to Alexander Shulgin in his book PiHKAL (Phenethylamines I Have Known and Loved), 2,3,5-TMPEA has never been tested in humans. Unlike mescaline, 2,3,5-TMPEA does not appear to be a substrate for amine oxidase. The chemical synthesis of 2,3,5-TMPEA has been described. The 2,3,5- substitution pattern, as in 2,3,5-TMPEA, is said to be the most difficult tri-substitution pattern in terms of synthesis. 2,3,5-TMPEA was first described in the scientific literature by J. R. Merchant and A. J. Mountwala in 1958. As a positional isomer of mescaline, it is a Schedule I controlled substance in the United States. The drug is also a controlled substance in Canada under phenethylamine blanket-ban language.

== See also ==
- Trimethoxyphenethylamine
- Substituted methoxyphenethylamine
- 2,3,5-Trimethoxyamphetamine (2,3,5-TMA; TMA-4)
- 2C-O (2,4,5-TMPEA)
- Isomescaline (2,3,4-TMPEA)
- ψ-2C-O (2,4,6-TMPEA)
