= Trimethoxyphenethylamine =

Trimethoxyphenethylamine (TMPEA) may refer to the following:

- 3,4,5-Trimethoxyphenethylamine (3,4,5-TMPEA; TMPEA-1; TMPEA; mescaline)
- 2,4,5-Trimethoxyphenethylamine (2,4,5-TMPEA; TMPEA-2; 2C-O)
- 2,3,4-Trimethoxyphenethylamine (2,3,4-TMPEA; TMPEA-3; isomescaline)
- 2,3,5-Trimethoxyphenethylamine (2,3,5-TMPEA; TMPEA-4; 2C-TMA-4)
- 2,3,6-Trimethoxyphenethylamine (2,3,6-TMPEA; TMPEA-5; 2C-TMA-5)
- 2,4,6-Trimethoxyphenethylamine (2,4,6-TMPEA; TMPEA-6; ψ-2C-O)

== See also ==
- Substituted methoxyphenethylamine
- Methoxyphenethylamine
- Dimethoxyphenethylamine
- Tetramethoxyphenethylamine
- Pentamethoxyphenethylamine
- Methoxyamphetamine
- Dimethoxyamphetamine
- Trimethoxyamphetamine
- Tetramethoxyamphetamine
- Pentamethoxyamphetamine
