= M816 Wrecker =

Truck, Medium wrecker, 5 Ton, 6×6, M816
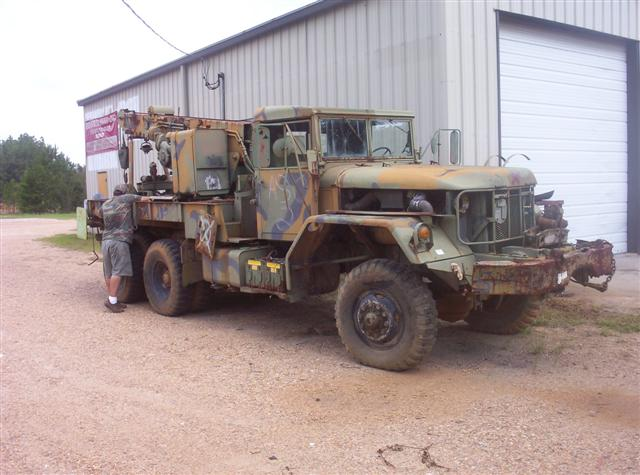
- M816 Medium wrecker
- Type: Heavy Truck
- Place of origin: United States

Production history
- Manufacturer: AM General
- Produced: 1970-1980s

Specifications
- Mass: 35,050 lb (15,900 kg)
- Length: 356 in (9.04 m)
- Width: 98 in (2.49 m)
- Height: 112 in (2.84 m)
- Engine: Cummins NHC-250; 855 cu in (14.0 L) diesel I6; 240 hp (180 kW) @2100 rpm 685 lbf⋅ft (929 N⋅m) @1500 rpm
- Operational range: 585 mi (941 km)
- Maximum speed: 52 mph (84 km/h)

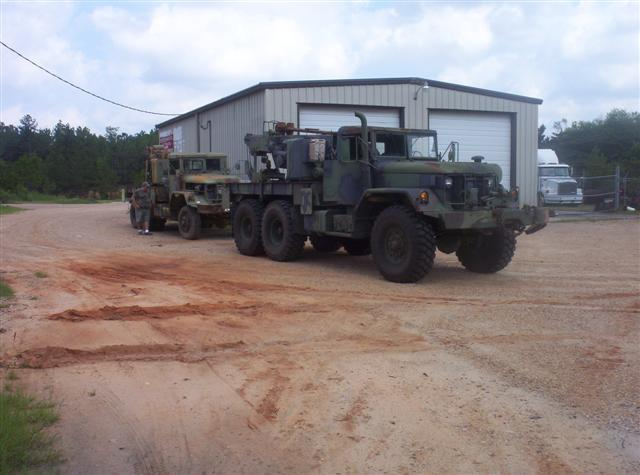
An M816 wrecker being pulled by another M816

The M816 Medium Wrecker is part of the M809 series of 5-ton 6x6 military trucks. It was made by AM General starting in 1970. It has a revolving hydraulic crane with an extending boom that can extend from 10 to 18 ft with a maximum lift capacity of 20,000 lb with outriggers and boom jacks to the ground. The boom capacity depends on boom extension and placements of truck outriggers and boom jacks. With boom full out and no outriggers, the capacity is only 3000 lb. The boom elevates to 45 degrees, swings 270.

Boom Capacity Chart
| Radius | With outriggers | Without outriggers |
|---|---|---|
| 18 ft | 4000 lb | 3000 lb |
| 17 ft | 4250 lb | 3200 lb |
| 16 ft | 4550 lb | 3500 lb |
| 15 ft | 5000 lb | 3800 lb |
| 14 ft | 5600 lb | 4100 lb |
| 13 ft | 6300 lb | 4600 lb |
| 12 ft | 7100 lb | 5100 lb |
| 11 ft | 8400 lb | 5800 lb |
| 10 ft | 10000 lb | 6700 lb |

The fuel consumption rate is 5 mpg. The towing capacity is 14 tons on road or 10 tons cross country (or off-road). The front winch has a 20Klb capacity and the rear winch is 45klb capacity.

These trucks were specially built for the United States Army to pull medium duty equipment through non-incorporated terrain.
