= Maritime Telemedical Assistance Service =

Maritime Telemedical Assistance Services (TMAS), sometimes referred to as Medico services, because of its radio code, is a medical advice service for seafarers that can provide distant assistance and support through marine radio, e-mail, telephone or fax. In coordination with the local Maritime Rescue Coordination Center (MRCC), TMAS organizations also arrange for medevac to shore, emergency treatment at land facilities and the dispatch of medical personnel to ships with ill mariners.

The rationale for TMAS services is that medical emergencies can occur while many days away from harbor and at prohibitively large distances from Search and Rescue bases, making immediate evacuation impractical or impossible.

The ship's master is responsible for medical treatment at sea, and all commercial ships are required to possess minimal medical supplies. TMAS specialists diagnose cases using non-expert symptom descriptions and advise untrained personnel about emergency treatment given the available supplies and facilities.

All seafaring nations are required by International Labour Organization/International Maritime Organization convention 163 of 1986 to set up a TMAS center that operates 24 hours a day. The center must be staffed by physicians trained in remote consultation and in the peculiarities of shipboard treatment to all civilian ships within their Search and Rescue Region (SRR).

The duties of the TMAS as established by the IAMSAR manual are:

1.2.3 Telemedical Assistance Service (TMAS)

1.2.3.1 The TMAS is responsible for the following functions:

a. Be available 24 hours per day, 7 days a week to receive requests from vessels at sea and/or the RCC for the provision of medical advice;

b. Making prompt medical assessments of remote patients and providing prompt advice to ships’ Masters in relation to medical treatment to be administered to those patients, generally by non-medical personnel;

c. Providing prompt medical specialist advice when required;

d. Where it is essential for the safety of the patient, taking into account all circumstances, making recommendations to ship Masters and to the RCC for evacuation of patients to shore-based facilities or to another vessel;

e. Advising the RCC of any special medical requirements or constraints that may affect the type and equipment fit of the proposed recovery platform for evacuation of patients to shore-based facilities or to another vessel;

f. Providing briefing to the paramedic or doctor who may accompany the MEDEVAC vehicle, to provide continuity of medical attention and also consult on evacuation procedures and constraints;

g. When a patient is to be evacuated to a shore-based medical facility or the Master of a ship has decided to divert to a port, consulting with the RCC and the evacuating craft and recommending a medical facility to which the patient should be evacuated. Make appropriate arrangements with the medical facility to receive the patient;

h. Ensuring, through liaison as required, that the receiving hospital is briefed about the patient’s condition and treatment;

i. As necessary for the purpose of communicating with a ship’s Master or crew, arranging access to interpreter services where possible. –Note that this interpreter service may be arranged by the RCC;

j. Providing medical advice to the RCC with respect to the prospects for survival/injury of persons subject to search and rescue in both land and sea environments; and

k. Providing statistical information, to the RCC, on an annual basis in relation to the services performed.

— International Aeronautical and Maritime Search and Rescue (IAMSAR) Manual

TMAS are established independently by each country, sometimes as independent organisations (such as those of Spain and Italy), sometimes as adjunct units of a major hospital with suitable emergency, trauma and quarantine facilities.
