= M7 mine =

United States anti-tank mine

The M7 is a small, metal-cased United States anti-tank blast mine that was used during the Second World War. It was based on the British Hawkins grenade. Approximately 2.5 million were produced before production ceased, and although it has long since been withdrawn from U.S. service, it can be found in Angola, Burma, Cambodia, Chad, Eritrea, Ethiopia, Korea, Lebanon, Myanmar, Somalia, Thailand, and Zambia.

== Description ==
The mine has a thin olive green painted steel case, with a large hinged pressure plate. This plate transfers force onto the mine's fuze. The fuze is triggered by relatively low pressures, making the mine effective against trucks and cars. Additionally, the fuze may be sensitive enough to make it effective as an anti-personnel mine. The mine was normally deployed inside a cloth bag or sack to prevent rocks getting trapped under the hinged lid of the mine. The mine only has a small main charge, so was typically deployed in lines or rows of up to five mines to be effective against tanks.

Several variants of the mine were produced, and two chemical (the M600 and M601) and one mechanical fuzes (the M603) were developed for the mine. A secondary fuze well may be fitted to the mine for anti-handling devices. The most common type of booby trap detonator is the M1 pull which is installed in the end fuse well. This can be attached to a trip wire or a small stake underground for anti-removal detonation. Command detonations can be achieved by screwing in an electric cap adapter and firing it with a demolition firing machine. It can even be detonated by installing a standard firing coupler with a fuse cap and safety fuse.

== Specifications ==
- Weight: 2.2 kg
- Explosive content: 1.62 kg of Tetryl
- Length: 178 mm
- Width: 114 mm
- Height: 64 mm
- Operating pressure: 60 to 110 kg

== Variants ==
- M7 - fitted with M600 chemical fuze
- M7A1 - fitted with M601 chemical fuze
- M7A2 - fitted with M602 mechanical fuze
