= Volvo EC =

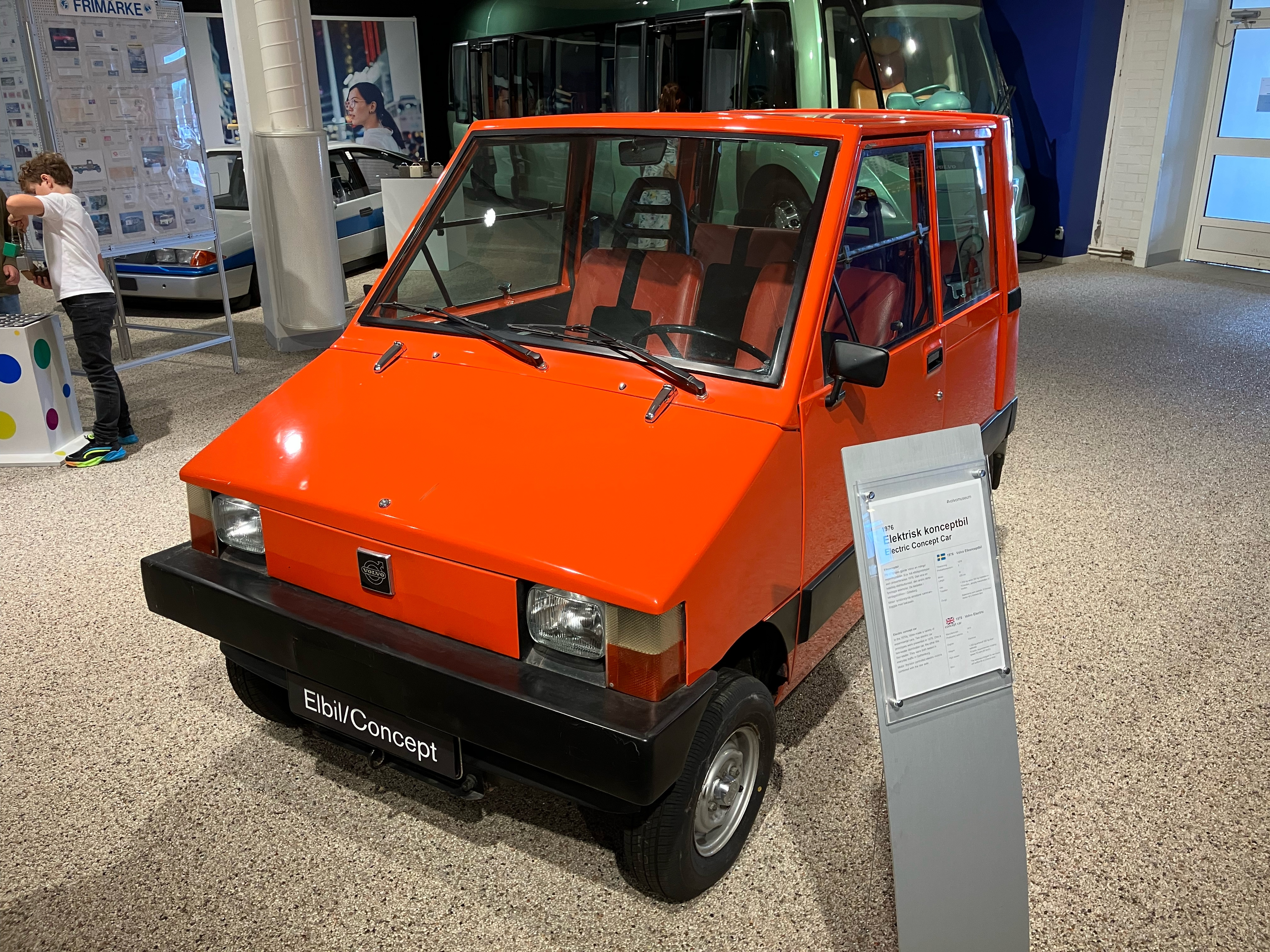
1976 Volvo ElbilConcept car

Volvo EC (“Volvo Electric Car”) was a concept car, which was built by Volvo in 1976.

The car was developed in the backdrop of the 1972 United Nations Conference on the Human Environment and 1973 oil crisis. At the conference Volvo chair Pehr G. Gyllenhammar had stated: "As a car manufacturer we are part of the problem, and therefore we must be part of the solution". The project was in part sponsored by Televerket, which wanted to be able to cover short distances without producing emissions. Televerket intended to use the car for its staff in Gothenburg. Two versions were built, a red 4-seater and a yellow 2-seater, with the former intended as a commuter vehicle and the latter as a delivery vehicle. Both cars were similar, but the yellow car had a sliding door.

The yellow Volvo EC was only 2.46 metres (96.9 in) in length. The car weighed around 2000 pounds. Power was supplied by 12 six volt batteries. The car needed ten hours of charging, for two hours (50 miles) of driving. The battery pack could be removed via the front bumper. The car had 13 horsepower. It had a top speed of 70 km/h (43 mph).

The Volvo EC never entered production. The red car is located at the World of Volvo. The location of the yellow vehicle is unknown.
