= TMA-2 mine =

Anti-tank mine

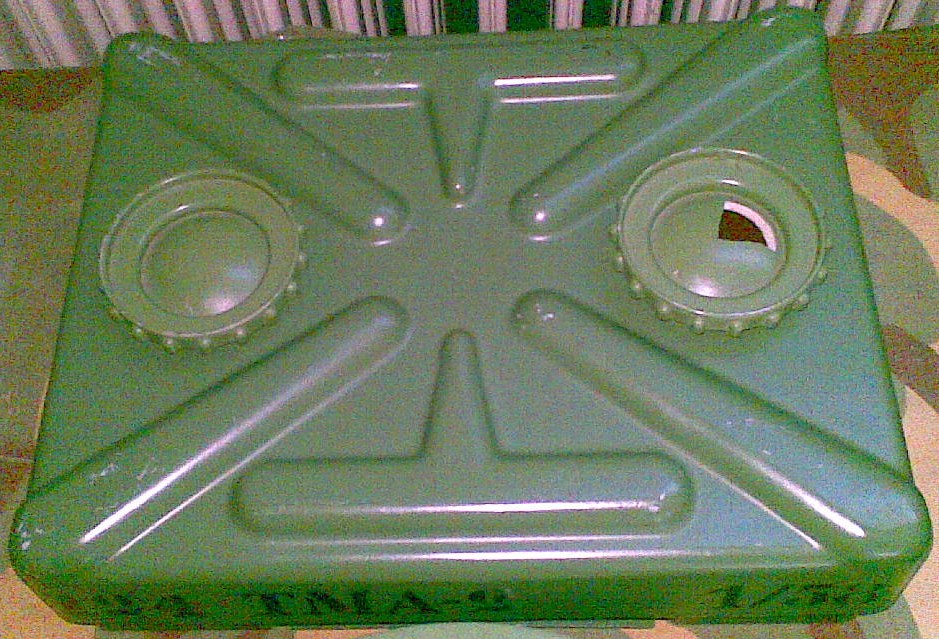
A TMA-2

The TMA-2 is a rectangular plastic cased Yugoslavian minimum metal anti-tank blast mine. It is very similar in appearance and size to the PT-56, which it replaced. The mine consists of two sections, an upper ribbed pressure plate with two large circular fuze caps, and a lower base section containing the main charge and two primary fuze wells containing UANU-1 fuzes. A secondary fuze well is provided in the base of the mine for an anti-handling device.

Sufficient pressure causes the top pressure plate of the mine to collapse downwards, forcing one or both of the fuze's plungers into a friction sensitive explosive, triggering the main charge.

It is found in Angola, Bosnia, Croatia, Kosovo, and Namibia.

== Specifications ==
- Length: 260 mm
- Width: 200 mm
- Height: 140 mm
- Weight: 7.5 kg
- Explosive content: 6.5 kg of TNT
- Operating pressure: 100 kg
