= 2,3,5-Trimethoxyamphetamine =

TMA-4

Clinical data
- Other names: 2,3,5-TMA; TMA-4
- Routes of administration: Oral
- Drug class: Serotonin receptor modulator; Serotonergic psychedelic; Hallucinogen
- ATC code: None

Pharmacokinetic data
- Duration of action: ~6 hours

Identifiers
- IUPAC name: 1-(2,3,5-trimethoxyphenyl)propan-2-amine
- CAS Number: 23693-14-3
- PubChem CID: 602804
- ChemSpider: 523988
- UNII: LEL94CV318
- ChEMBL: ChEMBL103331
- CompTox Dashboard (EPA): DTXSID201342467

Chemical and physical data
- Formula: C_{12}H_{19}NO_{3}
- Molar mass: 225.288 g·mol^{−1}
- 3D model (JSmol): Interactive image
- SMILES: CC(CC1=C(C(=CC(=C1)OC)OC)OC)N
- InChI: InChI=1S/C12H19NO3/c1-8(13)5-9-6-10(14-2)7-11(15-3)12(9)16-4/h6-8H,5,13H2,1-4H3; Key:MJIBJXKJBRLSQA-UHFFFAOYSA-N

2,3,5-Trimethoxyamphetamine (2,3,5-TMA), also known as TMA-4, is a psychedelic drug of the phenethylamine and amphetamine families. It is one of the possible positional isomers of trimethoxyamphetamine and is a positional isomer of 3,4,5-trimethoxyamphetamine (TMA or TMA-1).

== Use and effects ==
In his book PiHKAL (Phenethylamines I Have Known and Loved) and other publications, Alexander Shulgin lists 2,3,5-TMA's dose as greater than 80 mg orally and its duration as perhaps or about 6 hours. Based on limited testing, it produced threshold effects including much introspection among others, along with no subjective physical symptoms. The drug at 80 mg was described as comparable to 50 μg LSD or 120 mg TMA and as being roughly 4-fold as potent as mescaline. Per Shulgin, more testing is needed to fully characterize the drug in humans.

== Pharmacology ==
=== Pharmacodynamics ===
2,3,5-TMA shows affinity for serotonin receptors. The drug substitutes for DOM in rodent drug discrimination tests.

== Chemistry ==
=== Synthesis ===
The chemical synthesis of 2,3,5-TMA has been described.

== History ==
2,3,5-TMA was first described in the scientific literature by Alexander Shulgin in 1966. Subsequently, it was described in greater detail by Shulgin in his 1991 book PiHKAL (Phenethylamines I Have Known and Loved).

== Society and culture ==
=== Legal status ===
==== Canada ====
2,3,5-TMA is a controlled substance in Canada under phenethylamine blanket-ban language.

==== United States ====
As a positional isomer of 3,4,5-trimethoxyamphetamine (TMA), 2,3,5-TMA is a Schedule I controlled substance in the United States.

== See also ==
- Trimethoxyamphetamine
- Substituted methoxyphenethylamine
- 2,3,5-Trimethoxyphenethylamine (2,3,5-TMPEA; TMPEA-4)
