= Isomescaline =

Clinical data
- Other names: 2,3,4-Trimethoxyphenethylamine; 2,3,4-TMPEA; TMPEA-3; 2C-TMA-3; Reciprocal mescaline
- Routes of administration: Oral
- ATC code: None

Pharmacokinetic data
- Duration of action: Unknown

Identifiers
- IUPAC name: 2-(2,3,4-trimethoxyphenyl)ethan-1-amine
- CAS Number: 3937-16-4
- PubChem CID: 414332
- ChemSpider: 366878
- UNII: Y5A6OUU263
- ChEMBL: ChEMBL280797
- CompTox Dashboard (EPA): DTXSID60192571

Chemical and physical data
- Formula: C_{11}H_{17}NO_{3}
- Molar mass: 211.261 g·mol^{−1}
- 3D model (JSmol): Interactive image
- SMILES: O(c1ccc(c(OC)c1OC)CCN)C
- InChI: InChI=1S/C11H17NO3/c1-13-9-5-4-8(6-7-12)10(14-2)11(9)15-3/h4-5H,6-7,12H2,1-3H3; Key:PVLFQRLVSMMSQK-UHFFFAOYSA-N

Isomescaline (IM), also known as 2,3,4-trimethoxyphenethylamine (2,3,4-TMPEA) or as TMPEA-3 or 2C-TMA-3, is a chemical compound of the phenethylamine and scaline families related to the psychedelic drug mescaline (3,4,5-trimethoxyphenethylamine; 2,3,4-TMPEA). It is one of several possible positional isomers of trimethoxyphenethylamine (TMPEA). In addition, it is the positional isomer of mescaline in which the methoxy groups on the phenyl ring are located at the 2, 3, and 4 positions instead of at the 3, 4, and 5 positions.

In his book PiHKAL (Phenethylamines I Have Known and Loved) and other publications, Alexander Shulgin lists isomescaline's dose as greater than 400 mg orally and its duration as unknown. The compound produced no effects at tested doses of up to 400 mg orally in humans. It was concluded that isomescaline is inactive.

The chemical synthesis of isomescaline has been described. Analogues of isomescaline include 2,3,4-trimethoxyamphetamine (2,3,4-TMA; TMA-3; α-methylisomescaline) and the thioisomescaline (TIM) compounds, among others.

Isomescaline was first described in the scientific literature by L. Clark and colleagues by 1965. Subsequently, it was described in greater detail by Shulgin in PiHKAL in 1991. Isomescaline is not a controlled substance in Canada as of 2025.

== See also ==
- Trimethoxyphenethylamine
- Substituted methoxyphenethylamine
- Scaline
- Trimetazidine
