= 2,3,6-Trimethoxyamphetamine =

TMA-5

Clinical data
- Other names: 2,3,6-TMA; TMA-5
- Routes of administration: Oral
- Drug class: Serotonergic psychedelic; Hallucinogen; Stimulant
- ATC code: None

Pharmacokinetic data
- Duration of action: 8–10 hours

Identifiers
- IUPAC name: 1-(2,3,6-trimethoxyphenyl)propan-2-amine
- CAS Number: 20513-16-0
- PubChem CID: 31013
- ChemSpider: 28772
- UNII: E0NJ557A3E
- ChEMBL: ChEMBL125134
- CompTox Dashboard (EPA): DTXSID90274910

Chemical and physical data
- Formula: C_{12}H_{19}NO_{3}
- Molar mass: 225.288 g·mol^{−1}
- 3D model (JSmol): Interactive image
- SMILES: CC(CC1=C(C=CC(=C1OC)OC)OC)N
- InChI: InChI=1S/C12H19NO3/c1-8(13)7-9-10(14-2)5-6-11(15-3)12(9)16-4/h5-6,8H,7,13H2,1-4H3; Key:OASZJWLOOFXASO-UHFFFAOYSA-N

2,3,6-Trimethoxyamphetamine (2,3,6-TMA), also known as TMA-5, is a psychedelic drug and mild stimulant of the phenethylamine and amphetamine families. It is one of the possible positional isomers of trimethoxyamphetamine and is a positional isomer of 3,4,5-trimethoxyamphetamine (TMA or TMA-1).

== Use and effects ==
In his book PiHKAL (Phenethylamines I Have Known and Loved) and other publications, Alexander Shulgin lists 2,3,6-TMA's dose as approximately 30 mg or more orally and its duration as 8 to 10 hours. Based on limited testing, the effects of 2,3,6-TMA were reported to include intense introspection, mild stimulation, and pupil dilation, among others. The drug was said to be comparable to about 75 μg or more LSD. It is approximately 10 times more potent than mescaline. However, it was noted that more testing was needed.

== Pharmacology ==
=== Pharmacodynamics ===
Unlike the other TMA isomers, 2,3,6-TMA was not tested at serotonin receptors or in rodent drug discrimination tests.

== Chemistry ==
=== Synthesis ===
The chemical synthesis of 2,3,6-TMA has been described.

== History ==
2,3,6-TMA was first described in the scientific literature by Alexander Shulgin in 1966. Subsequently, it was described in greater detail by Shulgin in his 1991 book PiHKAL (Phenethylamines I Have Known and Loved).

== Society and culture ==
=== Legal status ===
==== Canada ====
2,3,6-TMA is a controlled substance in Canada under phenethylamine blanket-ban language.

==== United States ====
As a positional isomer of 3,4,5-trimethoxyamphetamine (TMA), 2,3,6-TMA is a Schedule I controlled substance in the United States.

== See also ==
- Trimethoxyamphetamine
- Substituted methoxyphenethylamine
- 2,3,6-Trimethoxyphenethylamine (2,3,6-TMPEA; TMPEA-5; 2C-TMA-5)
