= 2,3,4-Trimethoxyamphetamine =

TMA-3

Clinical data
- Other names: 2,3,4-TMA; TMA-3; α-Methylisomescaline
- Routes of administration: Oral
- Drug class: Serotonin receptor modulator; Serotonergic psychedelic; Hallucinogen
- ATC code: None

Pharmacokinetic data
- Duration of action: Unknown

Identifiers
- IUPAC name: 1-(2,3,4-trimethoxyphenyl)propan-2-amine
- CAS Number: 1082-23-1
- PubChem CID: 31012
- ChemSpider: 28771
- UNII: 9T3SO4A6HM
- ChEMBL: ChEMBL30777
- CompTox Dashboard (EPA): DTXSID60874365

Chemical and physical data
- Formula: C_{12}H_{19}NO_{3}
- Molar mass: 225.288 g·mol^{−1}
- 3D model (JSmol): Interactive image
- SMILES: CC(CC1=C(C(=C(C=C1)OC)OC)OC)N
- InChI: InChI=1S/C12H19NO3/c1-8(13)7-9-5-6-10(14-2)12(16-4)11(9)15-3/h5-6,8H,7,13H2,1-4H3; Key:LWDQPPLPHGXYLG-UHFFFAOYSA-N

2,3,4-Trimethoxyamphetamine (2,3,4-TMA), also known as TMA-3 or as α-methylisomescaline, is a putative psychedelic drug of the phenethylamine and amphetamine families. It is one of the possible positional isomers of trimethoxyamphetamine and is a positional isomer of 3,4,5-trimethoxyamphetamine (TMA or TMA-1).

== Use and effects ==
In his book PiHKAL (Phenethylamines I Have Known and Loved) and other publications, Alexander Shulgin lists 2,3,4-TMA's dose as greater than 100 mg orally and its duration as unknown. The drug produced no effects whatsoever at a dose of 100 mg in three separate individuals. Higher doses were not tested, but 2,3,4-TMA could possibly be active at higher doses.

== Pharmacology ==
=== Pharmacodynamics ===
2,3,4-TMA shows affinity for serotonin receptors. It substituted for DOM in rodent drug discrimination tests.

== Chemistry ==
=== Synthesis ===
The chemical synthesis of 2,3,4-TMA has been described.

== History ==
2,3,4-TMA was first described in the scientific literature by Alexander Shulgin in 1964. Subsequently, it was described in greater detail by Shulgin in his 1991 book PiHKAL (Phenethylamines I Have Known and Loved).

== Society and culture ==
=== Legal status ===
==== Canada ====
2,3,4-TMA is a controlled substance in Canada under phenethylamine blanket-ban language.

==== United States ====
As a positional isomer of 3,4,5-trimethoxyamphetamine (TMA), 2,3,4-TMA is a Schedule I controlled substance in the United States.

== See also ==
- Trimethoxyamphetamine
- Substituted methoxyphenethylamine
- Isomescaline (2,3,4-TMPEA; TMPEA-4)
