= TMA-3 mine =

Anti-tank mine

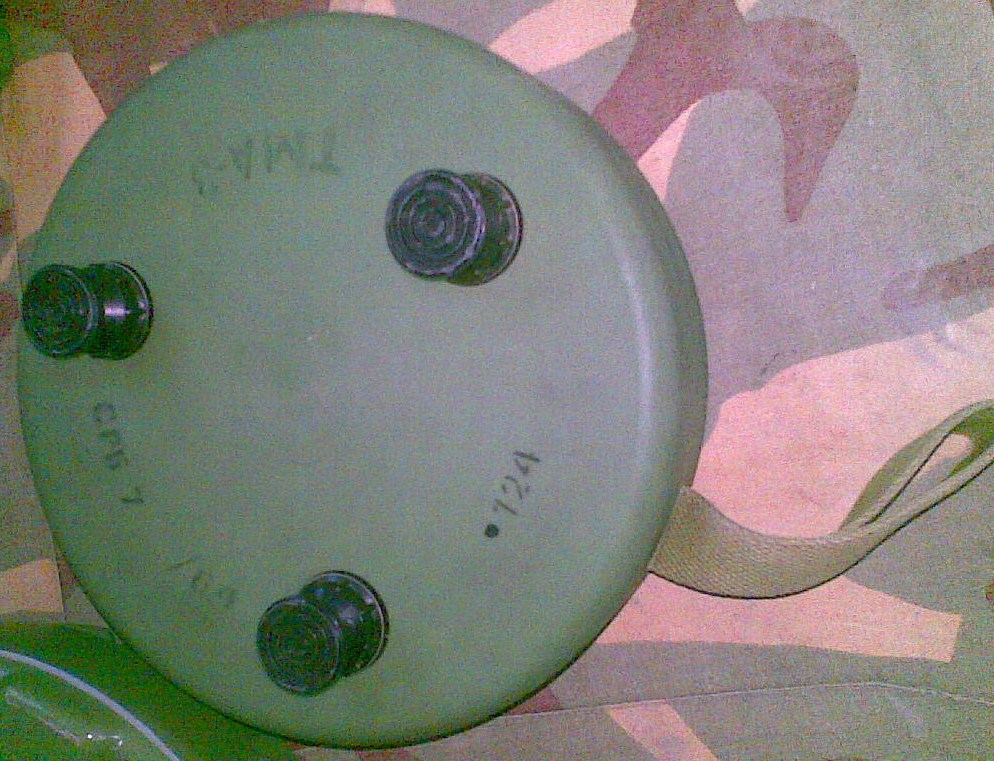
A TMA-3

The TMA-3 is a circular Yugoslavian minimum metal anti-tank blast mine. It is very similar in appearance to the TMA-4. The mine consists of a cast circular block of explosive cased in resin reinforced fabric. The top of the mine has three fuze wells which each take a UTMA-3 fuze, and a fourth secondary fuze well is provided in the base of the mine to fit an anti-handling device. The fuze wells may also accept a number of other fuzes, including the UPROM-1, and other fuzes, potentially allowing tripwire activation. The small pressure plate area of the UTMA-3 fuzes gives the mine good resistance to minefield clearance techniques which used blast overpressure techniques i.e. explosive charges.

The mine is found in Bosnia, Croatia, Kosovo, and Lebanon. It was also deployed extensively in Angola and Namibia by the People's Liberation Army of Namibia (PLAN) during the South African Border War.

== Specifications ==
- Diameter: 265 mm
- Height (with fuze): 110 mm
- Weight: 7 kg
- Explosive content: 6.5 kg of TNT
- Operating pressure: 180 kg
