= TMA-4 mine =

Anti-tank mine

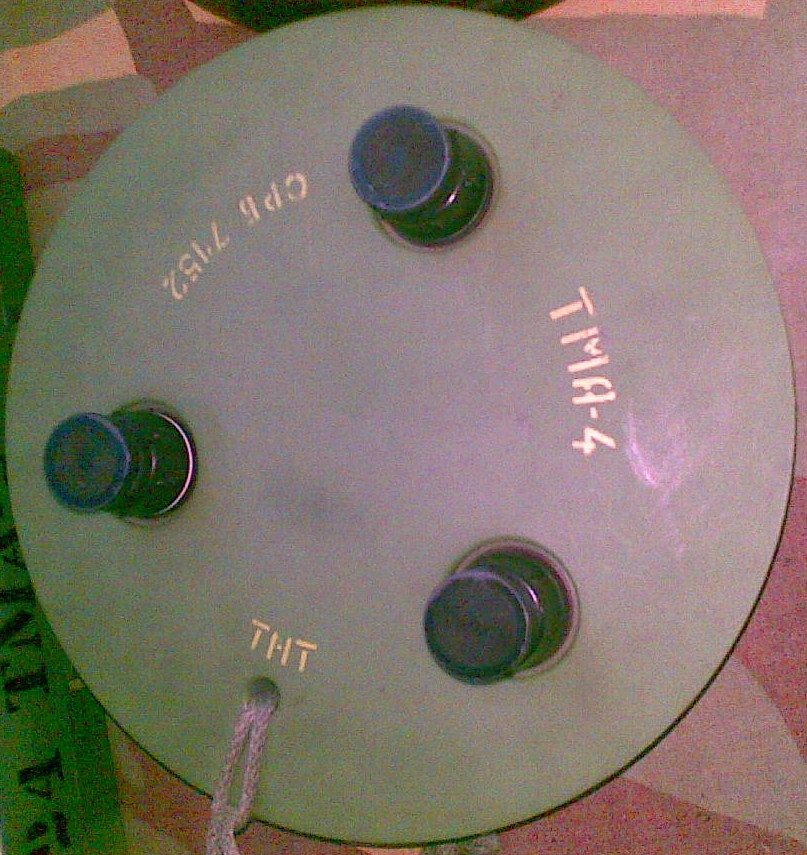
A TMA-4

The TMA-4 is a circular plastic cased Yugoslavian minimum metal anti-tank blast mine. It is a modernized version of the TMA-3. The mine is basically a cast block of TNT with three fuze wells cut into it, encased in plastic. Three black plastic UTMA-4 fuzes are installed into the top surface of the mine. A thin rope carry handle is also provided. The small pressure plate area of the fuzes make the mine resistant to overpressure from explosive demining techniques. Additionally the low metal content of the mine make it very difficult to detect. Although no secondary fuze well is provided, it is possible that the mine could be fitted with improvised anti-handling devices.

The mine is found in Albania, Angola, Bosnia, Chad, Croatia, Kosovo, Lebanon, Namibia, Sudan, and Western Sahara.

== Specifications ==
- Diameter: 284 mm
- Height (with fuse): 110 mm
- Weight: 6 kg
- Explosive content: 5.5 kg of TNT
- Operating pressure: 100 to 200 kg
