= Darreh Ney =

Darreh Ney (Persian: دره ني) may refer to:

- Darreh Ney, Bagh-e Malek, Khuzestan Province
- Darreh Ney-ye Olya, Behbahan County, Khuzestan Province
- Darreh Ney-ye Sofla, Behbahan County, Khuzestan Province
- Darreh Ney, Ramhormoz, Khuzestan Province
- Darreh Ney, Kohgiluyeh and Boyer-Ahmad
