= Kurdistan (disambiguation) =

Kurdistan is a geo-cultural region consisting of parts of Turkey, Iraq, Iran and Syria.

- Iranian Kurdistan, a geocultural region in Iran
- Iraqi Kurdistan, a geocultural region in Iraq, (see Kurdistan Region for the autonomous region)
- Syrian Kurdistan, a geocultural region in Syria, (see Democratic Autonomous Administration of North and East Syria for the autonomous administration)
- Turkish Kurdistan, a geocultural region in Turkey
- Ottoman Kurdistan, a former geocultural region of the Ottoman Empire

Kurdistan may also refer to:

== Administrative divisions ==
- Kurdistan province, one of the provinces of Iran
- Kurdistan Okrug, a former Soviet administrative unit (30 May–23 July 1930)
- Kurdistan Uyezd, a former Soviet administrative unit (1923–1929), also known as "Red Kurdistan"
- Kurdistan Eyalet, a former Ottoman administrative unit (1846–1867), one of the eyalets of the Ottoman Empire
- Safavid Kurdistan, a former Safavid administrative unit (1508–1736), one of the ostans of Safavid Iran

== States ==
- Republic of Mahabad, a short-lived Soviet puppet state (1946) in Iranian Kurdistan
- Kingdom of Kurdistan, a short-lived and unrecognized state (1922–1924) in Iraqi Kurdistan

== Villages ==
- Kordestan-e Bozorg, Khuzestan province, Iran
- Kordestan-e Kuchek, Khuzestan province, Iran
- Shahrak-e Kordestan, Khuzestan province, Iran

== Other ==
- Kurdistan newt, species of salamander
- Kurdistan (newspaper), the first Kurdish-language newspaper
- MV Kurdistan, oil tanker which spilled off the coast of Canada

== See also ==
- Kurd (disambiguation)
