= Bejak =

Bejak or Bajk (Persian: بجك) may refer to:

- Bajk, Hormozgan
- Bejak, Khuzestan
- Bejak-e Bon, Khuzestan Province
