= Mohammad Aqa Aqajari =

Mohammad Aqa Aqajari محمدآقا آقاجاری
- Village
- Location within Iran
- Coordinates: 30°43′59″N 50°09′51″E
- Country: Iran
- Province: Khuzestan
- County: Behbahan
- Bakhsh: Central
- Rural District: Dodangeh

Population (2006)
  - Total: 374
- Time zone: UTC+3:30 (IRST)
  - Summer (DST): UTC+4:30 (IRDT)

Mohammad Aqa Aqajari (Persian: محمدآقا آقاجاری, also Romanized as Moḩammad Āqā Āqājarī; also known as Keykāvūs-e Āghājārī and Moḩammad Āqājarī) is a village in Dodangeh Rural District, in the Central District of Behbahan County, Khuzestan Province, Iran. At the 2006 census, its population was 374, in 85 families.
