= Tall-e Shirazi =

Coordinates: 30°34′38″N 50°16′55″E

Tall-e Shirazi تل شيرازي
- Village
- Interactive map of Tall-e Shirazi
- Country: Iran
- Province: Khuzestan
- County: Behbahan
- Bakhsh: Central
- Rural District: Howmeh

Population (2006)
  - Total: 74
- Time zone: UTC+3:30 (IRST)
  - Summer (DST): UTC+4:30 (IRDT)

Tall-e Shirazi (Persian: تل شيرازي, also Romanized as Tall-e Shīrāzī) is a village in Howmeh Rural District, in the Central District of Behbahan County, Khuzestan Province, Iran. At the 2006 census, its population was 74, in 15 families.
