= Seh Konar =

Seh Konar سه كنار
- Village
- Location within Iran
- Coordinates: 30°26′20″N 50°19′57″E
- Country: Iran
- Province: Khuzestan
- County: Behbahan
- Bakhsh: Central
- Rural District: Howmeh

Population (2006)
  - Total: 131
- Time zone: UTC+3:30 (IRST)
  - Summer (DST): UTC+4:30 (IRDT)

Seh Konar (Persian: سه كنار, also Romanized as Seh Konār) is a village in Howmeh Rural District, in the Central District of Behbahan County, Khuzestan Province, Iran. At the 2006 census, its population was 131, in 27 families.
