= Qaleh-ye Taqi =

Qaleh-ye Taqi قلعه تقي
- Village
- Location within Iran
- Coordinates: 30°39′01″N 50°12′55″E
- Country: Iran
- Province: Khuzestan
- County: Behbahan
- Bakhsh: Central
- Rural District: Howmeh

Population (2006)
  - Total: 50
- Time zone: UTC+3:30 (IRST)
  - Summer (DST): UTC+4:30 (IRDT)

Qaleh-ye Taqi (Persian: قلعه تقي, also Romanized as Qal‘eh-ye Taqī; also known as Qal‘eh-ye Ra’īs Taqī) is a village in Howmeh Rural District, in the Central District of Behbahan County, Khuzestan Province, Iran. At the 2006 census, its population was 50, in 12 families.
