= Piazkar =

Piazkar پيازكار
- Village
- Location within Iran
- Coordinates: 30°45′30″N 50°04′43″E
- Country: Iran
- Province: Khuzestan
- County: Behbahan
- Bakhsh: Tashan
- Rural District: Tashan-e Gharbi

Population (2006)
  - Total: 397
- Time zone: UTC+3:30 (IRST)
  - Summer (DST): UTC+4:30 (IRDT)

Piazkar (Persian: پيازكار, also Romanized as Pīāzḵār, Pīāz Kār, and Pīyāz Kār; also known as Pīāzkār-e Rāhdār) is a village in Tashan-e Gharbi Rural District, Tashan District, Behbahan County, Khuzestan Province, Iran. At the 2006 census, its population was 397, in 81 families.
