= Tall-e Bardi =

Tall-e Bardi تل بردي
- Village
- Location within Iran
- Coordinates: 30°43′43″N 50°11′34″E
- Country: Iran
- Province: Khuzestan
- County: Behbahan
- Bakhsh: Central
- Rural District: Dodangeh

Population (2006)
  - Total: 125
- Time zone: UTC+3:30 (IRST)
  - Summer (DST): UTC+4:30 (IRDT)

Tall-e Bardi (Persian: تل بردي, also Romanized as Tall-e Bardī, Tall Bardī, and Tol-e Bardī) is a village in Dodangeh Rural District, in the Central District of Behbahan County, Khuzestan Province, Iran. At the 2006 census, its population was 125, in 19 families.
