= Hasan Qoli Khan =

Hasan Qoli Khan حسنقلي خان
- Village
- Country: Iran
- Province: Khuzestan
- County: Behbahan
- Bakhsh: Central
- Rural District: Dodangeh

Population (2006)
  - Total: 45
- Time zone: UTC+3:30 (IRST)
  - Summer (DST): UTC+4:30 (IRDT)

Hasan Qoli Khan (Persian: حسنقلي خان, also Romanized as Ḩasan Qolī Khān) is a village in Dodangeh Rural District, in the Central District of Behbahan County, Khuzestan Province, Iran. At the 2006 census, its population was 45, in 9 families.
