= Mansur Beygi =

Mansur Beygi منصوربيگي
- Village
- Location within Iran
- Coordinates: 30°41′12″N 50°10′31″E
- Country: Iran
- Province: Khuzestan
- County: Behbahan
- Bakhsh: Central
- Rural District: Dodangeh

Population (2006)
  - Total: 161
- Time zone: UTC+3:30 (IRST)
  - Summer (DST): UTC+4:30 (IRDT)

Mansur Beygi (Persian: منصوربيگي, also Romanized as Manşūr Beygī) is a village in Dodangeh Rural District, in the Central District of Behbahan County, Khuzestan Province, Iran. At the 2006 census, its population was 161, in 31 families.
