= Balyavi =

Balyavi بالياوي
- Village
- Location within Iran
- Coordinates: 30°52′00″N 50°10′00″E
- Country: Iran
- Province: Khuzestan
- County: Behbahan
- Bakhsh: Tashan
- Rural District: Tashan-e Sharqi

Population (2006)
  - Total: 297
- Time zone: UTC+3:30 (IRST)
  - Summer (DST): UTC+4:30 (IRDT)

Balyavi (Persian: بالياوي, also Romanized as Bālyāvī) is a village in Tashan-e Sharqi Rural District, Tashan District, Behbahan County, Khuzestan Province, Iran. At the 2006 census, its population was 297, in 61 families.
