= Shahrak-e Danshegah Valiasr =

Shahrak-e Danshegah Valiasr شهرك دانشگاه وليعصر
- Village
- Country: Iran
- Province: Khuzestan
- County: Behbahan
- Bakhsh: Central
- Rural District: Howmeh

Population (2006)
  - Total: 450
- Time zone: UTC+3:30 (IRST)
  - Summer (DST): UTC+4:30 (IRDT)

Shahrak-e Danshegah Valiasr (Persian: شهرك دانشگاه وليعصر, also Romanized as Shahrak-e Dānshegāh Valī ʿAṣr) is a village in Howmeh Rural District, in the Central District of Behbahan County, Khuzestan Province, Iran. At the 2006 census, its population was 450, in 92 families.
