= Darreh-ye Garmabeh =

Darreh-ye Garmabeh دره گرمابه
- Village
- Country: Iran
- Province: Khuzestan
- County: Behbahan
- Bakhsh: Central
- Rural District: Howmeh

Population (2006)
  - Total: 17
- Time zone: UTC+3:30 (IRST)
  - Summer (DST): UTC+4:30 (IRDT)

Darreh-ye Garmabeh (Persian: دره گرمابه, also Romanized as Darreh-ye Garmābeh) is a village in Howmeh Rural District, in the Central District of Behbahan County, Khuzestan Province, Iran. At the 2006 census, its population was 17, in 5 families.
