= Lasbid =

Lasbid لاسبيد
- Village
- Location within Iran
- Coordinates: 30°39′24″N 50°08′57″E
- Country: Iran
- Province: Khuzestan
- County: Behbahan
- Bakhsh: Central
- Rural District: Howmeh

Population (2006)
  - Total: 169
- Time zone: UTC+3:30 (IRST)
  - Summer (DST): UTC+4:30 (IRDT)

Lasbid (Persian: لاسبيد, also Romanized as Lasbīd and Lāsbīd; also known as Lāspīd) is a village in Howmeh Rural District, in the Central District of Behbahan County, Khuzestan Province, Iran. At the 2006 census, its population was 169, in 30 families.
