= Ab Baran =

Ab Baran اب باران
- Village
- Location within Iran
- Coordinates: 30°44′34″N 49°55′07″E
- Country: Iran
- Province: Khuzestan
- County: Behbahan
- Bakhsh: Tashan
- Rural District: Tashan-e Gharbi

Population (2006)
  - Total: 85
- Time zone: UTC+3:30 (IRST)
  - Summer (DST): UTC+4:30 (IRDT)

Ab Baran (Persian: اب باران, also Romanized as Āb Bārān) is a village in Tashan-e Gharbi Rural District, Tashan District, Behbahan County, Khuzestan province, Iran. At the 2006 census, its population was 85 in 15 families.
