= Shah-e Pirabad =

Shah-e Pirabad شاه پيراباد
- Village
- Location within Iran
- Coordinates: 30°47′52″N 50°13′10″E
- Country: Iran
- Province: Khuzestan
- County: Behbahan
- Bakhsh: Tashan
- Rural District: Tashan-e Sharqi

Population (2006)
  - Total: 619
- Time zone: UTC+3:30 (IRST)
  - Summer (DST): UTC+4:30 (IRDT)

Shah-e Pirabad (Persian: شاه پيراباد, also Romanized as Shāh-e Pīrābād) is a village in Tashan-e Sharqi Rural District, Tashan District, Behbahan County, Khuzestan Province, Iran. At the 2006 census, its population was 619, in 132 families.
