= Chargeli =

Chargeli چرگلي
- Village
- Location within Iran
- Coordinates: 30°42′23″N 50°03′17″E
- Country: Iran
- Province: Khuzestan
- County: Behbahan
- Bakhsh: Tashan
- Rural District: Tashan-e Gharbi

Population (2006)
  - Total: 45
- Time zone: UTC+3:30 (IRST)
  - Summer (DST): UTC+4:30 (IRDT)

Chargeli (Persian: چرگلي, also Romanized as Chargelī) is a village in Tashan-e Gharbi Rural District, Tashan District, Behbahan County, Khuzestan Province, Iran. At the 2006 census, its population was 45, in 13 families.
