= Shahrui =

Shahrooei شهرويي
- village
- Location within Iran
- Coordinates: 30°44′24″N 50°09′18″E
- Country: Iran
- Province: Khuzestan
- County: Behbahan
- Bakhsh: Central
- Rural District: Dodangeh

Population (2006)
  - Total: 1,951
- Time zone: UTC+3:30 (IRST)
  - Summer (DST): UTC+4:30 (IRDT)

Shahrooei (Shahruei) (Persian: شهرويي, also Romanized as Shahrū’ī; also known as Sharū’ī) is a village in Dodangeh Rural District, in the Central District of Behbahan County, Khuzestan Province, Iran. At the 2006 census, its population was 1,951, in 419 families.
