= Deh-e Ebrahim, Khuzestan =

Neighborhood in Khuzestan province, Iran

Deh-e Ebrahim Persian: ده ابراهيم
- Neighborhood
- Location within Iran
- Coordinates: 30°53′44″N 50°35′47″E
- Country: Iran
- Province: Khuzestan
- County: Behbahan
- District: Tashan
- City: Tashan

Population (2011)
  - Total: 780
- Time zone: UTC+3:30 (IRST)

Deh-e Ebrahim (Persian: ده ابراهيم) (Note: Also romanized as Deh Ebrāhīm and Deh-e Ebrāhīm; also known as Ebrāhīm and Shahsavār) is a neighborhood in the city of Tashan in Tashan District, Behbahan County, Khuzestan province, Iran.

== Demographics ==
=== Population ===
At the time of the 2006 National Census, Deh-e Ebrahim's population was 796 in 178 households, when it was a village in Tashan-e Sharqi Rural District. (Note: Formerly Tashan Rural District) The following census in 2011 counted 780 people in 195 households.

In 2013, the village of Mashhad merged with the villages of Ablesh, Chahardahi-ye Asgar, Chahardahi-ye Sohrab, Deh-e Ebrahim, Kalgeh Zar, Masiri, Sarallah, Shahrak-e Taleqani, and Tall Kohneh to form the city of Tashan.
