= Mangelas-e Bozorg =

Mangelas-e Bozorg منگلاس بزرگ
- Village
- Location within Iran
- Coordinates: 30°28′14″N 50°14′34″E
- Country: Iran
- Province: Khuzestan
- County: Behbahan
- Bakhsh: Central
- Rural District: Howmeh

Population (2006)
  - Total: 66
- Time zone: UTC+3:30 (IRST)
  - Summer (DST): UTC+4:30 (IRDT)

Mangelas-e Bozorg (Persian: منگلاس بزرگ, lit. 'Grand Mangelas', also Romanized as Mangelās-e Bozorg) is a village in Howmeh Rural District, in the Central District of Behbahan County, Khuzestan Province, Iran. At the 2006 census, its population was 66, in 13 families.
