= Al-e Tayyeb =

Al-e Tayyeb ال طيب
- Village
- Location within Iran
- Coordinates: 30°44′30″N 50°11′38″E
- Country: Iran
- Province: Khuzestan
- County: Behbahan
- Bakhsh: Central
- Rural District: Dodangeh

Population (2006)
  - Total: 516
- Time zone: UTC+3:30 (IRST)
  - Summer (DST): UTC+4:30 (IRDT)

Al-e Tayyeb (Persian: ال طيب, also Romanized as Āl-e Ţayyeb; also known as ‘Alī Tayāb, ‘Alī Ţayebī, and ‘Alī Tīāb) is a village in Dodangeh Rural District, in the Central District of Behbahan County, Khuzestan Province, Iran. At the 2006 census, its population was 516, in 96 families.
