= Dow Dangeh =

Dow Dangeh or Do Dangeh or Dodangeh (Persian: دودانگه) may refer to:

- Do Dangeh, Golestan
- Dodangeh-ye Bozorg, Khuzestan Province
- Dodangeh-ye Kuchak, Khuzestan Province
- Dow Dangeh, Lorestan
- Dodangeh District, Mazandaran Province, Iran
- Dodangeh Rural District (East Azerbaijan Province), Iran
- Dodangeh Rural District (Khuzestan Province), Iran

== See also ==
- Dodangeh (disambiguation)
