= Cham-e Menaf =

Coordinates: 30°40′25″N 49°59′08″E

Cham-e Menaf چم مناف
- Village
- Interactive map of Cham-e Menaf
- Country: Iran
- Province: Khuzestan
- County: Behbahan
- Bakhsh: Central
- Rural District: Howmeh

Population (2006)
  - Total: 27
- Time zone: UTC+3:30 (IRST)
  - Summer (DST): UTC+4:30 (IRDT)

Cham-e Menaf (Persian: چم مناف, also Romanized as Cham-e Menāf) is a village in Howmeh Rural District, in the Central District of Behbahan County, Khuzestan Province, Iran. At the 2006 census, its population was 27, in 7 families.
