= Chahar Asiab =

Chahar Asiab چهاراسياب
- village
- Location within Iran
- Coordinates: 30°39′03″N 50°10′27″E
- Country: Iran
- Province: Khuzestan
- County: Behbahan
- Bakhsh: Central
- Rural District: Howmeh

Population (2006)
  - Total: 128
- Time zone: UTC+3:30 (IRST)
  - Summer (DST): UTC+4:30 (IRDT)
- Area code: 0093

Chahar Asiab (Persian: چهاراسياب, also Romanized as Chahār Āsīāb) is a village in Howmeh Rural District, in the Central District of Behbahan County, Khuzestan Province, Iran. At the 2006 census, its population was 128, in 31 families.
