= Qaleh-ye Puladi =

Qaleh-ye Puladi قلعه پولادي
- Village
- Location within Iran
- Coordinates: 30°39′40″N 50°11′57″E
- Country: Iran
- Province: Khuzestan
- County: Behbahan
- Bakhsh: Central
- Rural District: Dodangeh

Population (2006)
  - Total: 116
- Time zone: UTC+3:30 (IRST)
  - Summer (DST): UTC+4:30 (IRDT)

Qaleh-ye Puladi (Persian: قلعه پولادي, also Romanized as Qal‘eh-ye Pūlādī; also known as Qalehfolādī) is a village in Dodangeh Rural District, in the Central District of Behbahan County, Khuzestan Province, Iran. At the 2006 census, its population was 116, in 25 families.
