= Tileh Kuh =

Tileh Kuh تيله كوه
- Village
- Location within Iran
- Coordinates: 30°25′09″N 50°20′07″E
- Country: Iran
- Province: Khuzestan
- County: Behbahan
- Bakhsh: Central
- Rural District: Howmeh

Population (2006)
  - Total: 143
- Time zone: UTC+3:30 (IRST)
  - Summer (DST): UTC+4:30 (IRDT)

Tileh Kuh (Persian: تيله كوه, also Romanized as Tīleh Kūh; also known as Nīleh Kūh) is a village in Howmeh Rural District, in the Central District of Behbahan County, Khuzestan Province, Iran. At the 2006 census, its population was 143, in 29 families.
