= Khayiz =

Khaeez خائيز
- Village
- Location within Iran
- Coordinates: 30°38′50″N 50°23′15″E
- Country: Iran
- Province: Khuzestan
- County: Behbahan
- Bakhsh: Central
- Rural District: Howmeh

Population (2006)
  - Total: 153
- Time zone: UTC+3:30 (IRST)
  - Summer (DST): UTC+4:30 (IRDT)

Khaeez (Persian: خائيز, also Romanized as Khaeez; also known as Khaeez) is a village in Howmeh Rural District, in the Central District of Behbahan County, Khuzestan Province, Iran. At the 2006 census, its population was 153, in 31 families.
