= Yusufi =

Yusufi may refer to:

- Yusufzai, a major tribe of Pashtuns
- Mushtaq Ahmad Yusufi, an Urdu satirical and humor writer
- Mohammed Nabi Yusufi, an Afghan community leader and Imam
- Yusefi, village in Iran
- Yousefi, Persian surname
