= Silabak =

Silabak سيلابك
- Village
- Location within Iran
- Coordinates: 30°39′51″N 50°10′15″E
- Country: Iran
- Province: Khuzestan
- County: Behbahan
- Bakhsh: Central
- Rural District: Dodangeh

Population (2006)
  - Total: 35
- Time zone: UTC+3:30 (IRST)
  - Summer (DST): UTC+4:30 (IRDT)

Silabak (Persian: سيلابك, also Romanized as Sīlābak; also known as Seylāvak) is a village in Dodangeh Rural District, in the Central District of Behbahan County, Khuzestan Province, Iran. At the 2006 census, its population was 35, in 7 families.
