= Pashgar =

Pashgar پشگر
- Village
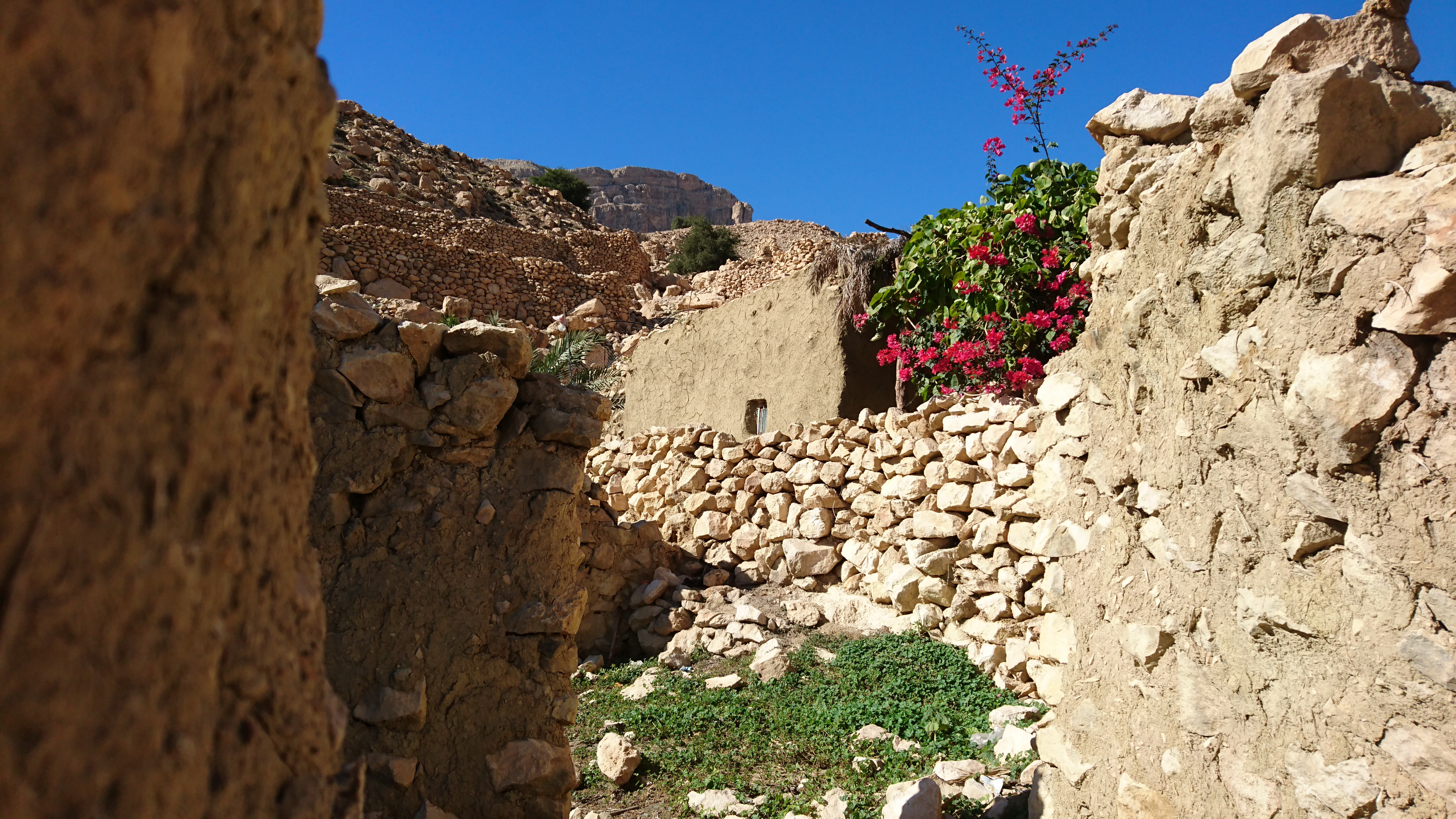

- Location within Iran
- Coordinates: 30°41′39″N 50°20′41″E
- Country: Iran
- Province: Khuzestan
- County: Behbahan
- Bakhsh: Central
- Rural District: Dodangeh

Population (2006)
  - Total: 31
- Time zone: UTC+3:30 (IRST)
  - Summer (DST): UTC+4:30 (IRDT)

Pashgar (Persian: پشگر, also Romanized as Pashkar) is a village in Dodangeh Rural District, in the Central District of Behbahan County, Khuzestan Province, Iran. At the 2006 census, its population was 31, in 6 families.
