= Cham-e Siah =

Cham-e Siah چم سياه
- Village
- Location within Iran
- Coordinates: 30°46′48″N 50°22′48″E
- Country: Iran
- Province: Khuzestan
- County: Behbahan
- Bakhsh: Central
- Rural District: Howmeh

Population (2006)
  - Total: 118
- Time zone: UTC+3:30 (IRST)
  - Summer (DST): UTC+4:30 (IRDT)

Cham-e Siah (Persian: چم سياه, also Romanized as Cham-e Sīāh) is a village in Howmeh Rural District, in the Central District of Behbahan County, Khuzestan Province, Iran. At the 2006 census, its population was 118, in 22 families.
