= Borj-e Bemuni Aqa =

Borj-e Bemuni Aqa برج بموني اقا
- Village
- Location within Iran
- Coordinates: 30°28′10″N 50°20′16″E
- Country: Iran
- Province: Khuzestan
- County: Behbahan
- Bakhsh: Central
- Rural District: Howmeh

Population (2006)
  - Total: 180
- Time zone: UTC+3:30 (IRST)
  - Summer (DST): UTC+4:30 (IRDT)

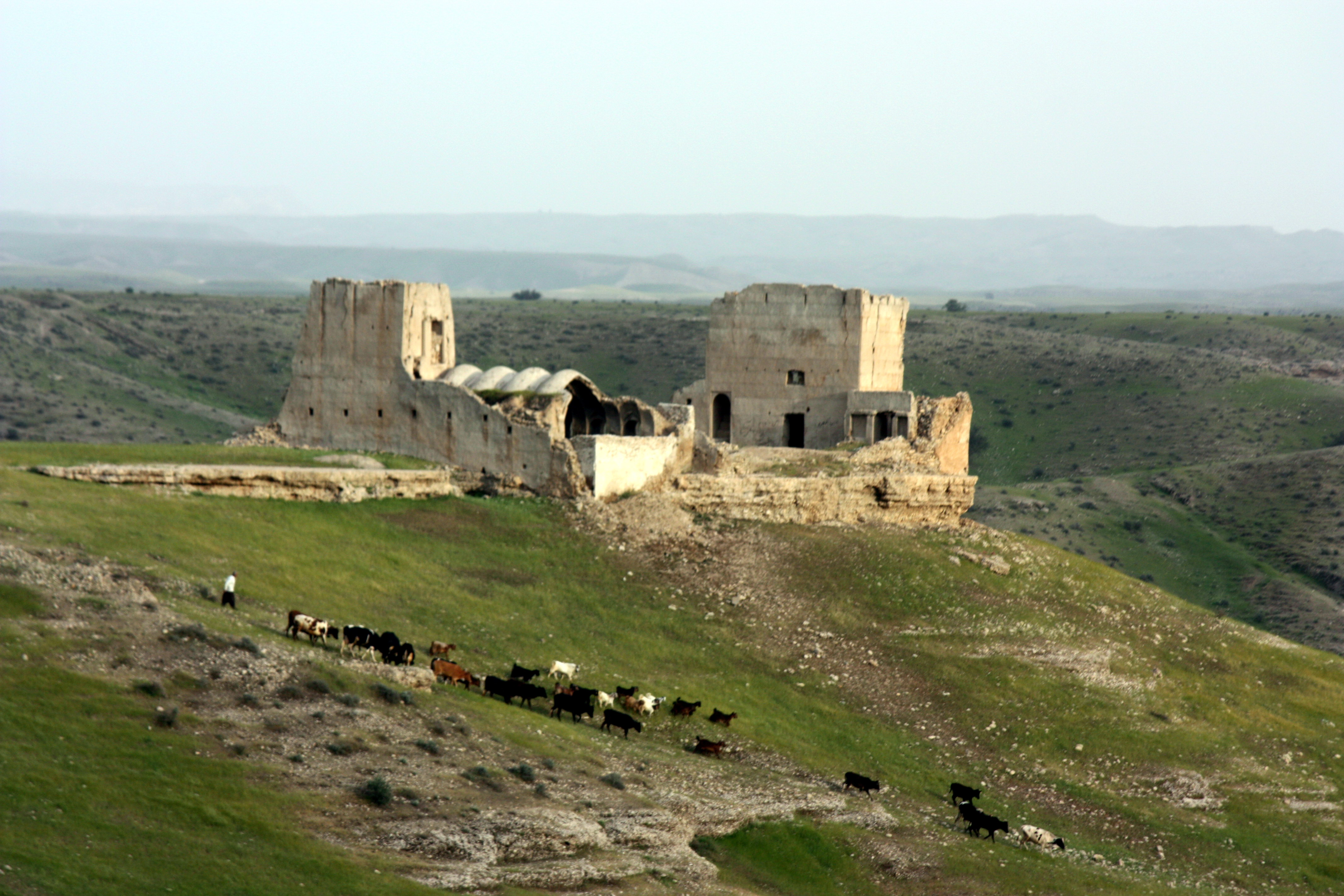

Borj-e Bemuni Aqa (Persian: برج بموني اقا, also Romanized as Borj-e Bemūnī Āqā; also known as Borj-e Mollā Valī Khān and Būbūnī Āqā) is a village in Howmeh Rural District, in the Central District of Behbahan County, Khuzestan Province, Iran. At the 2006 census, its population was 180, in 35 families.
