= Shahrak-e Motahhari =

Shahrak-e Motahhari شهرك مطهري
- Village
- Location within Iran
- Coordinates: 30°48′35″N 50°09′26″E
- Country: Iran
- Province: Khuzestan
- County: Behbahan
- Bakhsh: Tashan
- Rural District: Tashan-e Gharbi

Population (2006)
  - Total: 577
- Time zone: UTC+3:30 (IRST)
  - Summer (DST): UTC+4:30 (IRDT)

Shahrak-e Motahhari (Persian: شهرك مطهري, also Romanized as Shahrak-e Moţahharī; also known as Shahrak-e Moţahharī-ye Varzard and Var-e Zard) is a village in Tashan-e Gharbi Rural District, Tashan District, Behbahan County, Khuzestan Province, Iran. At the 2006 census, its population was 577, in 107 families.
