= Mashhadi (disambiguation) =

Mashhadi is of, or pertaining to, the Iranian city of Mashhad.

Mashhadi (Persian: مشهدی) may also refer to:

== Geography ==
- Mashhadi, Khuzestan
- Mashhadi Barag Jar
- Mashhadi Hoseyn
- Mashhadi Jafar
- Mashhadi Juzi
- Mashhadi Mohammad
- Qeshlaq-e Mashhadi Mohammad

== People ==
- Mashhadi Jews
- Sultan Ali Mashhadi (1453-1520), Persian calligrapher and poet
- Tahir Hussain Mashhadi (b. 1942), Pakistani military officer
