= Qaleh-ye Tileh Kuh =

Qaleh-ye Tileh Kuh قلعه تيله كوه
- Village
- Country: Iran
- Province: Khuzestan
- County: Behbahan
- Bakhsh: Central
- Rural District: Dodangeh

Population (2006)
  - Total: 74
- Time zone: UTC+3:30 (IRST)
  - Summer (DST): UTC+4:30 (IRDT)

Qaleh-ye Tileh Kuh (Persian: قلعه تيله كوه, also Romanized as Qal‘eh-ye Tīleh Kūh) is a village in Dodangeh Rural District, in the Central District of Behbahan County, Khuzestan Province, Iran.

== Population ==
At the 2006 census, its population was 74, in 13 families.
