= Jamal Jahan =

Jamal Jahan جمال جهان
- Village
- Location within Iran
- Coordinates: 30°48′28″N 50°02′21″E
- Country: Iran
- Province: Khuzestan
- County: Behbahan
- Bakhsh: Tashan
- Rural District: Tashan-e Gharbi

Population (2006)
  - Total: 116
- Time zone: UTC+3:30 (IRST)
  - Summer (DST): UTC+4:30 (IRDT)

Jamal Jahan (Persian: جمال جهان, also Romanized as Jamāl Jahān) is a village in Tashan-e Gharbi Rural District, Tashan District, Behbahan County, Khuzestan Province, Iran. At the 2006 census, its population was 116, in 18 families.
