= Tang-e Vard =

Tang-e Vard تنگورد
- Village
- Location within Iran
- Coordinates: 30°45′27″N 50°03′31″E
- Country: Iran
- Province: Khuzestan
- County: Behbahan
- Bakhsh: Tashan
- Rural District: Tashan-e Gharbi

Population (2006)
  - Total: 79
- Time zone: UTC+3:30 (IRST)
  - Summer (DST): UTC+4:30 (IRDT)

Tang-e Vard (Persian: تنگورد; also known as Āb-e Sang Āb and Āb Sangāb) is a village in Tashan-e Gharbi Rural District, Tashan District, Behbahan County, Khuzestan Province, Iran. At the 2006 census, its population was 79, in 13 families.
