= Darreh Bazar =

Darreh Bazar دره بازار
- Village
- Location within Iran
- Coordinates: 30°36′46″N 50°22′42″E
- Country: Iran
- Province: Khuzestan
- County: Behbahan
- Bakhsh: Central
- Rural District: Howmeh

Population (2006)
  - Total: 48
- Time zone: UTC+3:30 (IRST)
  - Summer (DST): UTC+4:30 (IRDT)

Darreh Bazar (Persian: دره بازار, also Romanized as Darreh Bāzār) is a village in Howmeh Rural District, in the Central District of Behbahan County, Khuzestan Province, Iran. At the 2006 census, its population was 48, in 9 families.
