= Derb-e Ruz Ali =

Derb-e Ruz Ali دربروزعلي
- Village
- Location within Iran
- Coordinates: 30°50′32″N 50°10′34″E
- Country: Iran
- Province: Khuzestan
- County: Behbahan
- Bakhsh: Tashan
- Rural District: Tashan-e Sharqi

Population (2006)
  - Total: 40
- Time zone: UTC+3:30 (IRST)
  - Summer (DST): UTC+4:30 (IRDT)

Derb-e Ruz Ali (Persian: دربروزعلي, also Romanized as Derb-e Rūz ‘Alī; also known as Dabar-e Rūz ‘Alī) is a village in Tashan-e Sharqi Rural District, Tashan District, Behbahan County, Khuzestan Province, Iran. At the 2006 census, its population was 40, in 7 families.
