= Hayatabad (disambiguation) =

Hayatabad may refer to:

- Hayatabad township is a suburb of Peshawar, Pakistan
- Hayatabad village or hamlet, sometimes also called 'Kot Hayat', near Sheikhupura, Pakistan, named after Nawab Muhammad Hayat Khan, CSI.

Hayatabad (Persian: حيات اباد) may also refer to:

- Hayatabad-e Khalifeh, Iran
- Hayatabad-e Majidi, Iran
- Heyatabad (disambiguation)
