= Eslamabad-e Sofla, Khuzestan =

Village in Khuzestan province, Iran

Eslamabad-e Sofla Persian: اسلام اباد سفلي
- Village
- Location within Iran
- Coordinates: 30°35′20″N 50°16′19″E
- Country: Iran
- Province: Khuzestan
- County: Behbahan
- District: Central
- Rural District: Howmeh

Population (2016)
  - Total: 2,900
- Time zone: UTC+3:30 (IRST)

Eslamabad-e Sofla (Persian: اسلام ابادسفلي) (Note: Also romanized as Eslāmābād-e Soflá; also known as Eslāmābād-e Sangborī) is a village in Howmeh Rural District of the Central District of Behbahan County, Khuzestan province, Iran.

== Demographics ==
=== Population ===
At the time of the 2006 National Census, the village's population was 1,683 in 353 households. The following census in 2011 counted 1,909 people in 448 households. The 2016 census measured the population of the village as 2,900 people in 720 households. It was the most populous village in its rural district.
