= Dodangeh-ye Kuchak =

Dodangeh-ye Kuchak دودانگه كوچك
- Village
- Location within Iran
- Coordinates: 30°43′24″N 50°10′11″E
- Country: Iran
- Province: Khuzestan
- County: Behbahan
- Bakhsh: Central
- Rural District: Dodangeh

Population (2006)
  - Total: 512
- Time zone: UTC+3:30 (IRST)
  - Summer (DST): UTC+4:30 (IRDT)

Dodangeh-ye Kuchak (Persian: دودانگه كوچك, also Romanized as Dodāngeh-ye Kūchak, Do Dāngeh Kūchek, Do Dāngeh-ye Kūchek, and Dow Dāngeh-ye Kūchak) is a village in Dodangeh Rural District, in the Central District of Behbahan County, Khuzestan Province, Iran. At the 2006 census, its population was 512, in 116 families.
