= Sar Jowshar-e Ahhad =

Sar Jowshar-e Ahhad سرجوشراحد
- Village
- Location within Iran
- Coordinates: 30°51′21″N 50°09′54″E
- Country: Iran
- Province: Khuzestan
- County: Behbahan
- Bakhsh: Tashan
- Rural District: Tashan-e Sharqi

Population (2006)
  - Total: 52
- Time zone: UTC+3:30 (IRST)
  - Summer (DST): UTC+4:30 (IRDT)

Sar Jowshar-e Ahhad (Persian: سرجوشراحد, also Romanized as Sar Jowshar-e Aḩḩad) is a village in Tashan-e Sharqi Rural District, Tashan District, Behbahan County, Khuzestan Province, Iran. At the 2006 census, its population was 52, in 11 families.
