= Qaland-e Vosta =

Qaland-e Vosta قالندوسطي
- Village
- Location within Iran
- Coordinates: 30°40′27″N 50°14′14″E
- Country: Iran
- Province: Khuzestan
- County: Behbahan
- Bakhsh: Central
- Rural District: Dodangeh

Population (2006)
  - Total: 764
- Time zone: UTC+3:30 (IRST)
  - Summer (DST): UTC+4:30 (IRDT)

Qaland-e Vosta (Persian: قالندوسطي, also Romanized as Qāland-e Vosţá; also known as Kāland-e Vosţá, Kāland Vostá, and Qāland) is a village in Dodangeh Rural District, in the Central District of Behbahan County, Khuzestan Province, Iran. At the 2006 census, its population was 764, in 140 families.
