= Chahardahi-ye Asgar =

Neighborhood in Khuzestan province, Iran

Chahardahi-ye Asgar Persian: چهاردهي عسگر
- Neighborhood
- Location within Iran
- Coordinates: 30°48′42″N 50°11′36″E
- Country: Iran
- Province: Khuzestan
- County: Behbahan
- District: Tashan
- City: Tashan

Population (2011)
  - Total: 178
- Time zone: UTC+3:30 (IRST)

Chahardahi-ye Asgar (Persian: چهاردهي عسگر) (Note: Also romanized as Chahārdahī-ye ‘Asgar; also known as Chahārdahī and Chahārdahī-ye ‘Askar) is a neighborhood in the city of Tashan in Tashan District, Behbahan County, Khuzestan province, Iran.

== Demographics ==
=== Population ===
At the time of the 2006 National Census, Chahardahi-ye Asgar's population was 195 in 41 households, when it was a village in Tashan-e Sharqi Rural District. (Note: Formerly Tashan Rural District) The following census in 2011 counted 178 people in 49 households.

In 2013, the village of Mashhad merged with the villages of Ablesh, Chahardahi-ye Asgar, Chahardahi-ye Sohrab, Deh-e Ebrahim, Kalgeh Zar, Masiri, Sarallah, Shahrak-e Taleqani, and Tall Kohneh to form the city of Tashan.
