= Chahardahi =

Chahardahi (Persian: چهاردهي) may refer to:

- Chahardahi-ye Asgar
- Chahardahi-ye Sohrab
