= Sar Jowshar =

Sar Jowshar (Persian: سرجوشر) may refer to:

- Sar Jowshar-e Ahhad
- Sar Jowshar-e Edalat
