= Galleh Khar =

Galleh Khar or Gallehkhar or Galeh Khar (Persian: گله خر) may refer to:

- Galleh Khar, Khuzestan
- Galeh Khar, West Azerbaijan
