= Shah Nazari =

Shah Nazari (Persian: شاه نظري) may refer to:

- Shah Nazari, Kerman
- Shah Nazari, Khuzestan
