= Dodangeh =

Dodangeh (Persian: دودانگه) may refer to:

- Dodangeh, Kerman
- Dodangeh District
- Dodangeh Rural District (disambiguation)

== See also ==
- Dow Dangeh (disambiguation)
