= Qaland-e Olya =

Qaland-e Olya قالندعليا
- Village
- Location within Iran
- Coordinates: 30°40′35″N 50°14′45″E
- Country: Iran
- Province: Khuzestan
- County: Behbahan
- Bakhsh: Central
- Rural District: Dodangeh

Population (2006)
  - Total: 795
- Time zone: UTC+3:30 (IRST)
  - Summer (DST): UTC+4:30 (IRDT)

Qaland-e Olya (Persian: قالندعليا, also Romanized as Qāland-e ‘Olyā; also known as Kāland-e ‘Olyā, Kāland ‘Olyā, and Qāland) is a village in Dodangeh Rural District, in the Central District of Behbahan County, Khuzestan Province, Iran. At the 2006 census, its population was 795, in 145 families.
