= Darreh Ney-ye Sofla =

Village in Khuzestan, Iran

Darreh Ney-ye Sofla دره ني سفلي
- Village
- Location within Iran
- Coordinates: 30°44′48″N 49°59′50″E
- Country: Iran
- Province: Khuzestan
- County: Behbahan
- Bakhsh: Tashan
- Rural District: Tashan-e Gharbi

Population (2006)
  - Total: 50
- Time zone: UTC+3:30 (IRST)
  - Summer (DST): UTC+4:30 (IRDT)

Darreh Ney-ye Sofla (Persian: دره ني سفلي, also Romanized as Darreh Ney-ye Soflá; also known as Darreh Ney and Darreh Ney-ye Pā’īn) is a village in Tashan-e Gharbi Rural District, Tashan District, Behbahan County, Khuzestan province, Iran. At the 2006 census, its population was 50, in 7 families.
