= Bid Boland =

Bid Boland or Bid-e Boland (Persian: بيدبلند) may refer to:

- Bid Boland, Bushehr
- Bid Boland, Khuzestan
