= Kordestan-e Kuchek =

Kordestan-e Kuchek كردستان كوچك
- Village
- Location within Iran
- Coordinates: 30°40′09″N 50°12′20″E
- Country: Iran
- Province: Khuzestan
- County: Behbahan
- Bakhsh: Central
- Rural District: Dodangeh

Population (2006)
  - Total: 492
- Time zone: UTC+3:30 (IRST)
  - Summer (DST): UTC+4:30 (IRDT)

Kordestan-e Kuchek (Persian: كردستان كوچك, also Romanized as Kordestān-e Kūchek; also known as Kordestān, Kordestān-e ‘Olyā, and Kurdistān) is a village in Dodangeh Rural District, in the Central District of Behbahan County, Khuzestan Province, Iran. At the 2006 census, its population was 492, in 91 families.
