= Ab Kharzahreh =

Ab Khar Zahreh or Ab Kharzahreh (Persian: اب خرزهره) may refer to:

- Ab Kharzahreh, Andika
- Ab Kharzahreh, Behbahan
