= Qaland-e Sofla =

Qaland-e Sofla قالندسفلي
- Village
- Location within Iran
- Coordinates: 30°41′14″N 50°13′43″E
- Country: Iran
- Province: Khuzestan
- County: Behbahan
- Bakhsh: Central
- Rural District: Dodangeh

Population (2006)
  - Total: 603
- Time zone: UTC+3:30 (IRST)
  - Summer (DST): UTC+4:30 (IRDT)

Qaland-e Sofla (Persian: قالندسفلي, also Romanized as Qāland-e Soflá and Qālend-e Soflá; also known as Qālend-e Pā’īn and Qālend-e Sheykhhā) is a village in Dodangeh Rural District, in the Central District of Behbahan County, Khuzestan Province, Iran. At the 2006 census, its population was 603, in 115 families.
