= Korreh Siah-e Shirin =

Korreh Siah-e Shirin كره سياه شيرين
- Village
- Location within Iran
- Coordinates: 30°41′19″N 50°08′01″E
- Country: Iran
- Province: Khuzestan
- County: Behbahan
- Bakhsh: Central
- Rural District: Dodangeh

Population (2006)
  - Total: 185
- Time zone: UTC+3:30 (IRST)
  - Summer (DST): UTC+4:30 (IRDT)

Korreh Siah-e Shirin (Persian: كره سياه شيرين, also Romanized as Korreh Sīāh-e Shīrīn and Koreh Sīāh-e Shīrīn) is a village in Dodangeh Rural District, in the Central District of Behbahan County, Khuzestan Province, Iran. At the 2006 census, its population was 185, in 41 families.
