= Ab Amiri =

Village in Khuzestan province, Iran

Ab Amiri Persian: اب اميري
- Village
- Location within Iran
- Coordinates: 30°44′03″N 50°03′46″E
- Country: Iran
- Province: Khuzestan
- County: Behbahan
- District: Tashan
- Rural District: Tashan-e Gharbi

Population (2016)
  - Total: 790
- Time zone: UTC+3:30 (IRST)

Ab Amiri (Persian: اب اميري) (Note: Also romanized as Āb Amīrī) is a village in, and the capital of, Tashan-e Gharbi Rural District of Tashan District, Behbahan County, Khuzestan province, Iran.

== Demographics ==
=== Population ===
At the time of the 2006 National Census, the village's population was 811 in 156 households. The following census in 2011 counted 852 people in 211 households. The 2016 census measured the population of the village as 790 people in 222 households. It was the most populous village in its rural district.
