= Korreh Siah =

Korreh Siah or Koreh Siah or Korreh Seyah or Korreh Siyah (Persian: گبير) may refer to:

- Korreh Siah-e Shirin
- Korreh Siah-e Talkh
