= Garmez-e Sofla =

Garmez-e Sofla گرمزسفلي
- Village
- Location within Iran
- Coordinates: 30°32′17″N 50°21′07″E
- Country: Iran
- Province: Khuzestan
- County: Behbahan
- Bakhsh: Central
- Rural District: Howmeh

Population (2006)
  - Total: 226
- Time zone: UTC+3:30 (IRST)
  - Summer (DST): UTC+4:30 (IRDT)

Garmez-e Sofla (Persian: گرمزسفلي, also Romanized as Garmez-e Soflá) is a village in Howmeh Rural District, in the Central District of Behbahan County, Khuzestan Province, Iran. At the 2006 census, its population was 226, in 58 families.
