= Garmez =

Garmez (Persian: گرمز) may refer to:

- Garmez-e Olya
- Garmez-e Sofla
