= Ab Kharzahreh, Behbahan =

Ab Kharzahreh اب خرزهره
- Village
- Location within Iran
- Coordinates: 30°46′05″N 50°03′28″E
- Country: Iran
- Province: Khuzestan
- County: Behbahan
- Bakhsh: Tashan
- Rural District: Tashan-e Gharbi

Population (2006)
  - Total: 55
- Time zone: UTC+3:30 (IRST)
  - Summer (DST): UTC+4:30 (IRDT)

Ab Kharzahreh (Persian: اب خرزهره, also Romanized as Āb Kharzahreh; also known as Āb Kharzmā) is a village in Tashan-e Gharbi Rural District, Tashan District, Behbahan County, Khuzestan Province, Iran. At the 2006 census, its population was 55, in 10 families.
