= Mashhadi Mohammad =

Mashhadi Mohammad مشهدي محمد
- Village
- Country: Iran
- Province: Khuzestan
- County: Behbahan
- Bakhsh: Central
- Rural District: Dodangeh

Population (2006)
  - Total: 43
- Time zone: UTC+3:30 (IRST)
  - Summer (DST): UTC+4:30 (IRDT)

Mashhadi Mohammad (Persian: مشهدي محمد, also Romanized as Mashhadī Moḩammad) is a village in Dodangeh Rural District, in the Central District of Behbahan County, Khuzestan Province, Iran. At the 2006 census, its population was 43, in 8 families.
