= Sar Jowshar-e Edalat =

Sar Jowshar-e Edalat سرجوشرعدالت
- Village
- Location within Iran
- Coordinates: 30°51′29″N 50°10′08″E
- Country: Iran
- Province: Khuzestan
- County: Behbahan
- Bakhsh: Tashan
- Rural District: Tashan-e Sharqi

Population (2006)
  - Total: 371
- Time zone: UTC+3:30 (IRST)
  - Summer (DST): UTC+4:30 (IRDT)

Sar Jowshar-e Edalat (Persian: سرجوشرعدالت, also Romanized as Sar Jowshar-e ‘Edālat; also known as Sar Jowshīr) is a village in Tashan-e Sharqi Rural District, Tashan District, Behbahan County, Khuzestan Province, Iran. Sina Edalat; At the 2006 census, its population was 371, in 82 families.
