= Bejak, Khuzestan =

Bejak بجك
- Village
- Location within Iran
- Coordinates: 30°52′51″N 50°11′20″E
- Country: Iran
- Province: Khuzestan
- County: Behbahan
- Bakhsh: Tashan
- Rural District: Tashan-e Sharqi

Population (2006)
  - Total: 452
- Time zone: UTC+3:30 (IRST)
  - Summer (DST): UTC+4:30 (IRDT)

Bejak (Persian: بجك; also known as Shahrak-e Emām) is a village in Tashan-e Sharqi Rural District, Tashan District, Behbahan County, Khuzestan Province, Iran. At the 2006 census, its population was 452, in 90 families.
