= Tang-e Ban =

Tang-e Ban تنگ بن
- Village
- Location within Iran
- Coordinates: 30°50′44″N 50°13′14″E
- Country: Iran
- Province: Khuzestan
- County: Behbahan
- Bakhsh: Tashan
- Rural District: Tashan-e Sharqi

Population (2006)
  - Total: 45
- Time zone: UTC+3:30 (IRST)
  - Summer (DST): UTC+4:30 (IRDT)

Tang-e Ban (Persian: تنگ بن; also known as Bejak-e Bon) is a village in Tashan-e Sharqi Rural District, Tashan District, Behbahan County, Khuzestan Province, Iran. At the 2006 census, its population was 45, in 9 families.
