= Galleh Khar, Khuzestan =

Galleh Khar گله خر
- Village
- Location within Iran
- Coordinates: 30°35′38″N 50°08′11″E
- Country: Iran
- Province: Khuzestan
- County: Behbahan
- Bakhsh: Central
- Rural District: Howmeh

Population (2006)
  - Total: 7
- Time zone: UTC+3:30 (IRST)
  - Summer (DST): UTC+4:30 (IRDT)

Galleh Khar (Persian: گله خر, also Romanized as Gallehkhar) is a village in Howmeh Rural District, in the Central District of Behbahan County, Khuzestan Province, Iran. At the 2006 census, its population was 7, in 5 families.
