= Qaland =

Qaland or Qalend or Kaland (Persian: گبير) may refer to:

- Qaland-e Olya
- Qaland-e Sofla
- Qaland-e Vosta
