= Veysi, Behbahan =

Village in Khuzestan province, Iran

Veysi Persian: ویسی
- Village
- Location within Iran
- Coordinates: 30°45′46″N 50°10′13″E
- Country: Iran
- Province: Khuzestan
- County: Behbahan
- District: Tashan
- Rural District: Tashan-e Sharqi

Population (2016)
  - Total: 854
- Time zone: UTC+3:30 (IRST)

Veysi (Persian: ویسی) (Note: Also romanized as Veysī; also known as Gol-e Zard-e Veysī and Veysīl-e Golzardī) is a village in Tashan-e Sharqi Rural District (Note: Formerly Tashan Rural District) of Tashan District, Behbahan County, Khuzestan province, Iran.

== Demographics ==
=== Population ===
At the time of the 2006 National Census, the village's population was 1,032 in 218 households. The following census in 2011 counted 978 people in 240 households. The 2016 census measured the population of the village as 854 people in 221 households. It was the most populous village in its rural district.
