= Darreh Ney-ye Olya =

Darreh Ney-ye Olya دره ني عليا
- Village
- Location within Iran
- Coordinates: 30°45′18″N 50°01′28″E
- Country: Iran
- Province: Khuzestan
- County: Behbahan
- Bakhsh: Tashan
- Rural District: Tashan-e Gharbi

Population (2006)
  - Total: 105
- Time zone: UTC+3:30 (IRST)
  - Summer (DST): UTC+4:30 (IRDT)

Darreh Ney-ye Olya (Persian: دره ني عليا, also Romanized as Darreh Ney-ye 'Olyā and Darreh Ney-e 'Olyā; also known as Darreh Ney-ye Bālā) is a village in Tashan-e Gharbi Rural District, Tashan District, Behbahan County, Khuzestan province, Iran. At the 2006 census, its population was 105, in 13 families.
