= Korreh Siah-e Talkh =

Korreh Siah-e Talkh كره سياه تلخ
- Village
- Location within Iran
- Coordinates: 30°41′10″N 50°08′23″E
- Country: Iran
- Province: Khuzestan
- County: Behbahan
- Bakhsh: Central
- Rural District: Dodangeh

Population (2006)
  - Total: 313
- Time zone: UTC+3:30 (IRST)
  - Summer (DST): UTC+4:30 (IRDT)

Korreh Siah-e Talkh (Persian: كره سياه تلخ, also Romanized as Korreh Sīāh-e Talkh, Korreh Sīāh Talkh, and Koreh Sīāh-e Talkh; also known as Koreh Sīāh, Korreh Seyāh, Korreh Sīāh, and Korreh Sīyāh) is a village in Dodangeh Rural District, in the Central District of Behbahan County, Khuzestan Province, Iran. At the 2006 census, its population was 313, in 57 families.
