= Yusefi =

Yusefi یوسفی
- Village
- Location within Iran
- Coordinates: 30°47′39″N 50°12′30″E
- Country: Iran
- Province: Khuzestan
- County: Behbahan
- Bakhsh: Tashan
- Rural District: Tashan-e Sharqi

Population (2006)
  - Total: 205
- Time zone: UTC+3:30 (IRST)
  - Summer (DST): UTC+4:30 (IRDT)

Yusefi (Persian: یوسفی, also Romanized as Yūsefī) is a village in Tashan-e Sharqi Rural District, Tashan District, Behbahan County, Khuzestan Province, Iran. At the 2006 census, its population was 205, in 47 families.
