= Bid Boland, Khuzestan =

Bid Boland بيدبلند
- Village
- Location within Iran
- Coordinates: 30°41′00″N 49°59′00″E
- Country: Iran
- Province: Khuzestan
- County: Behbahan
- Bakhsh: Tashan
- Rural District: Tashan-e Gharbi

Population (2006)
  - Total: 517
- Time zone: UTC+3:30 (IRST)
  - Summer (DST): UTC+4:30 (IRDT)

Bid Boland (Persian: بيدبلند, also Romanized as Bīd Boland; also known as Beed Bolin) is a small village in Tashan-e Gharbi Rural District, Tashan District, Behbahan County, Khuzestan Province, Iran. At the 2006 census, its population was 517, in 96 families. Bid Boland is the site of a major refinery and natural gas distribution centre.
