= Qanbari =

Qanbari (Persian: قنبري) may refer to:

- Qanbari, Bushehr
- qanbari, kermanshah
- Qanbari, Fars
- Qanbari, Kerman
- Qanbari, Khuzestan
