= Qanbari, Khuzestan =

Qanbari قنبري
- Village
- Location within Iran
- Coordinates: 30°43′08″N 50°11′28″E
- Country: Iran
- Province: Khuzestan
- County: Behbahan
- Bakhsh: Central
- Rural District: Dodangeh

Population (2006)
  - Total: 628
- Time zone: UTC+3:30 (IRST)
  - Summer (DST): UTC+4:30 (IRDT)

Qanbari (Persian: قنبري, also Romanized as Qanbarī) is a village in Dodangeh Rural District, in the Central District of Behbahan County, Khuzestan Province, Iran. At the 2006 census, its population was 628, in 136 families.
