= Dodangeh-ye Bozorg =

Village in Khuzestan province, Iran

Dodangeh-ye Bozorg Persian: دودانگه بزرگ
- Village
- Location within Iran
- Coordinates: 30°42′45″N 50°11′12″E
- Country: Iran
- Province: Khuzestan
- County: Behbahan
- District: Central
- Rural District: Dodangeh

Population (2016)
  - Total: 1,310
- Time zone: UTC+3:30 (IRST)

Dodangeh-ye Bozorg (Persian: دودانگه بزرگ) (Note: Also romanized as Do Dāngeh Bozorg, Do Dāngeh-ye Bozorg, Dodāngeh-ye Bozorg, and Dow Dāngeh-ye Bozorg) is a village in, and the capital of, Dodangeh Rural District of the Central District of Behbahan County, Khuzestan province, Iran.

== Demographics ==
=== Population ===
At the time of the 2006 National Census, the village's population was 1,308 in 274 households. The following census in 2011 counted 1,342 people in 345 households. The 2016 census measured the population of the village as 1,310 people in 362 households.
