= Garmez Castle =

Castle in Khuzestan Province, Iran

Kuran castle
- قلعه گرمز

General information
- Type: Castle
- Location: Behbahan County, Iran

Kuran castle (Persian: قلعه گرمز) is a historical castle located in Behbahan County in Khuzestan Province, The longevity of this fortress dates back to the Sasanian Empire.
