= Kaland =

Kaland may refer to:

== People ==
- Ad Kaland (1922–1995), Dutch politician of the Christian Historical Union and Christian Democratic Appeal
- Laila Kaland (1939–2007), Norwegian politician for the Labour Party
- Mats André Kaland (born 1989), Norwegian footballer

== Places ==
- Kaland, Austrheim, a village in Austrheim municipality, Vestland county, Norway
- Kaland, Bergen, a village in Bergen municipality, Vestland county, Norway
- Kaland, India, a village in Meerut district, India
- Kalanti (or spelled Kaland in Swedish) is a former municipality in Finland

== Other ==
- Kaland (translated as "Adventure"), a 2011 Hungarian film

== See also ==
- Qaland (disambiguation), an alternate spelling of Kaland
