= Heyatabad =

Heyatabad (Persian: هيئت آباد) may refer to:

- Heyatabad, Hormozgan
- Heyatabad, Divandarreh, Kurdistan Province
- Heyatabad, Kamyaran, Kurdistan Province
