= Darreh Pahn =

Darreh Pahn or Darrehpahn (Persian: دره پهن) may refer to:

- Darreh Pahn, Hormozgan
- Darreh Pahn, Khuzestan
