= Mahtabi Castle =

Castle in Khuzestan Province, Iran

Mahtabi castle
- دژ مهتابی

General information
- Type: Castle
- Location: Behbahan County, Iran

Mahtabi castle (Persian: دژ مهتابی) is a historical castle located in Behbahan County in Khuzestan Province, The longevity of this fortress dates back to the Sasanian Empire.
