= Kordestan-e Bozorg =

Village in Khuzestan province, Iran

Kordestan-e Bozorg Persian: كردستان بزرگ
- Village
- Location within Iran
- Coordinates: 30°40′13″N 50°11′35″E
- Country: Iran
- Province: Khuzestan
- County: Behbahan
- District: Central
- Rural District: Dodangeh

Population (2016)
  - Total: 2,278
- Time zone: UTC+3:30 (IRST)

Kordestan-e Bozorg (Persian: كردستان بزرگ) (Note: Also romanized as Kordestān-e Bozorg; also known as Kordestān-e Pā’īn, Kordestān Soflá, and Kordestān-e Soflá) is a village in Dodangeh Rural District of the Central District of Behbahan County, Khuzestan province, Iran.

== Demographics ==
=== Population ===
At the time of the 2006 National Census, the village's population was 2,219 in 399 households. The following census in 2011 counted 2,315 people in 576 households. The 2016 census measured the population of the village as 2,278 people in 615 households. It was the most populous village in its rural district.
