= Heyatabad, Kamyaran =

Heyatabad هيئت آباد
- Village
- Location within Iran
- Coordinates: 34°47′40″N 46°52′36″E
- Country: Iran
- Province: Kurdistan
- County: Kamyaran
- Bakhsh: Central
- Rural District: Shahu

Population (2006)
  - Total: 62
- Time zone: UTC+3:30 (IRST)
  - Summer (DST): UTC+4:30 (IRDT)

Heyatabad (Persian: هيئت آباد, also Romanized as Hey‘atābād and Hey'atābād) is a village in Shahu Rural District, in the Central District of Kamyaran County, Kurdistan Province, Iran. At the 2006 census, its population was 62, in 15 families. The village is populated by Kurds.
