= Dodangeh Rural District =

Dodangeh Rural District (Persian: دهستان دودانگه) may refer to:

- Dodangeh Rural District (Hurand County)
- Dodangeh Rural District (Khuzestan Province)

== See also ==
- Dodangeh-ye Olya Rural District
- Dodangeh-ye Sofla Rural District
