= Meydaneh =

Meydaneh ميدانه
- Village
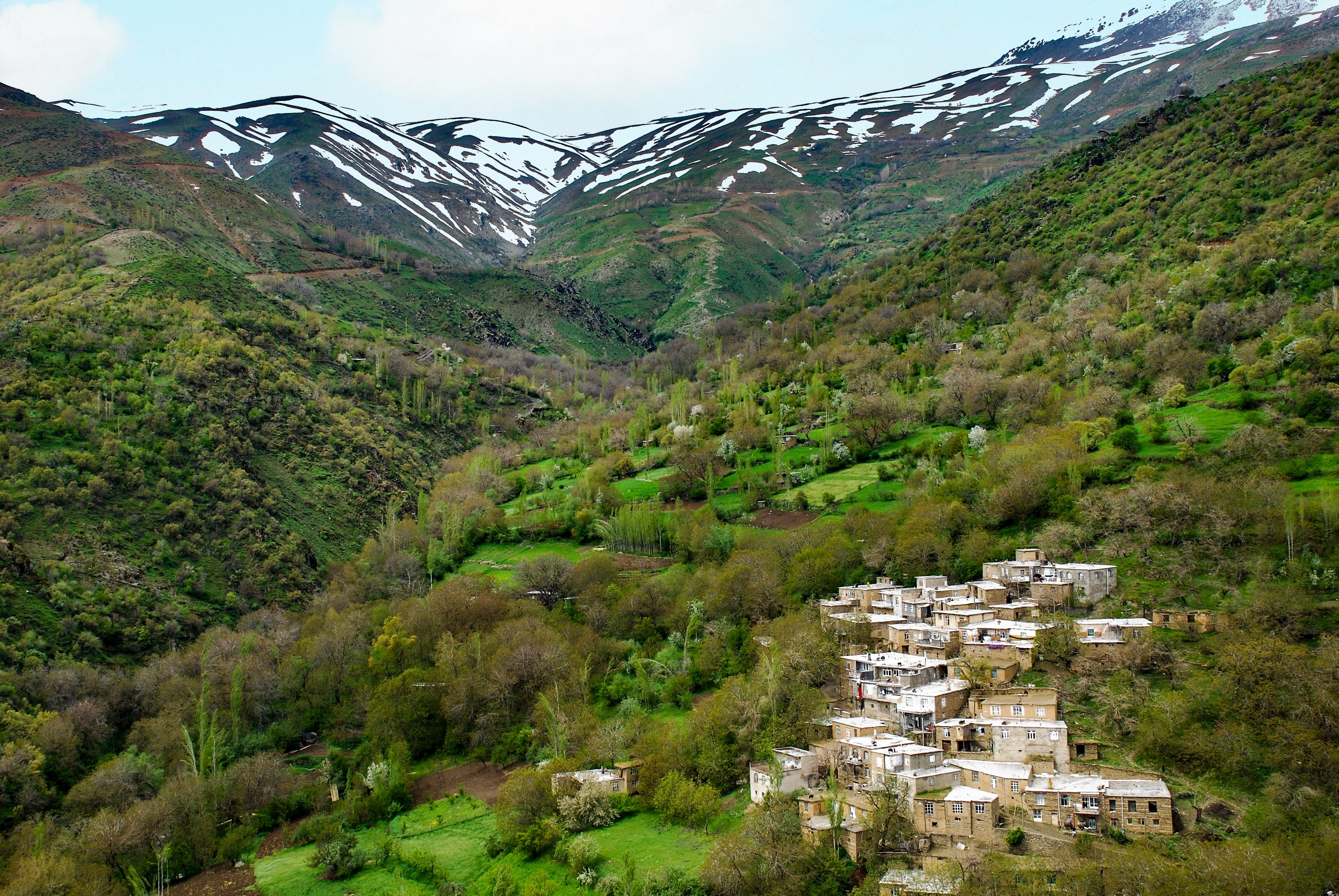

- Location within Iran
- Coordinates: 34°55′07″N 47°02′05″E
- Country: Iran
- Province: Kurdistan
- County: Kamyaran
- Bakhsh: Muchesh
- Rural District: Sursur

Population (2006)
  - Total: 64
- Time zone: UTC+3:30 (IRST)

Meydaneh (Persian: ميدانه, also Romanized as Meydāneh; Kurdish: میانە / Miyane) is a village in Sursur Rural District, Muchesh District, Kamyaran County, Kurdistan Province, Iran. At the 2006 census, its population was 64, in 18 families. The village is populated by Kurds.
