= Tashan, Khuzestan =

City in Khuzestan province, Iran

Tashan Persian: تشان
- City
- Location within Iran
- Coordinates: 30°49′45″N 50°12′05″E
- Country: Iran
- Province: Khuzestan
- County: Behbahan
- District: Tashan

Population (2016)
  - Total: 4,281
- Time zone: UTC+3:30 (IRST)

Tashan (Persian: تشان) (Note: Also romanized as Teshān; formerly the village of Mashhad (مشهد)) is a city in, and the capital of, Tashan District of Behbahan County, Khuzestan province, Iran. It also serves as the administrative center for Tashan-e Sharqi Rural District. (Note: Formerly Tashan Rural District)

== Demographics ==
=== Population ===
At the time of the 2006 National Census, the population was 461 in 93 households, when it was in Tashan-e Sharqi Rural District. The following census in 2011 counted 471 people in 121 households. The 2016 census measured the population as 4,281 people in 1,159 households, by which time Mashhad had merged with the villages of Ablesh, Chahardahi-ye Asgar, Chahardahi-ye Sohrab, Deh-e Ebrahim, Kalgeh Zar, Masiri, Sarallah, Shahrak-e Taleqani, and Tall Kohneh to form the city of Tashan.
