= Mansuriyeh, Khuzestan =

City in Khuzestan province, Iran

Mansuriyeh Persian: منصوريه
- City
- Location within Iran
- Coordinates: 30°37′41″N 50°18′05″E
- Country: Iran
- Province: Khuzestan
- County: Behbahan
- District: Central

Population (2016)
  - Total: 5,441
- Time zone: UTC+3:30 (IRST)

Mansuriyeh (Persian: منصوريه) (Note: Also romanized as Manşūrīyeh; also known as Mansūrābād) is a city in the Central District of Behbahan County, Khuzestan province, Iran, serving as the administrative center for Howmeh Rural District.

== Demographics ==
=== Population ===
At the time of the 2006 National Census, Mansuriyeh's population was 5,226 in 1,149 households, when it was a village in Howmeh Rural District. The following census in 2011 counted 5,510 people in 1,467 households. The 2016 census measured the population as 5,441 people in 1,528 households, by which time the village had been elevated to the status of a city.
