= Qanbari, Kerman =

Qanbari قنبري
- Village
- Location within Iran
- Coordinates: 28°50′00″N 56°16′00″E
- Country: Iran
- Province: Kerman
- County: Baft
- Bakhsh: Central
- Rural District: Khabar

Population (2006)
  - Total: 66
- Time zone: UTC+3:30 (IRST)
  - Summer (DST): UTC+4:30 (IRDT)

Qanbari (Persian: قنبري, also Romanized as Qanbarī) is a village in Khabar Rural District, in the Central District of Baft County, Kerman Province, Iran. At the 2006 census, its population was 66, in 16 families, with an average persons per family count of 4.125.
