= Bajk, Hormozgan =

Bajk بجك
- Village
- Location within Iran
- Coordinates: 27°40′35″N 57°06′22″E
- Country: Iran
- Province: Hormozgan
- County: Rudan
- Bakhsh: Central
- Rural District: Rahdar

Population (2006)
  - Total: 122
- Time zone: UTC+3:30 (IRST)
  - Summer (DST): UTC+4:30 (IRDT)

Bajk (Persian: بجك; also known as Bajg) is a village in Rahdar Rural District, in the Central District of Rudan County, Hormozgan Province, Iran. At the 2006 census, its population was 122, in 24 families.
