= Galeh Khar, West Azerbaijan =

Galeh Khar گله خر
- Village
- Location within Iran
- Coordinates: 37°57′02″N 44°43′26″E
- Country: Iran
- Province: West Azerbaijan
- County: Urmia
- Bakhsh: Sumay-ye Beradust
- Rural District: Sumay-ye Shomali

Population (2006)
  - Total: 175
- Time zone: UTC+3:30 (IRST)
  - Summer (DST): UTC+4:30 (IRDT)

Galeh Khar (Persian: گله خر, also Romanized as Galleh Khar) is a village in Sumay-ye Shomali Rural District, Sumay-ye Beradust District, Urmia County, West Azerbaijan Province, Iran. At the 2006 census, its population was 175, in 35 families.
