= Bid Boland, Bushehr =

Bid Boland بيدبلند
- Village
- Location within Iran
- Coordinates: 27°50′57″N 52°18′30″E
- Country: Iran
- Province: Bushehr
- County: Jam
- Bakhsh: Central
- Rural District: Jam

Population (2006)
  - Total: 58
- Time zone: UTC+3:30 (IRST)

Bid Boland (Persian: بيدبلند, also Romanized as Bīd Boland and Bīd-e Boland; also known as Burj Bīdu Buland) is a village in Jam Rural District, in the Central District of Jam County, Bushehr Province, Iran. At the 2006 census, its population was 58, in 9 families.
