= Darreh Ney, Kohgiluyeh and Boyer-Ahmad =

Darreh Ney دره ني
- Village
- Location within Iran
- Coordinates: 30°57′56″N 50°37′48″E
- Country: Iran
- Province: Kohgiluyeh and Boyer-Ahmad
- County: Kohgiluyeh
- Bakhsh: Central
- Rural District: Doshman Ziari

Population (2006)
  - Total: 41
- Time zone: UTC+3:30 (IRST)
  - Summer (DST): UTC+4:30 (IRDT)

Darreh Ney (Persian: دره ني) is a village in Doshman Ziari Rural District, in the Central District of Kohgiluyeh County, Kohgiluyeh and Boyer-Ahmad Province, Iran. In the 2006 census, its population was 41, from 10 families.
