= Kurdistan province =

Province of Iran

Kurdistan province: استان کردستان (Persian); پارێزگای کوردستان (Kurdish)
- Province
- استان کردستان
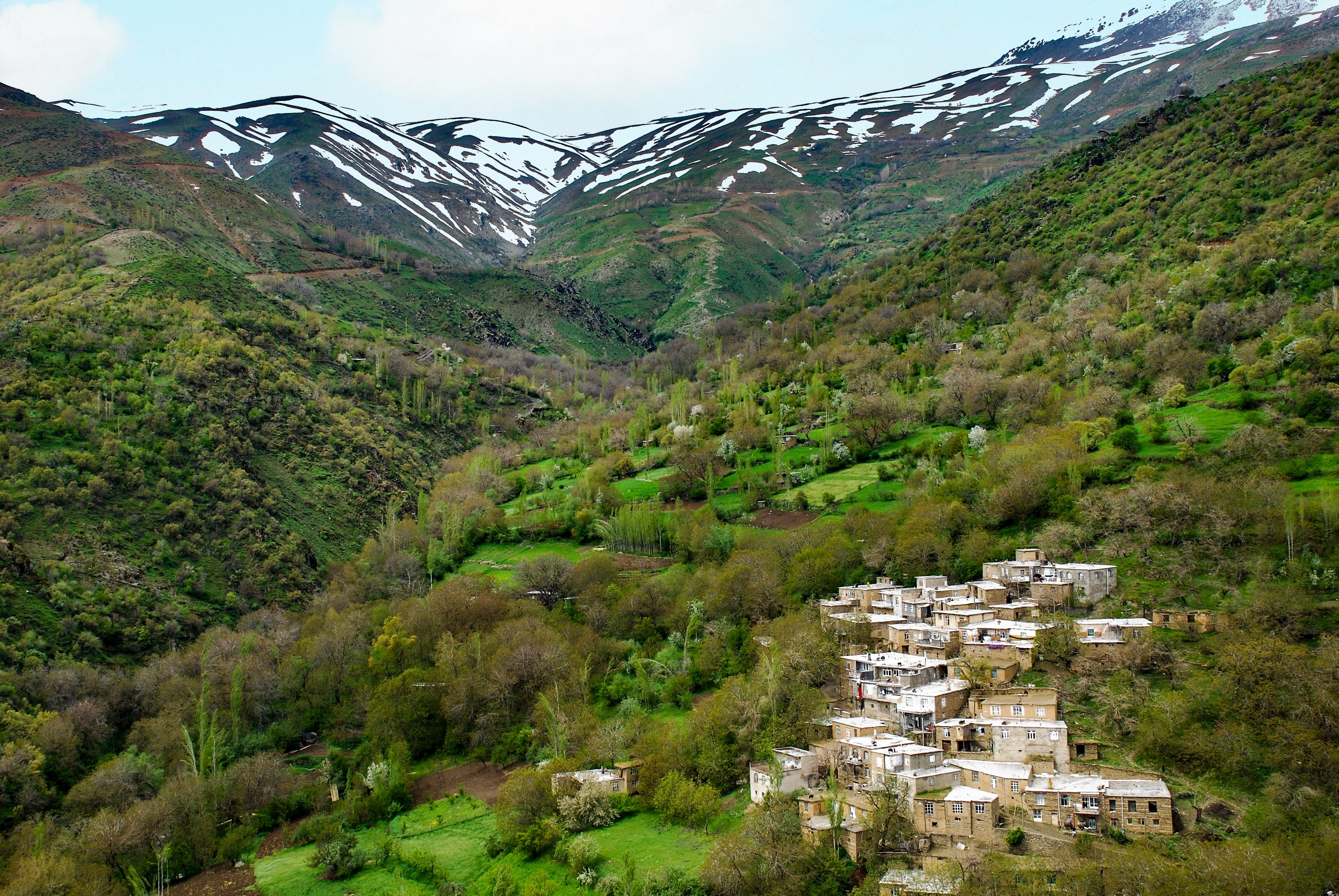
- Miyane village

- Location of Kurdistan Province within Iran
- Coordinates: 35°35′N 46°53′E
- Country: Iran
- Region: Region 3
- Capital: Sanandaj
- Counties: 10

Government
  - Governor-general: Arash Zarehtan Lahoni (Reformist)

Area
  - Total: 29,137 km^{2} (11,250 sq mi)

Population (2015)
  - Total: 1,603,011
  - Density: 55.016/km^{2} (142.49/sq mi)
- Time zone: UTC+03:30 (IRST)
- ISO 3166 code: IR-12
- Main language(s): Persian (official) local languages: Ardalan languages Kurdish
- HDI (2017): 0.743 high · 30th

Kurdistan province (Persian: استان کردستان Ostān-e Kordestān) is one of 31 provinces of Iran. The province is 28,817 km^{2} (11,126 sq mi) in area and its capital is the city of Sanandaj.

Kurdistan province is located in the west of Iran, in Region 3. It borders the Kurdistan region of Iraq to the west, and the Iranian provinces of West Azerbaijan to the north, Zanjan to the northeast, Hamadan to the east, and Kermanshah to the south. It forms part of the area unofficially known as Iranian Kurdistan.

== History ==
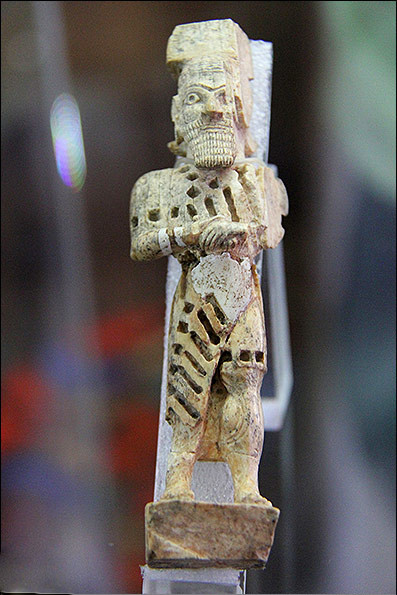
A soldier statue from Ziwiye hoard

The earliest human occupation of Kurdistan dates back to the Paleolithic Period when Neanderthals lived in the Sirwan Valley of Kurdistan more than 40,000 years ago.

== Demographics ==
=== Language and ethnicity ===
Whilst most of the people of this province speak Kurdish, other languages such as Azerbaijani and Persian are also common.

Iranian Kurds make up the majority of the population, but Iranian Azeris populate the eastern provincial borderlands. Most of the Kurdish population speak Sorani Kurdish, but Southern Kurdish is spoken in the eastern parts of the province, including in Bijar and Dezej, while Gorani is the main language in many villages in the southwestern part of the province. Oghuz Turkic varieties can be found in the far-eastern part of the province, including in the cities of Delbaran, Pir Taj, Serishabad, Yasukand, and Tup Aghaj. These varieties are described as distinct from Iranian Azerbaijani, although they are closely related to it. While not being the primary language in any settlement in the province, Persian is increasingly becoming the first language, especially among the population in the eastern parts of the province.

=== Religion ===
A significant majority of the people of Kurdistan province follow the Sunni denomination of Islam. A minority of Shia, Yarsanism and Christian followers also live in this province.

=== Population ===
At the time of the 2006 National Census, the province's population was 1,416,334 inhabitants in 337,179 households. The following census in 2011 counted 1,493,645 living in 401,845 households. The 2016 census measured the population of the province as 2,152,471 in 471,310 households.

=== Administrative divisions ===

The population history and structural changes of Kurdistan province's administrative divisions over three consecutive censuses are shown in the following table. Each county is named after the city that serves as its administrative capital.

Kurdistan province
Counties	2006	2011	2016
Baneh	116,773	132,565	158,690
Bijar	95,461	93,714	89,162
Dehgolan (Note: Separated from Ghorveh County after the 2006 census)	—	62,844	64,015
Divandarreh	82,628	81,963	80,040
Ghorveh	196,972	136,961	140,192
Kamyaran	104,704	105,996	102,856
Marivan	150,926	168,774	195,263
Sanandaj	409,628	450,167	501,402
Saqqez	205,250	210,820	226,451
Sarvabad	53,992	49,841	44,940
Total	1,416,334	1,493,645	1,603,011

=== Cities ===
According to the 2016 census, 1,134,229 people (over 70% of the population of Kurdistan province) live in the following cities:

City	Population
Armardeh	2,305
Babarashani	509
Baneh	110,218
Bardeh Rasheh	1,020
Bijar	50,014
Bolbanabad	3,193
Buin-e Sofla	1,518
Chenareh	455
Dehgolan	25,992
Delbaran	6,713
Dezej	2,219
Divandarreh	34,007
Ghorveh	78,276
Kamyaran	57,077
Kani Dinar	13,059
Kani Sur	1,284
Marivan	136,654
Muchesh	3,370
Pir Taj	1,199
Saheb	3,101
Sanandaj	412,767
Saqqez	165,258
Sarvabad	5,121
Serishabad	7,196
Shuyesheh	1,302
Tup Aghaj	1,645
Uraman Takht	3,176
Yasukand	3,490
Zarrineh	2,091

=== Most populous cities ===
The following sorted table lists the most populous cities in Kurdistan in 2016.

Rank	City	County	Population
1	Sanandaj	Sanandaj	412,767
2	Saqqez	Saqqez	165,258
3	Marivan	Marivan	136,654
4	Baneh	Baneh	110,218
5	Qorveh	Qorveh	78,276
6	Kamyaran	Kamyaran	57,077
7	Bijar	Bijar	50,014
8	Divandarreh	Divandarreh	34,007
9	Dehgolan	Dehgolan	25,992
10	Kani Dinar	Marivan	13,059

== Culture ==
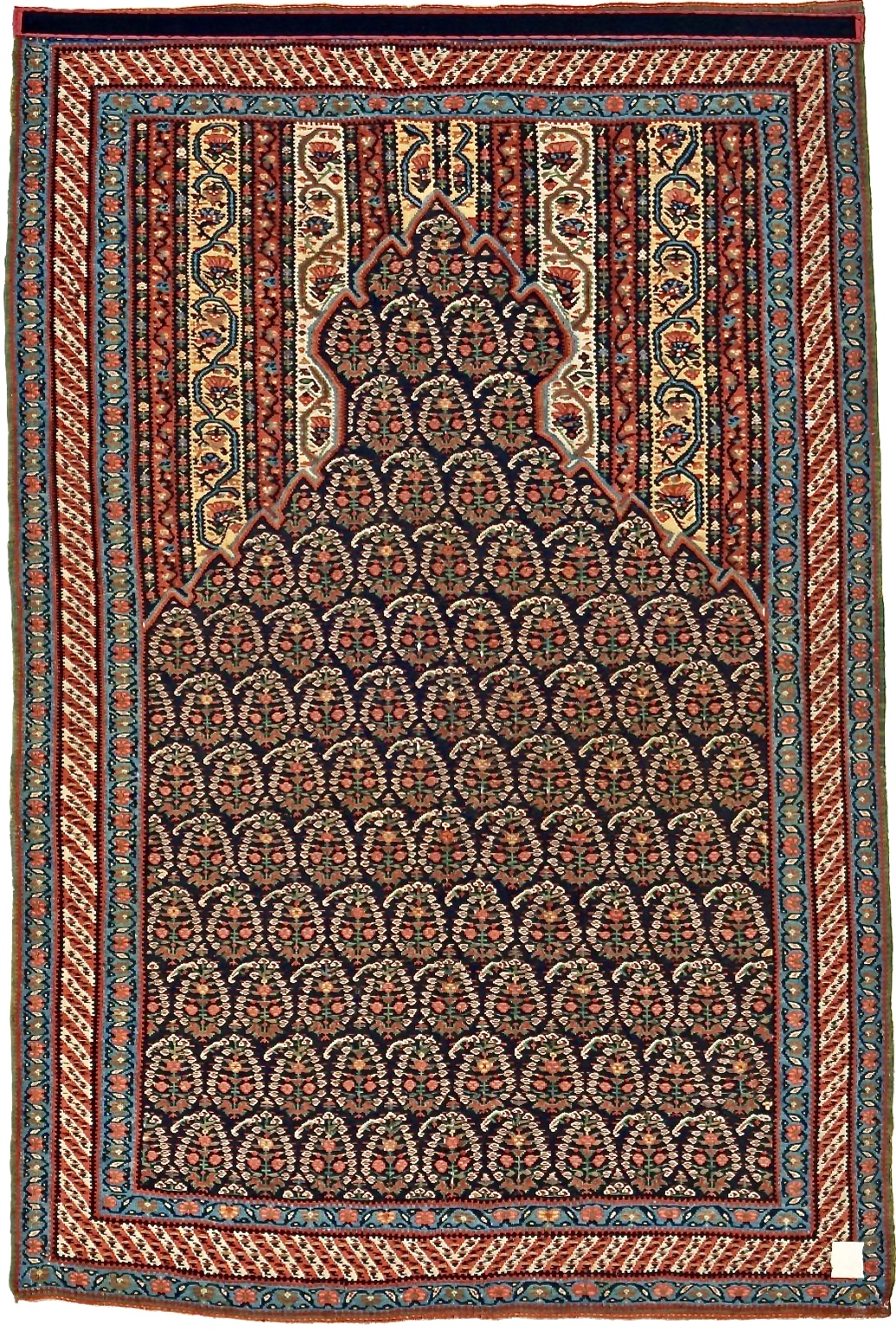
A fine old Senneh prayer kilim from the 19th century

=== Clothing ===
The people of this province have special clothes that they have been wearing for centuries. The important point about the clothes of the people of this province is that even after the spread of modernism all over the world, the people of this province still try to be faithful to their past traditions in the field of lifestyle.

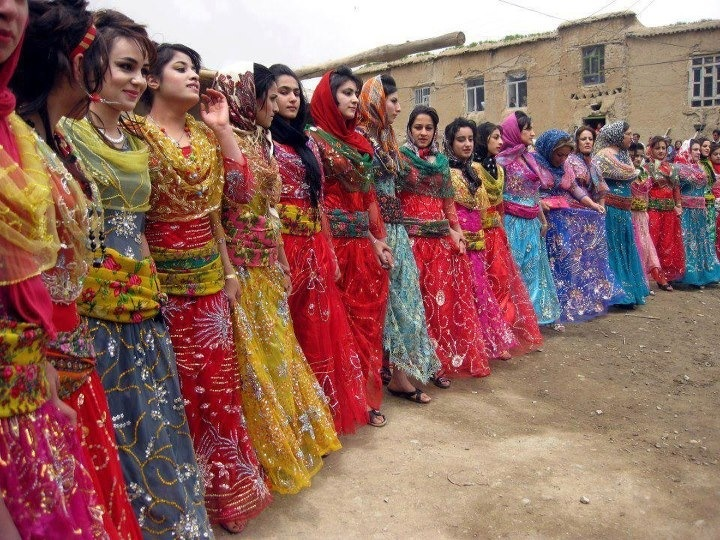
Traditional women's clothing used in all parts of Kurdistan

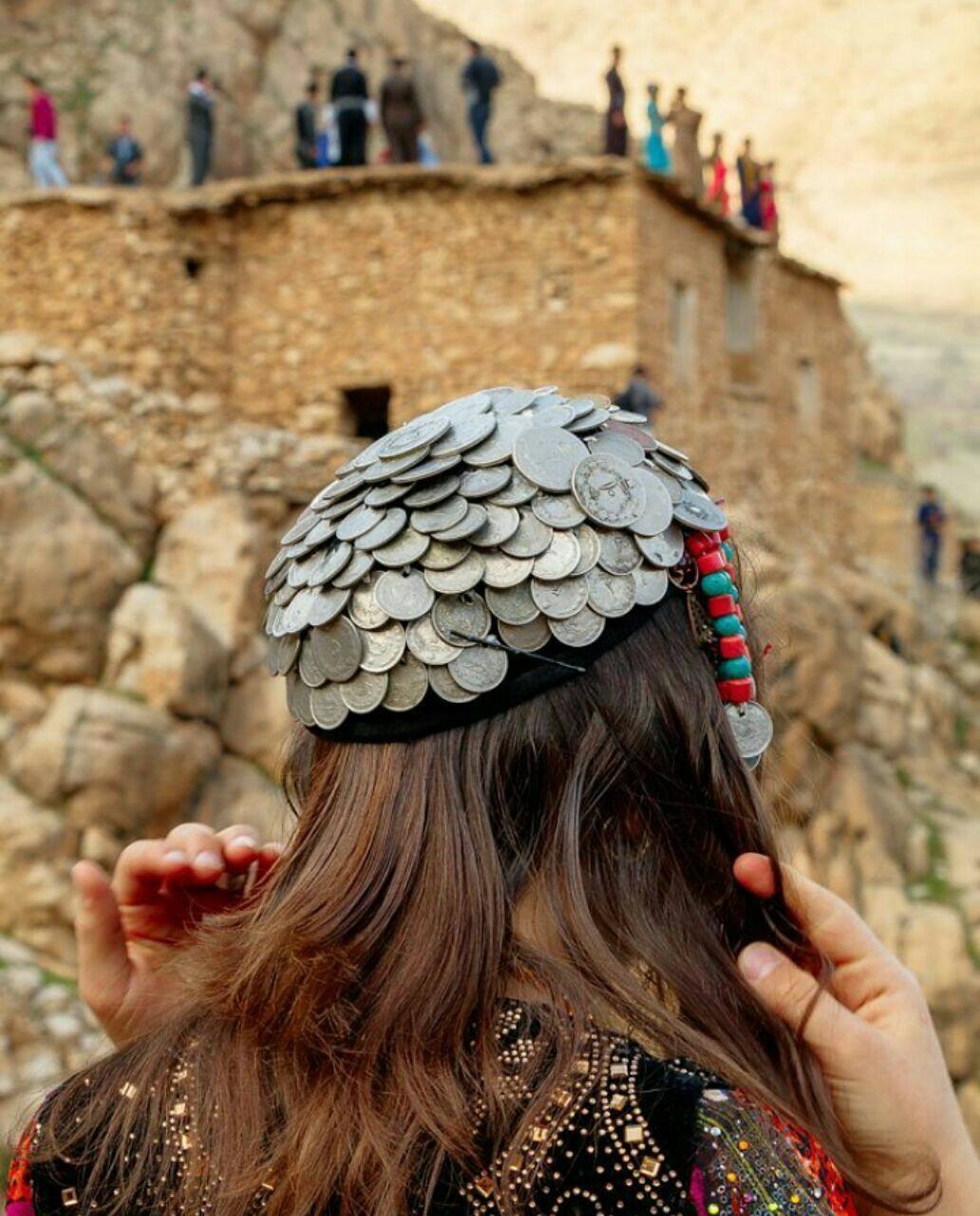
Hawraman female with traditional headdress decorated by coins

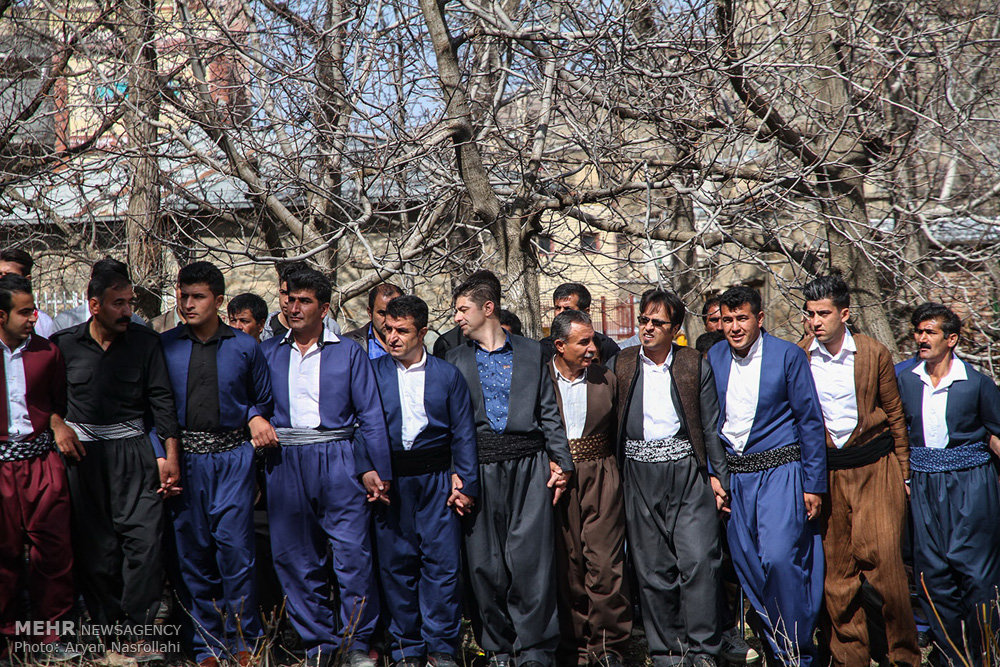
Kurdistan men's clothing

=== Dance and music ===
Among the cultural symbols of Kurdistan people are Kurdish dance and singing. This cultural tradition is very popular not only in this province but also throughout the country.

=== Important annual celebrations ===
==== Chaharshanbeh Suri ====
Chaharshanbeh Suri or Charshanbeh Suri is an Iranian festival of the fire dance celebrated on the eve of the last Wednesday of the year, of ancient Zoroastrian origin. It is the first festivity of Nowruz, the Iranian New Year. In this celebration, people light fires on the mountains and on the roofs of houses, dance, and rejoice.

==== Nowruz ====
Nowruz is one of the most important ceremonies that has been celebrated by Iranians for millennia. Nowruz and related ceremonies are celebrated in the most opulent way possible in Kurdistan province. As the spring equinox, Nowruz marks the beginning of spring in the Northern Hemisphere, better i.e. the moment at which the Sun crosses the celestial equator and equalizes night and day is calculated exactly every year. Traditional customs of Nowruz include fire and water, ritual dances, gift exchanges, reciting poetry, symbolic objects and more.

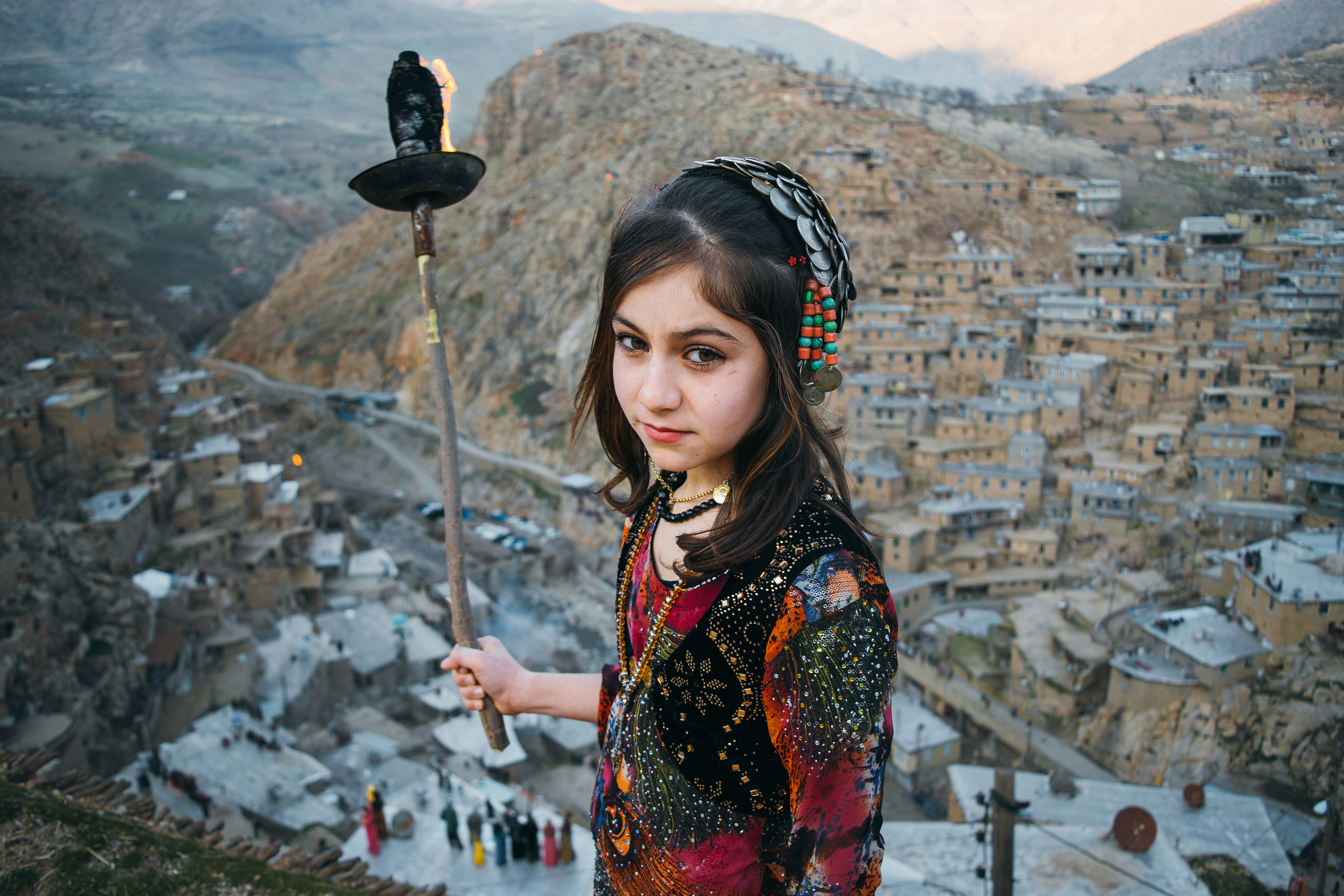
A Kurdish girl lighting a fire during Nowruz

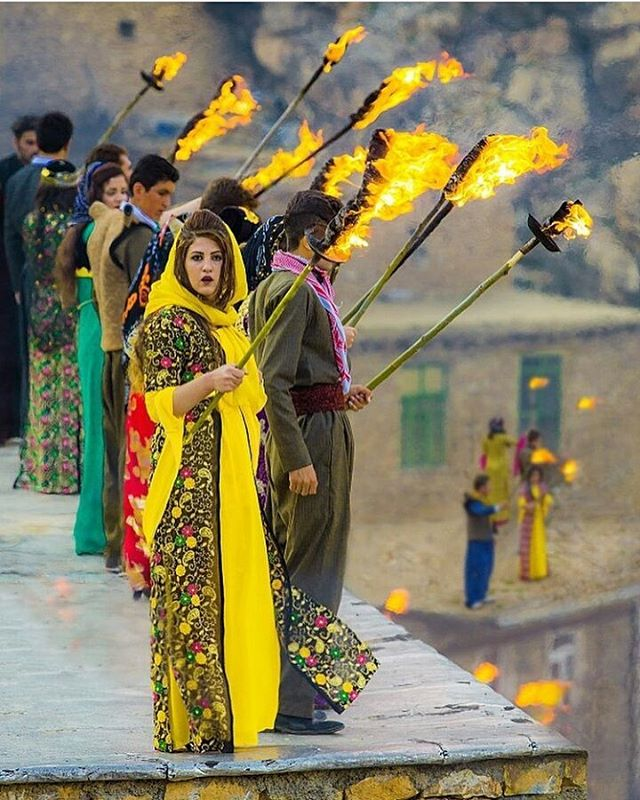
Kurdish New Year ceremony of Nowruz, Palangan village, Hawraman, Kurdistan

== Economy ==
The major activities of the inhabitants are agriculture and modern livestock farming. Wheat, barley, grains and fruits are the major agricultural products. The chemical, metal, textile, leather and food industries are the main industrial activities in this province. This province has one of the largest rates of unemployment in Iran. According to Iranian statistics, more than twenty thousand people depend on being a kolbar for sustenance.

== Colleges and universities ==
- Kurdistan University of Medical Sciences
  - Tohid Medical Center
- University of Kurdistan
- Islamic Azad University, Sanandaj Branch

== See also ==
- Hajar Khatoon Mosque
- Iranian Kurdistan
- Kurdistan
- Kurdistan (disambiguation)
- Uramanat Villages

== Bibliography ==
- Ahmady, Kameel; et al. (2023). From Border to Border: Comprehensive Research Study on Identity and Ethnicity in Iran (PDF). Moldova: Scholars' Press publishes. ISBN 9786206769538.
- Houtsma, Martijn Theodoor (1993). First Encyclopaedia of Islam, 1913–1936. Vol. 4 (1st ed.). Leiden, Netherlands: BRILL. p. 1140. ISBN 90-04-09790-2. OCLC 258059134.
- Maisel, Sebastian (21 June 2018). The Kurds. Santa Barbara, California; Denver, Colorado: Bloomsbury Publishing USA. p. 236. ISBN 978-1-4408-4257-3.
