= Mohammed Nabi Yusufi =

Mohammed Nabi Yusufi (1923–2005) was an Imam of the Afghan community in New York City.

== In Afghanistan ==
Mohammed Nabi Yusufi was born in Kandahar, Afghanistan on 10 March 1923 to an ethnic Pashtun and Akhounzada Khail family. Yusufi had an export business in Afghanistan; he had homes both in the capital Kabul and his home town of Kandahar. He fled Afghanistan with his family shortly after the Russians invaded Afghanistan in 1979.

Yusufi held a post in King Zahir Shah's government as an emir and was elected as the president of the Kandahar chamber of commerce, as well the mayor of Zabol.

He spoke Pashto, Dari, Arabic, Urdu, and English.

== Response to Russian invasion ==
Yusufi led groups to the United Nations to raise awareness about the Russian invasion into Afghanistan and to bring attention to the thousands of innocent Afghans that were being killed by the Soviet Union in the early 1980s. In 1985 Yusufi was asked to be the spiritual and community leader by several Afghans residing in New York City as the settlement of Afghans in the area was increasing and they had no center for religious and cultural services. He was the Imam of the Masjid e Syed Jamaluddin e Afghani in Queens, New York which doubles as a community center.

== Illness and death ==
On November 8, 2005, Yusufi had a heart attack. He died on November 28, 2005, from pulmonary edema as a result.
