= Ab Kharzahreh, Andika =

Ab Khar Zahreh اب خرزهره
- Village
- Location within Iran
- Coordinates: 32°14′05″N 49°36′17″E
- Country: Iran
- Province: Khuzestan
- County: Andika
- Bakhsh: Central
- Rural District: Shalal and Dasht-e Gol

Population (2006)
  - Total: 241
- Time zone: UTC+3:30 (IRST)
  - Summer (DST): UTC+4:30 (IRDT)

Ab Khar Zahreh (Persian: اب خرزهره, also Romanized as Āb Khar Zahreh) is a village in Shalal and Dasht-e Gol Rural District, in the Central District of Andika County, Khuzestan Province, Iran. At the 2006 census, its population was 241, in 40 families.
