= Mashhadi Hoseyn =

Mashhadi Hoseyn مشهدي حسين
- Village
- Location within Iran
- Coordinates: 33°48′00″N 48°16′00″E
- Country: Iran
- Province: Lorestan
- County: Selseleh
- Bakhsh: Central
- Rural District: Honam

Population (2006)
  - Total: 35
- Time zone: UTC+3:30 (IRST)
  - Summer (DST): UTC+4:30 (IRDT)

Mashhadi Hoseyn (Persian: مشهدي حسين, also Romanized as Mashhadī Ḩoseyn; also known as Mīrzāābād) is a village in Honam Rural District, in the Central District of Selseleh County, Lorestan Province, Iran. At the 2006 census, its population was 35, in 7 families.
