= Shah Nazari, Kerman =

Shah Nazari شاه نظري
- Village
- Location within Iran
- Coordinates: 29°09′45″N 57°23′04″E
- Country: Iran
- Province: Kerman
- County: Jiroft
- Bakhsh: Sarduiyeh
- Rural District: Sarduiyeh

Population (2006)
  - Total: 29
- Time zone: UTC+3:30 (IRST)
  - Summer (DST): UTC+4:30 (IRDT)

Shah Nazari (Persian: شاه نظري, also Romanized as Shāh Nāz̧arī) is a village in Sarduiyeh Rural District, Sarduiyeh District, Jiroft County, Kerman Province, Iran. At the 2006 census, its population was 29, in 8 families.
