= Yousefi =

Origin
- Meaning: "son of Joseph"
- Region of origin: Iran Ushaiger Uyun Aljiwa

Yousefi (Persian: یوسفی) is a Persian patronymic surname, meaning "son of Joseph". It is rare as a given name. The surname Yousefi is predominantly found in Iran, indicating its origin in that region. It is believed to have derived from a historical context when Persians referred to Jewish individuals as 'Yousefi,' which could be the reason why it became a family name.

== People ==
- Amir Hossein Yousefi, Iranian footballer
- Ershad Yousefi, Iranian footballer
- Mohsen Yousefi (footballer, born 1984), Iranian footballer
- Mohsen Yousefi (footballer, born 1954), Iranian footballer
- Yousefi Eshkevari, Iranian cleric
- Radbeh Yousefi
