= MV Kurdistan =

Oil tanker/oil spill

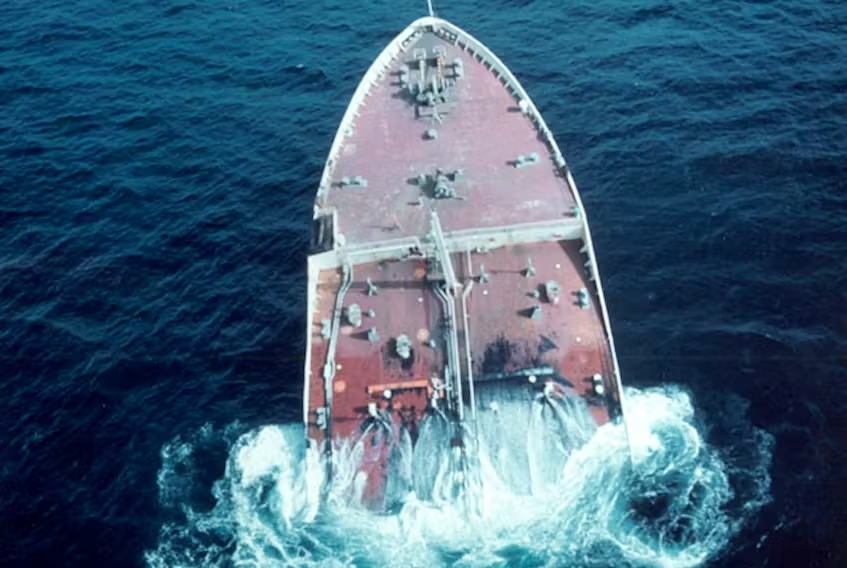
- MV Kurdistan's bow adrift following the wreck

History
- Name: 1973-1976: Frank D. Moores; 1976-1979: Kurdistan; 1979-1980: Simonburn; 1980-1986: Aura Bravery; 1986-2000: Seabravery
- Operator: 1973-1980: Nile Steamship Company; 1980: Hindustan Steam Shipping Company; 1980: Northumbrian Shipping Company; 1982-1986: Ching Tankers; 1986-1987: Seaveil Shipping Group; 1987-2000: Coronation Shipping Group
- Builder: Swan Hunter, Hebburn, United Kingdom
- Yard number: 47
- Launched: 6 February 1973
- Completed: 18 June 1973
- Home port: UK Newcastle upon Tyne (1973–1982); Liberia Monrovia (1982–1986); Cyprus Limassol (1986–1987); Malta Valletta (1987–2000)
- Fate: Scrapped

General characteristics
- Type: Motor tanker
- Tonnage: GRT: 19867; NRT: 11406; DWT: 32531
- Length: OA: 192.0 metres (629.9 ft); LBP: 182.9 metres (600 ft)
- Beam: 27 metres (89 ft)
- Depth: 10.4 feet (3.2 m)
- Propulsion: 1 x 7 Cylinder Barclay Curle diesel-fed engine producing 14000 BHP via one shaft
- Speed: 16 knots
- Notes: Data from initial design. Small changes occurred throughout service

MV Kurdistan, initially named Frank D. Moores, was an oil tanker built in 1973 for the American-Canadian trade. In 1979, she became stuck in ice and suffered a cataphoric structural failure, resulting in her bow shearing off and the spilling of 10,000 tons of oil off Nova Scotia, Canada.

The cause of the accident was blamed on defective welding in her keel. Following the accident, her bow was rebuilt and the ship was sold off under a new name. She was transferred between owners before she was scrapped in 2000.

== Design and construction ==
=== Development ===
In December 1973, the Come by Chance Refinery in Newfoundland began operations, promising to produce 100,000 barrels of oil a day. Anticipating demand from the new refinery, the Nile Steamship Company, itself a subsidiary of Common Brothers, ordered two oil tankers from Swan Hunter shipbuilders at a combined cost of $15 million ($108,789,355 in 2023). The two ships were built to carry jet fuel from the refinery to Boston's Logan International Airport and New York City's John F. Kennedy Airport. The first tanker was named the Joseph R. Smallwood, named after Joseph Smallwood, premier of Newfoundland and Labrador, who was a staunch supporter of the refinery. Her sistership was christened Frank D. Moores, named after Frank Moores, premier when the refinery opened. The Frank D. Moores was launched by the namesake's two daughters in February 1973 and completed in June of the same year.

=== Design ===
As designed, her superstructure, funnel, and engine were located on the stern, joined by a raised forecastle on the bow and an otherwise clear deck. She was rated as Ice Classification One by Lloyd's Register, indicating she could operate without a breaker in icy waters.

The ship's hold was separated into six tanks, which were further divided into a center tank and a wing tank on either side.

A common trend during the 1970s was the use of relatively unstudied high-strength steel in ship construction. It was believed that the stronger steel would be able to resist stress better than the older types of steel, reducing the need for structural redundancies. What was not known at the time was that the stronger steel was as equally vulnerable to fatigue fractures as the normal steel, leading to a rise in structural failures of such vessels built during the decade.

== Early service ==
On 16 July 1975, she collided with the Mount Hope Bridge while traveling to Tiverton, Rhode Island at night in heavy fog. The bridge was severely damaged with the north tower nearly sheared apart, requiring two years of repairs and the jacking of the tower to allow the removal of damaged steel. The damage to the bridge totaled $600,000 ($3,187,809 in 2023). The tanker on the other hand was relatively unaffected, suffering only slight damage to the bow and responsibility for the accident.

Ever since the two ships were under construction, it was planned that the refinery's parent company would operate the duo. As such, the Newfoundland Refining Company was established and chartered both tankers from Nile Steamship for 16 years. However, the Come by Chance Refinery - and Newfoundland Refining - went bankrupt in 1976.

Following the dissolution of her operator, Nile Steamship renamed her to Kurdistan, keeping the ship to operate along the Eastern coast of Canada.

== Oil spill ==
While traveling from Point Tupper, Nova Scotia to Sept-Îles, Quebec on 15 March 1979, laden with 30,000 tons of heated Bunker c oil, Kurdistan encountered heavy winter pack ice in the Cabot Strait around noon and was unable to proceed. The weather was poor and the ship reported that it was rolling heavily. After being immobilized in the ice for approximately eight hours the tanker turned and headed towards the open sea in an effort to get around the pack ice. Almost immediately after clearing the ice, the tanker was caught in a heavy swell and crew reported hearing a "thud and a shudder", and Kurdistan's hull began to crack vertically in two separate areas. Oil began leaking from a vertical crack in the sides of the vessel's No.3 wing tanks. The Kurdistan crew managed to pump a substantial amount of the oil into the remaining undamaged tanks within the vessel, limiting what could have been a more catastrophic spill, before the ship's bow section broke completely apart from the vessel and remained partially afloat. The crew were later rescued by the Canadian Coast Guard vessel Sir William Alexander.

In the disaster, 10,000 tons of heavy oil was ultimately spilled into the Cabot Strait, with the clean-up efforts along Cape Breton Island's western coastline taking ten months to complete. It was later revealed that the disaster marked the first time Kurdistan had ever carried a cargo of heated oil.

The stern section remained afloat and was towed into Port Hastings, Nova Scotia where the remaining 16,000 tonnes of oil was off-loaded once weather had improved. What remained of Kurdistan was later towed to Europe and retrofitted with a new hull before returning to service as the Simonburn in November 1979. The severed bow section was towed to deep water south of Sable Island and sunk by gunfire from HMCS Margaree on 1 April 1979.

=== Cause ===
An inquiry later blamed the wreck on human error, with faulty welding to the ship's hull made shortly before the incident being deemed responsible.

The cause of the crack was determined to be a defective butt weld in the port-side bilge keel. The area had been damaged in 1975 and repaired in 1977. It was also determined that the displacement of heated oil by cold water entering the cargo tanks contributed to the disaster.

== Later service ==
Immediately following the accident, Kurdistan was brought into drydock and fitted with a new bow. While in drydock, she was transferred to the Hindustan Steam Shipping Company, itself managed by Common Brothers. Under her new operators, the ship was renamed Simonburn in 1979. The next year, the ship was transferred to the Northumbrian Shipping Company, also a part of Common Bros. Under her new owners, she was renamed to Aura Bravery.

Her purchase while in drydock left Common Brothers to cover the cost of reconstruction, who financed the move with bank loans in hopes to achieve questionable profits previously forecasted. By 1982, the company had missed the forecasted profits and approached a crisis as its stock rapidly deflated, interest on debt mounted, and began losing money due to failed investments. To inject cash into the failing company, Aura Bravery was sold.
