= Tashan-e Gharbi Rural District =

Rural district in Khuzestan province, Iran

Tashan-e Gharbi Rural District Persian: دهستان تشان غربی
- Rural District
- Location within Iran
- Coordinates: 30°45′42″N 50°03′29″E
- Country: Iran
- Province: Khuzestan
- County: Behbahan
- District: Tashan
- Capital: Ab Amiri

Population (2016)
  - Total: 3,353
- Time zone: UTC+3:30 (IRST)

Tashan-e Gharbi Rural District (Persian: دهستان تشان غربی) is in Tashan District of Behbahan County, Khuzestan province, Iran. Its capital is the village of Ab Amiri.

== Demographics ==
=== Population ===
At the time of the 2006 National Census, the rural district's population was 4,173 in 863 households. There were 4,153 inhabitants in 980 households at the following census of 2011. The 2016 census measured the population of the rural district as 3,353 in 954 households. The most populous of its 40 villages was Ab Amiri, with 790 people.
