= Howmeh Rural District (Behbahan County) =

Rural district in Khuzestan province, Iran

Howmeh Rural District Persian: دهستان حومه
- Rural District
- Location within Iran
- Coordinates: 30°31′37″N 50°14′26″E
- Country: Iran
- Province: Khuzestan
- County: Behbahan
- District: Central
- Capital: Mansuriyeh

Population (2016)
  - Total: 12,200
- Time zone: UTC+3:30 (IRST)

Howmeh Rural District (Persian: دهستان حومه) is in the Central District of Behbahan County, Khuzestan province, Iran. It is administered from the city of Mansuriyeh.

== Demographics ==
=== Population ===
At the time of the 2006 National Census, the rural district's population was 16,969 in 3,521 households. There were 16,676 inhabitants in 4,225 households at the following census of 2011. The 2016 census measured the population of the rural district as 12,200 in 3,237 households. The most populous of its 130 villages was Eslamabad-e Sofla, with 2,900 people.
