= Dodangeh Rural District (Behbahan County) =

Rural district in Khuzestan province, Iran

Dodangeh Rural District Persian: دهستان دودانگه
- Rural District
- Location within Iran
- Coordinates: 30°43′07″N 50°13′49″E
- Country: Iran
- Province: Khuzestan
- County: Behbahan
- District: Central
- Capital: Dodangeh-ye Bozorg

Population (2016)
  - Total: 13,616
- Time zone: UTC+3:30 (IRST)

Dodangeh Rural District (Persian: دهستان دودانگه) is in the Central District of Behbahan County, Khuzestan province, Iran. Its capital is the village of Dodangeh-ye Bozorg.

== Demographics ==
=== Population ===
At the time of the 2006 National Census, the rural district's population was 14,601 in 2,863 households. There were 14,442 inhabitants in 3,614 households at the following census of 2011. The 2016 census measured the population of the rural district as 13,616 in 3,777 households. The most populous of its 45 villages was Kordestan-e Bozorg, with 2,278 people.
