= Tashan-e Sharqi Rural District =

Rural district in Khuzestan province, Iran

Tashan-e Sharqi Rural District Persian: دهستان تشان شرقی
- Rural District
- Location within Iran
- Coordinates: 30°50′34″N 50°10′54″E
- Country: Iran
- Province: Khuzestan
- County: Behbahan
- District: Tashan
- Capital: Tashan

Population (2016)
  - Total: 4,375
- Time zone: UTC+3:30 (IRST)

Tashan-e Sharqi Rural District (Persian: دهستان تشان شرقی) (Note: Formerly Tashan Rural District (دهستان تشان)) is in Tashan District of Behbahan County, Khuzestan province, Iran. It is administered from the city of Tashan. (Note: Formerly the village of Mashhad)

== Demographics ==
=== Population ===
At the time of the 2006 National Census, the rural district's population was 9,656 in 1,992 households. There were 9,159 inhabitants in 2,274 households at the following census of 2011. The 2016 census measured the population of the rural district as 4,375 in 1,218 households. The most populous of its 32 villages was Veysi, with 854 people.
