= Tashan District =

District in Khuzestan province, Iran

Tashan District Persian: بخش تشان
- District
- Location within Iran
- Coordinates: 30°47′28″N 50°05′55″E
- Country: Iran
- Province: Khuzestan
- County: Behbahan
- Capital: Tashan

Population (2016)
  - Total: 12,009
- Time zone: UTC+3:30 (IRST)

Tashan District (Persian: بخش تشان) is in Behbahan County, Khuzestan province, Iran. Its capital is the city of Tashan. (Note: Formerly the village of Mashhad)

== History ==
After the 2011 National Census, the village of Mashhad merged with several villages to become the city of Tashan.

== Demographics ==
=== Population ===
At the time of the 2006 National Census, the district's population was 13,829 in 2,855 households. The following census in 2011 counted 13,312 people in 3,254 households. The 2016 census measured the population of the district as 12,009 inhabitants in 3,331 households.

=== Administrative divisions ===
Tashan District Population
| Administrative Divisions | 2006 | 2011 | 2016 |
|---|---|---|---|
| Tashan-e Gharbi RD | 4,173 | 4,153 | 3,353 |
| Tashan-e Sharqi RD | 9,656 | 9,159 | 4,375 |
| Tashan (city) | | | 4,281 |
| Total | 13,829 | 13,312 | 12,009 |
RD = Rural District
