= Central District (Behbahan County) =

District in Khuzestan province, Iran

Central District (Behbahan County) Persian: بخش مرکزی شهرستان بهبهان
- District
- Location within Iran
- Coordinates: 30°33′14″N 50°14′26″E
- Country: Iran
- Province: Khuzestan
- County: Behbahan
- Capital: Behbahan

Population (2016)
  - Total: 153,861
- Time zone: UTC+3:30 (IRST)

The Central District of Behbahan County (Persian: بخش مرکزی شهرستان بهبهان) is in Khuzestan province, Iran. Its capital is the city of Behbahan.

== History ==
After the 2011 National Census, the village of Mansuriyeh was elevated to the status of a city.

== Demographics ==
=== Population ===
At the time of the 2006 census, the district's population was 130,774 in 30,588 households. The following census in 2011 counted 138,530 people in 37,119 households. The 2016 census measured the population of the district as 153,861 inhabitants in 3,720 households.

=== Administrative divisions ===
Central District (Behbahan County) Population
Administrative Divisions	2006	2011	2016
Dodangeh RD	14,601	14,442	13,616
Howmeh RD	16,969	16,676	12,200
Behbahan (city)	99,204	107,412	122,604
Mansuriyeh (city)			5,441
Total	130,774	138,530	153,861
RD = Rural District
