= Behbahan County =

County in Khuzestan province, Iran

Behbahan County Persian: شهرستان بهبهان
- County
- Location of Behbahan County in Khuzestan province (bottom right, green)

- Location of Khuzestan province in Iran
- Coordinates: 30°31′N 50°13′E
- Country: Iran
- Province: Khuzestan
- Capital: Behbahan
- Districts: Central, Tashan, Zeydun

Population (2016)
  - Total: 180,593
- Time zone: UTC+3:30 (IRST)

Behbahan County (Persian: شهرستان بهبهان) is in Khuzestan province, Iran. Its capital is the city of Behbahan.

== History ==
After the 2011 National Census, Aghajari District was separated from the county in the establishment of Aghajari County. The village of Mansuriyeh was elevated to the status of a city, and the village of Mashhad merged with several villages to become the city of Tashan.

== Demographics ==
=== Population ===
At the time of the 2006 census, the county's population was 172,597, in 39,607 households. The following census in 2011 counted 179,703 people in 47,618 households. The 2016 census measured the population of the county as 180,593 in 51,838 households.

=== Administrative divisions ===
Behbahan County's population history and administrative structure over three consecutive censuses are shown in the following table.

Behbahan County Population
Administrative Divisions	2006	2011	2016
Central District	130,774	138,530	153,861
Dodangeh RD	14,601	14,442	13,616
Howmeh RD	16,969	16,676	12,200
Behbahan (city)	99,204	107,412	122,604
Mansuriyeh (city)			5,441
Aghajari District (Note: Transferred to Aghajari County)	13,155	12,656	
Aghajari RD	3	3	
Aghajari (city)	13,152	12,653	
Tashan District	13,829	13,312	12,009
Tashan-e Gharbi RD	4,173	4,153	3,353
Tashan-e Sharqi RD	9,656	9,159	4,375
Tashan (city) (Note: Formerly the village of Mashhad)			4,281
Zeydun District	14,839	15,076	14,711
Dorunak RD	5,380	4,875	4,311
Sardasht RD	4,487	3,962	3,488
Sardasht (city)	4,972	6,239	6,912
Total	172,597	179,703	180,593
RD = Rural District

== See also ==
- Arrajan

Media related to Behbahan County at Wikimedia Commons
