= Battle of Hella =

1775 battle

- Part of Ottoman–Persian War (1776–1779)
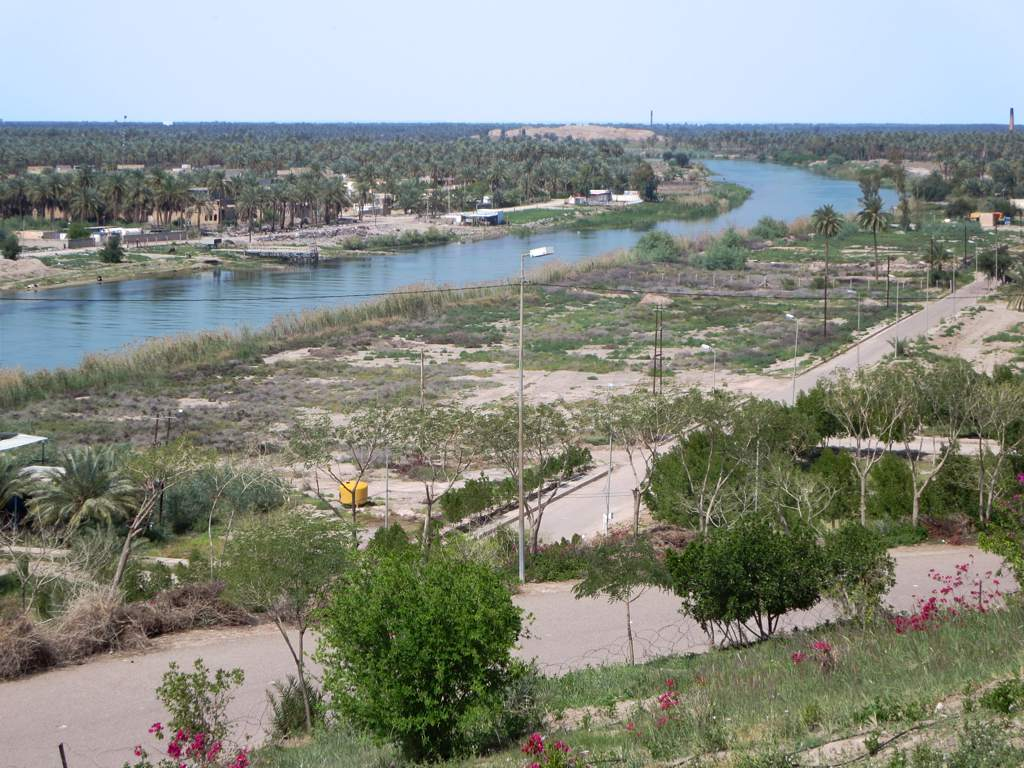
- Hillah River
Date	Late 1775
Location	Hillah, Iraq 32.4775°N 44.431389°E
Result	Zand victory

Belligerents
Ottoman Empire; Mamluk Iraq	Zand Iran; Kingdom of Khaza'il

Commanders and leaders
Unknown commander	Shaykh Ahmad; Shaykh Soltan

The Battle of Hella or Hillah was a minor engagement fought in 1775 between a Zand and Khaza'il contingent and the Mamluks of Iraq during which the Ottomans attempted to relieve the simultaneous Siege of Basra.

== Prelude ==
In January 1775, Sadeq Khan Zand, brother of incumbent Persian monarch Karim Khan Zand set out to besiege the vital port city of Basra. On 6 April, the siege began. He forged dexterous alliances with local tribes including that of the influential Khaza'il in order to hold his frontiers.

The Ottomans in Iraq, governed by the Mamluk Dynasty in Baghdad and the al-Jalili family in Mosul generally spurned assisting Basra in its defense while remaining at large. A relief force was dispatched in 1775. When reports of this reached Sadeq, who at the time was fighting an intervention by the Omanis, he dispatched Shaykh Hamad of Khaza'il to repel them.

== Battle ==
By the time Shaykh Hamad reached Hillah, he failed to detect the Ottoman relief force and returned south. However, they were soon attacked and successfully intercepted near Hella by the Zand-led forces of Shaykh Ahmad and Shaykh Soltan Khaza'il, Shaykh Hamad's brothers, allowing the siege to resume.

== Aftermath ==
The repulsion of the only relief attempt on Basra contributed to the city's surrender on 20 April 1776, and upon their return to Basra, Ahmad and Soltan were honored by Sadeq Khan.
