= Battle of Shatt al-Arab (1778) =

- Part of Ottoman–Persian War (1776–1779)
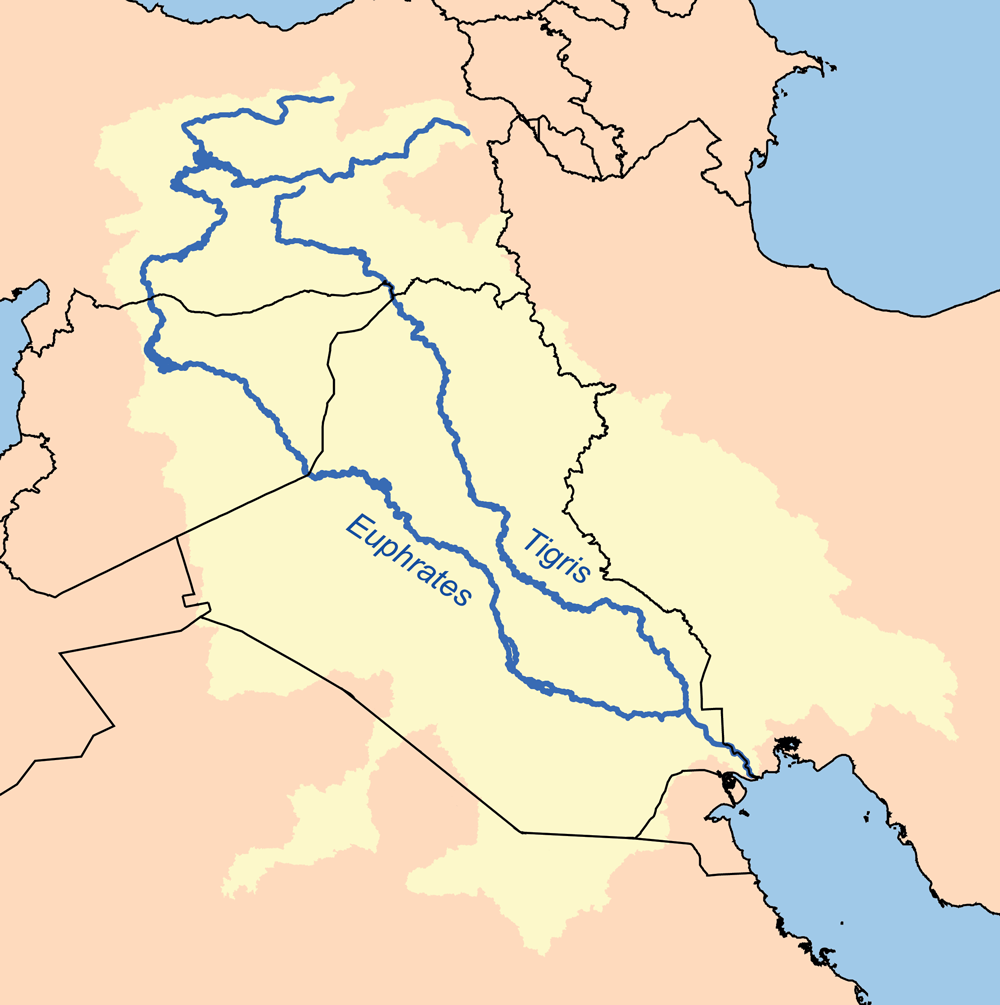
- Shatt al-Arab
Date	1st Battle: 28 May 1778 – 3 June 1778; 2nd Battle: 11 September 1778
Location	Shatt al-Arab, present-day Iraq
Result	Al-Muntafiq victory

Belligerents
Al-Muntafiq; Supported by Ottoman Empire	Zand Iran

Commanders and leaders
Sheikh Thamer; Thwaini al-Saadun	'Ali Mohammad Khan †

Strength
12,000–15,000	6,000–7,000 cavalry, 6,000 foot and 18 gunboats

Casualties and losses
Unknown; likely negligible	Entire force killed; Hundreds drowned to death

The Battle of Shatt al-Arab was a battle during the Ottoman–Persian Wars in Shatt al-Arab, present-day Iraq. In 1778, the Muntafiq (an Arab tribe loyal to the Ottoman Empire) defeated the army of Ali Mohammad Khan Zand.

== Background ==
Basra was, for a long time, a flourishing commercial and cultural center. It was captured by the Ottoman Empire in 1668. It was fought over by Ottomans and Iranians and was the scene of repeated attempts at resistance. From 1697 to 1701, Basra was once again under Safavid control.

The Zand Dynasty under Karim Khan Zand briefly occupied Basra after a siege in 1775-1776. The Zands attempted to introduce the Usuli form of Shiism to the largely Akhbari Shiite Basrans. The shortness of the Zand rule rendered this untenable.

Reinforcements later dispatched from Baghdad were stopped by the Khazail, a Shia Arab tribe backing the Zands. By the spring of 1776, the long siege had reduced the garrison to the verge of starvation. Basra remained under Iranian rule for three years.

== Battle ==
The Iranians launched an attack against Arab forces at the Shatt al-Arab on May 28, 1778, led by Ali Mohammad Khan, however, they were forced to retreat on June 3 after suffering heavy losses.

In the September of 1778 an army led by Ali Mohammad Khan halted on the eastern bank of the Shatt al-Arab with an army of six to seven thousand. They employed eight ships captured from the Arab bandars on the Persian shore to transport their forces to the opposite bank.

The Iranians were unable to fully control the region. The Iranian forces disembarked on the west bank of Shatt al-Arab, specifically near Fudhailah in the proximity of 'Arjah. They were met by a large force of 12,000-15,000 men led by Sheikh Thamer al-Saadun and Thwaini al-Saadun. Arab forces launched a surprise attack on September 11, 1778, and forced the Iranians to retreat. Iranian commander Ali Mohammad was nowhere to be seen. Rumors circulated that he had been killed, but he had managed to make it to Iran.

== Aftermath ==
Iranian forces were forced to retreat. The remaining troops under the command of Ali Mohammad Khan were evacuated by ships in the area on September 13. Subsequently, after the death of Karim Khan Zand, Sadeq Khan Zand, the Iranian ruler of Basra, withdrew with his remaining and weakened garrison and became involved in the power struggles in Iran. Thereupon, the governor of Baghdad, Hasan Pasha, sent a unit under the command of Numan Efendi and recaptured Basra without resistance. Sulayman Agha, the governor who defended Basra against the Iranians during the 1775-1776 siege, was granted the title of Vizier by the Ottoman Empire after his release and was appointed governor of Basra in October. After three years, the Ottomans regained control of Basra.

== Sources ==
- Perry, John (1991). "The Zand dynasty". The Cambridge History of Iran, Vol. 7: From Nadir Shah to the Islamic Republic. Cambridge: Cambridge University Press. pp. 63–104. ISBN 9780521200950.
- Jaques, Tony (30 November 2006). Dictionary of Battles and Sieges: A Guide to 8,500 Battles from Antiquity Through the Twenty-first Century [3 Volumes]. Bloomsbury Academic. ISBN 9780313335365.
- Hala Mundhir, Fattah (1997). The Politics of Regional Trade in Iraq, Arabia, and the Gulf: 1745-1900. SUNY Press. ISBN 9781438402376.
- Perry, John R. (1979). Karim Khan Zand: A History of Iran (1747-1779). University of Chicago Press. ISBN 9780226661025.
- Al-Qasimi, Sultan Bin Muhammad (2022). decline & fall of the zand dynasty. Al-Qasimi publications. ISBN 978-9948-810-63-6.
- Longrigg, Stephen Hemsley (1968). Four Centuries of Modern Iraq. Gregg Press.
- Perry, John R. (2011). "Karim Khan Zand". Encyclopaedia Iranica, Vol. XV, Fasc. 6. pp. 561–564.
