= Mohammed bin Abdul Aziz Al Khouzai =

Iraqi politician and businessman

Mohammed Al Khouzai محمد الخزاعي
- His Highness Sheikh
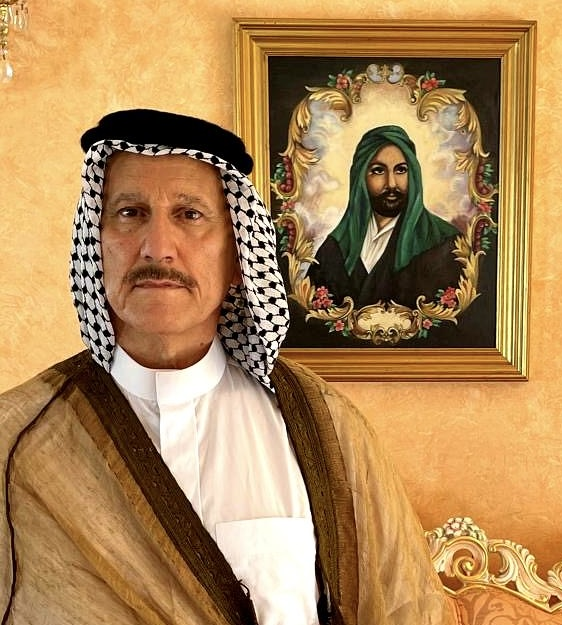
- Sheikh Mohammed in 2024
- Born: 1954 (age 71–72); Al Diwaniyah, Iraq
- Issue: 5
- House: Al Khaza'il
- Father: Abdul Aziz bin Sharmāhi Al Khuza'i

Sheikh Mohammed bin Abdul Aziz Al Khouzai (also transliterated as Alkhouzai; Al Khuza'i) (Arabic: محمد بن عبدالعزيز الخزاعي, romanized: Muḥammad bin ʿAbd al-ʿAzīz al-Khuzaʿī) is an Iraqi politician, diplomat, businessman, leader of the Banu Khuza'ah tribe and head of the Khaza'il Royal dynasty. He is the grandson of Emir Sharmāhi Al Khuza'i, the final King of the Middle and Lower Euphrates. He is known for being forced into exile by former Iraqi President Saddam Hussein for participation with opposition groups, his anti-Iraq War activism and significant reconciliation efforts post-war. In 2020, Sheikh Mohammed's name was put forward to become Prime Minister of Iraq if Mustafa al Kadhimi's interim cabinet failed to receive a majority vote in the Iraqi Parliament. In 2022, his name was again put forward to become Prime Minister of Iraq; he contested with Prime Minister Mohammed Shia' Al Sudani for a nomination by the major political parties to form a cabinet. He is viewed as the de-facto second place in these 2022 elections. In 2026, his name circulated in regional media as the potential nominee for Prime Minister of the Shiite Coordination Framework as an alternative to Nouri Al-Maliki after the 2025 Iraqi Parliamentary Election stalemate.

== Personal life ==
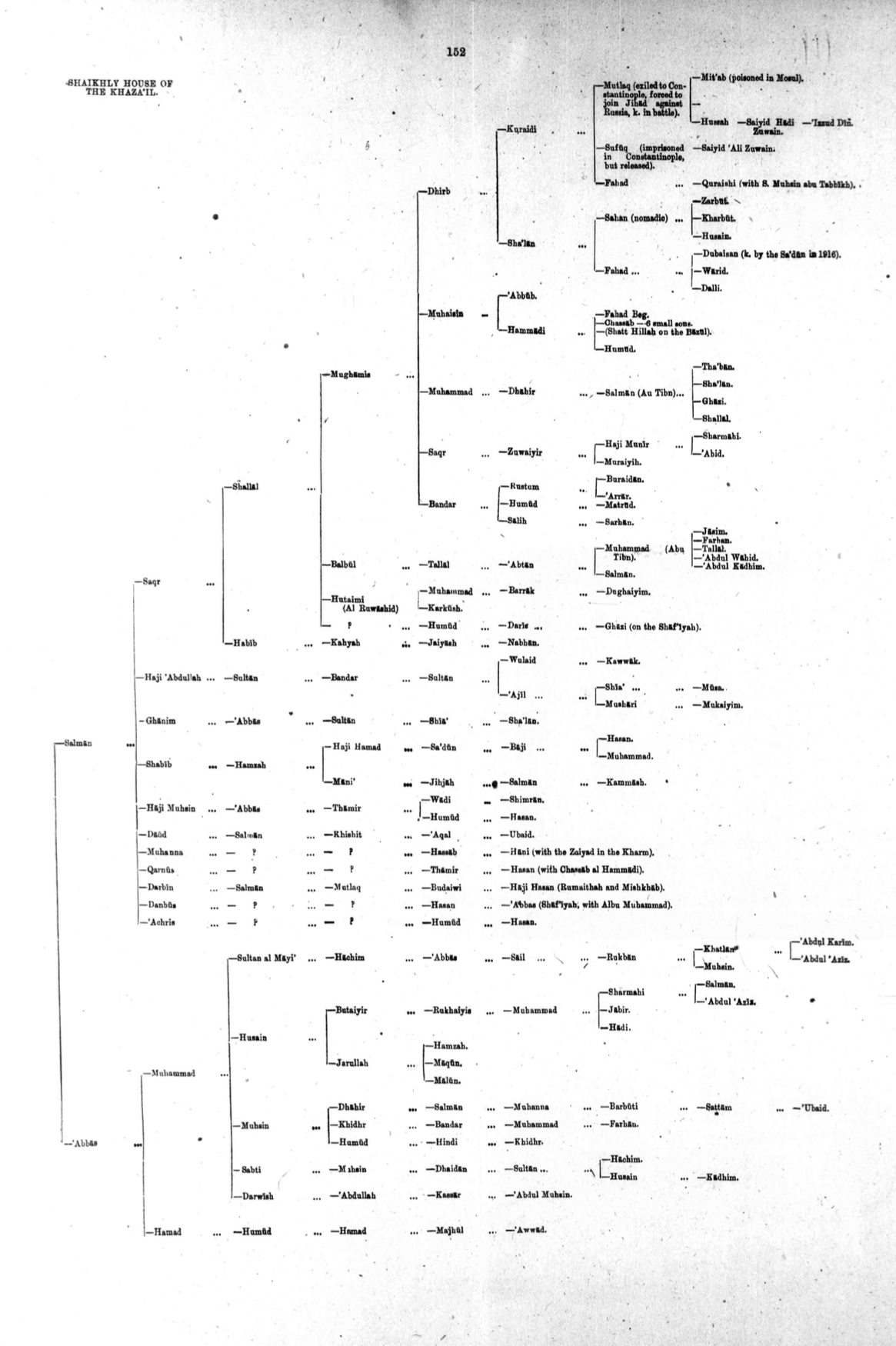
Genealogy of Sheikh Mohammed bin Abdul Aziz bin Sharmāhi Al Khouzai (Khuza'i), taken from British Intelligence-produced genealogical table of the Sheikhly House of Khaza'il, 1918. However, does contain errors as suggested by author.

Sheikh Mohammed was born in 1954 in Al Diwaniyah, the city which his ancestors founded, to Sheikh Abdul Aziz bin Sharmāhi Al Khuza'i, the leader of the Banu Khuza'ah and son of Emir Sharmāhi, the final King of the Middle Euphrates, and the daughter of the Sheikh of the Shammar tribe in Iraq. Sheikh Mohammed moved to the United Kingdom in the 1970s to study Mechanical Engineering. During his time studying, he met his English wife with whom he has 5 children.

== Family ==
Sheikh Mohammed is the son of Sheikh Abdul Aziz bin Sharmāhi Al Khuza'i, the former leader of the Banu Khuza'ah tribe, head of the Khaza'il Royal House and member of the Iraqi Senate. His grandfather Emir Sharmāhi was the final King of the Middle and Lower Euphrates until the Kingdom of Khaza'il was integrated into the modern state of Iraq in 1921. His family was once the wealthiest in Mesopotamia, having ruled from the northern city of Anah to the most southern city of Basra at its peak. They were known for their extensive tolls both on land and the Euphrates River, once the main route along the Silk Road to Baghdad and Aleppo, onto Turkey and Europe. The Khaza'il were also the largest rice and grain suppliers in Iraq and the Middle East.

The Kingdom at its height had an army of 100,000 soldiers and 30,000 cavalry. The Khaza'il established many fortresses and castles throughout their kingdom, some of which remain today such as Dhirb (Zarb) Castle in Al Diwaniyah, named after Emir Dhirb Al Khuza'i.

Sheikh Mohammed's family were renowned as the fiercest enemy of the Ottoman Empire, who failed to subject the Kingdom of Khaza'il to their rule during their occupation of Mesopotamia. Eventually, the relentless resistance of the Khaza'il family over several centuries established the dominance of Shiism in Mesopotamia and ultimately ended 383 years of Ottoman rule in Iraq.

The wife of late King Abdullah of Saudi Arabia, Princess Tathi bint Mishan al Faisal al Jarba is his cousin from his mother's side.

== Exile and Unification Efforts ==
In 1983, Mohammed co-founded the first opposition coalition against Saddam Hussein's regime in London along with Sayyid Mahdi al-Hakim, Sadiq Al-Attiyah, Saad Saleh Jabr, Sayyid Muhammad Bahr al-Uloom and Sayyid Hussein Muhammad al-Sadr. Following his involvement in anti-Saddam Hussein groups in London, Sheikh Mohammed was unable to return to Iraq, having his citizenship formally revoked in May 1998. His Iraqi assets were also confiscated by Saddam Hussein in 1988.

During his time in exile, Sheikh Mohammed founded and financially sponsored the now closed Ahl al-Bayt Islamic Centre in Clapham in 1986, serving as a member of the General Board. He founded the Centre with Sayyid Mahdi al-Hakim who 2 years later was executed by Saddam Hussein's agents in Khartoum, Sadiq al-Attiyah and Sayyid Muhammad Bahr al-Uloom.

Following the death in 2008 of the President of the Central Council of Iraq Clans, Major General Hussein Ali Al-Shaalan Al-Zubaidi by hotel bombing, the Deputy President invited Sheikh Mohammed Al Khouzai to become the next President. The organisation represents 150 tribes in Iraq.

== Iraqi National Accord Conference (2005) ==
In November 2005, Sheikh Mohammed created the Iraqi National Accord Conference, also known as the Iraqi Reconciliation Conference. The three-day event, held at the Arab League headquarters in Cairo, was one of the most significant post-2003 efforts to bring together Iraq’s deeply divided political and religious factions. Sheikh Mohammed began organising the conference over a year earlier in September 2004.

The conference was supported by the United Nations, the Arab League, the European Union, and the United States, and was personally endorsed by UN Secretary-General Kofi Annan, who was represented at the event by Ashraf Qazi, UN Special Representative for Iraq. It marked a rare occasion where all major Iraqi political, sectarian, and ethnic groups were present, including representatives from the Shia, Sunni, and Kurdish communities, as well as tribal leaders and civil society organisations.

=== Preparation ===
Starting in September 2004, Sheikh Mohammed launched intensive negotiations with major Iraqi and international stakeholders, proposing a national reconciliation conference. His efforts included a diplomatic tour across Arab League countries and European nations, where he worked to secure regional and international support for the initiative.

By December 2004, three months of high-level diplomatic efforts had brought the conference into the implementation phase. That same month, a senior United Nations official, who requested anonymity, praised Sheikh Mohammed's efforts, affirming the UN's commitment to sponsor the initiative and provide the necessary diplomatic backing to ensure its success.

On 6 December 2004, Sheikh Mohammed publicly announced his three-stage plan for achieving the reconciliation conference, outlining it to Iraqi media.

=== International and Regional Participation ===
Sheikh Mohammed had gathered the most important national and regional actors together for the conference for the first time in recent Middle Eastern history. The opening session was started by Iraqi President Jalal Talabani, Iraqi Prime Minister Ibrahim al-Jaafari, Egyptian President Hosni Mubarak, and Saudi Foreign Minister Prince Saud bin Faisal Al Saud who represented King Abdullah bin Abdulaziz, alongside Arab League Secretary-General Amr Moussa and UN Special Representative Ashraf Qazi.

In addition, the conference saw participation from:

- Arab League foreign ministers and members of the ministerial committee on Iraq
- Representatives from Iran, Turkey, the Gulf Cooperation Council (GCC), and the European Union
- Delegates from the Islamic Development Bank, Red Crescent, and humanitarian organisations

=== Key Agreements and Outcomes ===
The conference resulted in a unanimous commitment from all Iraqi factions on the following key issues:

- Inclusion of Sunni Arabs in the Political Process: After largely boycotting Iraq’s post-2003 transitional government, Sunni Arab representatives formally agreed to participate in the country’s new political system.
- Commitment to Iraq’s Unity, Sovereignty, and Independence: The delegates affirmed Iraq’s territorial integrity and rejected any external interference in its internal affairs.
- Withdrawal of Foreign Forces: The conference called for the phased withdrawal of foreign troops from Iraq and stressed the need to rebuild the country’s security forces to ensure national stability.
- Recognition of National Resistance, Rejection of Terrorism: The attendees acknowledged the legitimacy of armed resistance against foreign occupation but unanimously condemned terrorism, sectarian violence, and attacks on civilians, religious sites, and humanitarian institutions.
- Political and Religious Tolerance: The factions committed to peaceful dialogue and agreed to reject sectarian incitement and extremist ideologies such as takfirism (the practice of declaring fellow Muslims as infidels).
- Release of Detainees and Rule of Law: The conference called for the immediate release of prisoners who had not been charged with crimes and an end to arbitrary detentions.

=== Formation of Working Groups ===
As a result of the conference, two working groups were established to oversee the implementation of the agreements:

1. Political Reconciliation Working Group – Led by Saudi Foreign Minister Prince Saud bin Faisal Al Saud, this group was tasked with coordinating Iraq’s national reconciliation process.
2. Confidence-Building Measures Committee – Headed by Sudanese Foreign Minister Mustafa Osman Ismail, this group focused on restoring trust between Iraq’s sectarian and political factions.

A special preparatory committee was also established to plan a follow-up conference in Baghdad in early 2006 to begin implementing the Cairo agreements.

=== Collapse of the Peace Agreement ===
Despite the historic nature of the conference and its broad international support, the peace agreement was short-lived.

In February 2006, Al-Qaeda bombed the Al Askari Golden Mosque in Samarra, one of the holiest Shia sites in Iraq. The attack triggered widespread sectarian violence, leading to a dramatic escalation in Sunni-Shia hostilities and effectively undermining the reconciliation efforts agreed upon in Cairo. The follow-up conference scheduled for March 2006 in Baghdad was derailed by the deteriorating security situation, and the country plunged into widespread sectarian conflict that continued for several years.

=== Legacy and Impact ===
Sheikh Mohammed's Iraqi National Accord Conference remains one of the most significant attempts at national reconciliation in Iraq’s post-2003 history. It was the first and only time that all major Iraqi factions, including Sunni and Shia insurgents, participated in a UN and Arab League-sponsored peace process.

Although the agreements were not fully implemented, the conference set an important precedent for future diplomatic efforts to stabilize Iraq. Sheikh Mohammed Al Khouzai's leadership in the initiative was widely acknowledged by international and regional actors, and his role in Iraq’s early reconciliation efforts continues to be referenced in discussions on post-war nation-building.

== Iraqi Forum for Dialogue ==
In January 2022, Sheikh Mohammed established a think-tank based in Baghdad called the Iraqi Forum for Dialogue. The institution's aim is to provide Iraqi decision makers with practical solutions to rebuild the Iraqi state, namely in eradicating sectarianism, political violence, corruption and security concerns. Members include senior Iraqi politicians, clergymen, defence and intelligence officials, among civil society actors. These include former Prime Minister Haider al-Abadi, former Oil Minister Ibrahim Bahr al-Ulloum and Head of the Iraqi Sunni Scholars Union, Sheikh Khaled al-Mulla. Former Iraqi Minister of Defence Erfan al-Hiyali wrote of the initiative:

"I am honoured to join this great group of indigenous Iraqis who carry Iraq in their hearts...aiming through this forum for fruitful and vigorous communication in exchanging opinions and proposals, building a scientific and practical vision that helps the country to heal its wounds."

== Prime Ministerial Candidacy ==
=== 2020 Nominations ===
In 2020, Sheikh Mohammed Al Khouzai was approached by the representative of Shia cleric Sayyid Muqtada Al-Sadr, along with some members of the Coordination Framework, an alliance of major Shia political parties that includes the Islamic Dawa Party, to run for prime minister in the event that prime ministerial nominee Mustafa Al-Kadhimi's cabinet could not secure a majority vote in Parliament. However, Al-Kadhimi received a majority vote in Parliament, becoming prime minister in May 2020.

=== 2022 Candidacy ===
Following the political deadlock Iraq faced after the October 2021 General Election where no party won enough votes to form a government, Sheikh Mohammed Al Khouzai was approached by senior Parliamentary, military and civil society figures to run for prime minister. His candidacy was supported by Dr Mahmoud Al-Mashhadani, MP and former head of the Iraqi Parliament; Sayyid Ibrahim Bahr al-Uloom, former Minister of Oil; Erfan al Hiyali, former minister of defence; Sheikh Saad Nayef Mashhan Al-Hardan, Head of the Dulaim Tribe; Sheikh Ghassan Aboud Ilhaymous, Head of Tribe Albu Saltan; Sheikh Abdulillah Fahim al Farhud; and Judge Mouayid Riyah. He was also supported by Shia cleric Muqtada Al-Sadr until Al-Sadr withdrew all of his MPs from Parliament, giving the Coordination Framework the majority they required to nominate Mohammed Shia' Al-Sudani, the current Prime Minister of Iraq. During his running for prime minister, he met with several British officials including the Chairman of the Royal United Services Institute (RUSI) and former Deputy-Prime Minister of Britain David Lidington to discuss the issues facing Iraq. Sheikh Al Khouzai reached second place in the nominations.

=== 2026 Nominations ===
During the political deadlock produced by the 2025 Iraqi Parliamentary Election, according to multiple regional news outlets, Sheikh Al Khouzai is one of the primary figures mentioned amongst the Shiite Coordination Framework as their potential nominee for the position of Prime Minister of Iraq as an alternative to Nouri Al-Maliki to replace Mohammed Shia Al Sudani.
