= Stephen Hemsley Longrigg =

British oil executive, military administrator, and historian (1893–1979)

Stephen Hemsley Longrigg OBE (7 August 1893 – 11 September 1979) was a British military governor, petroleum company manager and a leading authority on the history of oil in the Middle East.

== Early life and career ==
Longrigg was born in Sevenoaks, Kent, and educated at Highgate School in London, where he won the Governors' gold medal and was later Chairman of Governors from 1954 - 1965. After winning a scholarship to study Classics at Oriel College, Oxford, where he gained a 1st in Honour Moderations, he served in the Royal Warwickshire Regiment from 1914, was twice mentioned in dispatches and then returned to Oxford from Iraq for his MA degree at the end of his military service in 1921. He then joined the British Administration in Iraq and served as Inspector-General of Revenue between 1927 and 1931. It was during this time that he wrote Four Centuries of Modern Iraq (1925), a history of Iraq under the Ottoman Empire.

== Career with the Iraq Petroleum Company ==
In 1931, as part of a policy to replace British officials with Iraqis, Longrigg left the administration and joined the Iraq Petroleum Company (IPC). By now he was an accomplished linguist and Arabist, with a wide knowledge of tribal affairs

He joined IPC at a time when the Company was preparing to build the first pipeline system from Kirkuk to the Mediterranean. Being appointed as a Land and Liaison Officer, Longrigg's role was to organise the purchase of land for the pipeline, pumping stations, terminals and depots along the route. He also had to organise the recruitment of labour, rates of pay and conditions of employment, and to make arrangements for the security of Company personnel and property.

In 1933, before the pipeline was completed, Longrigg was sent to Jeddah to join negotiations for an oil concession for the eastern province of Saudi Arabia. He was unsuccessful in this, on account of IPC's refusal to make payments to the Saudi Arabian government in gold rather than rupees. The successful bidder, Standard Oil of California, went on to discover oil at Dammam in 1938 and in due course became known as Aramco. In 1936, Longrigg was appointed general manager of an IPC subsidiary company, Petroleum Concessions Ltd, and spent that summer in Saudi Arabia obtaining oil concessions for the provinces of Hejaz and Asir (IPC did not find oil and abandoned the concession in 1941). Later in the 1930s, he played an important part in obtaining the first oil concessions for the Trucial Coast, including one for the sheikhdom of Abu Dhabi for 75 years, agreed on 14 January 1939.

== War service ==
During World War II, Longrigg was appointed to the rank of Brigadier. Having a good command of Arabic, he served on the general staff of Army headquarters in Cairo, planning for the expected occupation of Italian colonial possessions in Africa. He served in Somalia, became Deputy Chief Political Officer, Cyrenaica, and then Chief Administrator (military governor) of Eritrea, in which office he served from 1942 to 1944. He wrote A Short History of Eritrea (1945) shortly afterwards.

== Academic and writing career ==
After the war, Longrigg returned to the Iraq Petroleum Company until his retirement in 1951. He authored the IPC Handbook, published in 1948. He updated his book on Iraq with Iraq 1900-1950 (1953) and followed this with more books: Oil in the Middle East (1954, 3rd edition 1968), Syria and Lebanon Under French Mandate (1958), and The Middle East: A Social Geography (1963, 2nd edition 1970). In 1955 he gained an Oxford D.Litt. and regularly undertook lectures abroad, especially in the US and Canada. He was visiting professor, Columbia University in 1966, and the University of Colorado in 1967.

== Awards ==
Longrigg was appointed OBE in 1927. In 1954 he was awarded a D.Litt. degree by the University of Oxford. He received the Lawrence of Arabia Medal in 1962 and the Richard Burton Memorial Medal in 1969.

== Death ==
Longrigg died on 11 September 1979 at the Otara Nursing Home, Kingsley Green, Sussex.
