= Siege of Basra (1775–1776) =

1775–1776 Siege

- Part of Ottoman–Persian War (1776–1779)
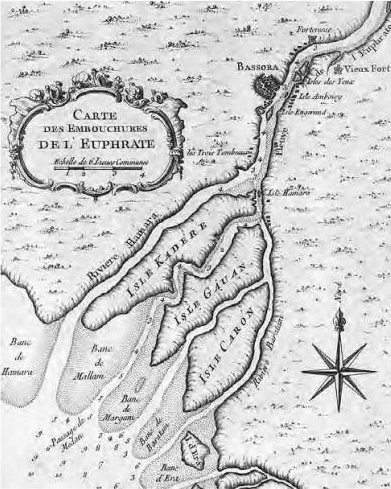
- 1764 map of Basra
Date	6 April 1775 – 20 April 1776
Location	Basra, Mamluk Iraq 30.515°N 47.81°E
Result	Zand victory
Territorial changes	Basra occupied by the Zands until Karim Khan Zand's death

Belligerents
Ottoman Empire; Pashalik of Iraq; Al-Muntafiq; Omani Empire; East India Company	Zand Iran; Bushehr Sheikhdom; Banu Ka'b; Supported by: Al-Qasimi; Khaza'il; Banu Khaled

Commanders and leaders
Solayman Aqa (surrendered); Abd ol-Rahman (surrendered); Shaykh Mohanna; Ahmad bin Said; Henry Moore	Sadeq Khan Zand; Ali Mohammad Zand; Shaykh Ahmad; Shaykh Naser; Hajji Naser

Strength
Land forces 15,000 levies and tribesmen 1,500 janissaries 300 Montafiq tribesmen 8 twelve-pounder cannons; 50 six-nine pounder cannons Naval forces ~70 gallivats, 70 trankeys, Rahmani, Eagle, Success, and Assistance ships, nine large ships and 35 smaller ships	Land forces 30–50,000 or 45–60,000 (24,000 Lurs/Kurds, 3,000 Bakhtiari, 4,000 from other Lur clans, 12,000 troops from Ajam, and 6,000 Farsis). otherwise 30,000 strong Naval forces 16 ships including 10 gallivats and the ship Tyger, 14 gulf gallivants and 50 smaller ships

Casualties and losses
At least 30 men killed, a few wounded; entire garrison plus armaments eventually surrendered and 50–200,000+ civilian casualties from war and plague (Note: Estimates of the depopulation of Basra range from Agent Moore's highly unrealistic 200,000 deaths in the town itself and 2,000,000 over the whole area, through other British estimates of 140,000 deaths, or 3,000 per day, to Sestini's more cautious conjecture of a drop in population from 50,000 to 20,000–30,000 over the period of the plague and the Iranian occupation.)	100–2,000+ men killed and a couple of ships lost

The Siege of Basra was a siege engagement fought between the armies of the brother of Karim Khan Zand, Sadeq Khan Zand, and the local Ottoman governor of Basra who was subordinate to the Mamluk rulers of Iraq.

The Siege began on 6 April 1775 with intensive bombardment and assaults against the city walls. The Zands fended off the British, destroying their blockade and compelling a withdrawal, as well as the Omanis, who were funnelled into the city toward late 1775 after landing and eventually left due to provisioning issues. As a result of these developments, the garrison commander, Soleyman Aqa, surrendered on 20 April 1776. Sadeq Khan entered the city the following day.

The Siege, while in hindsight critical, provided little trade leverage to the Zands after the city was heavily damaged and the British withdrawal. It remained occupied until 1779 when the Zands withdrew due to the death of Karim Khan Zand that year.

== Prelude ==
In 1774, an undeclared war was initiated between the Ottoman Empire and the Zand dynasty of Iran regarding trading affairs and skirmishes between Khosrow Bozorgi of Ardalan and the Ottoman pasha of Baban on the border of the Pashalik. A force of Banu Ka'b tribesmen had additionally attacked Basra in April 1774 and burnt parts of the city. Karim Khan Zand dispatched a standing army under his brother, Sadeq Khan Zand, in an effort to capture the vital port of Basra and enforce terms on the Ottomans.

On 10 January 1775, Sadeq Khan Zand approached Khuzestan with this force on 12 March and passed both Shushtar and Hoveyzeh respectively. He was at Sowayb with about 30,000 troops on 16 March and repelled some defenders at the Shatt al-Arab. The Montafeq, who were aligned with the Ottomans, took little action to repel the siege and remained posted near Zubayr in spite of calls from Mutasallem Solayman Aqa to flood the Shatt. Sadeq's forces regrouped beyond the Shatt on 4 April and he arrived to personally command this force on 6 April, beginning the siege.

== Siege ==
On the 7th, some Iranian troops were shot by the garrison and on the 8th, sixteen ships including ten gallivants and the captured ship Tyger, engaged the British navy but were driven away. Several attempts by Sadeq to make the British buy him off failed. Diplomatic developments took place in Shiraz as the Ottoman sultan Abdul Hamid I dispatched an ambassador named Sunbulzade Vehbi Efendi in April 1775. He was supposed to address events on other frontiers and inform Karim of Abdul Hamid's accession, leaving in September with little progress. Sadeq then resolved on a night raid on 9 April against Basra, but suffered 100 and only inflicted 30. The Zands had additionally been aided by Shaykh Naser of Bushehr, who was a Zand vassal, with 1500 men, 14 gulf gallivants and 50 smaller ships who'd arrived on 31 March, as well as the Banu Ka'b with ground troops. On 16 April, the Persians pitched camp 3 miles upstream.

Sadeq soon began to encircle Basra fully with picket lines. They bombarded Basra the entire night of 26 April and launched major assaults with scaling ladders but failed in breaching. They once attacked a weak point after it was revealed by a turncoat and destroyed part of the defense and four turrets, yet were repulsed; the Basrans claimed to have killed 2,000 besiegers while only suffering 2 wounded Another deserter revealed a way via a water gate, but before the Zands could fully investigate, they were distracted by a sortie they repelled. Sadeq also allied with Hajji Naser of Hawr ol-Hammar to guard the dikes so the Montafeq don't destroy them.

=== British withdrawal ===
Throughout the conflict, in Khuzestan, under the leadership of Henry Moore, the British constructed a chain to inhibit further Banu Ka'b aid behind the Zand position, and captured and burned a couple of their boats. This was a result of an ongoing struggle between the East India Company and the Banu Ka'b, who were directly supporting the Zands, and to prevent a Persian trade monopoly. They at least had 2 gallivats, and the Eagle and Success ships as they were named. (Note: So large was the company’s naval commitment to the Ottomans in Basrathat in 1774 a report was written from Bombay Castle stating, “As aconsiderable part of ourmarine force is employed at Bassora and in the Persian Gulf, we have at present not a sufficient marine force for the protection of our trade on the Coast of Malabar from the Maratha fleet, which, it is most probable, will attempt making some depredations on it.”) The Montafiq withdrew from Zubayr and forfeited their supplies to the Zands, who began receiving support from Shia Khaza'el Arabs nearby to maintain their supplies and prevent harassment by the Montafeq or Banu Khaled. On 11 April, Shaykh Naser skirmished with the British fleet before retiring to Bushehr, then returned on the 15th and broke through the chain to join the siege effort.

The British Agent and negotiator at Bushehr got two hostages released from Karim and re-established his base in Bushehr, ending his support for Agent Moore, who, disgraced, moved to Bombay in July; this directly ended British military efforts in the Persian Gulf.

=== Omani intervention ===
When the siege first began, Omar Pasha of Baghdad sent a letter to Oman requesting naval support in spite of not directly intervening to protect the city.

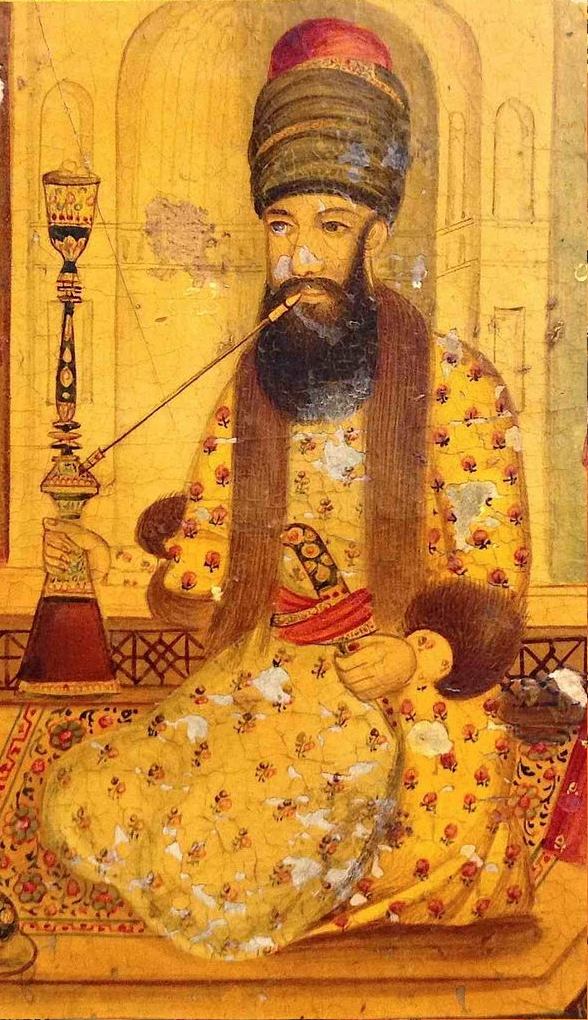
Sadeq Khan Zand

On 3 May Oman sent two gallivants, returned on 5 June, and then sent an armada in mid-august with the Rahmani ship, nine large ships, thirty-fifty smaller ones, and seventy gallivants and trankeys with supplies that passed Bushehr on 11 September and then reached the Shatt, so the Zands built a chain over the Shatt entrance guarded by cannon and Ka'b soldiers, but a strong wind destroyed it in mid-October and on the 14th the Omanis entered Basra. Several indecisive and bloody sorties and attacks happened, and Sadeq guarded all supplies to stop foraging. He gained reinforcements from 'Ali Mohammad Khan Zand and a deadlock took place with constant artillery barraging. In spite of the Omani intervention led by Ahmad abu Said bolstering the garrison's morale, in early 1776 the Omanis withdrew since their supplies were running out; their fleet was gone by Spring.

=== Surrender of Basra ===
By the time the Omanis left, the state of Basra was reduced to a point where some of the Montafeq and Basrans began leaving the city and being fed by the Zands. Morale dwindled within the garrison, especially after the al-Jalili family that ruled Mosul refused to provide reinforcements. Sadeq also aligned with the Banu Khaled by granting them robes of honor and an escort after repelling a raid of theirs. Suleiman Aqa executed his commander and placed his nephew, 'Abd ol-Rahman in charge, but he let troops slip out and surrendered. Suleiman opened negotiations on 16 April and surrendered on 20 April, with Sadeq entering the day after.

== Aftermath ==
When Sadeq entered Basra, he rounded up all political and financial authorities including the Solayman Aqa and sent them to Shiraz. As a result of the Porte and Pasha of Baghdad's mutual negligence of Basra, the city had fallen to the Zands, who established a local administration that lasted until the death of Karim Khan Zand in 1779, when coins were struck in Karim Khan Zand's name as well as those of the twelve imams, and introduced Friday Shia sermons. A garrison of 6,000 was left in the town.

The Banu Ka'b were endowed with the fields of Hindiyan as a reward for their support during the siege, which included the use of vessels to counter the British, in return for an annual tax of 1,000 Tumans to Karim.

Soleyman Aqa was able to recapture the city and a status quo was reached in which the borders of the Treaty of Zuhab were re-affirmed for the last time. The city never recovered from the destruction and Persian trade routes shifted north.
