= Four Centuries of Modern Iraq =

Book by Stephen Hemsley Longrigg

- Author: Stephen Hemsley Longrigg
- Language: English
- Genre: History
- Publisher: Garnet Publishing
- Publication date: Garnet (December 31, 2002)
- Publication place: UK
- Media type: Print
- Pages: 378 pages
- ISBN: 9781859641699

Four Centuries of Modern Iraq is a historic book authored by Stephen Hemsley Longrigg published first time in United Kingdom on 1925. It covers events in Iraq between early 16th century to early 20th century when Iraq was a neglected part of the Ottoman Empire. Few books have been written about Iraq in that period. The author uses oriental sources, the books of Iraqi historians and the experience of his long residence in Iraq to discuss the country’s turbulent history. The author concludes that Iraq had made little progress during the last four centuries and it still lacked the ability and resources to be independent and self-govern.
