= Kingdom of Khaza'il =

Former Arab Kingdom in Iraq

Emirate of Khaza'il Kingdom of the Middle and Lower Euphrates إمارة الخزاعل
- 1534–1921
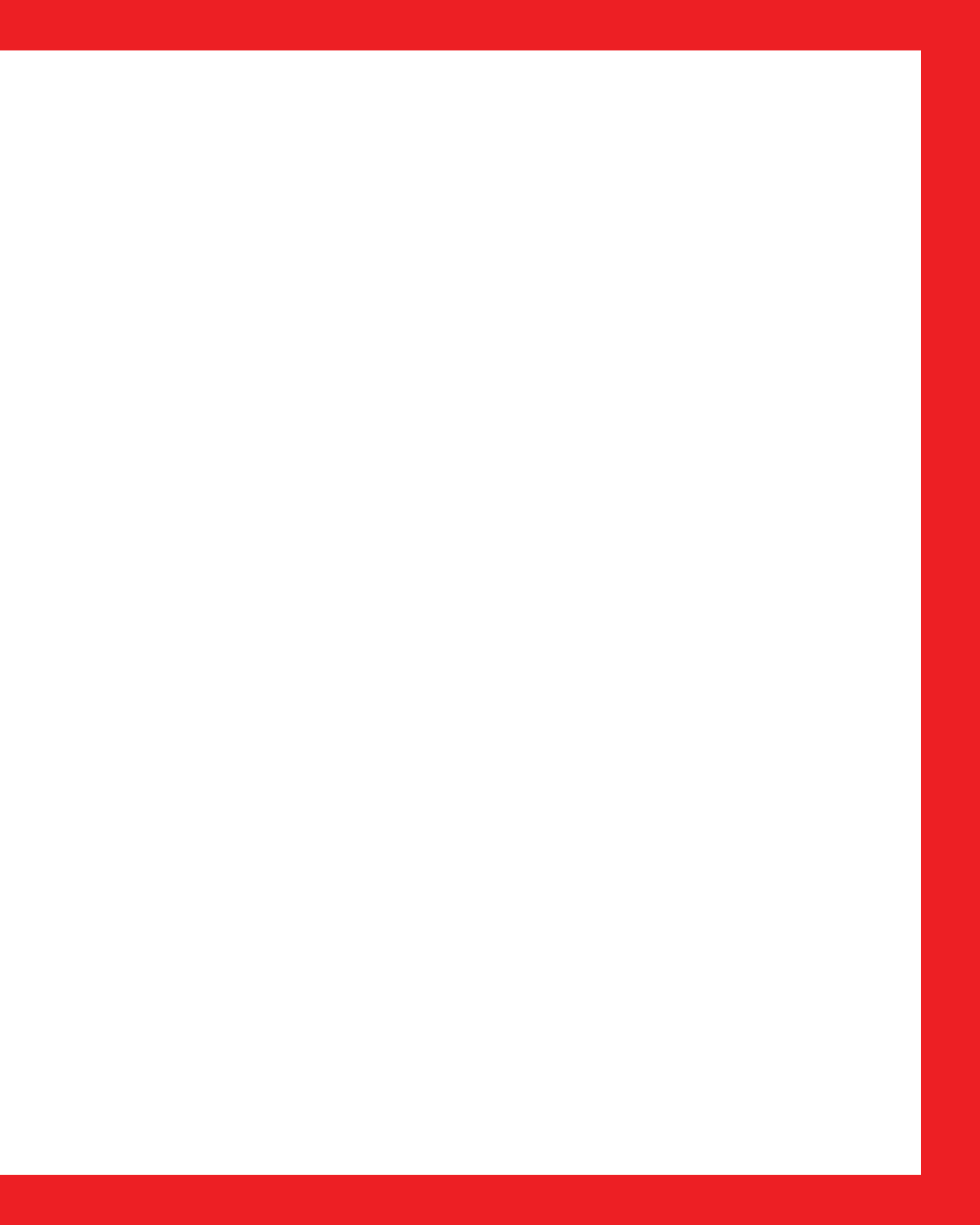
- Flag

- Kingdom of Khaza'il shaded in Green showing its territorial boundaries at its peak during the late 17th to late 19th century from Anah to Basra.
- Capital: The capital moved between these cities: List: Al Diwaniyah; Hillah; Najaf; Karbala; Lamlūm; Imam Hamzeh; Musayyib; Samawah; Shamiyah
- Largest city: Basra
- Official languages: Arabic
- Religion: Twelver Shia Islam (Official); Sunni islam Christianity; Judaism; Mandaeism
- Type: Khaza'il Sheikhly House
- Government: Monarchy
  - (Final King) Emir: Sharmāhi bin Muhammad
- History
  - Established: 1534
  - Disestablished: 1921

Area
  - Total: 150,000–200,000 km^{2} (58,000–77,000 sq mi)
Preceded by	Succeeded by
Ottoman Empire	Mandatory Iraq
- Today part of: Iraq; Iran; Kuwait

The Kingdom of Khaza'il (Arabic: أمير الخزاعل العام عبعوب آغا مملكة الخزاعل, romanized: Mamlakat al-Khaza'il), also known as the Kingdom of Khuza'ah, Emirate of Khaza'il (Arabic: إمارة الخزاعل, romanized: Imārat al-Khaza'il) to the Arabs and officially as the Kingdom of the Middle and Lower Euphrates (Arabic: مملكة الفرات الأوسط والأسفل, romanized: Mamlakat al-Furāt al-Awsaṭ wa-al-Asfal) by Britain, was an autonomous kingdom in present-day Iraq that resisted Ottoman colonial rule from the early 16th century to the early 20th century. Ruled by the Khaza'il Royal family, also known as the Banu Khuza'ah Sheikhly dynasty, the Kingdom exercised military, economic, and political sovereignty, particularly in the Middle and Lower Euphrates region.

At the height of their power in the 17th, 18th and 19th century, the Khaza'il ruled from the northern city of Anah to Basra, including the southern outskirts of Baghdad and all cities along both sides of the Euphrates River, controlling all cultivatable land and tribal forces in their territory. The Emirs of Khaza'il were known for their fierce armed resistance to Ottoman imperial authority lasting several centuries, vast land ownership, and their immense wealth established through the creation of Silk Road taxation mechanisms and agricultural monopoly. They are also known for establishing the dominance of Shiism in Mesopotamia and ending 383 years of Ottoman Empire rule in Iraq.

== History ==
=== Pre-formation ===
Before becoming an autonomous Emirate, the Khaza'il, known in Arabic as the Khuza'a, Khuza'ah or Khaza'ah had a long history in Mesopotamia, having travelled from Mecca in present-day Saudi Arabia at an unknown date during the Early Muslim Conquests; although some scholars tie their move as a cohesive tribal unit to Mesopotamia in the 14th century. The first known record of them as a tribal unit in Iraq was in 1580 through the Ottoman cadastral survey that highlighted the Khaza'il Sheikhs and their livestock, based in the Rumahiyya region in the Middle Euphrates. However, contemporary analysis by British Colonial Administrators of fortresses established by the Khaza'il, namely Ruhabah, ~20 miles South West of Najaf suggest a ruling presence in the area from the early 16th century or perhaps even before.

The Khaza'il played a substantial role in the establishment of the Abbasid Caliphate with some of the most senior positions under the Caliphs being held by members of the tribal family. This includes the Vizier to the Caliph, Master of Post, the holder of the Royal Seal, Governors of the Abbasid provinces and the Head of the Abbasid Armies among others.

Before their migration to Mesopotamia from their early origins around Medina, the Khaza'il family played a prominent role in the beginnings of Islam, having been the Custodians of Mecca for around 400 years prior to the Islamic prophet Muhammad. As early supporters of Islam, they contributed greatly to Muhammad's army during the Conquest of Mecca which began as a result of a breach of the Treaty of Hudaybiyyah by the Banu Bakr against the Khaza'il (Banu Khuza'ah). Several members of Muhammad's companions were from the tribe as well as several members of Muhammad's own family.

=== Early formation ===
After the Ottoman Empire conquered Baghdad from its Safavid occupiers in 1534, they controlled most territories around the city but were unable to capture those along the Middle and Lower Euphrates given the resistance faced by the local tribal rulers of the Khaza'il. Although Ottoman records do not have the names of Khaza'il rulers during this period, British explorer Ralph Fitch noted in 1583 the resistance of these local Arab rulers in the Basra region along the Euphrates River.

Prior to the Khaza'il rule of the Middle Euphrates under the Shah of Iran, Mir Nasir, also known as Nasir bin Muhannā or Nasir Al Muhannā, was a Khaza'il King of the southerly stretch of Iraq, from Najaf to Fallujah, during the late 16th century to early 17th century. Although Iraq was formerly under Ottoman colonial rule, the Pasha's power to govern the fringes outside of Baghdad were limited and so resulted in reluctant mutual acceptance between Emir Muhannā and Ottoman governors, albeit temporarily. As British colonial administrator Stephen Helmsley Longrigg wrote:

"Mir Nasir, or Nasir bin Muhanna, was in 1604 the "king" of the more southerly, which stretched from Najf to Fallujah. Najf, always fanatical and now impoverished since death cut off the bounties of Shah Tahmasp, admitted the power of this desert ruler. Karbala, not less intolerant but larger and more prosperous, was the centre of his dirah. Travellers from Baghdad to Fallujah were met but a few miles from the capital by his agents and paid his tolls."

When payments to the Shia religious centres of Karbala and Najaf from the Iranian Shah Tahmasp dried up upon his death in 1576, and the Ottoman Empire having invaded Iran during the Ottoman–Persian Wars (1603) leading to the removal of Janissaries from the Najaf-Karbala region, Emir Muhannā cemented his ultimate rule over the province in 1604.

For other scholars, the official reign of the Khaza'il began in 1622 when the Safavid Empire conquered Mesopotamia from its Ottoman occupiers who had been in control of the country since 1534. Shah Abbas I, commonly known as Abbas the Great, appointed the leader of the Khaza'il tribal family Muhannā ibn Ali Al-Khaza'il as the Khan of the Middle Euphrates from Hit to Al Aqrah (Nasiriyah), where the Khaza'il had controlled semi-autonomously since the disintegration of the Mongol dynasties in the early 15th century. His territory headquartered in Samawah but extended far across the Jaza'ir (Jazira) region of southern Mesopotamia. However, the Khaza'il's reign under the Safavids did not last for long, ending in 1641, three years following the reconquering of Mesopotamia by Sultan Murad IV. A fierce battle lasting several months ensued, resulting in the massacre of Khaza'il tribesmen; 600 heads of senior tribesmen were brought to the new Ottoman Pasha Darwish Muhammad in Baghdad by his military general 'Ali Agha, as war trophies. Sheikh Muhanna and his entourage escaped to Persia under the Safavids where some stayed while others returned to their homeland in the Euphrates in the decades succeeding. Muhanna was given the fiefdom of Zeydân along the Eastern coast of the Persian Gulf for him and his tribesmen by Shah Safi. However, this did not signal the end of Khaza'il autonomous rule; Qurna was attacked in 1653, a revolt in 1657, a force marched against Basra with the Al-Muntafiq in 1690 and the pillaging of villages with Shammar and Anaza tribesmen, threatening the city of Hillah in 1705.

=== Turn of the 18th century ===
In the first few months of 1700, massive flooding affected the Lower Euphrates rendering Ottoman forces incapacitated. Ibn 'Abbas, the Sheikh of the Khaza'il capitalised on this, re-taking the ancient Rumahiyya fort, Hiskah and the outskirts of Najaf. His son, Sheikh Salman Al-Khaza'il besieged Hillah. The Ottoman Sultan Mustafa II, realising the danger to his Empire's power in Mesopotamia sent the new Baghdad governor Daltaban Mustafa Pasha, who was later to become the Grand Vizier of the Ottoman Empire, to assemble a massive military force against the Khaza'il. Kurdish contingents along with timariots (cavalry) from half of the Eyalets of Eastern Turkey were sent, with heavy weaponry brought along the Tigris by flotilla to the Ottoman Pasha in Basra. Although the intervention repelled the incursion, it did not remove the Khaza'il from their areas of sovereign control.

With the Euphrates avulsion creating a new channel eastwards to Hasaka, giant marshlands akin to seas were created, giving rise to the Khaza'il eponym as the Marsh Arab Kings of Iraq. Emir Salman, the leader of the Khaza'il and the eldest brother of future Emirs Sheikh Mohammed and Sheikh Hamad called for independence among the Arab tribes, marking the Khaza'il as the most powerful force in the Middle Euphrates. As Professor of History Faisal Husain writes:

"They [tribesmen] refused to pay taxes and fortified their positions in the marshes. From the midst of an environmentally and politically fragmented landscape, a charismatic leader emerged, rocketing his tribe to fame across Iraq. ... [Salman] proclaimed his sovereign rule in the region between Hasaka and Najaf and spread his call for independence among the neighbouring tribes. ... After transferring villagers to cultivate his newly conquered land, Sheikh Salman besieged the Hilla fortress, the last pillar of Ottoman rule in Iraq's Middle Euphrates region. ... Sheikh Salman emerged in 1700 with a hefty military force of 10,000 men armed with muskets and spears. By 1701, he had brought most of Rumahiyya's districts under his sway. The Khaza'il ... had turned into 'kings of the Middle Euphrates'"

In an attempt to quell the ambitions of the Khaza'il, the Grand Vizier of the Ottoman Empire Amcazade Köprülü Hüseyin Pasha sent a threatening letter to Sheikh Salman saying his activities put him against the "Lord of Mud and Water":

"When the wrath of the Padishah [Sultan] becomes manifest, in God we seek refuge [from such outcome], the rock and clay, the beasts of the land and the sea, and even the bird on the tree will be your enemies."

Emir Salman is reported to have responded: "Arrogant and ignorant gibberish, with some irrelevant words [put together]," so "he deserved reproach and punishment."

=== Marsh rule and resistance ===
With the flooding of the Euphrates creating enormous marshlands that remain to present day, the Khaza'il built the centre of their Dirah within the marshes, transforming their ancient tribal traditions of nomadism to semi-nomadic life. This amphibious way of life made it extraordinarily difficult for the Ottoman armies to invade and subjugate the Khaza'il. As Husain elucidates, "the Khaza'il, emerged from the flourishing marshes of the Middle Euphrates, built its power, and challenged the authority of one of the world's most powerful early modern empires." The Khaza'il used the waters for animal husbandry, agriculture, as well as hubs for resistance and defence. For travellers and explorers passing through their territory, they were regarded as "really amphibious, for they live as much on water as on land." French diplomat Pierre Joseph de Beauchamp noted that as the water level rose in the Khaza'il marshes:

"In a quarter of an hour, [they] can carry away their mat huts and regain dry land by swimming; men take their sabres, spears, and pots, and the women their children; I have seen a hundred times women cutting a handful of reeds, there placing their nursing infants and crossing the river; those children of 7 or 8 years follow them swimming...and with superior skill ... in a manner so that one only sees the tips of their noses."

William Francis Ainsworth similarly noted that "I have even seen a baby swinging in a cradle, suspended from the top of a reed hut, where, owing to a flooded state of the waters, the stream was flowing, in an unimpeded current, through the hut itself. Their familiarity with water commences thus at a very early age."

Scottish explorer James Baille Fraser also highlighted how inhabiting terrain behind "thousands of canals that... render[ed] them inaccessible," the Khaza'il earned a reputation for being "fierce and independent, and extremely jealous of all strangers who approach their haunts."

To curb the Khaza'il control within the marshes, in August 1701, the Porte in Istanbul created a plan to remove the Khaza'il; Sultan Mustafa II personally financed an expeditionary force to change the direction of the Euphrates River back to its original channel passing through Rumahiyya. This was to be completed in two phases, firstly by deepening the bed of the old channel and then to dam the new channel that enabled the Khaza'il's power. On the opposite bank in Hasaka, Emir Salman Al-Khaza'il issued levies to all tribes in Iraq for all able-bodied fighting age men to mobilise against the Ottoman forces within the country, citing an impending battle. The call was heeded and Emir Salman had gathered the largest army in Iraq for generations, estimated at over 100,000 men armed with muskets, swords and lances, controlling all Arab, Iranian and Ottoman tribal forces from the city of Anah in Northern Iraq to Basra on the Southern coast. Given the population in 1800 was 1.08 million people, a military force of over 100,000, 100 years prior, would have been an immense proportion of the entire Mesopotamian population. The battle took place half an hour from Diyab on December 19th 1701 after Emir Salman and his father Emir 'Abbas ambushed the Ottomans but the rebels became terrified, outgunned by the Empire's advanced heavy weaponry including abus cannons and volley guns along with grapeshot ammunition and petard explosives. Although Emirs Salman and his father 'Abbas escaped, the Ottoman forces executed 10,000 people, imprisoning over 10,000 more, cutting off thumbs and beheading thousands of others. Late-arriving imperial forces burned tribes' homes while many died drowning in the Euphrates. The Ottomans celebrated their victory by assembling a pyramid of 1,000 mutilated heads as a warning for others and exclaiming that "the bellies of the lions, beasts, and birds became graves for their wretched corpses." Forty years later, when Jean Otter travelled through Mesopotamia, their grave mounds were still visible. The Ottomans captured Hasaka and began damming work in December lasting until March 1702, although to no success due to rising water levels. While Ottoman historians labelled the battle as a defeat for the Khaza'il because of their retreat, some Arab and contemporary historians do not.

The strategy of retreat into their marshlands was key to the Khaza'il's success. In April 1702, the Ottoman force appointed an official to Hasaka to maintain the Empire's control, before returning to Baghdad. At the end of the same month, the official sent a letter to the government in Baghdad notifying that he had surrendered after Emir Salman had returned from the marshes, outnumbering the Ottomans and re-taking Hasaka.

=== Ottoman campaigns against the kingdom ===
Compared to all other tribal powers, the Khaza'il were the most resistant to Ottoman demands, engaging in the most battles against the Ottoman Empire as the most powerful Emirate in Mesopotamia. So powerful was the military might of the Khaza'il that a contemporary author wrote of them: "Among [the tribes of Iraq] are the Khazaʿil ... Word has it they are the clouds when they pour forth, and the lions when they charge." During the 18th century alone, contemporary historians and chroniclers detailed brutal battles between the Khaza'il and Ottoman Empire in 1701, 1708, 1746, 1764, 1781, 1782, 1784, 1785 and 1787 – all were attempts by the Porte to diminish the Khaza'il's power. In the second half of the 18th century, the Ottomans sent columns of soldiers to attack the Khaza'il almost annually.

In the chapter "Battle of the Giants", Stephen Longrigg writes, "In 1705 the chief campaign was against Salman, chief of the Khaza'il, who had been joined by parties of Shammar and 'Anizah, had looted Baghdad villages and threatened Hillah. His army was not a horde; the rudiments of an administration marked his rapid expansion." When the Ottoman governor Hasan Pasha reached Hasaka with the imperial army, the Khaza'il were nowhere in sight; they had fled through the marshes to Basra, the stronghold of the Muntafiq and a power base of the Khaza'il alike which the Khaza'il and Muntafiq would later rule in coalition together in the late 18th century. As the Ottomans could not defeat an alliance between the Khaza'il and Muntafiq, who had again assembled an army of around 100,000 warriors, the governor returned to Baghdad and three years later in 1708, assembled a force of 50,000 soldiers to march to Basra to fight the allied Emirates. When the Ottomans arrived in Basra, the Khaza'il and Muntafiq fighters had barricaded themselves between the marshes of the 'Antar River, a tributary of the Euphrates. As the Ottomans could not fight on this terrain, they dammed the 'Antar River with huge pieces of wood, carried by 50 soldiers each, using ropes on both sides of the river. Once completed, the battle was fierce lasting for several weeks; the Khaza'il and Muntafiq dispersed at night but ultimately the Ottomans could not subjugate the tribes, a victory for the Emirates.

In spring 1746, the main campaign was against the Khaza'il under Emir Hamad al Hamud. 'Ali Pasha's Ottoman forces achieved no success and were so significantly defeated that songs of victory by the marshland Khaza'il reached both the general population of Baghdad as well as the Ottoman Court.

In 1764, the first year of the new Ottoman governor to Baghdad, 'Umr Pasha launched an expedition against the Khaza'il. The Ottomans destroyed their stronghold in Lamlum, appointed their own Sheikh and decapitated other Khaza'il leaders. The Emir of Khaza'il Hamud escaped and eventually returned on empty promises to cease resistance against the Ottoman Empire.

In 1780, the Sublime Porte appointed Büyük Süleyman Pasha (r. 1780–1802) as Ottoman Governor of Iraq, however, he faced the most powerful and formidable leader in the history of the Khaza'il, Emir Hamad bin Hamud (d. 1799). Emir Hamad restored the Khaza'il's power in Hasaka and fervently challenged the authority of the Ottoman Empire, countering the centralisation efforts of Büyük Pasha. In the first months of his Governorship, he led an expedition against the Khaza'il in an attempt to subdue them. The expedition was described by J. Baillie Fraser as an effort to "teach these amphibious savages to know their masters." As soon as Ottoman forces approached the Khaza'il Dirah (territory), the tribesmen destroyed the reed dams flooding the plain and barricaded themselves within their marshes. As this made it unable for Ottoman forces to advance or fight, the Governor ordered the rivers to be dammed. Contemporary Sunni cleric Othman al-Basri described the constructed dam as the Great Wall that kept Biblical and Quranic figures Gog and Magog at bay. Two months following the damming project, the Khaza'il were starved of water for their livestock and agricultural production. Stephen Longrigg describes this event:

"In the middle Euphrates column after column was dispatched almost annually against the Khaza'il. A few months sufficed to show that hopes of better security in this region were vain. Hamad ul Hamud, the Khaza'il Shaikh, refused all control, scorned all orders. The sight of military preparations, and a final warning, did not avail: Sulaiman led out his forces, met and routed the tribal army. Shaikh Hamad replied by cutting the dykes; and the mud-islanded waste of reedy water that resulted was no possible theatre for a campaign. The Pasha countered with a remarkable feat, closed the breaches upstream and let the floods subside. Advance was now possible. Hamad fled west of the Euphrates. In the end, arrears of taxation were collected, indemnity levied, pardon and peace bestowed."

As written by John Gordon Lorimer, in 1843, the Ottoman Administration dispatched a military expedition against the Khaza'il "in their lagoons on the Euphrates" and in 1844, "an island fortress of the Khaza'il was taken and a Turkish garrison installed in it."

=== Control of Basra ===
Historically, the Khaza'il, Muntafiq and Albu Muhammad tribes dominated Basra; the Mamluk Pashas of Basra had little to no influence and were largely dictated to by the Emirs of these tribal confederations. In 1775, during the Ottoman–Persian Wars, the Persians had allied with the Khaza'il against the Muntafiq, Bani Khalid and the Ottomans under Suleiman Agha, besieging the city of Basra. By spring 1776, the poorer classes of Basra were starving and extremely poor, selling everything they owned for bread. The Pasha in Baghdad had abandoned Basra and sent a letter advising surrender so in April 1776, Suleiman Agha surrendered. When the Persians entered, there was no disorder allowed with a garrison of 6000 soldiers placed within the city. Although beginning a pleasant rule, the Persians under Karim Khan and his brother quickly began oppressing the poor through enforced military service while the wealthy classes expropriated money from the poorest. The Arab tribes were seen as the only saviour – the Khaza'il merely respected than obeyed the very few demands placed by the Khan. In early 1779, the Karim Khan withdrew from Basra with his forces, unable to sustain his occupation, returning to Persia. The government of Basra now solely belonged to the tribal notables, releasing Suleiman Agha. By July 1780, Basra had returned to the nominal control of the Ottomans.

In 1785, the Khaza'il under Emir Hamad bin Hamud allied with the Muntafiq, captured Az Zubayr, a city on the south-eastern outskirts of Basra city, imprisoning the Ottoman Mutasallim Ibrahim Beg. This extended into Basra the following day which was taken without disorder. The Ottoman Naval captains were arrested and their property confiscated – Arab tribal coalition government returned.

=== Wahhabi attacks ===
During the first decade of the 19th century, the Wahhabi movement of religious Sunni fundamentalists, allied with the Al Saud family began attacking the Shia shrine cities of Najaf and Karbala, along with attacking caravans in their conquest for expansion into Mesopotamia from Nejd. The Khaza'il were a primary line of defence in Iraq, having had their pilgrims attacked near Najd by "fanatic" Wahhabis. On one occasion, the Khaza'il attacked incoming forces heading to Najaf while invading Najd to counter-attack. The Wahabbi incursions into Mesopotamia were one of rare times the Khaza'il allied with the Ottomans in repelling a common enemy.

== Armoury and fortresses ==
=== Weapons and military size ===
The Khaza'il were known for the vast size of their army which could reach at its peak 100,000 warriors and 30,000 cavalry. Tribesmen were armed with an array of swords, spears and muskets although the Khaza'il did possess several cannons but these were used more out of curiosity, taken from victories against the Ottoman Empire.

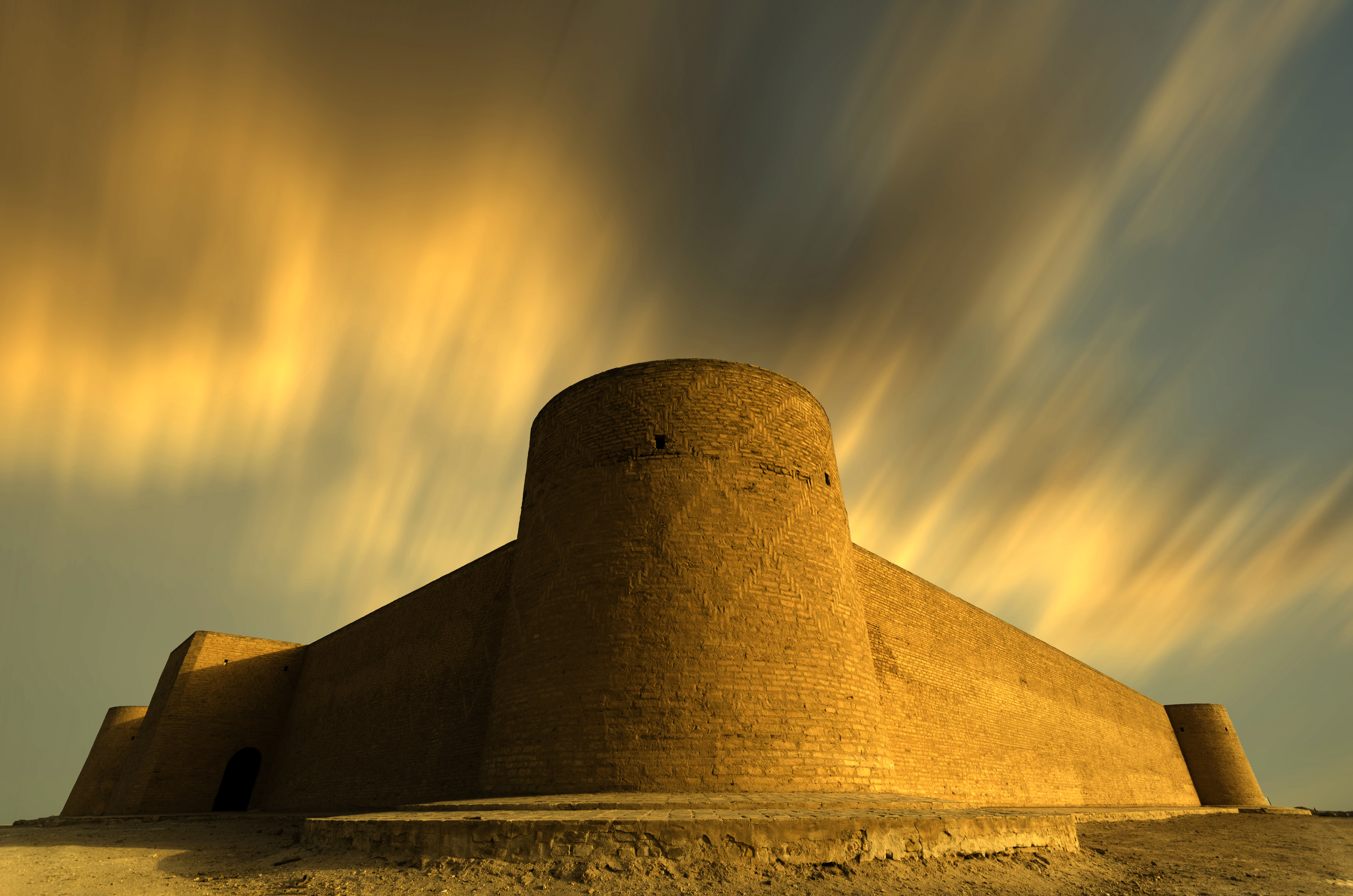
Zarb Castle named after Emir Dhirb Al Khaza'i, in Al Diwaniyah.

=== Fortresses ===
The Khaza'il were also infamous for the significant number of fortresses they owned including Zarb Castle named after Emir Dhirb bin Mughamis Al Khuza'i which still stands in Al Diwaniyah today; Al Diwaniyah itself was established by the Khaza'il family and was formerly known as Khaza'il's Diwaniyah (Khaza'il's Guest House).

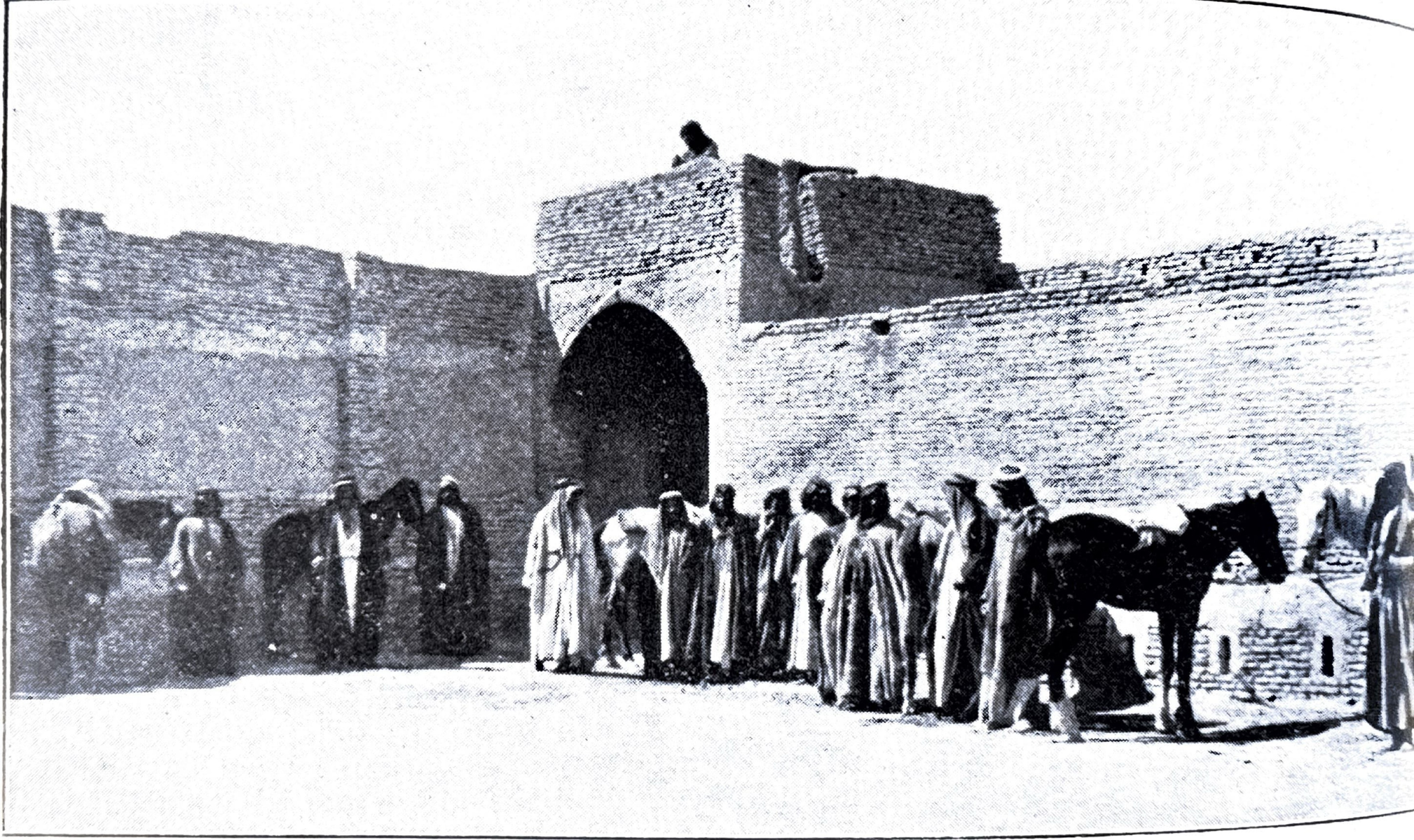
Ruhabah Castle around 1920, titled by author James Saumarez Mann; "RUHABAH: DESERT ARABS (Arab recruits for the Native Police: sentry in watch tower.)"

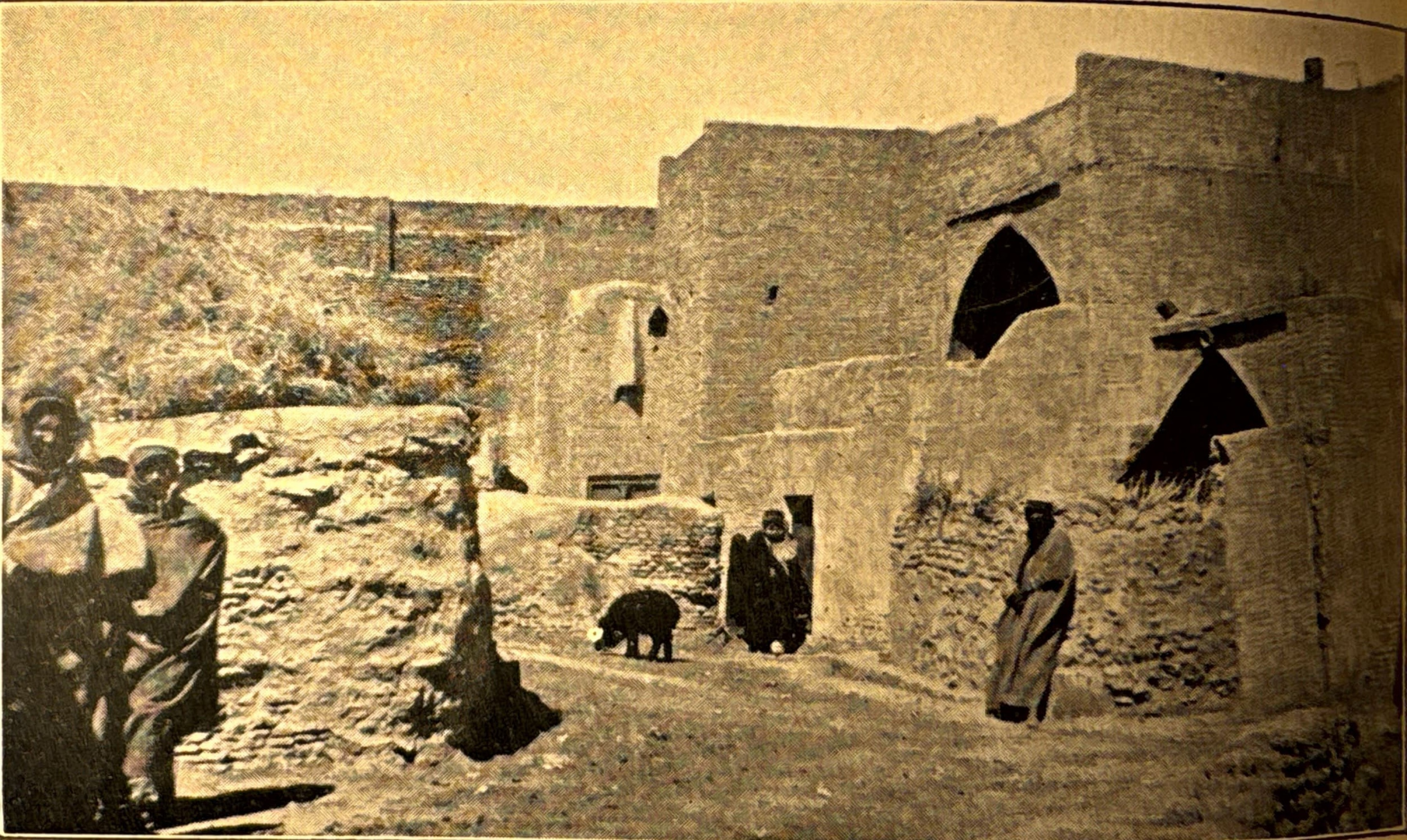
Ruhabah Castle around 1920, titled by author James Saumarez Mann; "Inside the Khan at Ruhabah. (A relic of Khaza'il greatness: possibly much older.)"

Other castles belonging to the Khaza'il include fortresses around Lamlum, the most important being Al Salman Castle at the northern edge of a great marsh, ruling 20,000 inhabitants in the 1820s as well as Rumahiyya Fortress, previously established by the Ottomans. Ruhabah Castle, described by British Administrator James Saumarez Mann as a "relic of Khaza'il greatness" was a fortress built by the Khaza'il around the 16th or 17th century, around 20 miles south-west of the Shia shrine city of Najaf. Although now only ruins remain, the castle was an important point for tribespeople such as Shammar and Anizah Bedouins from Ha'il and Hejaz acting as a marketplace for grain and vegetables from Najaf. It is also famous as the site of the historical battleground of the Islamic Battle of Al Qadisiyyah. In November 2024, researchers conclusively found the battle site with the ruins of the fortress.

== Wealth ==
The ruling Khaza'il dynasty were renowned as the wealthiest family in the Mesopotamian region and one of the wealthiest in Arabia during the 17th, 18th and 19th centuries due to their vast land ownership, monopoly on Mesopotamia's agricultural industry (the primary wealth source of the period), and their extensive tax systems along the Silk Road. Based on reported taxation rarely paid by the Khaza'il to the Ottoman Empire as ransom payments, their estimated wealth would be the equivalent to a present-day multi-billion dollar/pound dynasty with political power. Beyond these reported payments, the Khaza'il were "entirely absolved from revenue."

=== Agriculture ===
The Khaza'il were the largest rice, wheat and barley suppliers in Mesopotamia, selling enormous quantities primarily to Baghdad but also to Bedouin tribes in Ha'il, modern day Saudi Arabia, through their fortress in Ruhabah. Heads of the Khaza'il would appoint representatives for each tribe in their Emirate to manage the rice production in their respective districts. One estimate from 1800 suggests that the Khaza'il rice fields began at the Euphrates and extended up to 40 miles inland. In terms of cultivatable land, the entire Western Euphrates from Suq-al-Shuyukh to Hit belonged to the Khaza'il.

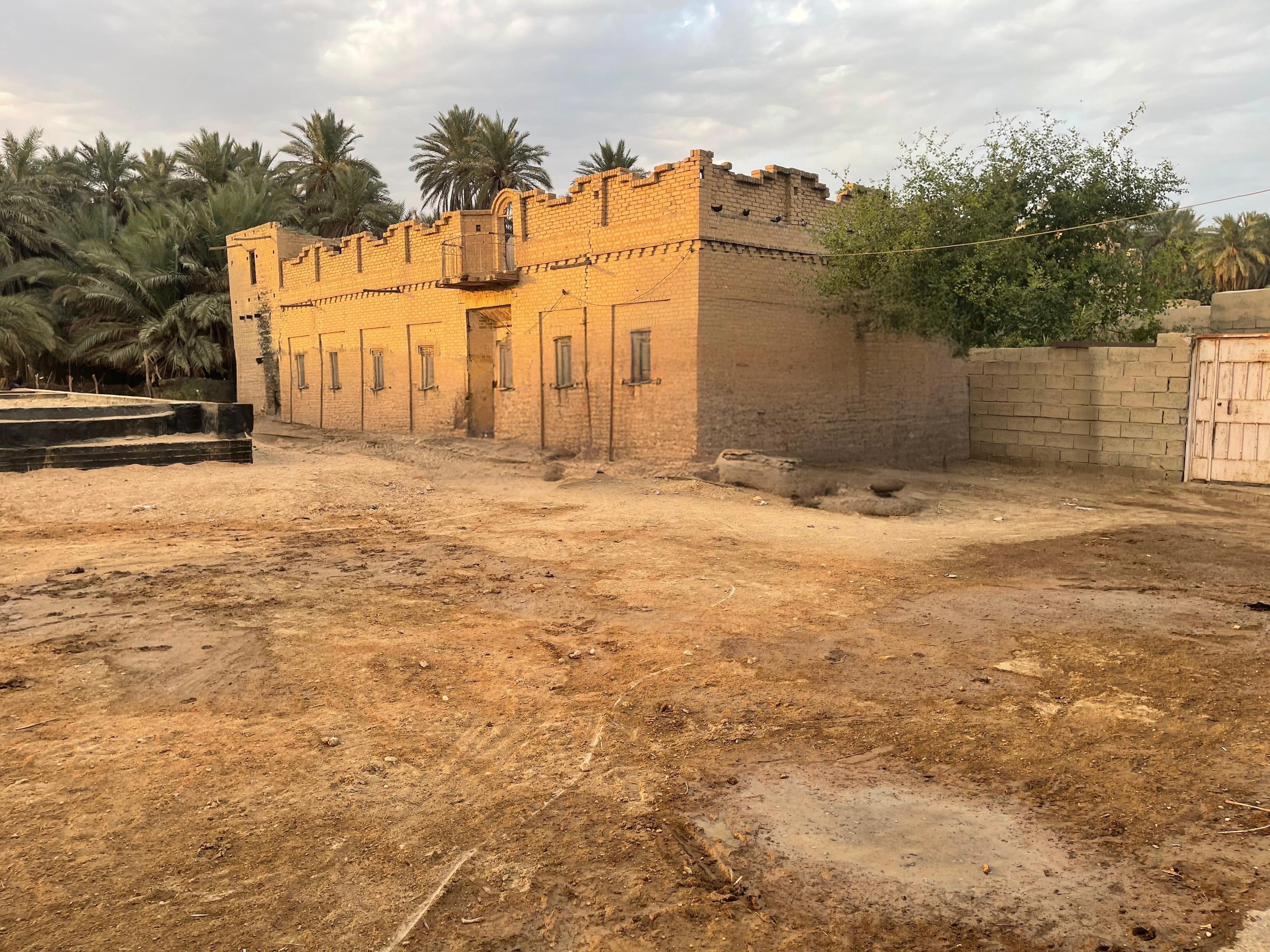
The remains of Emir Sharmahi's former palace in the suburbs of Al Diwaniyah.

In 1795, the Khaza'il bought off an Ottoman siege of their Kingdom with a ransom payment of 70,000 sheep and 700 water buffalo. These animals were very expensive due to their supply of milk products, wool and meat and indicate the vast number of additional animals owned by the Khaza'il in the hundreds of thousands.

=== Taxation ===
In August 1855, the Ottoman Governor in Baghdad Reşit Pasha claimed that tax arrears reached £52,794 in Hindiya, £18,145 in Diwaniyah, £14,362 in Hillah, and £25,098 in Samawah. At the time, these areas were under the reign of the Khaza'il. Using a GBP-based model, the total tax arrears of £110,399 in 1855 would be equivalent to an estimated £410 million in 2024:

- UK GDP in 1855: ~£700 million.
- UK GDP in 2023: ~£2.6 trillion.
- Growth factor = 2,600 ÷ 0.7 = 3,714×.

Calculation: £110,399 × 3,714 ≈ £410 million.

The total tax arrears reported by Ottoman Pashas from 1847–1855 in these same districts was 23,151,418.373 kuruş. The average conversion rate was ~110 kuruş to 1 pound in 1850s. The pound amount is £210,467. Therefore, the total unpaid tax arrears claimed by the Ottoman Empire, in 8 years for these four districts under Khaza'il rule, using the GDP-based model is £782 million in 2024. In the same period from 1847–1855, the Ottomans claimed 4730 tagars of wheat and 6919 tagars of barley were owed for military purposes; a Tagar is equal to 1025.6 kilograms.

Other reported ransom payments include July 1813 when the Emir paid 100,000 piasters plus an unspecified load of rice. In September 1813 a rival Sheikh offered 160,000, and after a defeat by the government they had to pay 200,000 piasters and 2,000 tagars of rice. In July 1819, after a new defeat, the Khaza'il rulers were forced to pay 250,000 piasters and 10,000 tagars of rice (with an equivalent value of 2.4 million piasters), taken by Dawud Pasha as booty. In 1816, the exchange rate between the British Pound Sterling and Ottoman Kuruş (Piaster) was £1 : 19 kuruş. Totalling 3.59 million piasters including price equivalents of tagars, this equates to an estimated British Pound value of £188,947. Given Britain's estimated GDP in 1819 of £430 million, in modern terms (2023), using the GDP-based model, the estimated value in 2023 of accumulated Khaza'il payments in 1813 and 1819 is £1,142,562,509 (£1.14bn).

=== Silk road tolls ===
The Khaza'il Sheikhs also established tolling stations along the Euphrates River and on the main land routes; the Euphrates was the main river connecting Basra to Baghdad as the Tigris was longer and thus more expensive, while the land routes connected Basra to Aleppo, Damascus and eventually onto Europe. As Iraq sits in the centre of the Silk Road connecting India and Asia to Europe, the Khaza'il made enormous wealth from these taxation mechanisms. One major Khaza'il tolling station lay in Lamlūm which was destroyed by the Ottoman Empire in 1765. Other river-based tolling stations included Rumahiyya and Samawah, with control extended to the Shatt al-Arab. The importance of these trade routes is demonstrated when the Khaza'il threatened caravans or denied access through their territory in the late 18th century; the British Empire through William Digges La Touche, the East India Company's Secret Committee representative to Basra, supplied the Ottoman Pasha in Baghdad with 300 muskets and 20 pairs of pistols via the Mercury Ship to bolster the armed response against the "Ghesaal Arabs" (Khaza'il), in 1781. The Pasha also noted his need of 50,000 piasters to build two armed galleons to protect the Basra trade routes from the Khaza'il.

== Shiism and the Breakdown of the Ottoman Empire ==
Despite the Ottoman Empire's eventual short-term success in breaking the power of the Khaza'il in the mid-19th century, the successive rebellions and persistent resistance of the Khaza'il over four centuries is credited by scholars as the primary cause in the disintegration of the Ottoman Empire in Iraq and the wider region.

The Khaza'il's power as the strongest Emirate in Iraq was largely established due to their dependence on the Euphrates river channels, providing food security, fertile land for animal husbandry and areas inaccessible to Ottoman forces. In a bid to diminish the Khaza'il's power, successive Ottoman Governments over two centuries tampered with the natural flowing Euphrates River waterways, severely degrading the main channel (Hillah Channel). Due to the immense silt load of the Euphrates (four–five times more than the Nile River), by the 1850s, the Hillah Channel ceased to be the Euphrates' main waterway, shifting to the Hindiyya Canal, completed in 1793, that brought water to the Shia shrine city of Najaf. Although this led to the Khaza'il abandoning some of their historic cities, it had a major impact in consolidating Shiism as the majority religion in Iraq. Prior to the increased water flows, Najaf was struggling to develop due to its water scarcity, and the majority of tribal confederations were Sunni (except a few such as the Khaza'il). The increased water to Najaf and Karbala led to mass conversion to Shiism in Iraq with the revived shrine cities having greater economic resources to establish education centres, increase capacity, and send 'missionaries' to tribal areas. Having badly suffered under the Sunni Ottoman Governments, most tribes saw Shiism as a form of Islam centring on anti-tyranny, leading to their conversion.

Resultantly, while the fundamental power of the Khaza'il had been broken, the Ottoman Empire had created a Shia problem. This undermined the legitimacy of the Ottoman Sultans who tried to establish themselves as the pan-Islamic Caliphs of Islam, uniting the tribes against them. Once the British Administration arrived during WW1, they were too weak to defeat both tribal and British forces together, leading to the end of their 383 year conquest of Iraq.

== Disintegration into Iraqi state ==
The immense power of the Khaza'il was eventually broken by the Ottoman Empire from around the 1860s-1870s due to a multi-layered strategy that involved damming their waterways, pitting Sheikhs against each other and introducing rival tribes and extraneous Sayyids to steal Khaza'il land. Despite this diminishment, the Khaza'il remained the largest and most influential confederation in the Middle Euphrates even up to their integration into the Iraqi state.

=== Damming Khaza'il rivers ===
Over the course of two centuries of Ottoman damming efforts against the Khaza'il, the water flow of the Euphrates River changed from the historic main channel (Hillah Branch) to a new canal established in 1793 that ran further West along Najaf (Hindiyyah Channel). This caused the drying up of the Khaza'il marshlands and certain agricultural areas. Feeling the effects of water scarcity, the Khaza'il scattered along different water channels, abandoning the marshes of Lamlūm and Hasaka in the 1830s, with a view to returning once the water-way returned to its original channel. Archaeologist William Loftus on his journey to the Middle Euphrates in 1849–1850 noted the "deserted cities ... ruined mud houses among the surrounding date groves" and river channels that "must formerly have been of considerable importance." By the 1880s, the Hillah branch had completely dried up, undermining the agricultural power of the Khaza'il who relied on it substantially for wealth generation.

=== Introducing rival tribes and foreign sayyids ===
The migration of the Khaza'il closer to more sustainable water sources created a golden opportunity for the Ottoman Empire to introduce rival tribes and foreign Sayyids to the Khaza'il areas, in a bid to reduce their control over their territory. The smaller Fatlah tribe, historically under Khaza'il overlordship who farmed some of their land to them, was brought to the Mishkhāb, gradually gaining control of other smaller tribes and separating Shamiyah tribes from their ruling Khaza'il Sheikhs. The Bani 'Ardh of the Chabshah, the Bani Zuraij and Majawir of the 'Aqrah tribe were brought to the Shatt al Hillah, driving the Khaza'il out from their land. The Bani Hasan, also previously under Khaza'il rule was given Kufa, Hor al-Dukhn and Salachiyah. The Al Zaiyad tribe who cultivated land in Samawah owned by the Khaza'il claimed it as their own. From 1880, the Dulaim tribe settled between Anah and Fallujah, historically the cultivatable land of the Khaza'il. In the same period the Zubeid tribe took areas around Hillah. The Shibl tribe, Al Ibrahim and Ghazalat, who had been tenant farmers on the Khaza'il lands no longer had allegiance, claiming the Khaza'il land as their own. The Al 'Ajib, Al Dhawalim and Albu Hassan took lands in Rumaithah. The Al Sufran, Jawabir , Al Muhsin, Al 'Abas, Al Barkat and Al Tobah took territory in Samawah. The Al 'Ayyash, Bani Salamah, Khafajah, Albu Saqir and Albu Hulail of the Dhafir claimed Khaza'il lands in Shinafiyah. Some of these tribes had previously resided in Khaza'il territory, given permission by the Sheikhly house on condition that they farm the land and contribute tribesmen against the Ottomans when necessary. British Administrator and Intelligence Officer Gertrude Bell described this process in an address to the British Parliament in 1920:

"The Turks, through the medium of Saiyid Hadi Muqotar, a member of a wealthy family of Saiyid landowners whose estates lie in and near Shinafiyah, had fomented ancient jealousies among the tribes. The Ottoman Government had always feared the authority of the Khaza'il Shaikhs, and partly by treachery towards the chiefs, partly by claiming their lands as crown property and settling other tribes more amenable to Ottoman control—such as the Fatlah—on these estates, the ruling family had been weakened and its influence curtailed...The Turks had encouraged on the two branches of the Hindiyah (for the channel sub-divides below Kifl, to reunite in the Shinafiyah marshes) the settlement of purely agricultural tribes, more amenable to their authority than the half-nomadic Khaza'il."

Along with rival tribes, the Ottoman Empire introduced foreign Sayyids who were closely allied to the Turks to take the Khaza'il land. Once on their land, Sayyids would employ various clans to work on their estate, dividing the tribesmen from their parent unit to have allegiance to the Sayyid family, undermining the cohesiveness of the confederation and weakening the power of the Emir. The use of Sayyids in particular was also due to their belief that the Khaza'il, as religious Shia followers, would respect their authority as those who claimed descent from Muhammad and would not engage them militarily. Some individuals exploited this further to falsely claim descent from Muhammad on the sole basis of potential material gain through taking Khaza'il land as well as social prestige; some claimants even changed their place of birth to avoid heavy scrutiny by tribe members. The following Sayyid claimants took Khaza'il land: Abu Tabikh family (from al-Hasa), 'Abbas family (from Medina), Muqotar family (from Syria), Zuwain family (from Mecca). Declassified contemporary British Intelligence documents refer to each of these Sayyids, the land they took and their allegiances with either the Ottoman Empire or British Administration. One specific case pertains to the Abu Tabikh family who stole around 30,000 acres from the Khaza'il; British Administrator James Mann wrote:

"I went off on Friday morning on horseback to Ghammas, a ride of about eighteen miles ... and started in at once with the hearing of a famous land dispute. ... The land in dispute is about 1500 acres, and thirty years ago it belonged to a great tribe called the Khazail, who took no notice of the Turkish Government, and did not pay any taxes. In 1889 the Turks decided to do something, so they sold the land, with an enormous amount besides—probably 30,000 acres in all—for a nominal sum to a rich man called Saiyid Hasan who stood well with them, on his promising to pay the necessary taxes. The whole business was accompanied by amazing bribery and fraud, and the deeds of sale are so fatuous as to be entirely invalid. But the Turks provided troops to push out the tribes, and Saiyid Hasan managed to get possession and cultivate a great part of the land. Of the particular piece now under dispute, however, he never got possession, and the Khazail people remained in occupation. Saiyid Hasan in due time died, and in 1904 his son, Saiyid Mohsin Abu Tabikh, inherited the property. He ... could not endure the presence of these tribesmen on land for which he held his father's deeds. He twice obtained Turkish troops to drive them out, and was once successful, so that in 1910 he managed to grow some crops on the land. But back they came, and there they have stayed until this day. In 1918 Saiyid Mohsin petitioned the British to reinstate him, and the A.P.O. of those days (since deceased) rather unfortunately took his deed at its face value, and ordered possession to be given him. The order was not completely carried out, and there has been constant trouble: and a few months ago suspicions were raised about the validity of the deeds (which are of course in Turkish), and they were sent to Baghdad for investigation. Needless to say, they were pronounced wholly worthless."

Other individuals also took advantage of this system of land redistribution in the Khaza'il domain. The Sarkis family of Baghdad were granted 200,000 donums in Nasiriyah by the Ottomans, the Menahem Daniel and Al Milli families 'purchased' land owned by the Khaza'il in Shamiyah, fraudulently registered by the Ottomans. Sultan Abdul Hamid II also took large areas in the Khaza'il territory; it is estimated he took one third of Iraq's cultivatable land, the majority of which belonged to the Khaza'il house.

=== Ottoman assassinations ===
The Ottoman Empire also conducted a series of assassinations on powerful members of the Khaza'il family. The important members of the Albu Kuraidi line of Khaza'il were wiped out: Sheikh Dhirb was assassinated in Najaf; his son Mutlaq was killed in battle after being exiled to Constantinople and forced to fight in the Ottoman War against Russia; Sheikh Dhirb's other son Sufuq was imprisoned in Constantinople; Sheikh Dhirb's grandson Mit'ab was poisoned in Mosul.

=== Integration into Iraqi state ===
The final Khaza'il King, His Majesty Emir Sharmāhi and the other primary Sheikhs of the Emirate accepted the implementation of King Faisal I al-Hashemi with the encouragement of the British Administration following their involvement in the Iraq Revolt in 1920. Although this formally transferred their sovereign power to the new Iraqi monarch, the Khaza'il family remain influential in Iraq and the Middle East to the present-day. Their continuing authority amongst tribes post-integration is partly due to their heritage having come from Mecca, ranking them top of the social hierarchy.

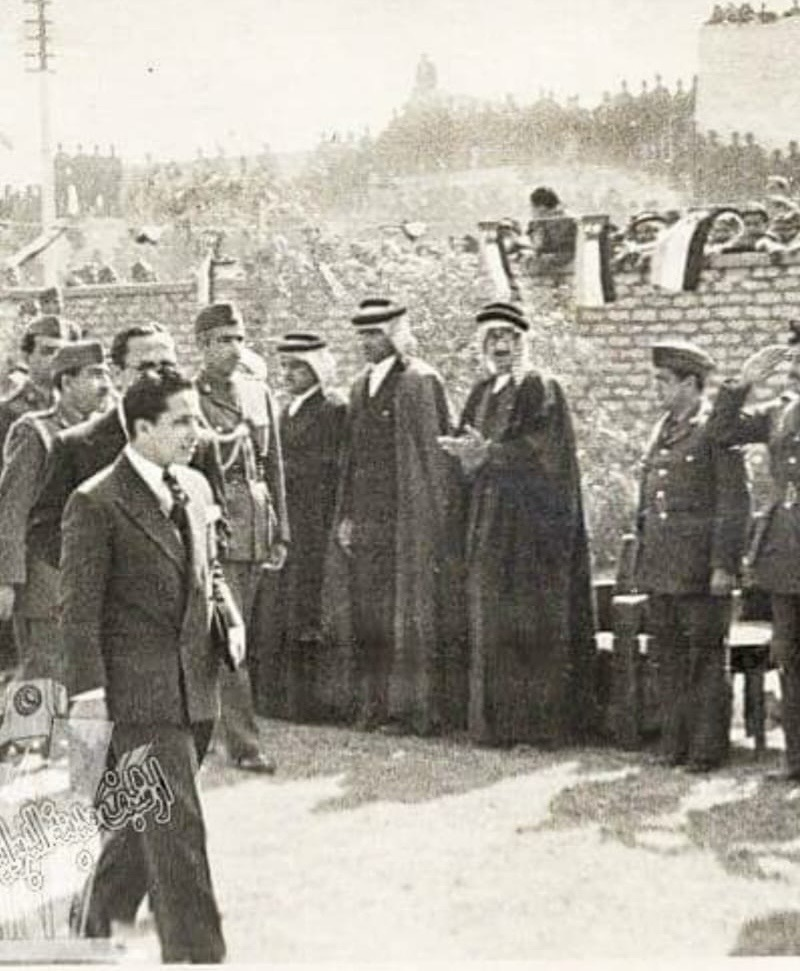
Pictured is His Highness Sheikh Abdul-Aziz bin Sharmāhi Al-Khuza'i (3rd from right), Leader of the Khaza'il tribe and son of the final King of the Middle and Lower Euphrates, Emir Sharmāhi Al-Khuza'i, meeting the Iraqi King Faisal II, following the Khaza'il submission of sovereignty to the Iraq monarchy in 1921.

== Ruling Khaza'il family ==
The Khaza'il Kingdom of the Middle and Lower Euphrates was ruled as a monarchy by the Khaza'il Royal Family, leaders of the Banu Khuza'ah tribe. The Khaza'il Emirate was different to other Arabian Emirates in that it far more closely resembled a fixed state ruled by a Monarchy. As Middle Eastern History scholar Tom Nieuwenhuis writes:

"They were tighter, more hierarchical and less latent in existence – though the riverain confederations were far from being stable political units. Of them the Khaza'il confederation and its leadership were clearly more settled than the others, and in certain aspects resembled sedentary political institutions. Their 17th century center, Imam Hamzah, took more and more the shape of a sedentary community. The shaykhs of the Khaza'il were also more bound to landed interests than most other aristocracies. According to Longrigg, the army of the Khaza'il shaykh 'was not a horde' and 'the rudiments of an administration marked his rapid expansion'. The other shaykhly aristocracies of the riverain areas usually preferred a nomadic style of life."

Although the ruler of the Khaza'il Kingdom was internationally referred to as a King, within Arab society, he was referred to as an emir and styled as sheikh. This dual title reflected both his tribal leadership and the more structured monarchical nature of the state.

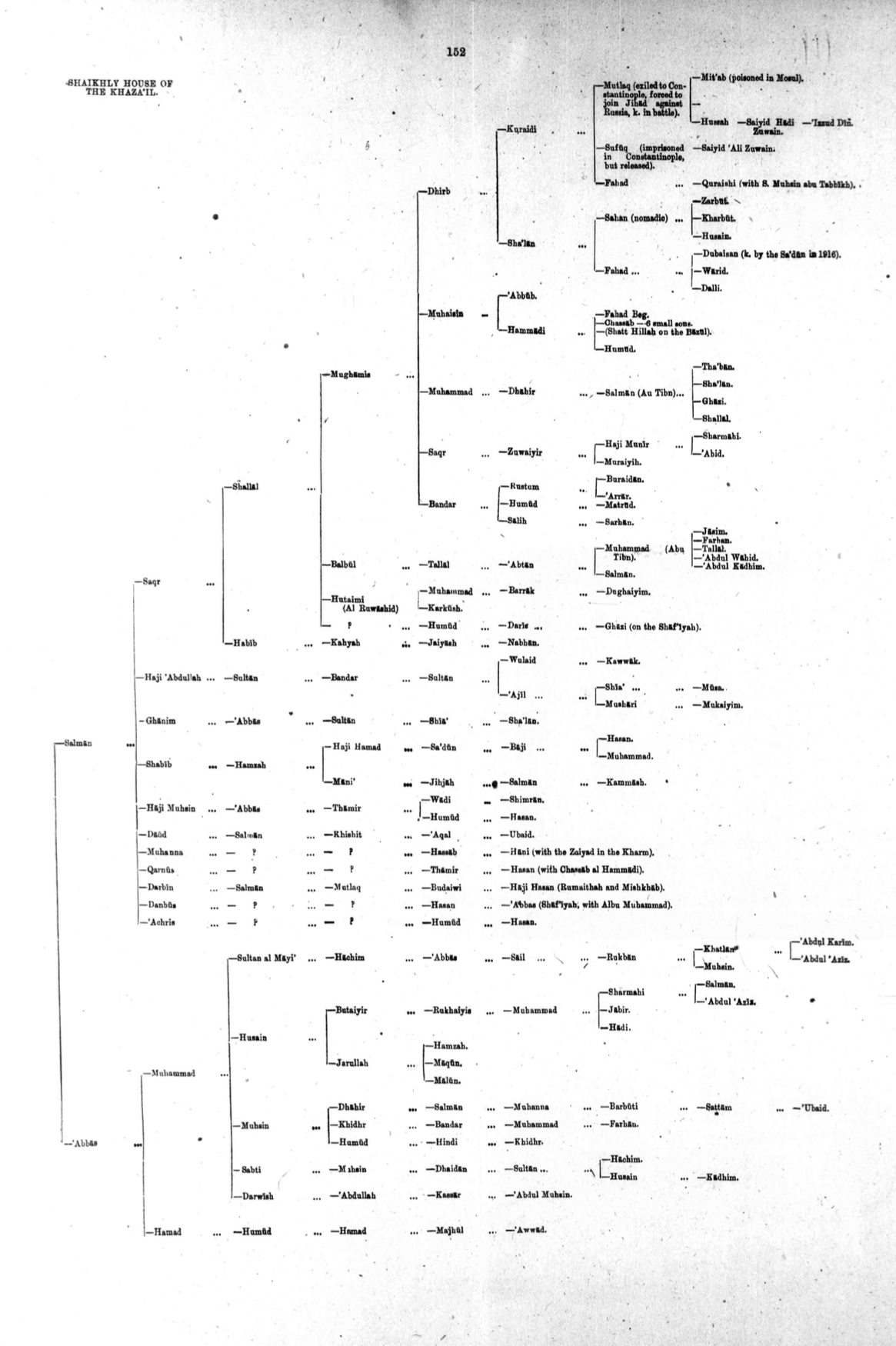
Arab Bureau-produced genealogical table of the Khaza'il Sheikhly House. Authors admit there may be errors in terms of relationships between individuals and certain names omitted – table includes errors.

Royal Succession Table
No.	Name	Reign Start	Reign End	Notes	Family
1	Nasir bin Muhanna Al Khuza'i ناصر بن مهنا الخزاعي	1604	1622	King from Najaf to Fallujah	House of Khuza'ah
2	Muhanna bin Ali Al Khuza'i مهنا بن علي الخزاعي	1622	1640	Khan of the Middle Euphrates (from Hit to Al Arjah)	House of Khuza'ah
3	Muhammad bin Muhanna Al Khuza'i محمد بن مهنا الخزاعي	1640	Unknown	Leader of the Khaza'il tribe	House of Khuza'ah
4	Al-Abbas bin Muhammad Al Khuza'i العباس بن محمد الخزاعي	Unknown	1693	Leader of the Khaza'il tribe	House of Khuza'ah
5	Salman bin Al-Abbas Al Khuza'i سلمان بن العباس الخزاعي	1693	1724	King of the Middle and Lower Euphrates	House of Khuza'ah
6	Hamad bin Al-Abbas Al Khuza'i حمد بن العباس الخزاعي	1724	Unknown	King of the Middle and Lower Euphrates	House of Khuza'ah
7	Muhammad bin Hamad Al Khuza'i محمد بن حمد الخزاعي	Unknown	1747	King of the Middle and Lower Euphrates	House of Khuza'ah
8	Hamud bin Hamad Al Khuza'i حمود بن حمد الخزاعي	1747	1778	King of the Middle and Lower Euphrates	House of Khuza'ah
9	Hamad bin Hamud Al Khuza'i حمد بن حمود الخزاعي	1778	1799	King of the Middle and Lower Euphrates	House of Khuza'ah
10	Sebti bin Muhsin Al Khuza'i سبتي بن محسن الخزاعي	1799	1813	King of Middle and Lower Euphrates; died by drowning	House of Khuza'ah
11	Muhsin bin Ghanim Al Khuza'i محسن بن غانم الخزاعي	1799	1810	Emir of Jazirah; rivaled Emir Sebti bin Hamud. This conflict arose after Emir Hamad bin Hamud redistributed land to the Al Salman branch cousins	House of Khuza'ah
12	Salman bin Muhsin bin Ghanim Al Khuza'i سلمان بن محسن بن غانم الخزاعي	1813	1818	King of Middle and Lower Euphrates	House of Khuza'ah
13	Ghanim bin Salman Al Khuza'i غانم بن سلمان الخزاعي	1818	1821	King of Middle and Lower Euphrates	House of Khuza'ah
14	Khanjur bin Hamad bin Hamud Al Khuza'i خنجر بن حمد بن حمود الخزاعي	1818	1823	King of Middle and Lower Euphrates	House of Khuza'ah
15	Dhirb bin Mughamis Al Khuza'i ذرب بن مغامس الخزاعي	1823	1850	King of Middle and Lower Euphrates; assassinated by Ottoman Empire in Najaf	House of Khuza'ah
16	Kuraidi bin Dhirb Al Khuza'i كريدي بن ذرب الخزاعي	1850	1851	King of Middle and Lower Euphrates	House of Khuza'ah
17	Mutlaq bin Kuraidi Al Khuza'i مطلق بن كريدي الخزاعي	1851	1866	King of Middle and Lower Euphrates; exiled to Constantinople and forced to fight against Russia in Ottoman-Russia War where he was killed in battle. His son, Prince Mit'ab was poisoned by Ottoman Empire in Mosul	House of Khuza'ah
18	Sharmāhi bin Muhammad Al Khuza'i شرماهي بن محمد الخزاعي	Unknown	1921	Final King of Middle Euphrates; between Emir Mutlaq and Emir Sharmāhi, there was a rivalry before the Kingdom was dissolved. The region was later integrated into modern Iraq. His son Abdul-Aziz Al Khuza'i later became a member of the Iraqi Senate	House of Khuza'ah

Following the death of Emir Mutlaq, the Khaza'il territories split with individual Sheikhs of the main clans (branches) ruling their respective districts. Between Emir Mutlaq and Emir Sharmāhi, several cousins from the Al Salman branch of the Khaza'il rivalled for leadership of the Khaza'il Emirate over the Albu Hamad branches; these include the militarily powerful Chassàb Al Hammàdi, Salman and Muhammad Al Abtan who had received favour from the British Empire. However, Salman Al Abtan, having been very wealthy and powerful during the late 19th century, had ended impoverished due to the Ottoman distribution of Khaza'il land to rival tribes and sayyids. A similar fate of impoverishment affected much of the Al Salman branch, whereas the Albu Muhammad branch retained its wealth. This was partly due to the Ottoman Empire's limited ability to integrate rival tribes into its provinces. As a result, the Khaza'il remained a unified tribal confederation, continuing to function as an Emirate into the early 20th century. Emir Sharmāhi of the Albu Hamad branch, having retained vast sums of wealth, was able to uphold the traditional role of an open-house Sheikh, maintaining authority over all Sheikhs of the Khaza'il confederation. This allowed him to remain the final ruler of the Kingdom before its integration into the modern Iraqi state. After the Emirate's dissolution, Emir Sharmāhi's sons, His Highnesses Salman and later Abdul-Aziz, succeeded him as paramount leaders of the Khaza'il tribe. Abdul-Aziz later became a member of the Iraqi Senate, further solidifying the family's influence within the new state structure. Today, the current leader of the Khaza'il tribe is His Highness Sheikh Mohammed Al-Khouzai (Khuza'i), the son of Sheikh Abdul-Aziz.
