= Al Diwaniyah =

Al Diwaniyah ٱلدِّيوَانِيَّة
- City
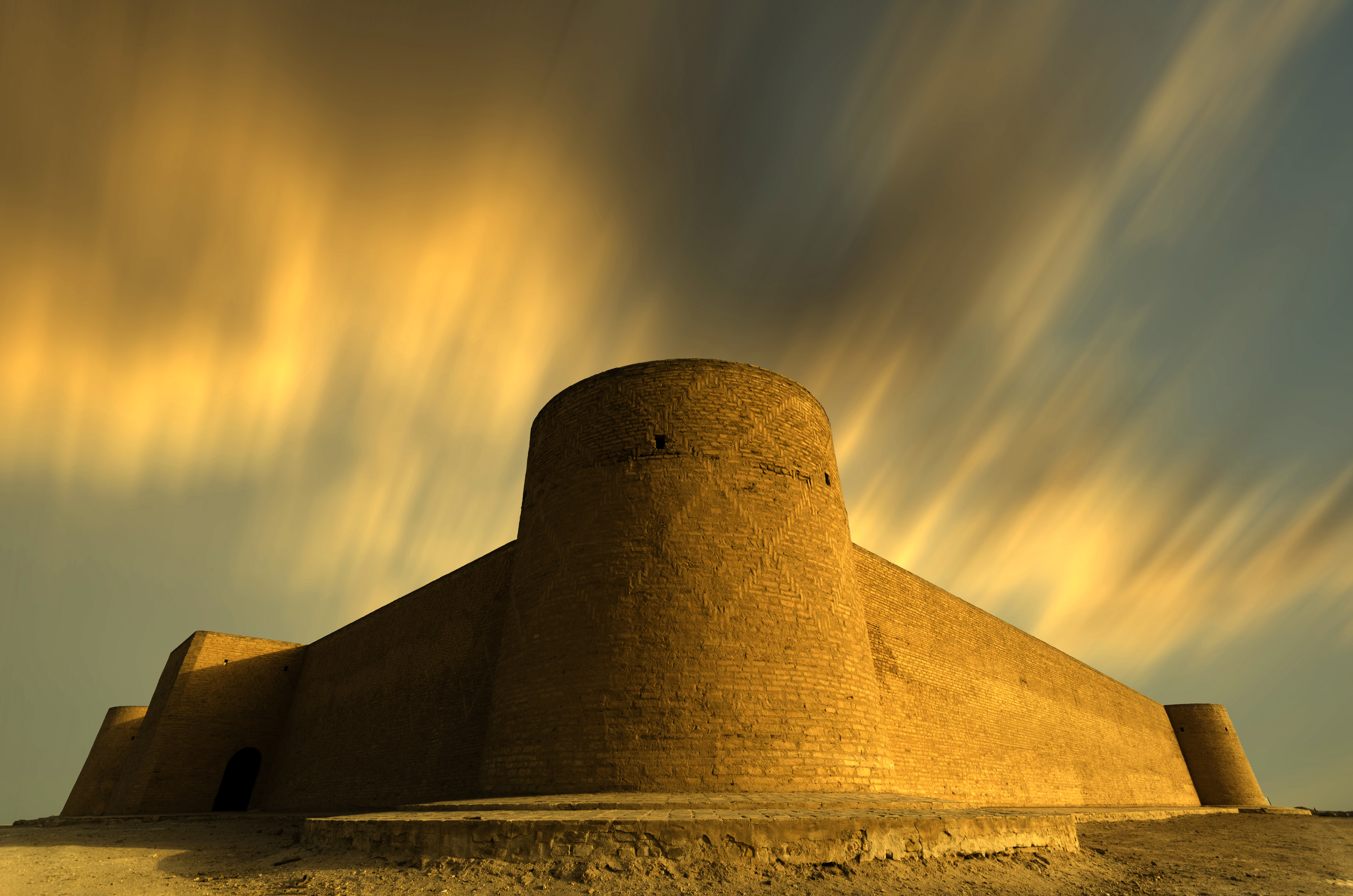
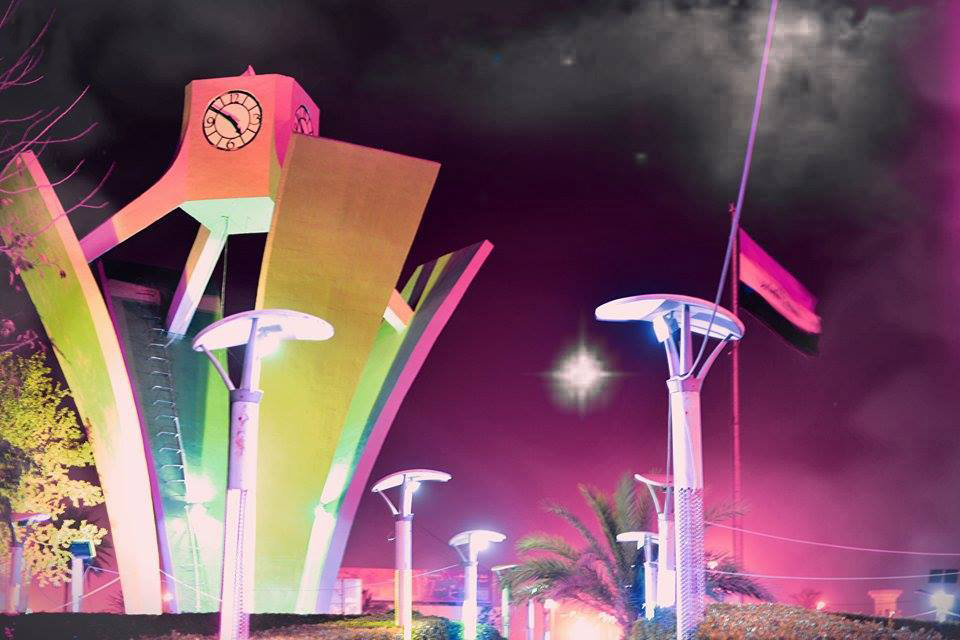
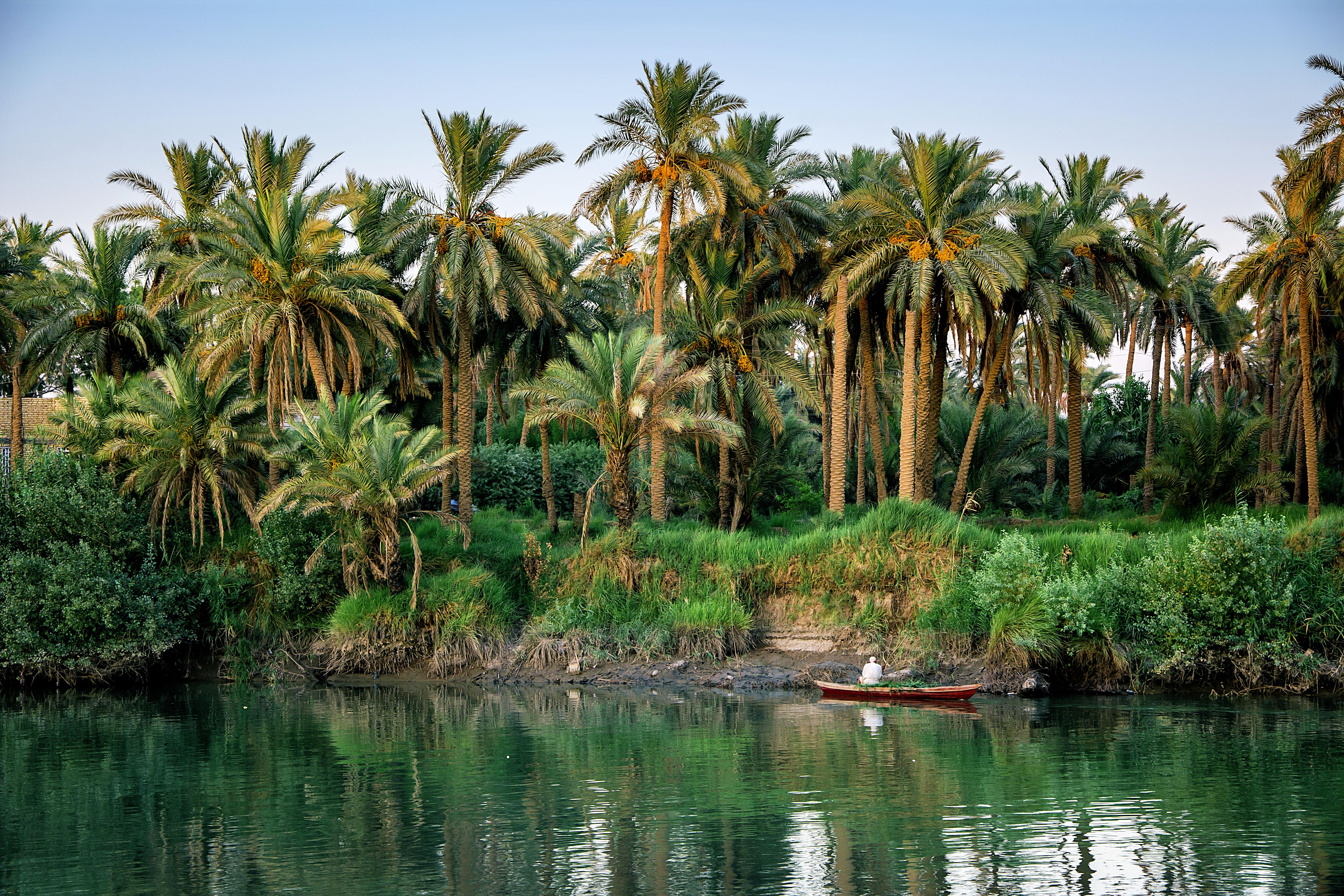
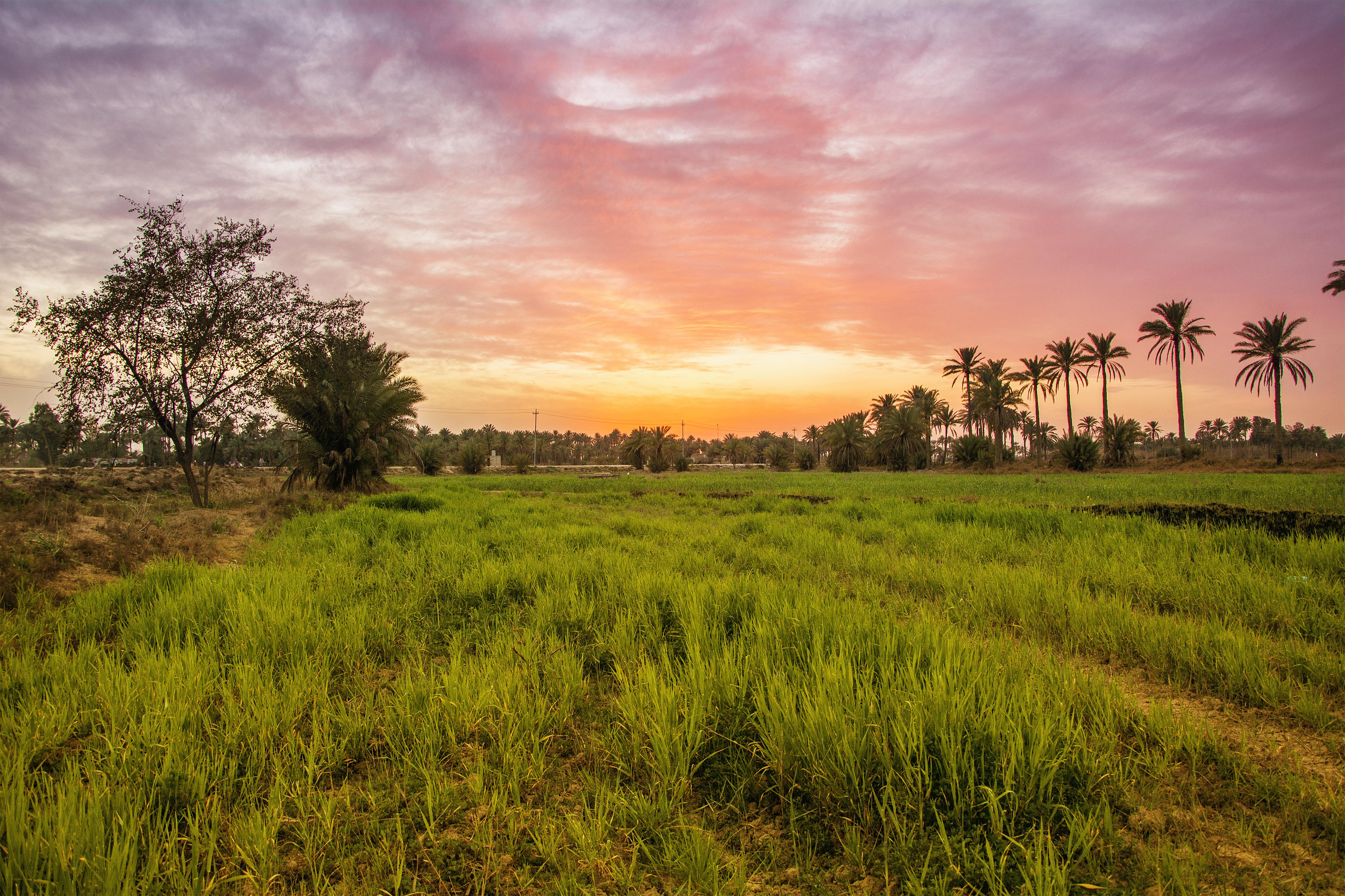

- Location within Iraq
- Coordinates: 32°00′N 45°00′E
- Country: Iraq
- Province: Al-Qādisiyyah

Population
  - Estimate (2024): 396,257

Al Diwaniyah (Arabic: ٱلدِّيوَانِيَّة ad-Dīwānīyah), also spelt Diwaniya, is the capital city of Iraq's Al-Qādisiyyah Governorate. In 2014 the population was estimated at 700,000. The city was founded by the rulers of the Khaza'il Dynasty (Banu Khuza'ah) and formally known as Khuza'ahs Diwaniyah - Khuza'ahs Guest House.

== Overview ==
The area around Al Diwaniyah, which is well irrigated from the nearby Euphrates river, is often considered to be one on the most fertile parts of Iraq, and is heavily cultivated. The town is located on the main rail transport corridor between Baghdad and Basra in south-central Iraq.

For birdwatchers, Al-Diwaniyah is a city with a rich bird list, as the city has a wide range of biodiversity. Al-Qadisiyah consists of vast agricultural areas, wetlands, arid zones, and semi-desert areas.

The city is the site of a tire manufacturing plant that once provided tires for much of Iraq. The plant is still active as of 2008.

Al-Diwaniyah is the headquarters of the Iraqi Army's 8th Division.

Fortress Zarb (Dhirb) Castle is named after Dhirb Al-Khuza'i, an Emir of the Khaza'il.

== Climate ==
Al Diwaniyah has a hot desert climate (BWh) in the Köppen–Geiger climate classification system.

Climate data for Diwaniya (1991–2020)
Month	Jan	Feb	Mar	Apr	May	Jun	Jul	Aug	Sep	Oct	Nov	Dec	Year
Mean daily maximum °C (°F)	17.7 (63.9)	20.8 (69.4)	26.0 (78.8)	32.1 (89.8)	38.4 (101.1)	42.8 (109.0)	45.3 (113.5)	44.7 (112.5)	41.4 (106.5)	35.1 (95.2)	25.0 (77.0)	19.2 (66.6)	32.4 (90.3)
Daily mean °C (°F)	11.8 (53.2)	14.3 (57.7)	19.3 (66.7)	25.0 (77.0)	31.1 (88.0)	34.9 (94.8)	36.7 (98.1)	36.2 (97.2)	33.0 (91.4)	26.9 (80.4)	18.4 (65.1)	13.4 (56.1)	25.1 (77.2)
Mean daily minimum °C (°F)	6.6 (43.9)	8.6 (47.5)	12.6 (54.7)	18.1 (64.6)	23.7 (74.7)	26.5 (79.7)	28.6 (83.5)	28.1 (82.6)	25.1 (77.2)	20.4 (68.7)	12.6 (54.7)	8.3 (46.9)	18.3 (64.9)
Average precipitation mm (inches)	23.0 (0.91)	12.0 (0.47)	11.5 (0.45)	15.8 (0.62)	2.6 (0.10)	0.0 (0.0)	0.0 (0.0)	0.0 (0.0)	0.7 (0.03)	4.9 (0.19)	24.2 (0.95)	15.2 (0.60)	109.9 (4.33)
Average relative humidity (%)	68.9	59.9	50.2	42.7	32.5	27.6	27.6	29.8	33.3	42.8	59.7	67.4	45.2
Source: NOAA

== Gallery ==
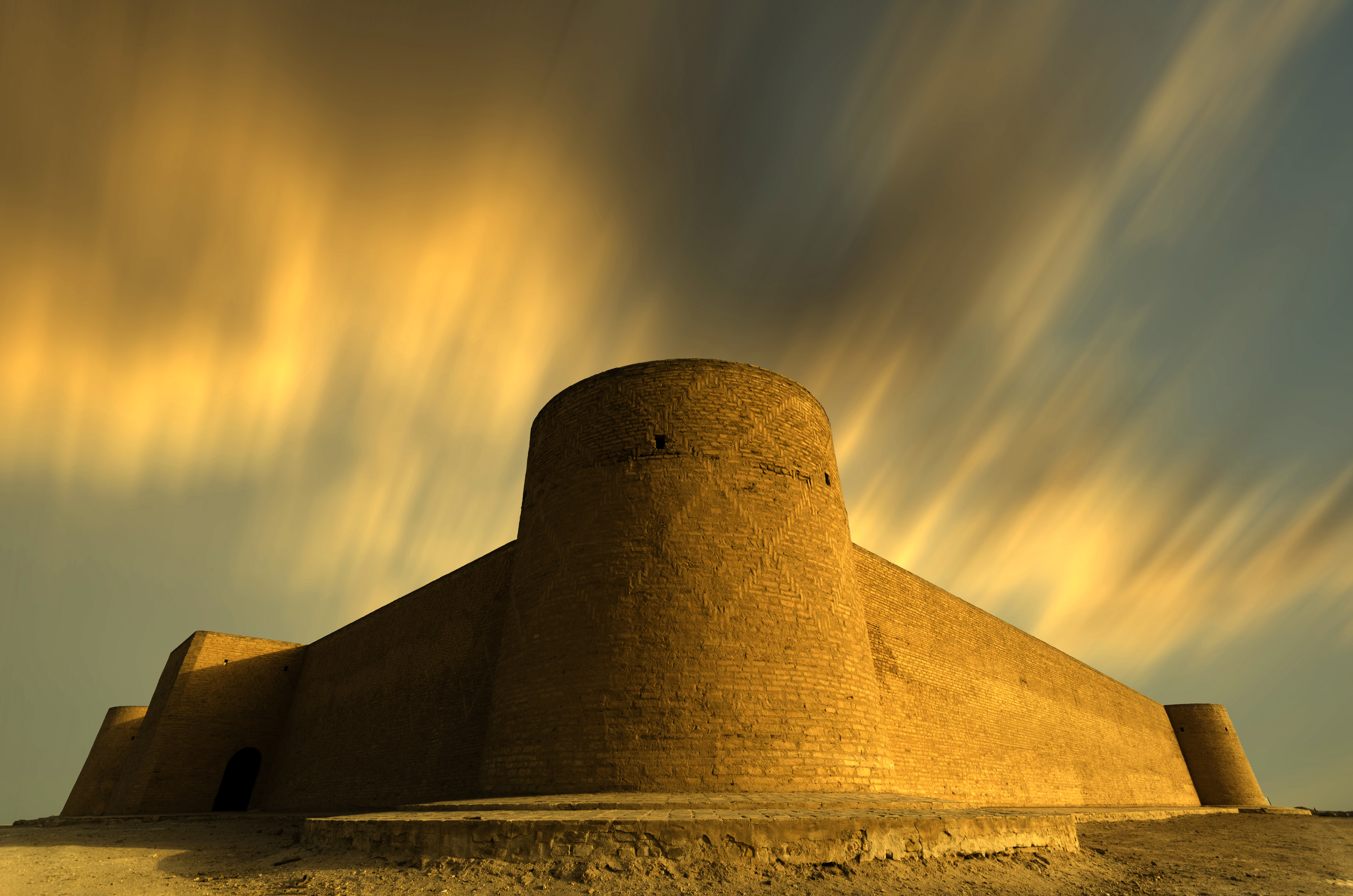
Zarb Castle

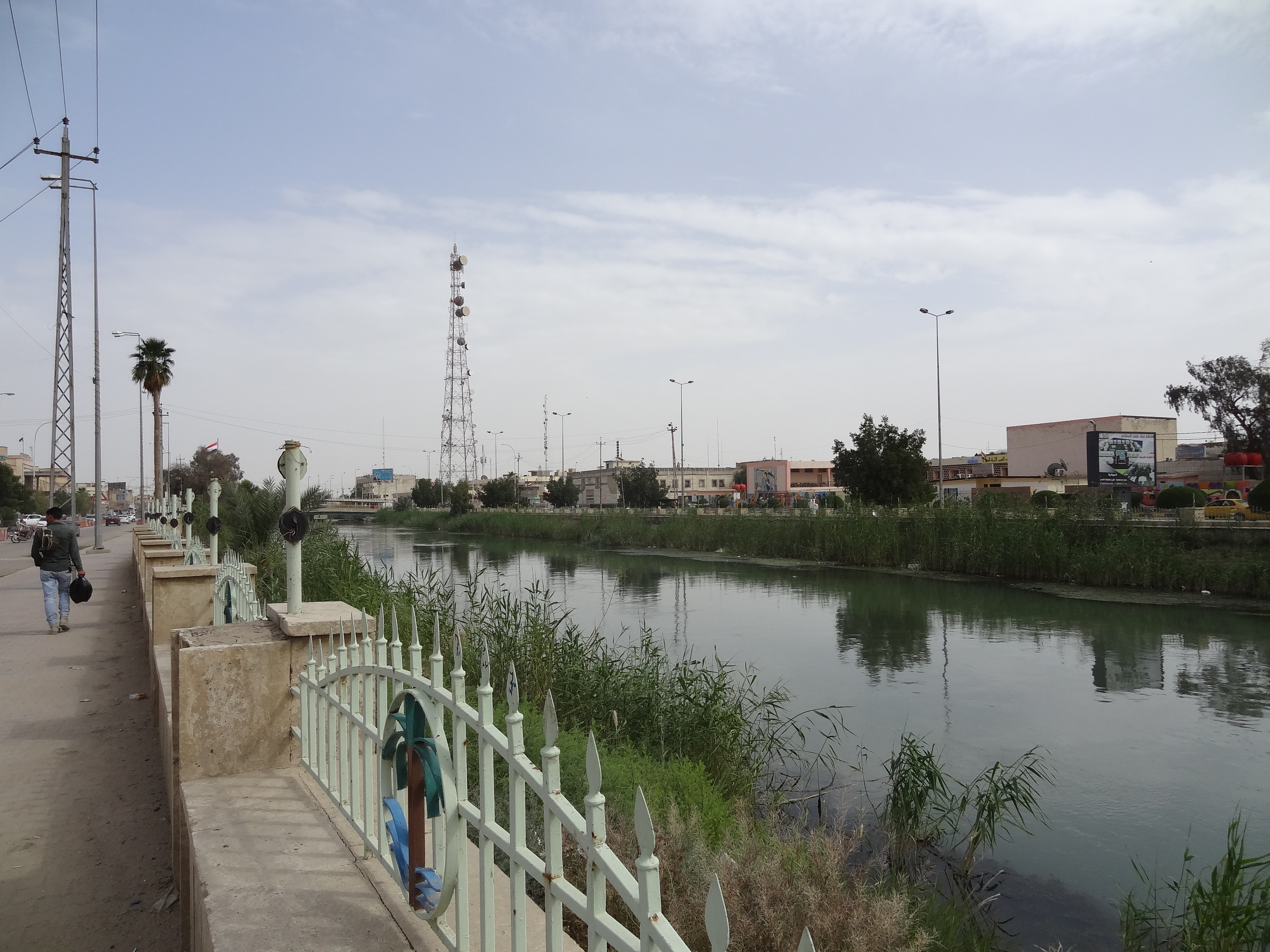
Central Al Diwaniyah

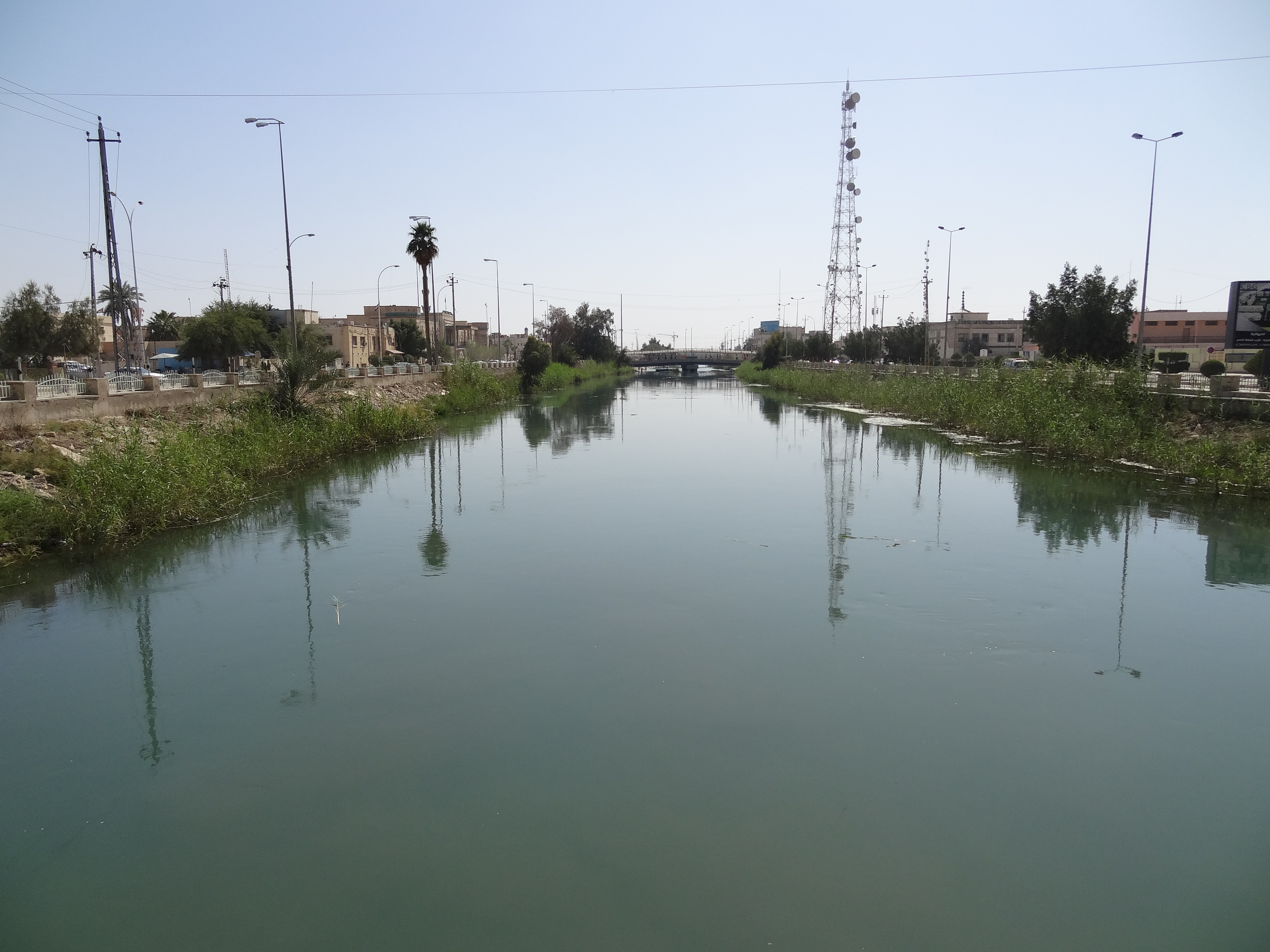
Central Al Diwaniyah

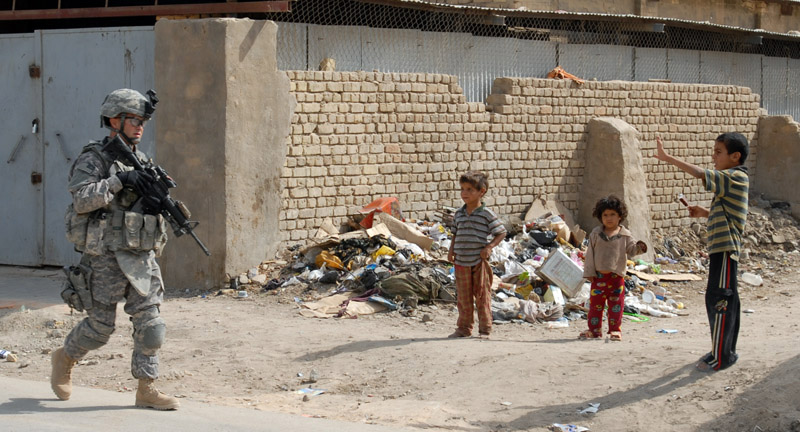
US soldier patrolling the streets of Diwaniyah

== See also ==
- List of places in Iraq
- Battle of Diwaniya
