= Lebanese Arab Army =

Former Muslim splinter faction of the Lebanese Army during the Lebanese Civil War

Lebanese Arab Army (LAA) جيش لبنان العربي
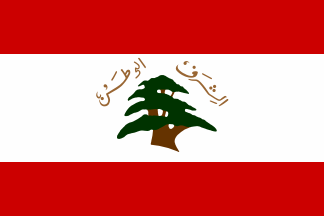
- Flag of the Lebanese Arab Army (1976-77)
- Leaders: Ahmed Al-Khatib; Ahmed Boutari; Ahmad Ma'amari; Hussein Awwad; Ghazi Ghotaymi; Youssif Mansour; Ahmad Addam; Mustafa Hamdan
- Dates active: January 1976 – February 1977
- Headquarters: Hasbaya (Southern Lebanon)
- Active regions: West Beirut, Beqaa Valley, Chouf District, Akkar District, Southern Lebanon
- Ideology: Socialism; Pan-Arabism; Arab nationalism Secularism
- Political position: Left-wing
- Status: Disbanded
- Size: 5,000 men
- Part of: Lebanese National Movement
- Wars: Lebanese Civil War

The Lebanese Arab Army – LAA (Arabic: جيش لبنان العربي, romanized: Jayish Lubnān al-ʿArabī), also known variously as the Arab Army of Lebanon (AAL) and Arab Lebanese Army (ALA), Army of Arab Lebanon or Armée arabe du Liban (AAL) in French, was a predominantly Muslim splinter faction of the Lebanese Army that came to play a key role in the 1975–77 phase of the Lebanese Civil War.

== Emblem ==
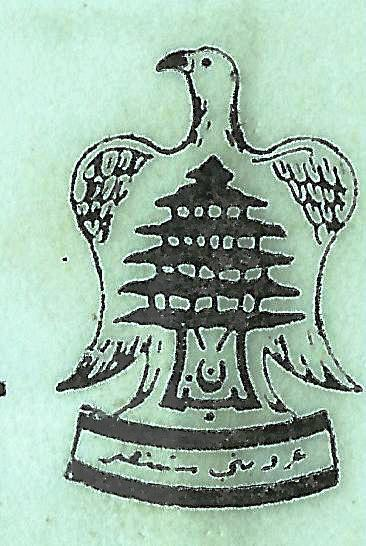
Emblem of the LAA (1976-78)

Upon its creation in January 1976, the LAA adopted as emblem a badge featuring an eagle with folded wings and a Lebanese Cedar tree at the centre, holding a scroll on its claws below, which portrayed the Militant group's ideology. The eagle itself symbolised Pan-Arabism, whilst the Cedar tree represented Lebanon, and the trunk of the tree featured "Lebanon" written in Arabic script. In the scroll at the bottom was depicted a quote in Arabic that translates as "My Arabism will prevail."

The motto "Lebanese Arab Army" written in Arabic script was often hastily painted or sprayed by LAA troops on the hull and turret of their armoured cars and tanks, and on the body of their transport vehicles.

== Origins ==
On 21 January 1976 at the Elias Abou Sleiman Barracks in Ablah, Zahlé District, in the Beqaa Valley, 900 Lebanese Muslim soldiers serving with the 1st Armoured Brigade (a.k.a. the "First Brigade") refused to fight against their coreligionists of the Lebanese National Movement (LNM) and mutinied under the leadership of Lieutenant Ahmed Al-Khatib, a Tank officer who originally commanded a 40 men-strong armored company in Rashaya, and urged his fellow Muslims to desert. The mutiny quickly spread to other Army barracks and garrisons on the southern part of the Beqaa and the Jabal Amel – including the strategic Beaufort Castle, Rashaya, Aramoun, Marjayoun, Khiam, Nabatieh and Sidon – and within a month, Lt. Khatib had rallied to his cause some 2,000-3,000 soldiers from the First Brigade, well-equipped with heavy weapons (including tanks and artillery). They became the core of the new Lebanese Arab Army (LAA), formally established on 31 January, who promptly went to the side of the LNM – Palestine Liberation Organization (PLO) alliance fighting the Christian-rightist Lebanese Front militias on the ongoing Lebanese Civil War, and on 3 February the LAA published its Manifesto which promoted a political program centered on the Arabism of Lebanon, Democratization and secularization.

On the surface, Khatib's rebellion seemed a spontaneous act that reflected Muslim discontent within the Lebanese Armed Forces (LAF) against their predominantly Christian leadership. The reality, however, was more complex. In fact, the mutiny had been secretly orchestrated by Fatah, the main Palestinian faction and had well-defined objectives. Fatah leaders – notably Yasser Arafat, Abu Iyad, Abu Jihad and Ali Hassan Salameh – had always regarded the Lebanese Army as a potential military threat to the PLO, a threat neutralized by the formation of the LAA. Moreover, Lt. Khatib was a pro-Palestinian Sunni Muslim dissident supported by the Rejectionist Front and Libya, and was himself ideologically aligned with the Lebanese Nasserist Al-Mourabitoun movement led by Ibrahim Kulaylat, the Arab Socialist Union (ASU) led by Abd al-Rahim Mrad and the Progressive Socialist Party (PSP) headed by Kamal Jumblatt.

== Structure and organization ==
Headquartered at Hasbaya Barracks in the Beqaa Valley, the LAA numbered at its peak some 4,400 uniformed regulars (though other sources list a total of just 2,000). The confessional identity of the soldiers was mostly Muslim, consisting of Shia Muslims from Southern Lebanon and Baalbek-Hermel, Sunni Muslims from the North, and Druzes from the Chouf. This total later included a small number of Syrian military officers sympathetic to the cause of the LNM-PLO alliance, who had defected from Syrian Arab Deterrent Force (ADF) units stationed in Lebanon after June 1976.

At the zenith of its power in March 1976, the LAA controlled three-quarters of all army barracks and posts in Lebanon, comprising the Elias Abou Sleiman Barracks at Ablah, the Sheikh Abdullah Barracks at Baalbek, the Rashaya Citadel at Rashaya, the Hanna Ghostine Barracks at Aramayn, the Saïd el-Khateeb Barracks at Hammana, the Bahjat Ghanem Barracks and Youssef Halayel Barracks at Tripoli, the Mohamed Zogheib Barracks at Sidon, and the Adloun and Benoit Barakat Barracks at Tyre. At West Beirut, LAA troops controlled the Emil Helou Barracks, the Emir Bachir Barracks, the Emir Fakhreddine Barracks and the Henri Chihab Barracks, plus the Lebanese Army High Center for Military Sport in Haret Hreik, the Military Beach Club (French: Bain Militaire) in Ras Beirut and the Grand Serail. Outside the Lebanese Capital, they also controlled the Kleyate Air Base in the northern Akkar District and the strategic Masnaa Border Crossing, situated on the Beirut-Aley-Damascus highway.

Being Pan-Arabist and radical secularist in orientation, the LAA received financial and material assistance from Fatah, Iraq and Libya.

== Ideology ==
Initially, Lt. Khatib formed the LAA in support of the Palestine Liberation Organization. The LAA was heavily aligned with the Lebanese National Movement and was a vocal critic of Maronite figures within the Lebanese government. It championed the prospect of an Arab Lebanese state.

Beyond advocating for the ousting of then-President Suleiman Frangieh, the LAA accused Maronite leaders of conspiring with right-wing Christian militias. In his appeals to his troops, Lt. Khatib stated that the lebanese armed Forces had been biased in favor of Christians. The LAA also called for the abolition of sectarianism and for social justice within Lebanon.

== People's Republic of Tyre ==
The LAA was also involved in January 1976 in the founding of the so-called People's Republic of Tyre (Arabic: جمهورية صور الشعبية| Jumhūriyya Ṣūr al-Ša'biyya), a short-lived autonomous Canton formed that same month at the port city of Tyre in Southern Lebanon. With the active support of their Arab Socialist Action Party – Lebanon (ASAP–L) and LAA allies, local Palestine Liberation Organization (PLO) commanders took over the municipal government of the city, proclaimed the "People's Republic of Tyre", occupied the Lebanese Army's Adloun and Benoit Barakat Barracks, set up roadblocks and started collecting customs at the port. However, the joint PLO-LAA "People's Republic of Tyre" government quickly lost the political support of the local population, mostly due to their "arbitrary and often brutal behavior".

== List of LAA commanders ==
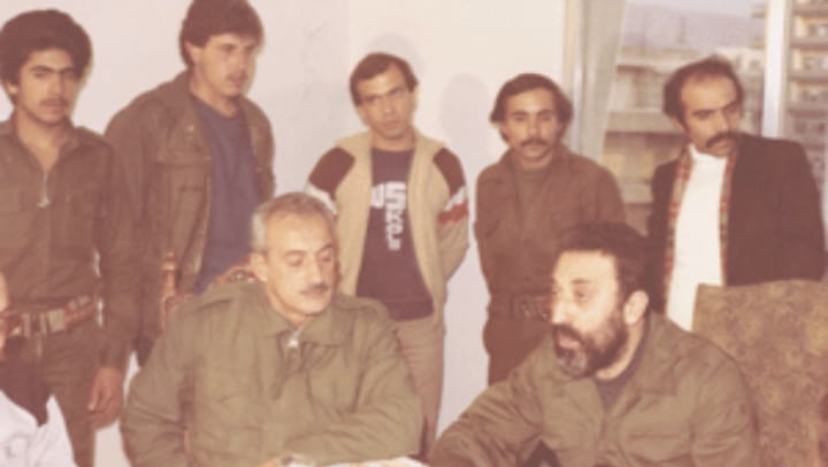
Lieutenant Ahmad al-Khatib (right) and Major Ahmad Ma'amari (left) with five of their soldiers in the background, c.1976.

- Lieutenant Ahmad al-Khatib (LAA commander-in-chief), Sunni
- Major Ahmed Boutari, Sunni
- Major Ahmad Ma'amari (Northern Lebanon LAA commander), Sunni
- Lieutenant Amine Kassem (Baalbek LAA commander), Shiite
- 2nd Lieutenant Bassam al-Idilbi (LAA Chief of Operations), Sunni
- Captain Ghazi Ghotaymi, Shiite
- Major Hussein Awwad (LAA artillery corps' commander), Shiite
- Major Ibrahim Chahine, Shiite
- Lieutenant Mou'in Hatoum, Shiite
- Lieutenant Omar Abdallah, Sunni
- Lieutenant colonel Youssif Mansour, Shiite
- Mustafa Hamdan

== The LAA in the Lebanese Civil War 1976-77 ==
Closely allied with the Muslim-leftist Lebanese National Movement (LNM) militias and the Palestine Liberation Organization (PLO) guerrilla factions, the LAA battled the Christian-rightist militias of the Lebanese Front and the Army of Free Lebanon (AFL) at Beirut, but also fought at the Beqaa Valley, and the districts of northern and southern Lebanon.

Between January–March 1976, during the episode known as the "War of the Barracks", Lt. Khatib and his rebellious soldiers managed to seize parts of the Beqaa and south Lebanon regions, and the northern port city of Tripoli, all areas with a clear Muslim majority. Lt. Khatib later claimed that his LAA faction controlled over 80 percent of Lebanon's territory and was just 10 km away from Jounieh, the unofficial "Capital" of the Marounistan, an enclave created by the predominately Maronite Christian Lebanese Front militias in late 1976.

On 14 January 1976, the LAA, allied with the PLO-LNM joint forces militias, unsuccessfully besieged the Greek Catholic town of Zahlé in the Beqaa Valley, then held by the Zahliote Group, a local Christian militia, in retaliation for the fall of the Palestinian refugee camp of Dbayeh in the hands of the Lebanese Front's Christian militias earlier that same day.

On 5 March 1976 a LAA unit under the command of Major Ahmad Ma'amari clashed with the 200 men-strong, predominately Christian Lebanese Liberation Army (LLA) dissident faction of the Lebanese Army at the towns of Al-Qoubaiyat and Andaket in the Akkar District of Northern Lebanon.

On 15 March, the LAA units stationed in Beirut, the Beqaa, and northern Lebanon announced their support to Brigadier general Aziz Al-Ahdab's failed coup attempt against President Suleiman Frangieh, and in the course of the Battle of the Hotels later that month, the LAA provided armored and artillery support to the LNM-PLO joint forces and the Shi'ite Amal Movement militia during their all-out offensive against rightist Lebanese Front militias' positions in central Beirut. On 21 March, a major assault by special Palestinian PLO Commando units using armored vehicles lent by the LAA and supported by the leftist-Muslim militias finally managed to dislodge the Christian-rightist Kataeb Regulatory Forces (KRF) from the Holiday Inn, in the Hotels district.

Amid intense shelling, the LAA under Maj. Ahmed Boutari launched on 25 March a two-pronged combined ground assault with the LNM militias on the Presidential Palace at Baabda, where they fought the hard-pressed Republican Guard battalion and Marada Brigade militiamen loyal to President Frangieh, although he decamped to the safety of Zouk Mikael, near Jounieh, and later to Kfour in the Keserwan District. Eventually, the LAA armored columns coming from their barracks at Sidon, the Beqaa Valley, and Hammana were stopped and blocked by the Syrian-backed As-Sa'iqa guerrillas and Palestine Liberation Army troops at Khalde and Ouza'i near Baabda, at Chtaura in the Beqaa, and at Mdeidej and Soufar in the Aley District.

On late March–early April 1976, the LAA and the Druze Popular Liberation Forces (PLF) militia fought the Internal Security Forces (ISF) and Army of Free Lebanon's (AFL) units during an unsuccessful attempt to raid the AFL Headquarters at the Shukri Ghanem Barracks complex in the Fayadieh district of East Beirut.

Besides engaging in combat operations alongside the Arab Socialist Union militia and the Lebanese Arab Gendarmerie, the LAA was also involved in training the Al-Mourabitoun militia.

=== The Vanguards of the Lebanese Arab Army ===
The Vanguards of the Lebanese Arab Army – VLAA (Arabic: طلائع الجيش العربي اللبناني | Talaei al-Jayish al-Arabi al-Lubnani) or Avant-gardes du Armée du Liban Arabe (AALA) in French, were a short-lived splinter faction of the LAA that began to be formed in February 1976 at Rayak Barracks by four Lebanese Army officers whom openly defied Lt. Khatib's leadership, Major (later, Colonel) Ibrahim Chahine, Major Fahim al-Hajj, Captain Jamil Al Sayyed, and Mahmoud Matar. Headquartered at Rayak, close to the namesake Lebanese Air Force main Air Base, it was formally established as the VLAA on 3 June 1976 by Maj. Ibrahim Chahine, and was created and sponsored by Syria in the hope of attracting both Muslim and Christian officers and enlisted men to act as a counterweight to the Palestinian-supported LAA.

However, the new VLAA failed to attract a sizeable following and it was largely ineffective, since its 400 soldiers abstained from involving themselves in any of the major battles fought at the time in Beirut and Mount Lebanon. The only relevant actions carried out by the understrength Syrian-sponsored VLAA were the deployment of its soldiers to the town of Chtaura, Beqaa Valley, on 8 May 1976, in order to provide security to the newly elected President of Lebanon Elias Sarkis sworn-in ceremony held at the Chtaura Park Hotel, followed in August that year by the deployment of some of its elements around the southern town of Nabatieh.

For most of the time, VLAA personnel were either confined to barracks or guarded the adjoining Rayak Air Base, where most of the flying assets of the Lebanese Air Force where concentrated (with exception of the helicopters, stationed at Beirut Air Base, and the Dassault Mirage IIIEL fighter jets, kept at Kleyate Air Base).

=== Decline and disbandment ===
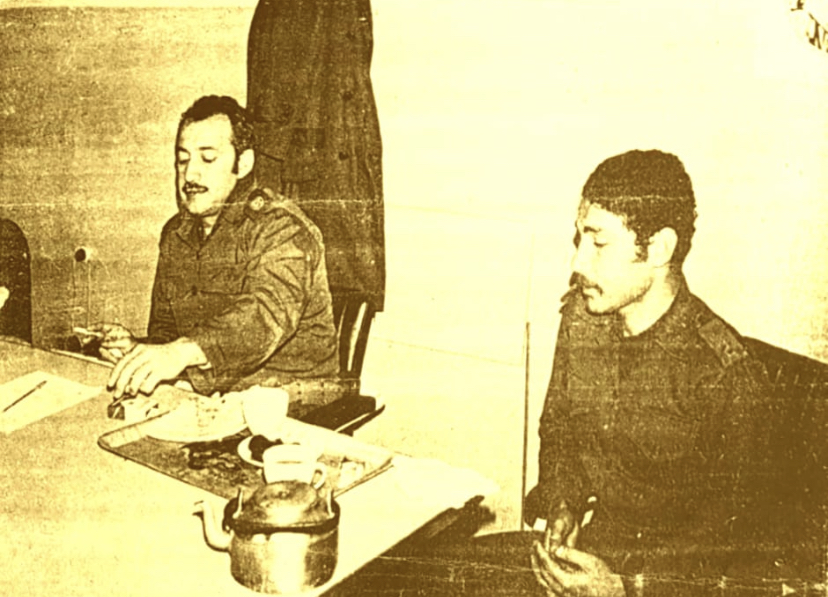
Major Ahmad Ma'amari (left) and Lieutenant Mou'in Hatoum (right), ca.1976–1983.

Khatib's opposition to the June 1976 Syrian intervention in Lebanon, however, marked the beginning of the end for his LAA faction. Although the LAA did put a stiff resistance – notably at the Battle of Bhamdoun in the Chouf District between 13 and 17 October 1976, where they and their PLO, Al-Mourabitoun and Druze PLF allies inflicted heavy losses on the Syrian 3rd Armoured Division – its numbers dwindled to a few hundred by the end of the year, as many of Khatib's soldiers deserted after realizing that they had been played and used by the PLO. Chiefly among them was Maj. Ahmad Ma'amari, who had defected earlier in June with his troops of the LAA northern command and went over to the Syrians. Several Druze soldiers also left the LAA to join the Popular Liberation Forces (PLF) militia.

Increasingly military weakened and politically marginalized, the LAA suffered a final, shattering blow on 18 January 1977 when Syrian authorities invited the entire LAA leadership – Khatib, Ghotaymi, Manssour, Hamdan, and Addam – to a meeting with President Hafez al-Assad in Damascus. However, upon crossing the border to Syria, they were immediately detained and secretly held in the infamous Mezzeh Military Prison. After spending between 18 and 24 months in prison, they were subsequently released on 8 October 1978 on the condition they resign their commissions and abstain from all political and military activity thereafter. Their political role at an end, both the LAA and VLAA were disbanded (the Syrian officers that had deserted to the LAA the previous year were arrested and shot), with their officers and enlisted men being simply returned without receiving any punishment or sanction to the First Brigade, which was re-incorporated into the official Lebanese Army order-of-battle in February 1977.

In June that year, however, upon the insistence of the then Lebanese Defense and Foreign Affairs Minister Fouad Boutros, several ex-LAA officers were officially discharged from the Lebanese Army, notably Majors Ahmad Ma'amari and Ahmad Boutari, Lieutenants Ahmed Al-Khatib, Mou'in Hatoum and Omar Abdallah, and 2nd Lieutenant Bassam al-Idilbi. Like their colleagues of the AFL, they were never put on trial by a military court on charges of desertion and treason, gradually fading into obscurity afterwards.

== Weapons and equipment ==
The LAA was equipped largely from stocks drawn from Lebanese Army and Internal Security Forces (ISF) reserves, with small-arms and vehicles taken directly from Army barracks and ISF police stations or funnelled through the PLO.

=== Small-arms ===
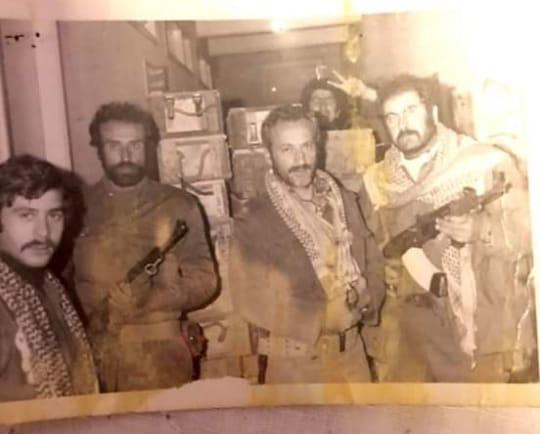
Major Ahmad Ma'amari with LAA soldiers armed with AK-47 assault rifles, ca.1976.

LAA infantry units were issued FN FAL, CETME Model C, M16A1, AK-47 and AKM assault rifles; FN MAG, M60, RPK and RPD light machine guns were used as squad weapons, with heavier Browning M1919A4 .30 Cal and Browning M2HB .50 Cal machine guns being employed as platoon and company weapons. Officers and NCOs received FN P35 and MAB PA-15 pistols. Grenade launchers and portable anti-tank weapons consisted of RL-83 Blindicide, M72 LAW, RPG-2 and RPG-7 anti-tank rocket launchers, whilst crew-served and indirect fire weapons comprised M2 60 mm mortars, M30 4.2 inch (106.7mm) mortars and 120-PM-38 (M-1938) 120 mm heavy mortars, B-10 82 mm and M40A1 106 mm recoilless rifles, and one-shot DKB Grad-P 122 mm Light portable rocket systems.

=== Armoured and transport vehicles ===
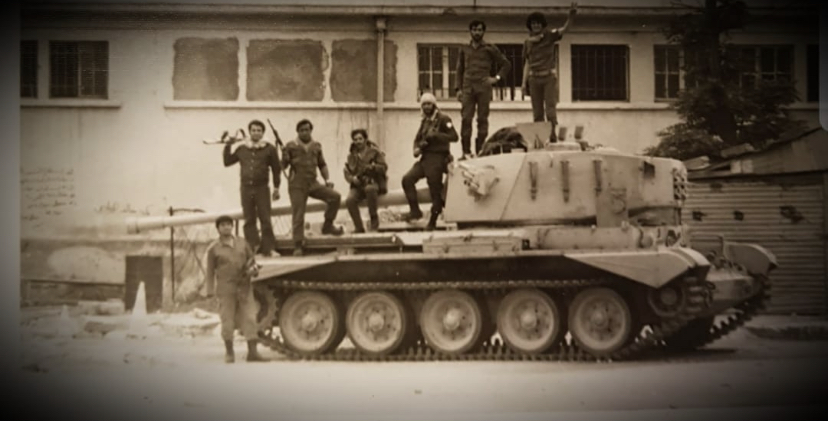
LAA soldiers on top of a captured Charioteer tank, 1 January 1978.

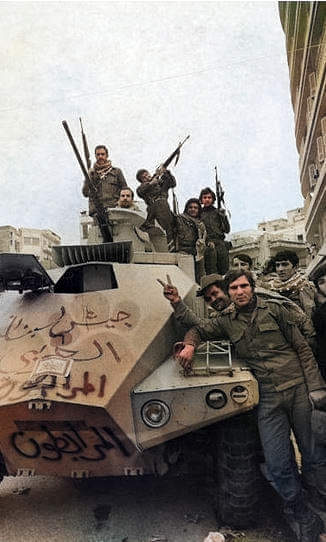
LAA soldiers and allied Al-Mourabitoun militiamen gather around a captured Panhard M3 VTT parked in front of the Lebanese Arab radio station in west Beirut, ca.1976.

By using the assets of the First Brigade, the LAA built a powerful armoured corps totaling 40 armored vehicles, including fourteen Sherman Firefly Mk Vc medium tanks, Charioteer tanks, M41A3 Walker Bulldog and twenty AMX-13 light tanks, M42A1 Duster SPAAGs, and Panhard AML-90 and Staghound armoured cars. Infantry units were provided with tracked M113, sixteen M59 amphibious and wheeled Panhard M3 VTT armoured personnel carriers; a few BMP-1 APCs were later captured from the Syrian Army in 1976. Artillery units relied on military trucks and M5A1 artillery tractors to tow their field guns and howitzers.

A fleet of liaison and transport vehicles were also employed for logistical support, which included US Willys M38A1 MD jeeps (or its civilian version, the Jeep CJ-5), US M151A1 jeeps, US Kaiser M715 jeeps, US Jeep Gladiator J20 pickup trucks, US Chevrolet C-10/C-15 Cheyenne light pickup trucks, British Land-Rover Mk IIA-III light pickups, plus heavier Saviem SM8 TRM4000 4x4, Berliet GBC 8KT 6x6, British Bedford RL lorries, Soviet KrAZ 255 6x6, Chevrolet C-50 medium-duty, Dodge F600 medium-duty, GMC C7500 heavy-duty trucks and US M35A2 2½-ton 6x6 cargo trucks. They were also used as gun trucks (a.k.a. technicals) in the direct fire support role on LAA operations, armed with heavy machine guns (HMGs), recoilless rifles, and anti-aircraft autocannons.

=== Artillery ===
Their artillery corps fielded a number of artillery pieces of several types, comprising US M101A1 105 mm towed field howitzers, Soviet 2A18 (D-30) 122 mm howitzers, and French Mle 1950 BF-50 155 mm howitzers. Yugoslav Zastava M55 20mm triple-barreled and Soviet ZU-23-2 23mm twin-barreled anti-aircraft autocannons (mounted on M113 APCs) were also employed in both the air defense and direct fire supporting roles.

== See also ==
- Al-Mourabitoun
- Arab Deterrent Force
- Army of Free Lebanon
- Battle of the Hotels
- Internal Security Forces
- Lebanese Armed Forces
- Lebanese Civil War
- Lebanese National Movement
- List of extrajudicial killings and political violence in Lebanon
- List of weapons of the Lebanese Civil War
- People's Liberation Army (Lebanon)
- People's Republic of Tyre
- Vanguard of the Maani Army (Movement of the Druze Jihad)
- Zahliote Group
- 2nd Infantry Brigade (Lebanon)
