= Tall Chegah =

Tall Chegah or Tal Chegah or Tol Chegah (Persian: تل چگاه), also rendered as Tal Cheka and Tal Cheqa, may refer to:

- Tall Chegah-e Olya, Khuzestan Province
- Tall Chegah-e Sofla, Khuzestan Province
- Tal-e Chegah, Kohgiluyeh and Boyer-Ahmad
- Tal-e Chegah, Basht, Kohgiluyeh and Boyer-Ahmad Province
