= Zeydan =

Zeydan (Persian: زيدان) may refer to:

- Zeydan, Bushehr
- Zeydan, Khuzestan
- Zeydan, alternate name of Cham, Behbahan, Khuzestan province
- Zeydan, South Khorasan
- Zeydan, West Azerbaijan

== See also ==
- Zaidan (disambiguation)
- Zeydun (disambiguation)
