= Sholeh =

Sholeh (Arabic: شعله) may refer to:

== People ==
- Muhammad Sholeh Ibrahim, Indonesian leader of Jamaah Ansharut Tauhid
- Sholeh Maani, New Zealand academic
- Sholeh Mahmoed Nasution, known as Ustadz Solmed, Indonesian preacher and actor
- Sholeh Rezazadeh (born 1989), Iranian-born Dutch writer and poet
- Sholeh Wolpé, Iranian-American poet

== Geography ==
- Sholeh-ye Zardu
- Sholeh-ye Zarik
