= Darunak =

Darunak or Dorunak (Persian: درونك) may refer to:

- Dorunak, Fars
- Dorunak, Khuzestan
- Dorunak Rural District, in Khuzestan Province
