= Longir =

Longir (Persian: لنگير) may refer to:

- Longir-e Olya
- Longir-e Sofla
- Longir-e Vosta
