= Army of Free Lebanon =

Former Christian splinter faction of the Lebanese Army during the Lebanese Civil War

- جيش لبنان الحر
- Flag of the Army of Free Lebanon (1976–78)
- Leaders: Antoine Barakat; Fouad Malek; Saad Haddad; Ghazi Ghattas; Samir el-Achkar; Khalil Nader; Mounir Bejjani; Abdallah Hadchiti; Michel Abou Ghanem; Louis Khoury; Makhoul Hakmeh; Wehbeh Katicha
- Dates active: January 1976 – March 1978
- Headquarters: Shukri Ghanem Barracks
- Active regions: East Beirut, Mount Lebanon, Northern Lebanon, Southern Lebanon
- Ideology: Lebanese nationalism; Christian nationalism; Anti-communism; Anti-Palestinianism; Anti-pan-Arabism
- Political position: Right-wing
- Status: Disbanded
- Size: 3,000 men
- Wars: Lebanese Civil War

The Army of Free Lebanon – AFL (Arabic: جيش لبنان الحر, romanized: Jayish Lubnan al-Horr), also known variously as the Colonel Barakat's Army (Arabic: جيش بركات, romanized: Jayish Barakat) or Armée du Liban Libre (ALL) and Armée du Colonel Barakat in French, was a predominantly Christian splinter faction of the Lebanese Army that came to play a major role in the 1975–77 phase of the Lebanese Civil War.

== Emblem ==
Upon its formation, the AFL adopted as logo a rectangular (or square) red and blue "flash" with a stylized white Lebanese cedar tree in the middle, which was hastily painted on their armoured and transport vehicles; sometimes the motto "Free Lebanon" (Arabic: لبنان الحر | Lubnan al-Horr) written in Arabic script was painted alongside the flash on the hull and turret of the tanks. In alternative, a greenish-yellow stencil, bearing the Lebanese Armed Forces (LAF) coat-of-arms was also applied to their vehicles.

== Origins ==
The AFL began to be established on January 23, 1976, in Beirut by Lebanese Colonel Antoine Barakat who declared loyalty to the then President of Lebanon Suleiman Frangieh. A Maronite from Frangieh's hometown Zgharta, Barakat rose with the troops of the Beirut Command (about 700 soldiers) in response for Lieutenant Ahmed Al-Khatib's rebellion two days earlier at the head of the breakaway Lebanese Arab Army (LAA). Another officer, the head of Jounieh garrison Major Fouad Malek, supported the Barakat-led faction, as did Major Saad Haddad the commander of the Marjayoun garrison in southern Lebanon. These three formations where eventually integrated into the "Army of Free Lebanon", whose creation was formally announced on March 13, 1976, by Col. Barakat at the Shukri Ghanem Barracks in the Fayadieh district of East Beirut.

== Structure ==
=== Field organization ===
Headquartered at Shukri Ghanem Barracks, a major military facility situated at Fayadieh in the vicinity of the Ministry of Defense complex at Yarze, the AFL numbered some 3,000 uniformed regulars by 1978, mostly Christian Maronites and Greek-Catholics. Like the LAA, the AFL also maintained a flexible structure unlike the old regular Lebanese Armed Forces (LAF), with the bulk of the force comprising some 1,500-2,000 soldiers from different Army units assembled into eight independent mixed combat groups (French: Groupements) of roughly company or battalion size. There was no set hierarchy, and rank and seniority meant little; performance in the field and political motivation propelled young Army officers – mostly Lieutenants – into leadership positions within the AFL combat groups. By February 1978, they were structured as follows:

- Group No 11 (French: Groupement numéro 11) – led by Captain Mounir Bejjani;
- Group No 12 (French: Groupement numéro 12) – led by Lieutenants Michel Abou Ghanem and Louis Khoury;
- Group No 14 (French: Groupement numéro 14) – led by Lt. Makhoul Hakmeh;
- Group No 16 (French: Groupement numéro 16) – led by Lieutenants Abdallah Hadchiti and Ghazi Ghattas;
- Group No 18 (French: Groupement numéro 18) – led by Maj. Fouad Malek, later replaced by Lt. Wehbeh Katicha;
- Galerie Semaan Battalion – a mechanized unit, also led by Lt. Ghazi Ghattas;
- A company-sized contingent (subsequently expanded to battalion strength) from the Army Para-commando regiment (Arabic: فوج المغاوير transliteration Fauj al-Maghaweer) led by Captain Samir el-Achkar.

All these units were permanently allocated at Fayadieh, serving under Col. Barakat's direct orders. Outside Beirut, a 200-strong battalion designated the "Akkar Brigade" (Arabic: لواء عكار | Liwa' el-Akkar), led by Lt. Khalil Nader was stationed in the Akkar District of northern Lebanon. A 500-strong battalion under the title "Army of Lebanon" (Arabic: جيش لبنان | Jayish Lubnan) was based at the Raymond el-Hayek Barracks in Sarba, north of Jounieh headed by Maj. Malek, whilst another battalion of 700 men led by Maj. Haddad and designated the "Marjayoun–Qlaiaa Formation" (Arabic: تكوين مرجعيون - قليعة | Takwin Marjayoun – Qlaiaa), was stationed at Marjayoun Barracks.

== List of AFL commanders ==
- Colonel Antoine Barakat (AFL commander-in-chief)
- Major Fouad Malek
- Major Saad Haddad
- Captain Samir el-Achkar
- Captain Mounir Bejjani
- Lieutenant Abdallah Hadchiti
- Lieutenant Ghazi Ghattas
- Lieutenant Khalil Nader
- Lieutenant Michel Abou Ghanem
- Lieutenant Louis Khoury
- Lieutenant Makhoul Hakmeh
- Lieutenant Wehbeh Katicha

=== Other AFL personnel ===
- Sergeant Aql Hashem

== The AFL in the Lebanese civil war 1976-78 ==
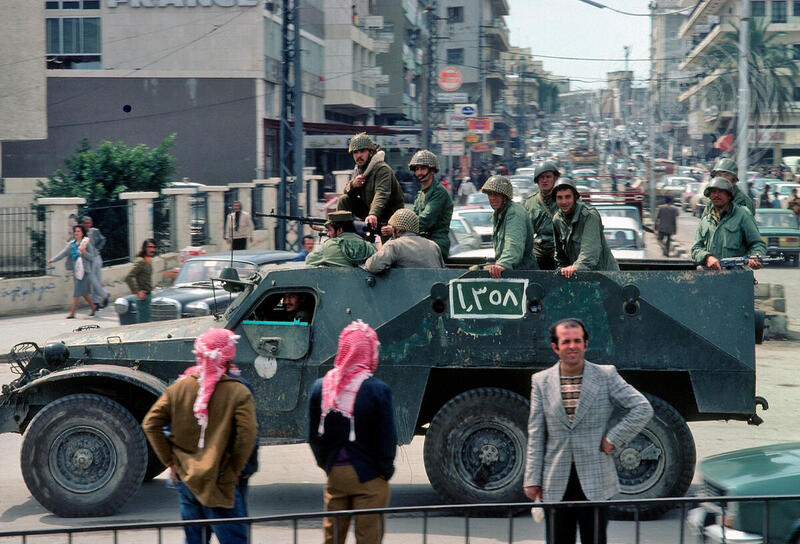
A Syrian BTR-152 armoured personnel carrier patrols the streets of the Lebanese port city of Saida (Sidon), March 1978.

Closely allied with the rightist Christian militias of the Lebanese Front, the AFL battled the leftist Lebanese National Movement (LNM) militias, the LAA and the Palestine Liberation Organization (PLO) guerrilla factions at Beirut, but also fought in northern Lebanon. On March 5, 1976, some 200 Christian AFL soldiers led by Lt. Khalil Nader – who entitled themselves the "Lebanese Liberation Army" (LLA), and later became the "Akkar Brigade" – from the Jounieh garrison departed without permission from their commanding Officer to their home towns of Al-Qoubaiyat and Andaket in the Akkar District of Northern Lebanon, which were being threatened by LAA attacks and artillery bombardments.

On March 13 at Beirut, the AFL units from the Shukri Ghanem Barracks in Fayadieh under Col. Barakat clashed with the Officer cadets of the adjoining Military Academy, whose Commander supported Brigadier general Aziz Al-Ahdab's failed coup attempt against President Frangieh, despite the fact that some officers from the AFL (Fouad Malek, Wehbeh Katicha, and Ghazi Ghattas) had signed a petition pledging their support to Gen. Ahdab's initiative. Later on March 25, Col. Barakat's troops bolstered the hard-pressed Republican Guard battalion and Marada Brigade militiamen loyal to President Frangieh in defending the Presidential Palace at Baabda from a two-pronged combined LNM-Lebanese Arab Army (LAA) ground assault amid intense shelling, though prior to the attack the President had decamped to the safety of Zouk Mikael, near Jounieh, and later to Kfour in the Keserwan District. They also provided armour and artillery support to the Christian militias on the closing stages of the Battle of the Hotels, during which an artillery barrage fired by a unit under Barakat's command struck the campus of the American University of Beirut at Rue Bliss in the neighboring Ras Beirut district, causing a number of casualties among the students.

On late March–early April 1976 the AFL, aided by the Internal Security Forces (ISF), fought off successfully an attempt by the LAA and the Druze Popular Liberation Forces (PLF) militia to raid their own Headquarters at the Shukri Ghanem Barracks complex in the Fayadieh district of East Beirut. Under the command of Maj. Fouad Malek, AFL units resumed the same roles later in the sieges of the PLO-held Palestinian refugee camps of Jisr el-Basha and Tel al-Zaatar at East Beirut between June and August 1976.

During the Hundred Days' War in early February 1978, the AFL found itself besieged and bombarded by the Syrian Army in their Fayadieh barracks, though they later helped the NLP Tigers and the newly constituted Lebanese Forces' Command in driving the Syrians out from East Beirut.

== Disbandment ==
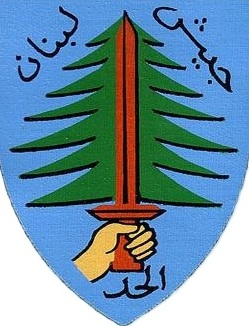
Free Lebanon Army shoulder patch 1976–1984

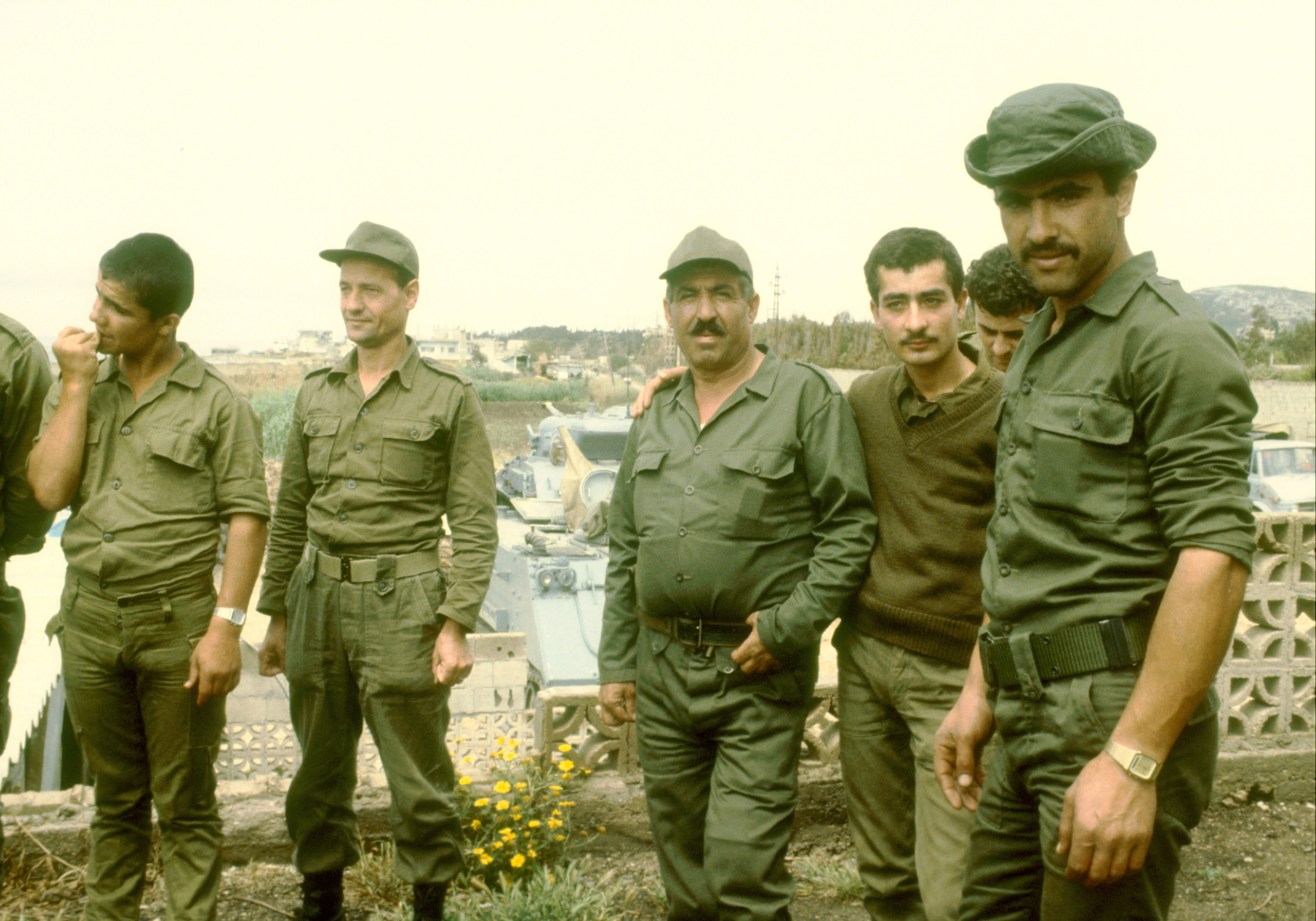
Former AFL Christian soldiers of the Marjayoun garrison, now serving with the Free Lebanon Army, on duty at the Lebanese southern border, January 1977.

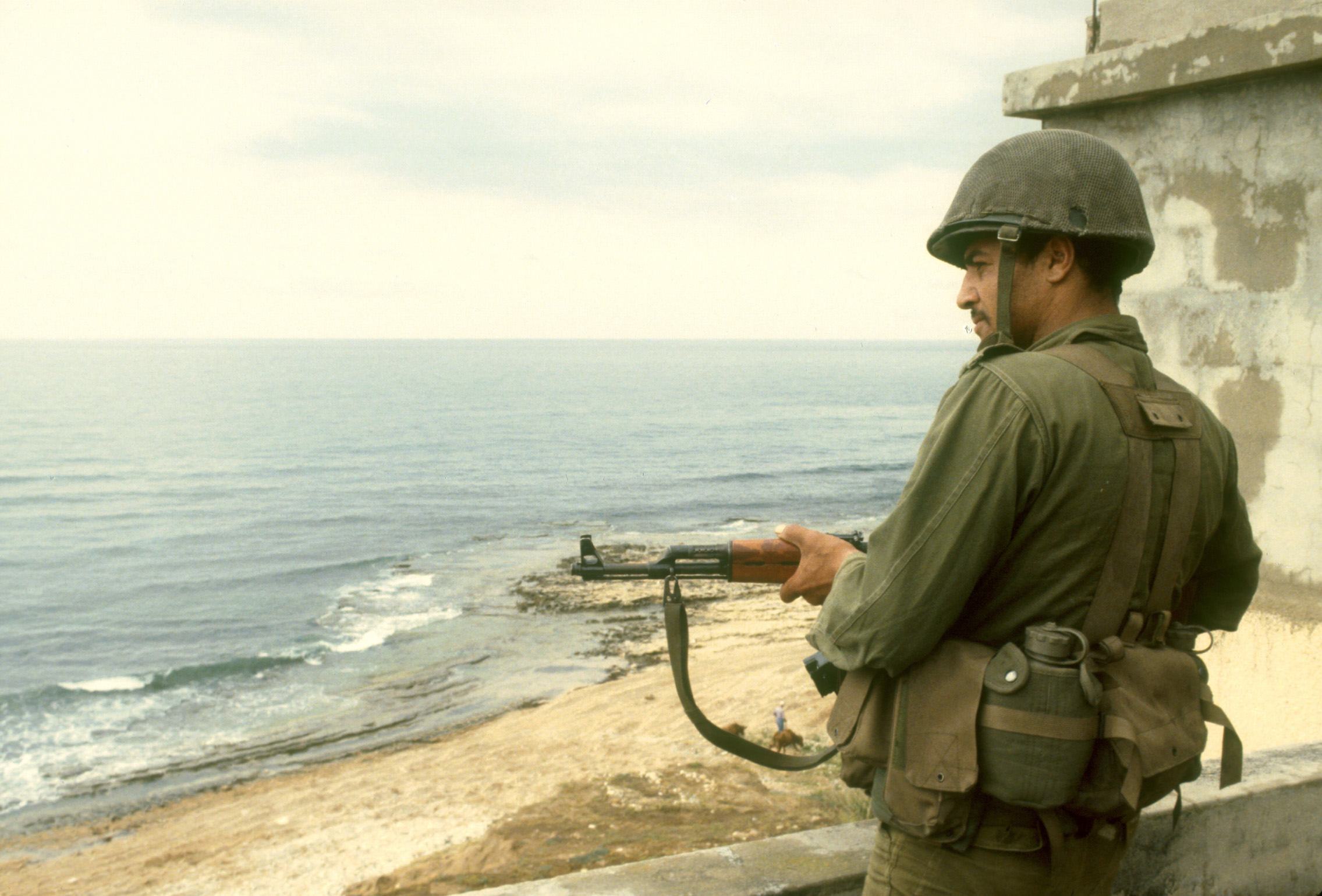
A Free Lebanon Army soldier wearing an Ephod Combat Vest on patrol along the Lebanese southern border, January 1977.

In March 1977, the newly elected President of Lebanon Elias Sarkis began slowly to reorganize the battered Lebanese Armed Forces (LAF) structure, which had split into four (or six, according to other sources) sectarian factions. The first fraction of the AFL to be re-integrated into the official battle order of the re-organized Lebanese Army in June 1977 was the Jounieh garrison, whose commander Fouad Malek was promoted to colonel and sent to the École de Guerre in Paris, where he deserted in 1978 to become head of the Lebanese Forces (LF) official representation at the French Capital the following year. In March 1978 at Beirut, Col. Barakat handed over the Fayadieh barracks back to the official authorities, thus effectively signalling the disbandment of the AFL and the return of his troops to the LAF structure. Surprisingly, instead of being court-marshalled for insubordination, Antoine Barakat was promoted to brigadier general and appointed as Military Attaché to the Embassy of Lebanon in Washington, D.C., where he retired. Nearly all the remaining AFL combat group commanders' were rapidly re-integrated into the LAF without receiving any punishment or sanction, which enabled them to pursue their military careers unimpeded – Lt. Makhoul Hakmeh eventually rose to the rank of colonel and went to serve with General Michel Aoun as commander of the 10th Airmobile Brigade during the Elimination War in January–October 1990.

One notable exception was Captain Samir el-Achkar and his commando battalion (Arabic: Maghaweer), who contested the re-integration process. Accused on 23 February 1978 by Colonel Sami el-Khatib, the commander of the Arab Deterrent Force (ADF), of being the instigator of the incident that sparked the Hundred Days' War, Capt. el-Achkar refused to be put on trial by a military court on charges of desertion and treason, rebelling a few days later with his troops by establishing the Lebanese Army Revolutionary Command (LARC), another dissident faction of the Lebanese Army closely aligned with the Kataeb Regulatory Forces (KRF) militia led by Bashir Gemayel. The crisis came to an abrupt end on 1 November that year, when the LAF Command ordered a raid by a 300-strong commando detachment from the Counter-sabotage regiment (Arabic: Moukafaha) under the command of Captain Michel Harrouk and Lieutenants Maroun Khreich and Kozhayya Chamoun on the LARC headquarters at Mtaileb in the Matn District, which resulted in the wounding and subsequent death of Capt. Samir el-Achkar, followed by the full re-incorporation of his men into the official Para-commando Regiment's own structure.

A different fate however, awaited the ex-AFL troops of the Marjayoun garrison in the south. By late 1976, pressure from PLO and LNM-LAA militias finally forced Major Saad Haddad to evacuate the town and withdraw unopposed with his battalion to the village of Qlaiaa, close to the border with Israel. Here Maj. Haddad and his men placed themselves under the protection of the Israel Defense Forces (IDF), eventually providing the cadre – after merging with local Christian, Shia Muslim and Druze militias, gathered since October 21 into the informal "Army for the Defense of South Lebanon" or ADSL (French: Armée de Défense du Liban-Sud or ADLS) – of the so-called "Free Lebanese Army" (FLA), later to become known as the South Lebanon Army (SLA).

== Weapons and equipment ==
The AFL was equipped largely from stocks drawn from Lebanese Army reserves, with weapons taken directly from Army barracks and depots or funneled through the Christian rightist militias of the Lebanese Front.

=== Small-arms ===
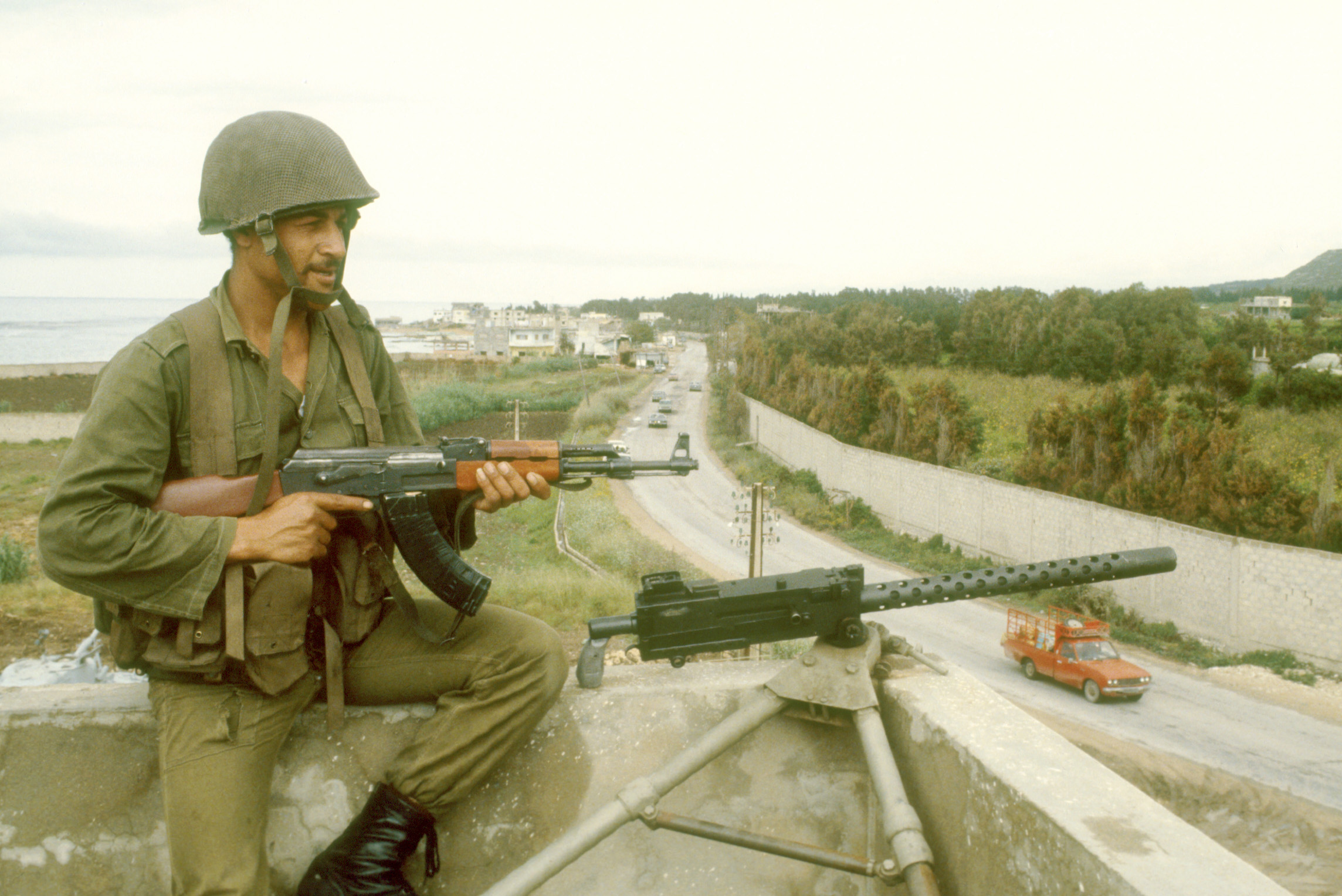
Free Lebanon Army soldier on guard duty armed with an AK-47 assault rifle and a Browning M1919A4 .30 Cal machine gun, southern Lebanon, January 1977.

AFL infantry units were issued FN FAL, CETME Model C and M16A1 assault rifles; FN MAG and M60 light machine guns were used as squad weapons, with heavier Browning M1919A4 .30 Cal and Browning M2HB .50 Cal machine guns being employed as platoon and company weapons. Officers and NCOs received FN P35 and MAB PA-15 pistols. Grenade launchers and portable anti-tank weapons consisted of Belgian RL-83 Blindicide, M72 LAW and Soviet RPG-7 anti-tank rocket launchers, whilst crew-served and indirect fire weapons comprised M2 60mm mortars, M30 4.2 inch (106.7mm) mortars and 120-PM-38 (M-1938) 120mm heavy mortars, plus B-10 82mm and M40A1 106mm recoilless rifles.

=== Armoured and transport vehicles ===
Each combat group or fraction fielded conventional armour, infantry and artillery sub-units, provided with Panhard AML-90 and 33 Staghound Mk.III armoured cars, AMX-13 and M41A3 Walker Bulldog light tanks, Charioteer tanks, four M42A1 Duster SPAAGs, plus tracked M113 and wheeled Panhard M3 VTT armored personnel carriers.

For logistical support, Col. Barakat's troops relied on US Willys M38A1 MD jeeps (or its civilian version, the Jeep CJ-5), US M151A2 jeeps, US Kaiser M715 jeeps, Jeep Gladiator J20 pickup trucks, Chevrolet C-10/C-15 Cheyenne light pickup trucks, and British Land-Rover Mk IIA-III light pickups, plus Chevrolet C-50 medium-duty, Dodge F600 medium-duty, Saviem SM8 TRM4000 4x4, Berliet GBC 8KT 6x6, British Bedford RL lorries, Soviet KrAZ 255 6x6, GMC C7500 heavy-duty trucks and US M35A2 2½-ton 6x6 cargo trucks. These liaison and transport vehicles were also employed as gun trucks (a.k.a. technicals) in the direct fire support role on AFL ground operations, armed with heavy machine guns (HMGs), recoilless rifles and anti-aircraft autocannons. Artillery units relied on military trucks and M5A1 artillery tractors to tow their field guns and howitzers.

=== Artillery ===
Their artillery formations fielded British QF Mk III 25-Pounder field guns, Soviet M-30 122mm (M-1938) Howitzers and French Mle 1950 BF-50 155mm howitzers. Six British Bofors 40mm L/60 anti-aircraft guns, six Yugoslav Zastava M55 20mm triple-barreled autocannons, Hispano-Suiza HS.661 30mm single-barreled AA autocannons, and 24 Soviet ZU-23-2 23mm twin-barreled AA autocannons were also employed in the direct fire supporting role.

== See also ==
- Battle of the Hotels
- Hundred Days' War
- Internal Security Forces
- Lebanese Armed Forces
- Lebanese Arab Army
- Lebanese Civil War
- Lebanese Front
- Lebanese Forces (militia)
- List of extrajudicial killings and political violence in Lebanon
- List of weapons of the Lebanese Civil War
- South Lebanon Army
- Tel al-Zaatar massacre
- Vanguard of the Maani Army (Movement of the Druze Jihad)
- 4th Infantry Brigade (Lebanon)
- 7th Infantry Brigade (Lebanon)
- 10th Airmobile Brigade
