= Qaleh Dezh =

Qaleh Dezh or Qaleh-ye Dezh (Persian: قلعه دژ) may refer to:

- Qaleh Dezh, Hormozgan
- Qaleh Dezh, Khuzestan
- Qaleh-ye Dezh, Kohgiluyeh and Boyer-Ahmad
