= Tall-e Siasat =

Tall-e Siasat تل سياست
- Village
- Location within Iran
- Coordinates: 30°26′28″N 49°57′01″E
- Country: Iran
- Province: Khuzestan
- County: Behbahan
- Bakhsh: Zeydun
- Rural District: Dorunak

Population (2006)
  - Total: 255
- Time zone: UTC+3:30 (IRST)
  - Summer (DST): UTC+4:30 (IRDT)

Tall-e Siasat (Persian: تل سياست, also Romanized as Tall-e Sīāsat and Tol Sīāsat) is a village in Dorunak Rural District, Zeydun District, Behbahan County, Khuzestan Province, Iran. At the 2006 census, its population was 255, in 62 families.
