= Cheshmeh Morad =

Cheshmeh Morad چشمه مراد
- Village
- Location within Iran
- Coordinates: 30°23′53″N 50°00′58″E
- Country: Iran
- Province: Khuzestan
- County: Behbahan
- Bakhsh: Zeydun
- Rural District: Dorunak

Population (2006)
  - Total: 277
- Time zone: UTC+3:30 (IRST)
  - Summer (DST): UTC+4:30 (IRDT)

Cheshmeh Morad (Persian: چشمه مراد, also Romanized as Cheshmeh Morād and Chashmeh Morād) is a village in Dorunak Rural District, Zeydun District, Behbahan County, Khuzestan Province, Iran. At the 2006 census, its population was 277, in 68 families.
