= Dar Alai =

Dar Alai دارعلايي
- Village
- Location within Iran
- Coordinates: 30°20′50″N 50°04′55″E
- Country: Iran
- Province: Khuzestan
- County: Behbahan
- Bakhsh: Zeydun
- Rural District: Dorunak

Population (2006)
  - Total: 162
- Time zone: UTC+3:30 (IRST)
  - Summer (DST): UTC+4:30 (IRDT)

Dar Alai (Persian: دارعلايي, also Romanized as Dār 'Alā’ī) is a village in Dorunak Rural District, Zeydun District, Behbahan County, Khuzestan province, Iran. At the 2006 census, its population was 162, in 32 families.
