= Seyyed Nasir ol Din Mohammad =

Seyyed Nasir ol Din Mohammad سيدنصرالدين محمد
- Village
- Location within Iran
- Coordinates: 30°22′12″N 50°09′57″E
- Country: Iran
- Province: Khuzestan
- County: Behbahan
- Bakhsh: Zeydun
- Rural District: Sardasht

Population (2006)
  - Total: 52
- Time zone: UTC+3:30 (IRST)
  - Summer (DST): UTC+4:30 (IRDT)

Seyyed Nasir ol Din Mohammad (Persian: سيدنصرالدين محمد, also Romanized as Seyyed Naşīr ol Dīn Moḩammad, Seyyed Naşīr ed Dīn Moḩammad, and Seyyed Naşīr od Dīn Moḩammad; also known as Emāmzādeh Seyyed Naşīr od Dīn Moḩammad) is a village in Sardasht Rural District, Zeydun District, Behbahan County, Khuzestan Province, Iran. At the 2006 census, its population was 52, in 14 families.
