= Qaleh Timi =

Qaleh Timi قلعه تيمي
- Village
- Location within Iran
- Coordinates: 30°27′19″N 49°55′52″E
- Country: Iran
- Province: Khuzestan
- County: Behbahan
- Bakhsh: Zeydun
- Rural District: Dorunak

Population (2006)
  - Total: 77
- Time zone: UTC+3:30 (IRST)
  - Summer (DST): UTC+4:30 (IRDT)

Qaleh Timi (Persian: قلعه تيمي, also Romanized as Qal‘eh Tīmī; also known as Qal‘eh Temī) is a village in Dorunak Rural District, Zeydun District, Behbahan County, Khuzestan Province, Iran. At the 2006 census, its population was 77, in 21 families.
