= Cham Karteh =

Cham Karteh چم كرته
- Village
- Location within Iran
- Coordinates: 30°29′36″N 49°57′32″E
- Country: Iran
- Province: Khuzestan
- County: Behbahan
- Bakhsh: Zeydun
- Rural District: Dorunak

Population (2006)
  - Total: 286
- Time zone: UTC+3:30 (IRST)
  - Summer (DST): UTC+4:30 (IRDT)

Cham Karteh (Persian: چم كرته, also Romanized as Cham Kerteh; also known as Chamkarda) is a village in Dorunak Rural District, Zeydun District, Behbahan County, Khuzestan Province, Iran. At the 2006 census, its population was 286, in 58 families.
