= Salameh-ye Sofla =

Salameh-ye Sofla سلامه سفلي
- Village
- Location within Iran
- Coordinates: 30°26′15″N 50°01′34″E
- Country: Iran
- Province: Khuzestan
- County: Behbahan
- Bakhsh: Zeydun
- Rural District: Dorunak

Population (2006)
  - Total: 70
- Time zone: UTC+3:30 (IRST)
  - Summer (DST): UTC+4:30 (IRDT)

Salameh-ye Sofla (Persian: سلامه سفلي, also Romanized as Salāmeh-ye Soflá and Salāmeh Soflá; also known as Salāmat, Salāmeh, and Salāmeh-ye Pā’īn) is a village in Dorunak Rural District, Zeydun District, Behbahan County, Khuzestan Province, Iran. At the 2006 census, its population was 70, in 14 families.
