= Khvajeh Khezr =

Khvajeh Khezr خواجه خضر
- Village
- Location within Iran
- Coordinates: 30°21′04″N 50°02′06″E
- Country: Iran
- Province: Khuzestan
- County: Behbahan
- Bakhsh: Zeydun
- Rural District: Dorunak

Population (2006)
  - Total: 172
- Time zone: UTC+3:30 (IRST)
  - Summer (DST): UTC+4:30 (IRDT)

Khvajeh Khezr (Persian: خواجه خضر, also Romanized as Khvājeh Kheẕr) is a village in Dorunak Rural District, Zeydun District, Behbahan County, Khuzestan Province, Iran. At the 2006 census, its population was 172, in 42 families.
