= Lahbid =

Lahbid له بيد
- Village
- Location within Iran
- Coordinates: 30°22′34″N 49°59′34″E
- Country: Iran
- Province: Khuzestan
- County: Behbahan
- Bakhsh: Zeydun
- Rural District: Dorunak

Population (2006)
  - Total: 118
- Time zone: UTC+3:30 (IRST)
  - Summer (DST): UTC+4:30 (IRDT)

Lahbid (Persian: له بيد, also Romanized as Lahbīd) is a village in Dorunak Rural District, Zeydun District, Behbahan County, Khuzestan Province, Iran. At the 2006 census, its population was 118, in 22 families.
