= Takht-e Ali Zali =

Takht-e Ali Zali تخت علي زالي
- Village
- Country: Iran
- Province: Khuzestan
- County: Behbahan
- Bakhsh: Zeydun
- Rural District: Sardasht

Population (2006)
  - Total: 36
- Time zone: UTC+3:30 (IRST)
  - Summer (DST): UTC+4:30 (IRDT)

Takht-e Ali Zali (Persian: تخت علي زالي, also Romanized as Takht-e ʿAlī Zālī) is a village in Sardasht Rural District, Zeydun District, Behbahan County, Khuzestan Province, Iran. At the 2006 census, its population was 36, in 4 families.
