= Abdikhani =

Abdikhani عبدي خاني
- Village
- Location within Iran
- Coordinates: 30°28′42″N 49°56′16″E
- Country: Iran
- Province: Khuzestan
- County: Behbahan
- Bakhsh: Zeydun
- Rural District: Dorunak

Population (2006)
  - Total: 255
- Time zone: UTC+3:30 (IRST)
  - Summer (DST): UTC+4:30 (IRDT)

Abdikhani (Persian: عبدي خاني, also Romanized as ‘Abdīkhānī and ‘Abdī Khānī; also known as ‘Abdū Khānī) is a village in Dorunak Rural District, Zeydun District, Behbahan County, Khuzestan Province, Iran. At the 2006 census, its population was 255, in 61 families.
