= Zeydun =

Zeydun (Persian: زیدون) may refer to:

- Zeydun, Bushehr
- Zeydun District, in Khuzestan Province

== See also ==
- Zaidan (disambiguation)
- Zeydan (disambiguation)
