= Maani =

Maani is a surname. Notable people with the surname include:

- Fauoa Maani, Tuvaluan politician
- Iraj Maani (born 1985), Iranian mountaineer
- Omar Maani, Jordanian mayor
- Sholeh Maani, New Zealand economics academic

== See also ==
- Ma'n dynasty (alternatively spelled Ma'an), also known as the Ma'nids, a family of Druze chiefs of Arab stock based in the rugged Chouf area of southern Mount Lebanon
  - Fakhr al-Din II or Fakhr al-Din ibn Qurqumaz ibn Yunus Ma'n, Druze emir of Mount Lebanon known as Fakhr al-Dinal Ma'ni
- Vanguard of the Maani Army (Movement of the Druze Jihad)
