= Dar Bahareh =

Dar Bahareh داربهاره
- Village
- Location within Iran
- Coordinates: 30°27′14″N 49°55′12″E
- Country: Iran
- Province: Khuzestan
- County: Behbahan
- Bakhsh: Zeydun
- Rural District: Dorunak

Population (2006)
  - Total: 165
- Time zone: UTC+3:30 (IRST)
  - Summer (DST): UTC+4:30 (IRDT)

Dar Bahareh (Persian: داربهاره, also Romanized as Dār Bahāreh) is a village in Dorunak Rural District, Zeydun District, Behbahan County, Khuzestan Province, Iran. At the 2006 census, its population was 165, in 39 families.
