= Cheshmeh Sheykh =

Cheshmeh Sheykh چشمه شيخ
- Village
- Location within Iran
- Coordinates: 30°25′52″N 49°58′38″E
- Country: Iran
- Province: Khuzestan
- County: Behbahan
- Bakhsh: Zeydun
- Rural District: Dorunak

Population (2006)
  - Total: 162
- Time zone: UTC+3:30 (IRST)
  - Summer (DST): UTC+4:30 (IRDT)

Cheshmeh Sheykh (Persian: چشمه شيخ, also Romanized as Chashmeh Sheykh; also known as Chasmeh Sheykh) is a village in Dorunak Rural District, Zeydun District, Behbahan County, Khuzestan Province, Iran. At the 2006 census, its population was 162, in 34 families.
