= Tall Gavineh =

Tall Gavineh تل گوينه
- Village
- Location within Iran
- Coordinates: 30°20′12″N 50°06′02″E
- Country: Iran
- Province: Khuzestan
- County: Behbahan
- Bakhsh: Zeydun
- Rural District: Dorunak

Population (2006)
  - Total: 291
- Time zone: UTC+3:30 (IRST)
  - Summer (DST): UTC+4:30 (IRDT)

Tall Gavineh (Persian: تل گوينه, also Romanized as Tall Gavīneh and Tol Gavīneh) is a village in Dorunak Rural District, Zeydun District, Behbahan County, Khuzestan Province, Iran. At the 2006 census, its population was 291, in 59 families.
