= Borj-e Yusefi =

Borj-e Yusefi برج يوسفي
- Village
- Location within Iran
- Coordinates: 30°21′30″N 50°10′38″E
- Country: Iran
- Province: Khuzestan
- County: Behbahan
- Bakhsh: Zeydun
- Rural District: Sardasht

Population (2006)
  - Total: 137
- Time zone: UTC+3:30 (IRST)
  - Summer (DST): UTC+4:30 (IRDT)

Borj-e Yusefi (Persian: برج يوسفي, also Romanized as Borj-e Yūsefī, Borj Yūsefī, and Borj Yūsofī) is a village in Sardasht Rural District, Zeydun District, Behbahan County, Khuzestan Province, Iran. At the 2006 census, its population was 137, in 29 families.
