= Julahi =

Julahi جولاهي
- Village
- Location within Iran
- Coordinates: 30°21′33″N 50°02′01″E
- Country: Iran
- Province: Khuzestan
- County: Behbahan
- Bakhsh: Zeydun
- Rural District: Dorunak

Population (2006)
  - Total: 112
- Time zone: UTC+3:30 (IRST)
  - Summer (DST): UTC+4:30 (IRDT)

Julahi (Persian: جولاهي, also Romanized as Jūlāhī, Jūlā’ī, and Jūle’ī) is a village in Dorunak Rural District, Zeydun District, Behbahan County, Khuzestan Province, Iran. At the 2006 census, its population was 112, in 27 families.
