= Tall-e Gorosneh =

Tall-e Gorosneh تل گرسنه
- Village
- Location within Iran
- Coordinates: 30°19′17″N 50°09′57″E
- Country: Iran
- Province: Khuzestan
- County: Behbahan
- Bakhsh: Zeydun
- Rural District: Dorunak

Population (2006)
  - Total: 136
- Time zone: UTC+3:30 (IRST)
  - Summer (DST): UTC+4:30 (IRDT)

Tall-e Gorosneh (Persian: تل گرسنه) is a village in Dorunak Rural District, Zeydun District, Behbahan County, Khuzestan Province, Iran. At the 2006 census, its population was 136, in 30 families.
