= Longir-e Sofla =

Longir-e Sofla لنگيرسفلي
- Village
- Location within Iran
- Coordinates: 30°27′56″N 49°59′21″E
- Country: Iran
- Province: Khuzestan
- County: Behbahan
- Bakhsh: Zeydun
- Rural District: Dorunak

Population (2006)
  - Total: 304
- Time zone: UTC+3:30 (IRST)
  - Summer (DST): UTC+4:30 (IRDT)

Longir-e Sofla (Persian: لنگيرسفلي, also Romanized as Longīr-e Soflá and Longīr Soflá; also known as Longīr and Longīr-e Pā’īn) is a village in Dorunak Rural District, Zeydun District, Behbahan County, Khuzestan Province, Iran. At the 2006 census, its population was 304, in 64 families.
