= Tall Chegah-e Sofla =

Tall Chegah-e Sofla تل چگاه سفلي
- Village
- Location within Iran
- Coordinates: 30°19′29″N 50°08′31″E
- Country: Iran
- Province: Khuzestan
- County: Behbahan
- Bakhsh: Zeydun
- Rural District: Dorunak

Population (2006)
  - Total: 142
- Time zone: UTC+3:30 (IRST)
  - Summer (DST): UTC+4:30 (IRDT)

Tall Chegah-e Sofla (Persian: تل چگاه سفلي, also Romanized as Tall Chegāh-e Soflá and Tal Chegāh-e Soflá; also known as Tal Chegāh-e Pā’īn, Tal Chekā-ye Pā’īn, and Tol Chegāh-e Pā’īn) is a village in Dorunak Rural District, Zeydun District, Behbahan County, Khuzestan Province, Iran. At the 2006 census, its population was 142, in 36 families.
