= Abazar, Khuzestan =

Abazar اباذر
- Village
- Location within Iran
- Coordinates: 30°19′15″N 50°13′48″E
- Country: Iran
- Province: Khuzestan
- County: Behbahan
- Bakhsh: Zeydun
- Rural District: Sardasht

Population (2006)
  - Total: 402
- Time zone: UTC+3:30 (IRST)
  - Summer (DST): UTC+4:30 (IRDT)

Abazar (Persian: اباذر, also Romanized as Abāz̄ar; also known as Abū Z̄ar, Abūz̄ar, Emāmzādeh Zeydān, and Imāmzādeh Zaidān) is a village in Sardasht Rural District, Zeydun District, Behbahan County, Khuzestan Province, Iran. At the 2006 census, its population was 402, in 85 families.
