= Sholeh-ye Zardu =

Coordinates: 30°13′39″N 50°26′31″E

Sholeh-ye Zardu شله زاردو
- Village
- Interactive map of Sholeh-ye Zardu
- Country: Iran
- Province: Khuzestan
- County: Behbahan
- Bakhsh: Zeydun
- Rural District: Sardasht

Population (2006)
  - Total: 274
- Time zone: UTC+3:30 (IRST)
  - Summer (DST): UTC+4:30 (IRDT)

Sholeh-ye Zardu (Persian: شله زاردو, also romanized as Sholeh-ye Zārdū) is a village in Sardasht Rural District, Zeydun District, Behbahan County, Khuzestan Province, Iran. At the 2006 census, its population was 274, in 59 families.
