= Longir-e Olya =

Longir-e Olya لنگيرعليا
- Village
- Location within Iran
- Coordinates: 30°27′00″N 50°00′04″E
- Country: Iran
- Province: Khuzestan
- County: Behbahan
- Bakhsh: Zeydun
- Rural District: Dorunak

Population (2006)
  - Total: 628
- Time zone: UTC+3:30 (IRST)
  - Summer (DST): UTC+4:30 (IRDT)

Longir-e Olya (Persian: لنگيرعليا, also Romanized as Longīr-e ‘Olyā and Longīr ‘Olyā; also known as Longīr, Longīr-e Bālā, and Lunjir) is a village in Dorunak Rural District, Zeydun District, Behbahan County, Khuzestan Province, Iran. At the 2006 census, its population was 628, in 142 families.
