= Longir-e Vosta =

Longir-e Vosta لنگيروسطي
- Village
- Location within Iran
- Coordinates: 30°27′21″N 50°00′01″E
- Country: Iran
- Province: Khuzestan
- County: Behbahan
- Bakhsh: Zeydun
- Rural District: Dorunak

Population (2006)
  - Total: 552
- Time zone: UTC+3:30 (IRST)
  - Summer (DST): UTC+4:30 (IRDT)

Longir-e Vosta (Persian: لنگيروسطي, also Romanized as Longīr-e Vosţá and Longīr-e Vostá; also known as Longīr-e Mīānī) is a village in Dorunak Rural District, Zeydun District, Behbahan County, Khuzestan Province, Iran. At the 2006 census, its population was 552, in 118 families.
