= Qaleh Dezh, Khuzestan =

Qaleh Dezh قلعه دژ
- Village
- Location within Iran
- Coordinates: 30°18′21″N 50°14′50″E
- Country: Iran
- Province: Khuzestan
- County: Behbahan
- Bakhsh: Zeydun
- Rural District: Sardasht

Population (2006)
  - Total: 60
- Time zone: UTC+3:30 (IRST)
  - Summer (DST): UTC+4:30 (IRDT)

Qaleh Dezh (Persian: قلعه دژ, also Romanized as Qal‘eh Dezh) is a village in Sardasht Rural District, Zeydun District, Behbahan County, Khuzestan Province, Iran. At the 2006 census, its population was 60, in 13 families.
