= Tall Chegah-e Olya =

Tall Chegah-e Olya تل چگاه عليا
- Village
- Location within Iran
- Coordinates: 30°18′39″N 50°11′47″E
- Country: Iran
- Province: Khuzestan
- County: Behbahan
- Bakhsh: Zeydun
- Rural District: Sardasht

Population (2006)
  - Total: 308
- Time zone: UTC+3:30 (IRST)
  - Summer (DST): UTC+4:30 (IRDT)

Tall Chegah-e Olya (Persian: تل چگاه عليا, also Romanized as Tall Chegāh-e ‘Olyā; also known as Tal Chegāh, Tal Chekā-ye Bālā, Tol Chegāh, and Tol Chegāh-e Bālā) is a village in Sardasht Rural District, Zeydun District, Behbahan County, Khuzestan Province, Iran. At the 2006 census, its population was 308, in 66 families.
