= Qaleh Kabi =

Village in Khuzestan province, Iran

Qaleh Kabi Persian: قلعه كعبي
- Village
- Location within Iran
- Coordinates: 30°23′23″N 50°07′39″E
- Country: Iran
- Province: Khuzestan
- County: Behbahan
- District: Zeydun
- Rural District: Sardasht

Population (2016)
  - Total: 963
- Time zone: UTC+3:30 (IRST)

Qaleh Kabi (Persian: قلعه كعبي) (Note: Also romanized as Qal‘eh Ka‘bī and Qal‘eh Kabī) is a village in Sardasht Rural District of Zeydun District, Behbahan County, Khuzestan province, Iran.

== Demographics ==
=== Population ===
At the time of the 2006 National Census, the village's population was 1,124 in 226 households. The following census in 2011 counted 1,140 people in 292 households. The 2016 census measured the population of the village as 963 people in 269 households. It was the most populous village in its rural district.
