= Zaidan =

Zaidan may refer to:

- Zayd (name)
- Zahedan, a city in Iran
- Zaidan, Khuzestan, a village in Iran
- Abdallah Elias Zaidan, Maronite bishop in the United States

== See also ==
- Zeydan (disambiguation)
- Zeydun (disambiguation)
