= Sholeh-ye Zarik =

Coordinates: 30°14′06″N 50°26′38″E

Sholeh-ye Zarik شله زاريك
- Village
- Interactive map of Sholeh-ye Zarik
- Country: Iran
- Province: Khuzestan
- County: Behbahan
- Bakhsh: Zeydun
- Rural District: Sardasht

Population (2006)
  - Total: 324
- Time zone: UTC+3:30 (IRST)
  - Summer (DST): UTC+4:30 (IRDT)

Sholeh-ye Zarik (Persian: شله زاريك, also Romanized as Sholeh-ye Zārīḵ) is a village in Sardasht Rural District, Zeydun District, Behbahan County, Khuzestan Province, Iran. At the 2006 census, its population was 324, in 68 families.
