= Abu Zar =

Abu Zar (Persian: اباذر or ابوذر) may refer to:

- Abu Dharr al-Ghifari (died 652), also known as Abu Zar, an early companion of Muhammad
- Abazar, Khuzestan (Persian: اباذر) also romanized as Abū Z̄ar, a village in Iran
