= People's Republic of Tyre =

People's Republic of Tyre جمهورية صور الشعبية (Arabic)} Jumhūriyyat Ṣūr al-Ša'biyya
- 1976
- Status: Paramilitary-controlled territory
- Capital: Tyre
- Common languages: Arabic
- Religion: Islam

Government
  - Governed by: LAA & PLO
- Historical era: Lebanese Civil War
  - Established: 1976
  - Disestablished: 1976
- Currency: Lebanese Pound
Preceded by	Succeeded by
Lebanon	Lebanon
- Today part of: Lebanon

The People's Republic of Tyre (Arabic: جمهورية صور الشعبية, Jumhūriyyat Ṣūr al-Ša'biyya) was a short-lived, PLO controlled administration during the Lebanese Civil War. It was formed in early 1976 after the full takeover of the city of Tyre in the south of Lebanon by the Palestine Liberation Organization and the Lebanese Arab Army.

== Background ==
In February 1975, Tyre saw pro-PLO and anti-government demonstrations after Arab Nationalist MP and PNO leader, Maarouf Saad, had been killed in Sidon, allegedly by the army. Then, in early March 1975, a PLO commando of eight militants sailed from the coast of Tyre to Tel Aviv to mount the Savoy Hotel attack, during which eight civilian hostages and three Israeli soldiers were killed as well as seven of the attackers. Five months later - on 5 August 1975 - Israel attacked Tyre "from land, sea and air". More assaults followed on 16 and 29 August, as well as on 3 September.

== PLO and LAA takeover of Tyre ==
In 1976, local commanders of the PLO took over the municipal government of Tyre with support from their allies of the Arab Socialist Action Party – Lebanon (ASAP–L) and Lebanese Arab Army (LAA). They occupied the army barracks, set up roadblocks and started collecting customs at the port. Parts of Kazem al-Khalil's estate were confiscated as well. Most of the funding, according to Robert Fisk, came from Iraq though, while arms and ammunition were provided by Libya.

The new rulers thus declared the founding of the "People's Republic of Tyre". However, they quickly lost support from the local population because of their "arbitrary and often brutal behavior". Even Tyre's veteran politician Jafar Sharafeddin was quoted criticising the PLO for "its violations and sabotage of the Palestinian cause".
