= Dorunak, Khuzestan =

Village in Khuzestan province, Iran

Dorunak Persian: درونك
- Village
- Location within Iran
- Coordinates: 30°21′25″N 50°03′28″E
- Country: Iran
- Province: Khuzestan
- County: Behbahan
- District: Zeydun
- Rural District: Dorunak

Population (2016)
  - Total: 684
- Time zone: UTC+3:30 (IRST)

Dorunak (Persian: درونك) (Note: Also romanized as Darunak, Darūnak and Dorūnak; also known as Dow Rūnak and Durunak) is a village in, and the capital of, Dorunak Rural District of Zeydun District, Behbahan County, Khuzestan province, Iran.

== Demographics ==
=== Population ===
At the time of the 2006 National Census, the village's population was 722 in 168 households. The following census in 2011 counted 728 people in 191 households. The 2016 census measured the population of the village as 684 people in 190 households. It was the most populous village in its rural district.
