= Al-Ahdab coup =

1976 Lebanese coup attempt
- Part of Lebanese Civil War
| Date | 11 March 1976; 50 years ago |
| Location | Lebanon |
| Result | Failure of the coup attempt |

Belligerents
| Lebanese Government | Dissenting faction of the armed forces |

Commanders and leaders
| Suleiman Frangieh | Aziz Al-Ahdab |

The Al-Ahdab Coup (also known as the Television Coup) was an attempted white coup (bloodless) led by the Sunni Brigadier General Aziz Al-Ahdab, then the military commander of the Beirut region, on the evening of March 11, 1976. He infiltrated the Lebanese state television station and read "Statement No. 1" live on air, describing his movement as reformist and aimed at saving and unifying the Lebanese Army which had been divided amidst the Lebanese Civil War. He called on President Suleiman Frangieh to resign in preparation for the election of a new president. However, Ahdeb disappeared after a few hours, with his attempt failed, and his statement deemed "the first and last statement."

== Background ==
Following the outbreak of the Lebanese Civil War in 1975, the Lebanese Army disintegrated, and military barracks fell in many areas. This period also saw the rise of Lieutenant Ahmed Al-Khatib, who declared the formation of the Lebanese Arab Army after rebelling against the leadership on January 21, 1976. Al-Khatib, along with a group of defecting soldiers, attacked barracks with financial and logistical support from Palestinian factions, ultimately seizing military installations across several regions in Lebanon.

This deteriorating situation prompted Brigadier General Aziz Al-Ahdeb, the military commander of the Beirut region, to announce "Statement No. 1" from the Télé Liban TV station in Telat Al-Khayyat at 8:30 PM on March 11, 1976, coinciding with the evening news broadcast. Seated with a pistol on the table, Al-Ahdeb described his movement as reformist, aimed at saving the army and restoring its cohesion. He demanded that President Suleiman Frangieh resign to pave the way for the election of a new president within ten days and declared a state of emergency in Lebanon, imposing a curfew in Beirut.

Al-Ahdeb’s reformist movement initially received support from political circles and some officers. However, the commander of the army, Hanna Saeed, remained silent. The coup did not gain the backing of the combat units, most of which had joined Ahmed Al-Khatib. In response, the militias of the Lebanese Front occupied the Fayadieh barracks on March 12, 1976. Colonel Antoine Barakat from Zgharta declared his loyalty to President Suleiman Frangieh on the same day, founding what became known as the "Legitimacy Army," headquartered at the Fayadieh barracks. Additionally, a gathering of soldiers at the Sarba barracks was led by Colonel Antoine Lahad, who left the Bekaa command to join his colleagues in Christian areas. Another group, led by Major Ibrahim Tannous (later commander of the army), Major Tarek Najem, and Lieutenant Yusuf Al-Tahan, was formed in Zahle.

== Statement No. 1 ==
The text of "Statement No. 1" read as follows:

To save the unity of the army, restore cohesion among its members, and rescue the deteriorating situation in the country, as continuous warnings have gone unheeded, and to safeguard Lebanon’s supreme interest and restore unity among the honorable Lebanese people, and inspired by my conscience, military principles, and my responsibility before God and history, I declare the following:

1. I request that His Excellency the President of the Republic, for the sake of Lebanese unity, emulate his predecessor, Sheikh Bechara El Khoury, and submit his resignation from the presidency. Otherwise, he will be considered as having effectively resigned.
2. I request the Lebanese government to resign within 24 hours; otherwise, it will be considered as having effectively resigned.
3. I call on all civilian and military sectors to support my reformist movement and maintain calm under penalty of accountability.
4. I declare a state of emergency in the country and impose a curfew in Beirut until further notice.
5. I call on the Parliament to elect a new president within seven days of this statement.
6. I urge the newly elected president to form a new government immediately upon election.
7. I request all general directors to ensure work continues in their ministries as usual.
8. I order all armed forces to immediately fire upon anyone attempting acts of looting or chaos under penalty of accountability.
9. I support the appeal of the Army Commander, addressed to military personnel on March 10, 1976.
10. I fully support the Syrian brotherly initiative to rescue the country from the disastrous crisis it is entangled in due to conflicting factions.
11. I affirm the army’s commitment to protecting President Frangieh for life.
12. I declare my lack of interest in ruling, as I do not believe in military rule except as a means to save a collapsing regime. Therefore, I will retain my position as the commander of the Beirut region and will hand over power to its rightful owners immediately after the election of a new president.

May God guide our actions. He is the best master and supporter.

Beirut, March 11, 1976

Brigadier General Aziz Al-Ahdeb, Commander of the Beirut Region and Interim Military Governor.

== See also ==
- Army of Free Lebanon
- Lebanese Arab Army
- Lebanese Civil War
