= Arab Socialist Action Party – Lebanon =

Arab Socialist Action Party – Lebanon حزب العمل الاشتراكي العربي - لبنان
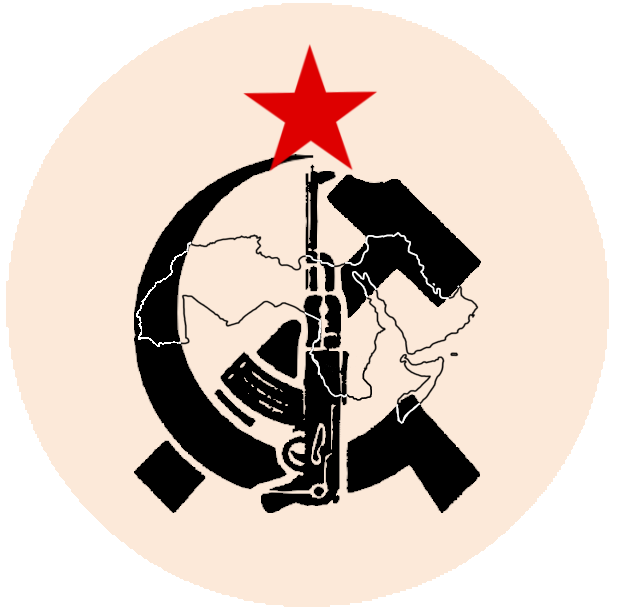
- Secretary-General: Hussein Hamdan
- Founders: George Habash
- Founded: 1969
- Newspaper: Tariq al-Thawrah
- Ideology: Marxism; Anti-Zionism; Pan-Arabism
- International affiliation: Arab Socialist Action Party

Party flag

The Arab Socialist Action Party – Lebanon or ASAP–L (Arabic: حزب العمل الاشتراكي العربي - لبنان | Hizb al-'Amal al-Ishtiraki al-'Arabi - Lubnan), is the Lebanese branch of the Arab Socialist Action Party. The party is the Lebanese equivalent of the Popular Front for the Liberation of Palestine (PFLP).

== Origins ==
The ASAP–L was founded by George Habash in 1969 and was closely linked to the PFLP, which Habash also led. The party held its first congress in 1972, during which it distanced itself from other communists by advocating violence as the best means by which to end class conflict. Although a secular group, most of the party's membership came from the Shia Muslim community.

== Military structure and organization ==
Arab Socialist Action Party – Lebanon حزب العمل الاشتراكي العربي - لبنان
- Flag of the Arab Socialist Action Party Lebanon militia (1975–1991)
- Leader: Hussein Hamdan
- Dates active: 1975–1991
- Headquarters: West Beirut
- Active regions: Lebanon
- Size: 2,500 fighters
- Part of: Lebanese National Movement; Lebanese National Resistance Front
- Wars: Lebanese Civil War

== The ASAP–L in the Lebanese Civil War ==
The ASAP–L was a member of both the Lebanese National Movement (LNM) and its successor, the Lebanese National Resistance Front (LNRF) during the Lebanese Civil War. In 1976, the party confiscated the estates of the Shia za'im (political boss) Kazem al-Khalil at a village near Tyre. The purpose of the confiscation was to turn the estates into a collective; but the ASAP–L soon lost control of the estates in the wake of the June 1982 Israeli invasion of Lebanon.

The party's leader Hussein Hamdan took part in the founding of the LNRF, along with George Hawi of the Lebanese Communist Party (LCP) and Mohsen Ibrahim of the Organization of Communist Action in Lebanon (OCAL).

== Illegal activities and controversy ==
The ASAP–L was also involved in January 1976 in the founding of the so-called People's Republic of Tyre (Arabic: جمهورية صور الشعبية| Jumhūriyya Ṣūr al-Ša'biyya), a short-lived autonomous Canton formed that same month at the port city of Tyre in Southern Lebanon. With the active support of their ASAP–L and Lebanese Arab Army (LAA) allies, local Palestine Liberation Organization (PLO) commanders took over the municipal government of the city, proclaimed the "People's Republic of Tyre", occupied the Lebanese Army's Adloun and Benoit Barakat Barracks, set up roadblocks and started collecting customs at the port. However, the joint PLO-LAA-ASAP–L "People's Republic of Tyre" government quickly lost the political support of the local population, mostly due to their "arbitrary and often brutal behavior".

== See also ==
- Lebanese Civil War
- Lebanese National Movement
- Lebanese National Resistance Front

== Bibliography ==
- Robert Fisk, Pity the Nation: Lebanon at War, London: Oxford University Press, (3rd ed. 2001). ISBN 0-19-280130-9 –
- Tom Najem and Roy C. Amore, Historical Dictionary of Lebanon, Second Edition, Historical Dictionaries of Asia, Oceania, and the Middle East, Rowman & Littlefield Publishers, Lanham, Boulder, New York & London 2021. ISBN 9781538120439, 1538120437
- Wade R. Goria, Sovereignty and Leadership in Lebanon, 1943–76, Ithaca Press, London 1985. ISBN 978-0863720314
- Who's Who in Lebanon 2007–2008, Publitec Publications & De Gruyter Saur, Beirut / Munich 2007. ISBN 978-3-598-07734-0
- Ze'ev Schiff and Ehud Ya'ari, Israel's Lebanon War, Simon and Schuster, New York 1985. ISBN 978-0671602161 –
