= Cham, Behbahan =

Cham چم
- Village
- Location within Iran
- Coordinates: 30°20′35″N 50°10′01″E
- Country: Iran
- Province: Khuzestan
- County: Behbahan
- Bakhsh: Zeydun
- Rural District: Sardasht

Population (2006)
  - Total: 404
- Time zone: UTC+3:30 (IRST)
  - Summer (DST): UTC+4:30 (IRDT)

Cham (Persian: چم; also known as Cham-e Zeydūn, Cham Zeydūn, Zaidān, and Zeydān) is a village in Sardasht Rural District, Zeydun District, Behbahan County, Khuzestan Province, Iran. At the 2006 census, its population was 404, in 89 families.
