= Sardasht, Khuzestan =

City in Khuzestan province, Iran

Sardasht Persian: سردشت
- City
- Location within Iran
- Coordinates: 30°19′37″N 50°13′08″E
- Country: Iran
- Province: Khuzestan
- County: Behbahan
- District: Zeydun

Population (2016)
  - Total: 6,912
- Time zone: UTC+3:30 (IRST)

Sardasht (Persian: سردشت) (Note: Also romanized as Sar Dasht and Sār Dasht; also known as Sardasht-e Zeydūn) is a city in, and the capital of, Zeydun District of Behbahan County, Khuzestan province, Iran. It also serves as the administrative center for Sardasht Rural District.

== Demographics ==
=== Population ===
At the time of the 2006 National Census, the city's population was 4,972 in 1,074 households. The following census in 2011 counted 6,239 people in 1,654 households. The 2016 census measured the population of the city as 6,912 people in 2,004 households.
