= Qaleh-ye Dezh Nargesi =

Village in Kohgiluyeh and Boyer-Ahmad, Iran

Qaleh-ye Dezh Nargesi قلعه دژنرگسي
- Village
- Location within Iran
- Coordinates: 30°40′58″N 50°38′37″E
- Country: Iran
- Province: Kohgiluyeh and Boyer-Ahmad
- County: Kohgiluyeh
- Bakhsh: Central
- Rural District: Dehdasht-e Gharbi

Population (2006)
  - Total: 59
- Time zone: UTC+3:30 (IRST)
  - Summer (DST): UTC+4:30 (IRDT)

Qaleh-ye Dezh Nargesi (Persian: قلعه دژنرگسي, also Romanized as Qal‘eh-ye Dezh Nargesī; also known as Qal‘eh-ye Dezh) is a village in Dehdasht-e Gharbi Rural District, in the Central District of Kohgiluyeh County, Kohgiluyeh and Boyer-Ahmad Province, Iran. At the 2006 census, its population was 59, in 11 families.
