= Tal-e Chegah, Kohgiluyeh and Boyer-Ahmad =

Tal-e Chegah تل چگاه
- Village
- Location within Iran
- Coordinates: 30°48′38″N 50°38′19″E
- Country: Iran
- Province: Kohgiluyeh and Boyer-Ahmad
- County: Kohgiluyeh
- Bakhsh: Central
- Rural District: Dehdasht-e Sharqi

Population (2006)
  - Total: 93
- Time zone: UTC+3:30 (IRST)
  - Summer (DST): UTC+4:30 (IRDT)

Tal-e Chegah (Persian: تل چگاه, also Romanized as Tal-e Chegāh) is a village in Dehdasht-e Sharqi Rural District, in the Central District of Kohgiluyeh County, Kohgiluyeh and Boyer-Ahmad Province, Iran. At the 2006 census, its population was 93, in 14 families.
