= Vanguard of the Maani Army (Movement of the Druze Jihad) =

Right Wing Lebanese Druze militia active during the Lebanese Civil War

Vanguard of the Maani Army (Movement of the Druze Jihad) – VMA (MDJ) طليعة جيش المعاني (حركة الجهاد الدرزي)
- Flag of the Druze people variant
- Leaders: Farid Hamadeh, Raouf Abdel-Salam, Wahib Abdel-Salam
- Dates active: 1976–1978
- Headquarters: Chouf District
- Active regions: Chouf District, Mount Lebanon, East Beirut
- Ideology: Lebanese nationalism Anti-communism; Anti-Palestinianism; Conservatism; Druze minority interests
- Political position: Right-wing
- Size: 200 fighters
- Part of: Lebanese Front
- Wars: Lebanese Civil War

The Vanguard of the Maani Army (Movement of the Druze Jihad) – VMA (MDJ) (Arabic: طليعة جيش المعاني (حركة الجهاد الدرزي) | Taleat Jayish al-Maani (Harakat al-Jihad al-Duruzi)) was a predominantly Druze splinter faction of the Lebanese Army that came to play a role in the 1975–77 phase of the Lebanese Civil War.

== Origins ==
The VMA (MJD) was formed in October 1976, following the break-up early that same year of the Lebanese Army into four rival groups or factions, including a predominately Muslim faction, the Lebanese Arab Army (LAA), aligned with the left-wing Lebanese National Movement (LNM) and a mainly Christian faction, the Army of Free Lebanon (AFL) aligned in turn with the right-wing Lebanese Front.

The group's founder was the conservative Druze politician Farid Hamadeh who opposed the za'im (political boss) Kamal Jumblatt, leader of both the left-wing Progressive Socialist Party (PSP) and the LNM coalition. Closely linked to the Christian Lebanese Front coalition, the VMA (MJD)'s own manifesto claimed that their main goal was to rid Lebanon of the Palestinians and the 'communists' – meaning the Lebanese leftist parties and militias of the LNM, in addition to their allies of the Palestine Liberation Organization (PLO) guerrilla factions and the Palestinian refugees living in the country. The group's leadership also expressed its opposition to the Syrian military intervention of June 1976.

== Structure and organization ==
Based at the Chouf District, the VMA (MJD)' strength was estimated at about 100–200 Druze regular soldiers equipped with small-arms and military vehicles drawn from Lebanese Army depots and Internal Security Forces (ISF) Police stations. It was led by Druze junior officers from the Lebanese Army, such as Raouf Abdel-Salam and Wahib Abdel-Salam.

== List of VMA (MDJ) commanders ==
- Farid Hamadeh
- Raouf Abdel-Salam
- Wahib Abdel-Salam

== See also ==
- Lebanese Civil War
- List of extrajudicial killings and political violence in Lebanon
- Army of Free Lebanon
- Lebanese Arab Army
- Lebanese Druze
- Lebanese Front
- Lebanese Forces (militia)
- Lebanese National Movement
- List of weapons of the Lebanese Civil War
- Progressive Socialist Party
- People's Liberation Army (Lebanon)
