= Tal-e Chega =

Tal-e Chega تل چگا
- Village
- Location within Iran
- Coordinates: 30°32′25″N 50°57′46″E
- Country: Iran
- Province: Kohgiluyeh and Boyer-Ahmad
- County: Basht
- Bakhsh: Central
- Rural District: Kuh Mareh Khami

Population (2006)
  - Total: 139
- Time zone: UTC+3:30 (IRST)
  - Summer (DST): UTC+4:30 (IRDT)

Tal-e Chega (Persian: تل چگا, also Romanized as Tal-e Chegā; also known as Tal-e Chegāh, Tolchegāh, Tal Chekā and Tal Cheqā) is a village in Kuh Mareh Khami Rural District, in the Central District of Basht County, Kohgiluyeh and Boyer-Ahmad Province, Iran. At the 2006 census, its population was 139, in 35 families.
