= Dorunak, Fars =

Dorunak درونك
- Village
- Location within Iran
- Coordinates: 29°23′50″N 51°56′17″E
- Country: Iran
- Province: Fars
- County: Kazerun
- Bakhsh: Jereh and Baladeh
- Rural District: Famur

Population (2006)
  - Total: 359
- Time zone: UTC+3:30 (IRST)
  - Summer (DST): UTC+4:30 (IRDT)

Dorunak (Persian: درونك, also Romanized as Dorūnak, Darūnak, and Derūnak; also known as Darinak and Qal‘eh-ye Dorūnak) is a village in Famur Rural District, Jereh and Baladeh District, Kazerun County, Fars province, Iran. At the 2006 census, its population was 359, in 69 families.
