= Chtaura Park Hotel =

Hotel in Bekaa, Lebanon

Coordinates: 33.8190°N 35.8471°E

Chtaura Park Hotel فندق شتورة بارك
- Interactive map of the Chtaura Park Hotel فندق شتورة بارك area

General information
- Location: Bekaa Valley, Beqaa, Lebanon, PO Box 5, Zahle, Lebanon
- Opening: 1958

Website
- http://www.chtauraparkhotel.com

The Chtaura Park Hotel is a five-star hotel in Bekaa, Lebanon. The hotel lies in the Bekaa Valley between two mountain ranges at an altitude of 950 metres and half an hour's drive from Damascus across the border in Syria.

In 2008 renovation work began on the hotel and it was scheduled to be reopened in May 2009.
