= Qaleh Dezh, Hormozgan =

Village in Hormozgan, Iran

Qaleh Dezh قلعه دژ
- Village
- Location within Iran
- Coordinates: 27°46′16″N 57°11′59″E
- Country: Iran
- Province: Hormozgan
- County: Rudan
- Bakhsh: Rudkhaneh
- Rural District: Mosaferabad

Population (2006)
  - Total: 198
- Time zone: UTC+3:30 (IRST)
  - Summer (DST): UTC+4:30 (IRDT)

Qaleh Dezh (Persian: قلعه دژ, also Romanized as Qal‘eh Dezh and Qal‘eh-ye Dezh) is a village in Mosaferabad Rural District, Rudkhaneh District, Rudan County, Hormozgan Province, Iran. At the 2006 census, its population was 198, in 42 families.
