= Saviem SM8 =

Overview
- Manufacturer: Saviem
- Production: 1967–1975
- Assembly: Blainville-sur-Orne, France

Body and chassis
- Class: Medium truck
- Body style: COE

Powertrain
- Engine: 5.3/5.49L straight-six engine
- Transmission: 5-speed manual

Chronology
- Predecessor: Saviem S
- Successor: Saviem J

The Saviem SM8 (8-ton payload) was a range of medium-duty trucks manufactured by the French manufacturer Saviem between 1967 and 1975. The truck was part of the Saviem SM range.

== Characteristics ==
=== Dimensions ===
The cabin was a tip cab (Type 812). The range had a rigid form and two tractor units (SM8 T, SM8 Y). The wheelbases were between 3m and 5.3m.

=== Engines ===
The engine used for the SM8 (and also the SM7) was the 597/797, a naturally aspirated Diesel engine.

=== Transmission ===
A 5-speed (4 synchronised) 301-12 manual gearbox was mounted as standard.

=== Suspension ===
The SM8 had a suspension of leaf springs with dampers at the front and rear.

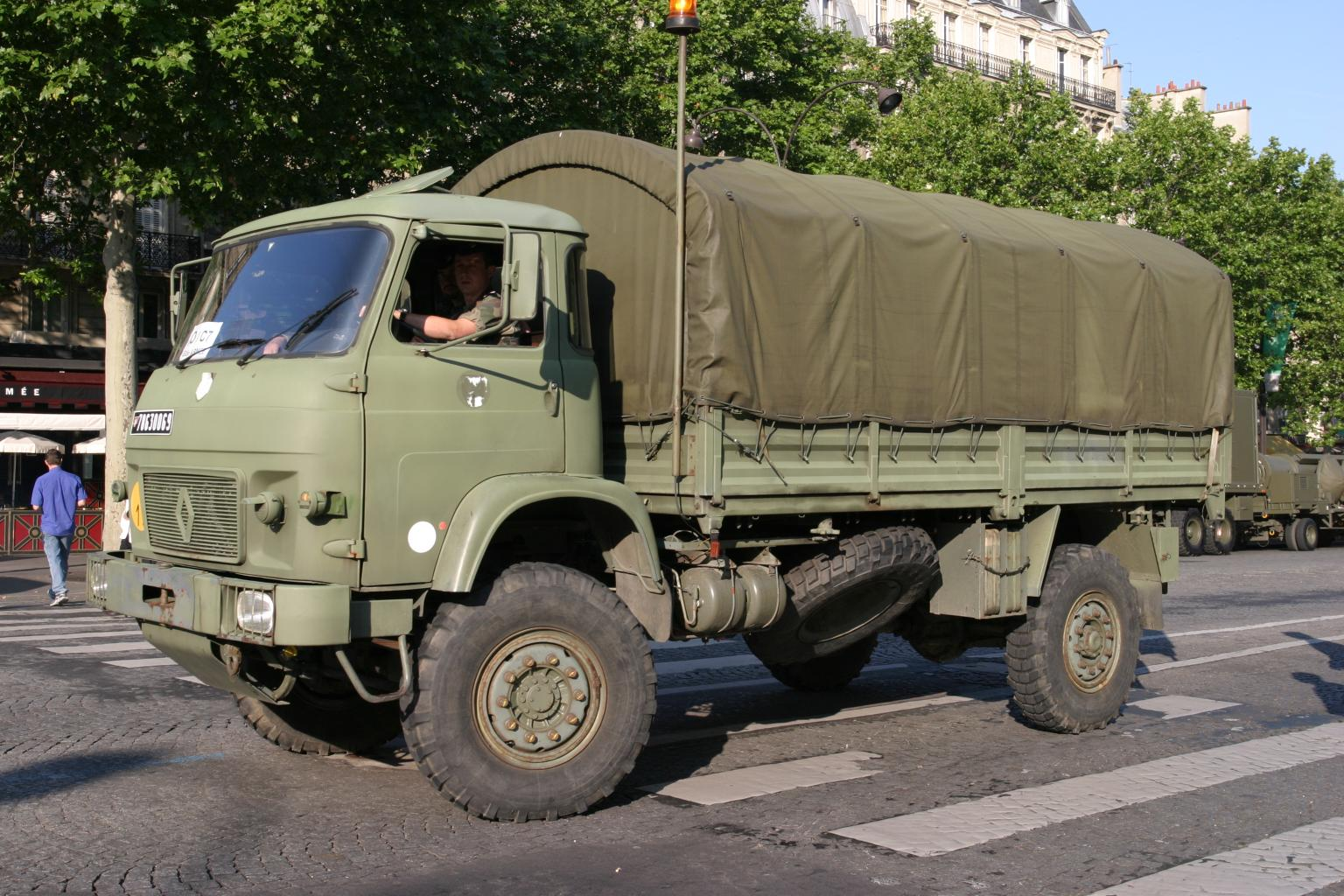
A Renault TRM4000.

== SM8 4x4 ==
The SM8 4x4 was the four-wheel-drive version of the SM8. It was used as an off-roader and military vehicle.

It was a permanent 4x4 with locking centre differential in the transfer case. The SM8 4x4 also had a differential lock on the rear axle. The truck had a variable flexibility suspension with Evidgom shock absorbers. It had single or dual rear wheels and two tip cabs available (pressed steel and torpedo).

The vehicle was manufactured between 1977 and 1989 by Saviem and RVI. It adopted the name Renault SM8 4x4 in 1980 and Renault TRM4000 in 1986.
