= Sholeh Maani =

New Zealand economics academic

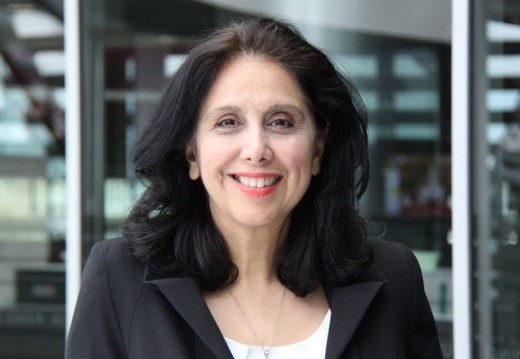

Academic background
- Education: University of Illinois at Urbana-Champaign

Academic work
- Discipline: Economics of the labour market Economics of education
- Institutions: University of Auckland

Sholeh Maani is a New Zealand economics academic. She is a full professor at the University of Auckland.

== Academic career ==
Maani is the first female Professor of Economics at the University of Auckland. She is a specialist in applied microeconomics, in particular the economics of the labour market, and the economics of education. Sholeh has a PhD degree in Economics from the University of Illinois at Urbana-Champaign. After completing her PhD, titled A Study of Female Labor Force Participation and Fertility: A Cross-Cultural Approach, she moved to the University of Auckland, rising to full professor.

Maani has held visiting scholar positions at Harvard University and the National Bureau of Economic Research (NBER, U.S.), and visiting professorships at Oxford University, the University of Queensland, University of Wisconsin, and Universities of Sydney and Melbourne. She has served as the president of the New Zealand Association of Economists, and as a member of the Royal Society of New Zealand Social Science Advisory Committee.

She has made significant contributions to research and economic policy. Her work on economics of education was influential on government policies on student loans and allowances (student aid), as part of reforms of university tuition fee policy in New Zealand in 1992. Her contributions to applied economics include the life-time economic returns to education, evaluations of the New Zealand school voucher system, the impact of economic resources during childhood and adolescence on later academic achievement and earnings, and labour market outcomes for immigrants and minorities. Econometric modelling and use of longitudinal data feature prominently in her research.

Selected affiliations in Maani's academic career include:

- Executive Board of the Asian and Australasian Society of Labour Economics (AASLE), an inter-continental academic society, 2019–2022
- Research Fellow of the Institute of Labor Economics (IZA), an independent economic research institute and academic network focused on global labour market research, Bonn, Germany), 2014–present
- Executive Board member of the Australian Society of Labour Economists
- Founding Research Affiliate, Motu Economic and Public Policy Research, New Zealand

== Selected works ==
- Maani, S. A. (2021) “Covid-19: Government responses to labour market disruptions and economic impacts.” Chapter 3 in Management Perspectives on the Covid-19 Crisis: Lessons from New Zealand. Editors: Husted, K. and Sinkovics, R. R. Edward Elgar, U.K. access
- Maani, S. A. and Wen, L. (2021) “Over-education and immigrant earnings: A penalized quantile panel regression analysis.” Applied Economics. Volume 53 (24): 2771-2790. access
- Wang, X., Maani, S. A. and Rogers, A. (2021) “Economic network effects and immigrant earnings.” The Economic Record. Volume 97 (316): 78-99. access
- Wang, X. and Maani, S. A. (2021) “Ethnic regional networks and immigrants’ earnings: A spatial autoregressive network approach.” Papers in Regional Science. Volume 100 (1): 141-168. access
- Wen, L. and Maani, S. A. (2019) “Job mismatches and career mobility.” Applied Economics. Volume 51 (10): 1010-1024. access
- Maani, S. A. (2018) “Policy experimentation and impact evaluation: The case of a student voucher system in New Zealand.” Chapter 7 in Hybrid Public Policy Innovations: Contemporary Policy Beyond Ideology. Editors: Fabian, M. and Breunig, R. Routledge (Taylor and Francis), New York. access
- Maani, S. A. (2016) “Ethnic networks and location choice of immigrants”. IZA World of Labor. 1-10. IZA: Institute for Labor Economics, Bonn, Germany. access
- Zuccollo, J., Maani, S., Kaye-Blake, B. and Zeng, L. (2013) Private Returns to Tertiary Education: How Does New Zealand Compare to the OECD?. NZ Treasury Working Papers. no.13/10. access
- Maani, S. and Cruickshank, A. (2010) “What is the effect of housework on the market wage, and can it explain the gender wage gap?”. Journal of Economic Surveys. Volume 24 (3): 402-427. access
- Maani, S. A. and Kalb, G. (2007) "Academic performance, childhood economic resources, and the choice to leave school at age 16." Economics of Education Review. Volume 26 (3): 361-374. access
- Maani, S. A. (2006) “Parental income and the choice of participation in university, polytechnic, or employment at age 18: A longitudinal study.” Research on Economic Inequality. Volume 13: 217-247. access
- Maani, S. A. (2004) “Why have Maori relative income levels deteriorated over time?”. The Economic Record. Volume 80 (248): 101-124. access
- Maani, S. (1999) Private and Public Returns to Investments in Secondary and Higher Education in New Zealand Over Time: 1981-1996. New Zealand Treasury Working Papers. no. 99/02. access
- Maani, S. A. (1997) Investing in Minds: The Economics of Higher Education in New Zealand. Institute of Policy Studies, Wellington: ISBN 0-908935-11-0. 209 pp.
- Maani, S. A. (1996) “The effect of fees on participation in higher education: A survey of OECD countries”. New Zealand Economic Papers. Volume 30 (1): 55-86. access
- Kask, S. B. and Maani, S. A. (1992) “Uncertainty, information, and hedonic pricing." Land Economics. Volume 68 (2): 170-184. access
