= Zeydan, Bushehr =

Zeydan زيدون
- Village
- Location within Iran
- Coordinates: 27°58′18″N 51°30′58″E
- Country: Iran
- Province: Bushehr
- County: Deyr
- Bakhsh: Bord Khun
- Rural District: Bord Khun

Population (2006)
  - Total: 18
- Time zone: UTC+3:30 (IRST)
  - Summer (DST): UTC+4:30 (IRDT)

Zeydan (Persian: زيدون, also Romanized as Zeydān and Zeydūn) is a village in Bord Khun Rural District, Bord Khun District, Deyr County, Bushehr Province, Iran. At the 2006 census, its population was 18, in 4 families.
