= RL-83 Blindicide =

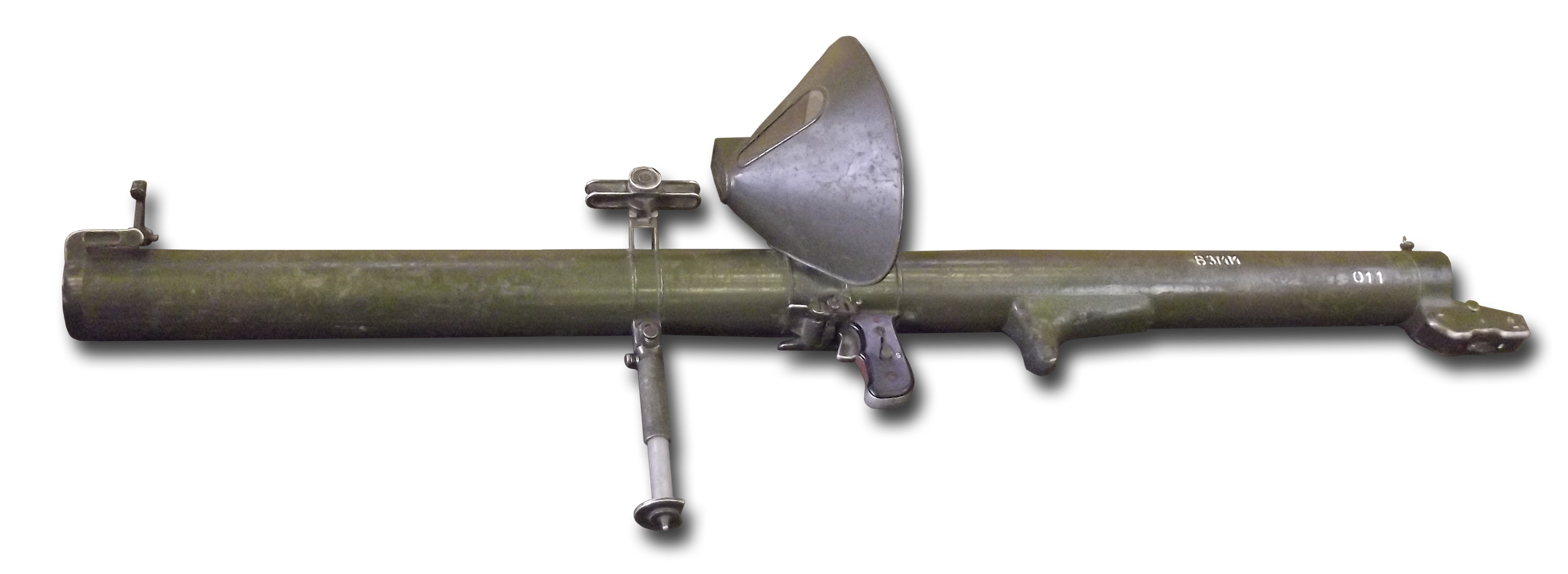
- RL-83 Blindicide
- Type: Anti-tank rocket launcher
- Place of origin: Belgium

Service history
- Used by: See Users
- Wars: Congo Crisis; Aden Emergency; Konfrontasi; Six-Day War; Indo-Pakistani War of 1971; Yom Kippur War; Lebanese Civil War; Mexican drug war Syrian Civil War

Production history
- Designed: 1950s
- Manufacturer: Mecar SA

Specifications
- Mass: 8.4 kg (RL-83); 12.9 kg (RL-100)
- Length: 1.7 m (RL-83); 1.885 m (RL-100)
- Crew: 2
- Shell: High-explosive anti-tank (HEAT)
- Caliber: 83 mm, 100 mm
- Rate of fire: 6 rpm
- Muzzle velocity: 100 m/s (RL-83); 195 m/s (RL-100)
- Effective firing range: 400 m (0.25 mi)
- Maximum firing range: 900 m (0.56 mi)

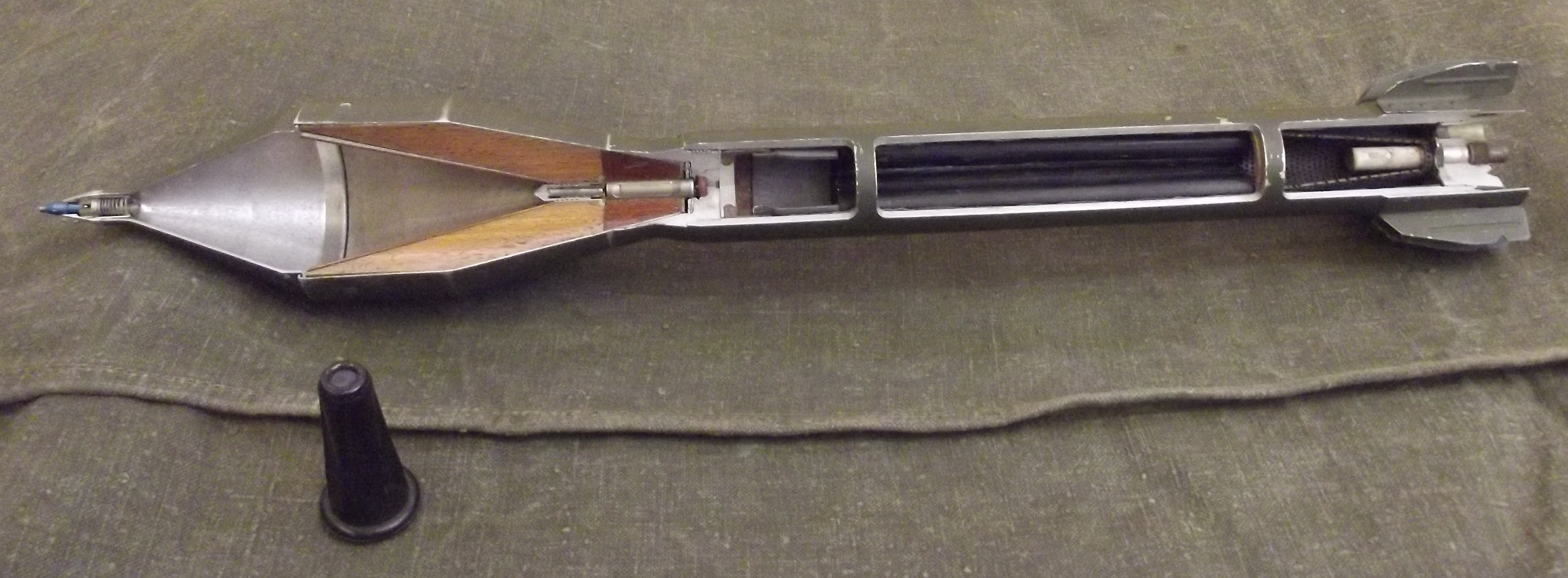
83 mm high-explosive anti-tank (HEAT) round sectioned to show (wooden replica) booster and main charges, copper cone and rocket motor

The RL-83 Blindicide is mainly an anti-tank warfare rocket launcher, but other types of rounds can be fired. It was produced by Mecar SA of Belgium and was an improved derivative of the M20A1 bazooka. Its name roughly means "tank killer", derived from the French "véhicule blindé" (armoured vehicle) and the suffix -cide.

== Versions ==
The 83 mm version fired a 1.6 kilograms (3.5 lb) projectile with a 0.5 kilograms (1.1 lb) warhead, while the 100 mm version fired a 2.75 kilograms (6.1 lb) projectile. The rate of fire was six rounds per minute and the range 400 metres (1,300 ft) for both versions. This rate of fire was considerably in excess of the M20A1 bazooka since Blindicide used a mechanical firing pin hitting a percussion cap in the tail of the rocket motor rather than a hand grip magneto system that required trailing wires from each rocket to be connected to terminal posts on the launcher as each round was loaded. The muzzle velocity of both versions varied, with the 83 mm version firing at 100 m/s while the 100 mm version fired at 195 m/s. A later round introduced for the RL-83 has a muzzle velocity of 120 m/s and uses a rocket booster to achieve a velocity of 300 m/s. The effective range of this 2.4 kg projectile is 500 meters.

The high-explosive anti-tank (HEAT) rocket of the RL-83 Blindicide can penetrate 300 millimeters of rolled homogeneous armour or one meter of concrete. Besides HEAT, the Blindicide can also fire anti-personnel, smoke, incendiary and illumination rounds.

The Blindicide was also produced in a 100 mm version (the RL-100). The RL-100 was trialled by Belgian Army but not put into service. The German BGS used the RL-100 as the Panzerabwehrgerät 101mm.

A final version of the Blindicide was the RLC-83, a shortened version of the RL-83. The RLC-83 differs from the RL-83 in having a 1.2 meter launch tube. The RLC-83 is intended to be used only with the rocket-boosted long-range projectiles.

Switzerland produced a licence version of the Blindicide, the Raketenrohr 58 (RR 58). The Raketenrohr 80 (RR 80) was an improved version with new aiming system for use by night. The Swiss army had a total of 20,000 RRs in service, all of which have been replaced by the German Panzerfaust 3. Apart from the defensive role the Swiss also used the Raketenrohr 80 to cause controlled avalanches, thus reducing the risks to civilians in avalanche prone areas.

A training round, practice rocket was available for Blindicide. This used a blank 20 mm cartridge to produce a flash and a bang, but the round fell only a few feet in front of the launcher.

A 20 mm Sub-caliber training round was also available. This had a rifled barrel and fired either a plastic or copper projectile. Initially this sub-caliber gun had a wooden body, but later an anodised Aluminium body was used.

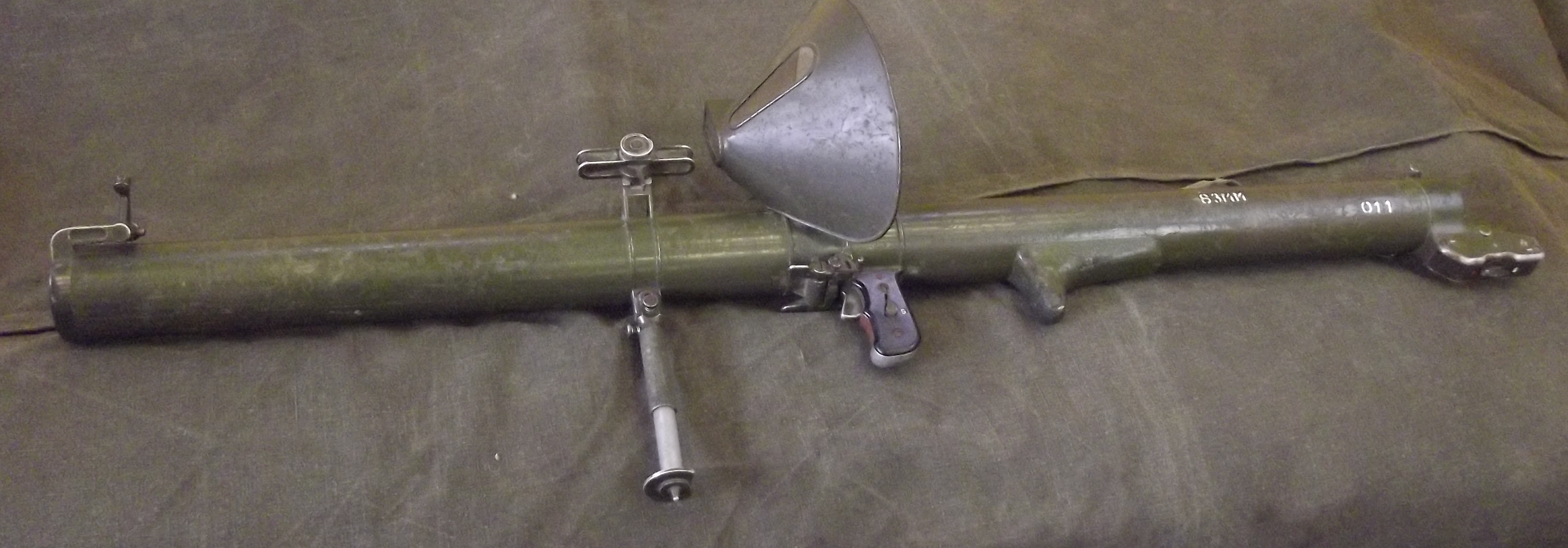
Mecar Blindicide RL-83 with Belgian pattern face shield and monopod extended

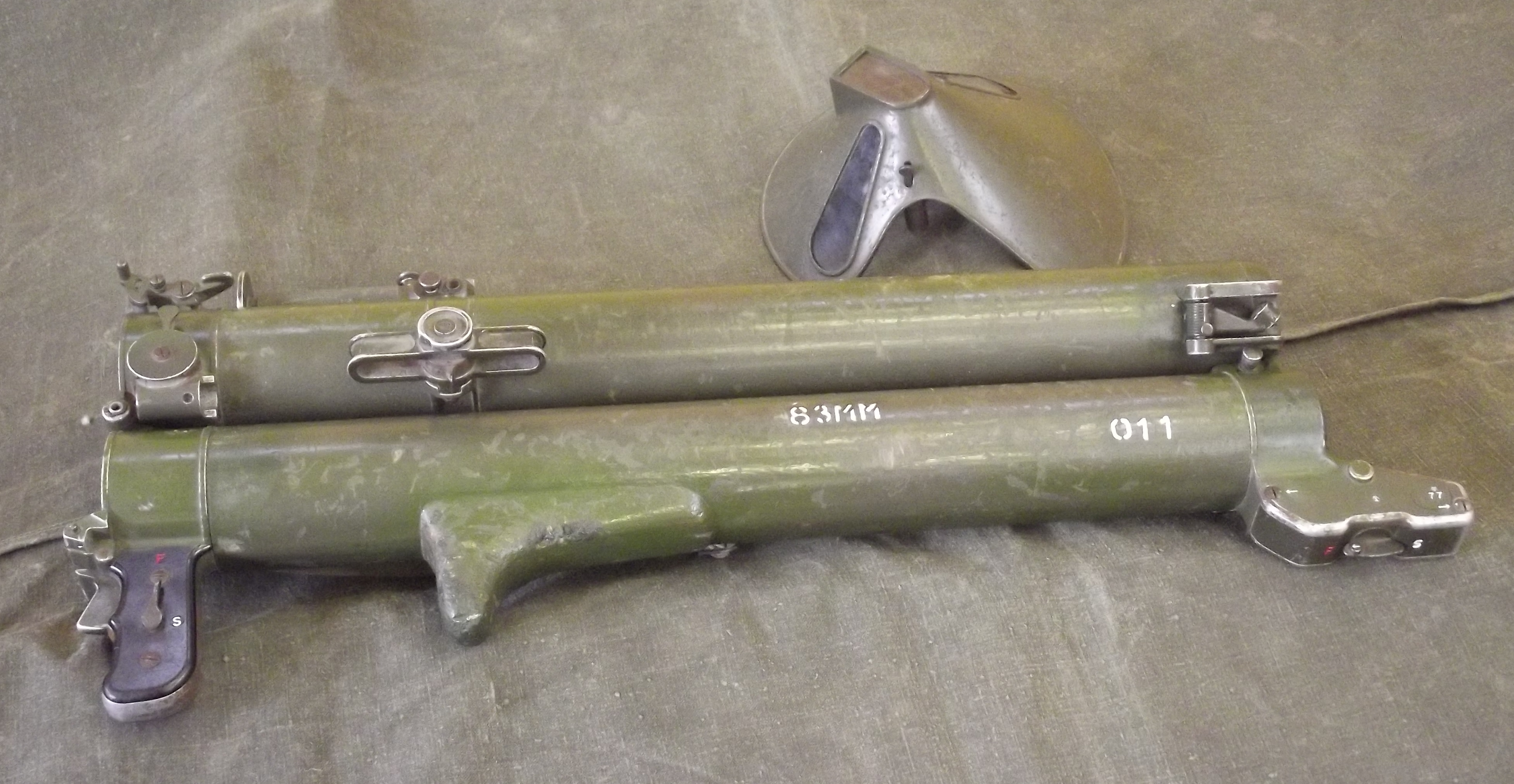
Folded Blindicide, Face shield detaches as separate item.

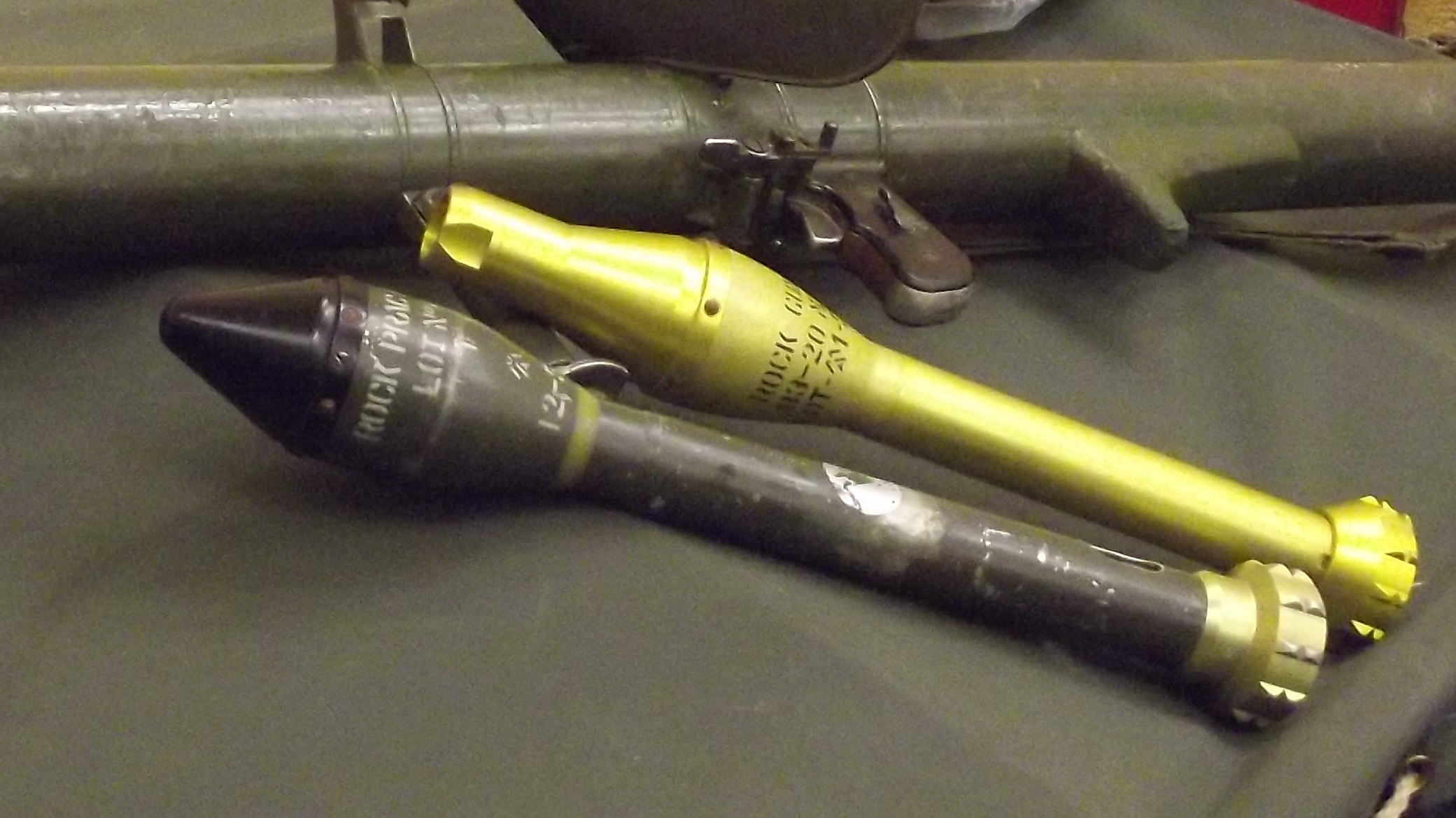
Rear 20 mm sub-caliber gun, The gun remained in the launcher when a single plastic or copper projectile was fired. Front training "rocket" was shot out the launcher by a 20 mm blank cartridge.

== Operational history ==
The Blindicide saw service with the Belgian forces during the Congo crisis.

The Blindicide was also used by Anti-British guerrillas during the Aden Emergency. A complete launcher and the remnants of several projectiles recovered from Aden are held by the Imperial War Museum. The Guards Museum in London holds a Blindicide Rocket fired at Irish Guards in Aden.

The RL-83 version was used by the Israel Defense Forces during the Six-Day War and the Yom Kippur War; it was also used by the Lebanese Army and by some Christian and Muslim militias during the Lebanese Civil War.

In recent years it has been reported that the Mexican Army deployed Blindicides against improvised armored vehicles in use by drug cartels.

The Blindicide has also been identified in video clips of the Free Syrian Army operating in Syria.

== Users ==
- Burundi – In use.
- Mexico – Acquired 1,191 launchers. In use as of 2011.

=== Former users ===
- Bangladesh – Retired
- Belgium – Retired in the late 1980s.
- Indonesia – Retired formerly used by Navy.
- Israel – Acquired 1000 units, saw action in wars with neighbouring Arab countries – Retired.
- Lebanon – Retired ("on the 4th of January 1973, the Belgian government issued an export license to MECAR for the export of 4 Blindicide 83 mm to the Lebanese army." Source Mecar SA)
- Netherlands – Retired former use by Netherlands Marine Corps.
- Nigeria – Retired
- Pakistan – Retired
- Rwanda – Received via France.
- Singapore – Retired
- Switzerland – Raketenrohr version Retired
- Syria – Retired
- West Germany – With BGS as larger calibre RL-100 (Panzerabwehrgerät 101mm), retired.

== Conflicts ==
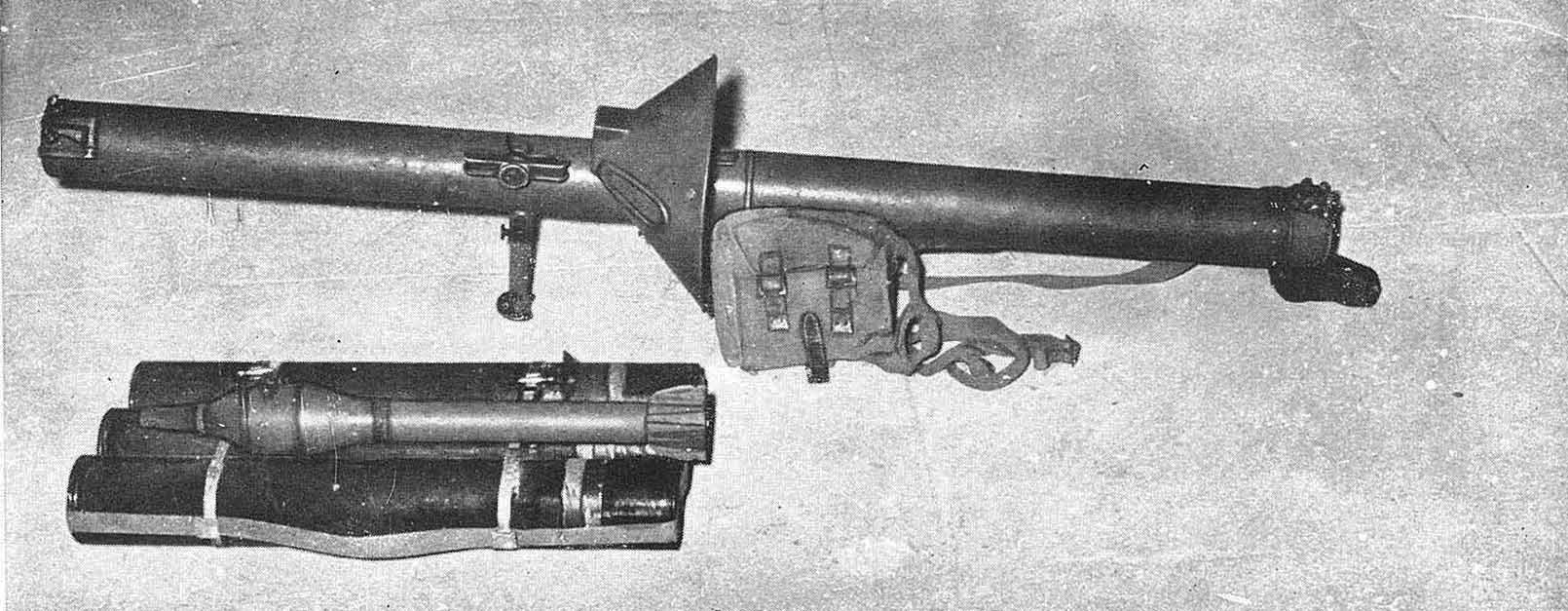
Indonesian Navy bazooka, Jalesveva Jayamahe, p123

- Aden Emergency
- Congo Crisis
- Lebanese Civil War
- Mexican drug war
- Six-Day War
- Syrian civil war
- Yom Kippur War
