= Kfour, Keserwan =

Kfour كفور
- Municipality
- Location in Lebanon
- Coordinates: 34°01′44″N 35°41′39″E
- Country: Lebanon
- Governorate: Keserwan-Jbeil
- District: Keserwan

Area
  - Total: 4.26 km^{2} (1.64 sq mi)
- Elevation: 830 m (2,720 ft)

Population
  - Total: 1,300
- Time zone: UTC+2 (EET)
  - Summer (DST): UTC+3 (EEST)

Kfour (Arabic: كفور, romanized: Kfūr) is a village and municipality in the Keserwan District of the Keserwan-Jbeil Governorate in Lebanon. Its average elevation is 830 metres (2723 ft) above sea level and its total land area is 426 hectares. Kfour's inhabitants are almost predominantly Maronite Catholic. As of 2008, the village had a public school with 290 students and a private school with 326 students; it also has a company with over 5 employees.
