= Sardasht Rural District (Behbahan County) =

Rural district in Khuzestan province, Iran

Sardasht Rural District Persian: دهستان سردشت
- Rural District
- Location within Iran
- Coordinates: 30°21′07″N 50°15′32″E
- Country: Iran
- Province: Khuzestan
- County: Behbahan
- District: Zeydun
- Capital: Sardasht

Population (2016)
  - Total: 3,488
- Time zone: UTC+3:30 (IRST)

Sardasht Rural District (Persian: دهستان سردشت) is in Zeydun District of Behbahan County, Khuzestan province, Iran. It is administered from the city of Sardasht.

== Demographics ==
=== Population ===
At the time of the 2006 National Census, the rural district's population was 4,487 in 933 households. There were 3,962 inhabitants in 989 households at the following census of 2011. The 2016 census measured the population of the rural district as 3,488 in 933 households. The most populous of its 33 villages was Qaleh Kabi, with 963 people.
