= Dorunak Rural District =

Rural district in Khuzestan province, Iran

Dorunak Rural District Persian: دهستان درونک
- Rural District
- Location within Iran
- Coordinates: 30°24′30″N 50°02′24″E
- Country: Iran
- Province: Khuzestan
- County: Behbahan
- District: Zeydun
- Capital: Dorunak

Population (2016)
  - Total: 4,311
- Time zone: UTC+3:30 (IRST)

Dorunak Rural District (Persian: دهستان درونک) is in Zeydun District of Behbahan County, Khuzestan province, Iran. Its capital is the village of Dorunak.

== Demographics ==
=== Population ===
At the time of the 2006 National Census, the rural district's population was 5,380 in 1,213 households. There were 4,875 inhabitants in 1,211 households at the following census of 2011. The 2016 census measured the population of the rural district as 4,311 in 1,199 households. The most populous of its 28 villages was Dorunak, with 684 people.
