= Zeydun District =

District in Khuzestan province, Iran

Zeydun District Persian: بخش زیدون
- District
- Location within Iran
- Coordinates: 30°21′07″N 50°11′49″E
- Country: Iran
- Province: Khuzestan
- County: Behbahan
- Capital: Sardasht

Population (2016)
  - Total: 14,711
- Time zone: UTC+3:30 (IRST)

Zeydun District (Persian: بخش زیدون) is in Behbahan County, Khuzestan province, Iran. Its capital is the city of Sardasht.

== Demographics ==
=== Population ===
At the time of the 2006 National Census, the district's population was 14,839 in 3,220 households. The following census in 2011 counted 15,076 people in 3,854 households. The 2016 census measured the population of the district as 14,711 inhabitants in 4,136 households.

=== Administrative divisions ===
Zeydun District Population
Administrative Divisions	2006	2011	2016
Dorunak RD	5,380	4,875	4,311
Sardasht RD	4,487	3,962	3,488
Sardasht (city)	4,972	6,239	6,912
Total	14,839	15,076	14,711
RD = Rural District
