= Nukabad (disambiguation) =

Nukabad is a city in Sistan and Baluchestan Province, Iran.

Nukabad (Persian: نوک آباد or نوك اباد) may also refer to:

== Sistan and Baluchestan Province ==
=== Chabahar County ===
- Nukabad, Chabahar, Sistan and Baluchestan Province
- Nukabad, Dashtiari, Chabahar County, Sistan and Baluchestan Province
- Nukabad (25°40′ N 61°25′ E), Dashtiari, Chabahar County, Sistan and Baluchestan Province
- Nukabad-e Janglian, Chabahar County, Sistan and Baluchestan Province
- Nukabad, Pir Sohrab, Chabahar County, Sistan and Baluchestan Province
- Nukabad, Polan, Chabahar County, Sistan and Baluchestan Province

=== Dalgan County ===
- Nukabad, Dalgan, a village in Dalgan County
- Nukabad-e Gonbad, a village in Dalgan County

=== Iranshahr County ===
- Nukabad, Iranshahr, a village in Iranshahr County
- Nukabad-e Sarhang, a village in Iranshahr County

=== Khash County ===
- Nukabad District, in Sistan and Baluchestan Province
