= Kahnak =

Kahnak or Kohnak or Kohonak or Kohnek or Kehnak or Kahnok or Kahanok (Persian: كهنك) may refer to:

- Kohnak, Hormozgan
- Kohnak, Bashagard, Hormozgan Province
- Kahnak, Bardsir, Kerman Province
- Kahnak, Manujan, Kerman Province
- Kahnok, Qaleh Ganj, Kerman Province
- Kohnak, Khuzestan
- Kahnak, Chabahar, Sistan and Baluchestan Province
- Kahanok (27°26′ N 59°36′ E), Dalgan, Sistan and Baluchestan Province
- Kahanok (27°26′ N 59°37′ E), Dalgan, Sistan and Baluchestan Province
- Kahnok, Hudiyan, Dalgan County, Sistan and Baluchestan Province
- Kahnok Ladi, Dalgan County, Sistan and Baluchestan Province
- Kahnak, Nukabad, Khash County, Sistan and Baluchestan Province
- Kahnak, Tehran

== See also ==
- Kahnag (disambiguation)
