= Khuda Bakhsh (disambiguation) =

- Language: Indo-Iranian

Origin
- Meaning: Gift of God

Other names
- Alternative spelling: Khodabakhsh

Khuda Bakhsh (variant spellings), meaning "God-Gifted", is a male Muslim given name popular in Bangladesh, Iran and Pakistan.

== People ==
- Khuda Bakhsh (1842–1908), former Chief Justice of the Supreme Court of Hyderabad
- Qazi Khuda Bakhsh (1894–1944), first Muslim mayor of Karachi
- Khuda Buksh (1912–1974), Bengali life insurance salesman and humanitarian
- Khuda Bakhsh Marri (1926–2006), former Governor of Balochistan
- Khoda Box Mridha (1945–2010), Bangladeshi cricketer and commentator
- Khoda Baksh Chowdhury (born 1952), 23rd Inspector General of Bangladesh Police
- Majid Khodabakhsh (born 1956), Iranian politician
- Malik Khuda Bakhsh Bucha (died 2002), former agriculture minister of Pakistan
- Khuda Bakhsh, Pakistani footballer
- Khuda Bakhsh Sheikh, Urdu poet
- Khuda Bux Rajar, Pakistani politician

== Places ==
=== India ===
- Khuda Bakhsh Oriental Library

=== Iran ===
- Khodabakhsh, Fars
- Khodabakhsh, South Khorasan
- Khodabakhsh Jadegal
- Khoda Bakhsh Jadegal Tukani
- Khodabakhsh-e Zaval
- Bazar-e Khodabakhsh
- Chah-e Khoda Bakhsh
- Chal Shahin-e Khoda Bakhsh
- Kalateh-ye Khoda Bakhsh

=== Pakistan ===
- Garhi Khuda Bakhsh

== See also ==
- Ataullah
