= Sardasht =

Sardasht or Sar-i-Dasht or Sar Dasht (Persian: سردشت) may refer to:

- Sardasht, Lordegan, a city in Chaharmahal and Bakhtiari province, Iran
- Sar Dasht, Fars, a village in Fars province, Iran
- Sardasht, Hormozgan, a city in Hormozgan province, Iran
- Saland, Iran, a city in Khuzestan province, Iran
- Sardasht, Khuzestan, a city in Khuzestan province, Iran
- Sardasht District, an administrative subdivision of Khuzestan province, Iran
- Sar Dasht, Bagh-e Malek, a village in Khuzestan province, Iran
- Sar Dasht, Kohgiluyeh, a village in Kohgiluyeh and Boyer-Ahmad province, Iran
- Sar Dasht-e Abdolreza, a village in Kohgiluyeh and Boyer-Ahmad province, Iran
- Sar Dasht-e Kalus, alternate name of Kalus-e Olya, a village in Kohgiluyeh and Boyer-Ahmad province, Iran
- Sardasht-e Kalus, a village in Kohgiluyeh and Boyer-Ahmad Province, Iran
- Sardasht, Kurdistan, a village in Kurdistan province, Iran
- Sar Dasht, Lorestan, a village in Lorestan province, Iran
- Sar Dasht, Razavi Khorasan, a village in Razavi Khorasan province, Iran
- Sardasht, Sistan and Baluchestan, a village in Sistan and Baluchestan province, Iran
- Sardasht-e Nematabad, a village in Sistan and Baluchestan province, Iran
- Sardasht, West Azerbaijan, a city in West Azerbaijan province, Iran
- Sardasht County, an administrative subdivision of West Azerbaijan province, Iran
- Sardasht Rural District (disambiguation), administrative subdivisions of Iran
