= Ladi =

Ladi may refer to

- Ladi (given name)
- Barkin Ladi, a local government area in Nigeria
- Aliabad-e Ladi, a village in Iran
- Hoseynabad Ladi, a village in Iran
- Kahnok Ladi, a village in Iran
- Tohman-e Ladi, a village in Iran
- Y Ladi Wen ("the White Lady"), a Celtic mythology apparition
- Ladi6 (born Karoline Tamati in 1982), a recording artist from New Zealand
