= Azarabad =

Village in Sistan and Baluchestan province, Iran

Azarabad Persian: اذراباد
- Village
- Location within Iran
- Coordinates: 27°05′01″N 59°25′20″E
- Country: Iran
- Province: Sistan and Baluchestan
- County: Dalgan
- District: Jolgeh-ye Chah Hashem
- Rural District: Azarabad

Population (2016)
  - Total: 433
- Time zone: UTC+3:30 (IRST)

Azarabad (Persian: اذراباد) (Note: Also romanized as Āz̄arābād, Āzerābād, and Azrābād) is a village in, and the capital of, Azarabad Rural District of Jolgeh-ye Chah Hashem District, Dalgan County, Sistan and Baluchestan province, Iran.

== Demographics ==
=== Population ===
At the 2006 National Census, the village's population was 543 in 103 households, when it was in Jolgeh-ye Chah Hashem Rural District of the former Dalgan District of Iranshahr County. The following census in 2011 counted 343 people in 75 households in the village, by which time the district had been separated from the county in the establishment of Dalgan County. The rural district was transferred to the new Jolgeh-ye Chah Hashem District. The 2016 census measured the population of the village as 433 people in 112 households.

After the census, Azarabad was transferred to Azarabad Rural District created in the district.
