= Chah-e Kichi =

Village in Sistan and Baluchestan province, Iran

Chah-e Kichi Persian: چاه کیچی
- Village
- Location within Iran
- Coordinates: 27°40′03″N 58°57′27″E
- Country: Iran
- Province: Sistan and Baluchestan
- County: Dalgan
- District: Central
- Rural District: Gonbad-e Alavi

Population (2016)
  - Total: 2,582
- Time zone: UTC+3:30 (IRST)

Chah-e Kichi (Persian: چاه کیچی) is a village in Gonbad-e Alavi Rural District of the Central District of Dalgan County, Sistan and Baluchestan province, Iran.

== Demographics ==
=== Population ===
At the time of the 2006 National Census, the village's population was 2,252 in 403 households, when it was in Dalgan Rural District of the former Dalgan District of Iranshahr County. The following census in 2011 counted 2,814 people in 578 households, by which time the district had been separated from the county in the establishment of Dalgan County. The rural district was transferred to the new Central District, and Chah-e Kichi was transferred to Gonbad-e Alavi Rural district created in the district. The 2016 census measured the population of the village as 2,582 people in 606 households. It was the most populous village in its rural district.
