= Gonbad-e Alavi =

Village in Sistan and Baluchestan province, Iran

Gonbad-e Alavi Persian: گنبد علوي
- Village
- Location within Iran
- Coordinates: 27°41′21″N 59°08′41″E
- Country: Iran
- Province: Sistan and Baluchestan
- County: Dalgan
- District: Central
- Rural District: Gonbad-e Alavi

Population (2016)
  - Total: 591
- Time zone: UTC+3:30 (IRST)

Gonbad-e Alavi (Persian: گنبد علوي) (Note: Also romanized as Gonbad-e ‘Alavī; also known as Gombaz, Gonbad, Gumbaz, and Gunbad) is a village in, and the capital of, Gonbad-e Alavi Rural District of the Central District of Dalgan County, Sistan and Baluchestan province, Iran.

== Demographics ==
=== Population ===
At the time of the 2006 National Census, the village's population was 512 in 80 households, when it was in Dalgan Rural District of the former Dalgan District of Iranshahr County. The following census in 2011 counted 627 people in 134 households, by which time the district had been separated from the county in the establishment of Dalgan County. The rural district was transferred to the new Central District, and Gonbad-e Alavi was transferred to Gonbad-e Alavi Rural District created in the district. The 2016 census measured the population of the village as 591 people in 143 households.
