= Mand-e Bala =

Village in Sistan and Baluchestan province, Iran

Mand-e Bala Persian: مند بالا
- Village
- Location within Iran
- Coordinates: 27°06′23″N 59°33′33″E
- Country: Iran
- Province: Sistan and Baluchestan
- County: Dalgan
- District: Jolgeh-ye Chah Hashem
- Rural District: Chah-e Ali

Population (2016)
  - Total: 1,119
- Time zone: UTC+3:30 (IRST)

Mand-e Bala (Persian: مند بالا) (Note: Also romanized as Mand-e Bālā; also known as Mand) is a village in Chah-e Ali Rural District of Jolgeh-ye Chah Hashem District, Dalgan County, Sistan and Baluchestan province, Iran.

== Demographics ==
=== Population ===
At the time of the 2006 National Census, the village's population was 935 in 187 households, when it was in Jolgeh-ye Chah Hashem Rural District of the former Dalgan District of Iranshahr County. The following census in 2011 counted 1,033 people in 227 households, by which time the district had been separated from the county in the establishment of Dalgan County. The rural district was transferred to the new Jolgeh-ye Chah Hashem District, and Mand-e Bala was transferred to Chah-e Ali Rural District created in the district. The 2016 census measured the population of the village as 1,119 people in 288 households. It was the most populous village in its rural district.
