= Chah-e Ali, Dalgan =

Village in Sistan and Baluchestan province, Iran

Chah-e Ali Persian: چاه علي
- Village
- Location within Iran
- Coordinates: 27°06′09″N 59°43′02″E
- Country: Iran
- Province: Sistan and Baluchestan
- County: Dalgan
- District: Jolgeh-ye Chah Hashem
- Rural District: Chah-e Ali

Population (2016)
  - Total: 717
- Time zone: UTC+3:30 (IRST)

Chah-e Ali (Persian: چاه علي is a village in, and the capital of, Chah-e Ali Rural District of Jolgeh-ye Chah Hashem District, Dalgan County, Sistan and Baluchestan province, Iran.

== Demographics ==
=== Population ===
At the time of the 2006 National Census, the village's population was 674 in 123 households, when it was in Jolgeh-ye Chah Hashem Rural District of the former Dalgan District of Iranshahr County. The following census in 2011 counted 613 people in 135 households, by which time the district had been separated from the county in the establishment of Dalgan County. The rural district was transferred to the new Jolgeh-ye Chah Hashem District, and Chah-e Ali was transferred to Chah-e Ali Rural District created in the district. The 2016 census measured the population of the village as 717 people in 180 households.
