= Derap =

Derap دراپ
- Village
- Country: Iran
- Province: Sistan and Baluchestan
- County: Dalgan
- Bakhsh: Jolgeh-ye Chah Hashem
- Rural District: Jolgeh-ye Chah Hashem

Population (2006)
  - Total: 100 and something
- Time zone: UTC+3:30 (UTC +3)
  - Summer (DST): UTC+8 (IRDT)

Derap (Persian: دراپ, also Romanized as Derāp) is a village in Jolgeh-ye Chah Hashem Rural District, Jolgeh-ye Chah Hashem District, Dalgan County, Sistan and Baluchestan Province, Iran. At the 2006 census, its population was 130, in 28 families.
