= Gaz Shahan =

Gaz Shahan گزشاهان
- Village
- Location within Iran
- Coordinates: 27°34′05″N 59°13′21″E
- Country: Iran
- Province: Sistan and Baluchestan
- County: Dalgan
- Bakhsh: Central
- Rural District: Dalgan

Population (2006)
  - Total: 437
- Time zone: UTC+3:30 (IRST)
  - Summer (DST): UTC+4:30 (IRDT)

Gaz Shahan (Persian: گزشاهان, also Romanized as Gaz Shāhān and Goz Shāhān) is a village in Dalgan Rural District, in the Central District of Dalgan County, Sistan and Baluchestan Province, Iran. At the 2006 census, its population was 437, in 84 families.
