= Kalakontak =

Kalakontak كلاكنتك
- Village
- Location within Iran
- Coordinates: 27°25′08″N 59°35′39″E
- Country: Iran
- Province: Sistan and Baluchestan
- County: Dalgan
- Bakhsh: Central
- Rural District: Dalgan

Population (2006)
  - Total: 337
- Time zone: UTC+3:30 (IRST)
  - Summer (DST): UTC+4:30 (IRDT)

Kalakontak (Persian: كلاكنتك, also Romanized as Kalākontak; also known as Kalān Kantak and Kalān Kontak) is a village in Dalgan Rural District, in the Central District of Dalgan County, Sistan and Baluchestan Province, Iran. At the 2006 census, its population was 337, in 67 families.
