= Seh Payeh-e Ziarat-e Gonbad =

Seh Payeh-e Ziarat-e Gonbad سه پايه زيارت گنبد
- Village
- Location within Iran
- Coordinates: 27°39′07″N 59°09′35″E
- Country: Iran
- Province: Sistan and Baluchestan
- County: Dalgan
- Bakhsh: Central
- Rural District: Dalgan

Population (2006)
  - Total: 542
- Time zone: UTC+3:30 (IRST)
  - Summer (DST): UTC+4:30 (IRDT)

Seh Payeh-e Ziarat-e Gonbad (Persian: سه پايه زيارت گنبد, also Romanized as Seh Pāyeh-e Zīārat-e Gonbad; also known as Seh Pāyeh-e Zīārat) is a village in Dalgan Rural District, in the Central District of Dalgan County, Sistan and Baluchestan Province, Iran. At the 2006 census, its population was 542, in 97 families.
