= Huraki =

Huraki هوركي
- Village
- Location within Iran
- Coordinates: 27°55′08″N 59°27′21″E
- Country: Iran
- Province: Sistan and Baluchestan
- County: Dalgan
- Bakhsh: Central
- Rural District: Hudian

Population (2006)
  - Total: 180
- Time zone: UTC+3:30 (IRST)
  - Summer (DST): UTC+4:30 (IRDT)

Huraki (Persian: هوركي, also Romanized as Hūrakī) is a village in Hudian Rural District, in the Central District of Dalgan County, Sistan and Baluchestan Province, Iran. At the 2006 census, its population was 180, in 37 families.
