= Gaz Gar =

Gaz Gar گزگر
- Village
- Location within Iran
- Coordinates: 27°26′00″N 59°29′00″E
- Country: Iran
- Province: Sistan and Baluchestan
- County: Dalgan
- Bakhsh: Central
- Rural District: Dalgan

Population (2006)
  - Total: 1,049
- Time zone: UTC+3:30 (IRST)
  - Summer (DST): UTC+4:30 (IRDT)

Gaz Gar (Persian: گزگر) is a village in Dalgan Rural District, in the Central District of Dalgan County, Sistan and Baluchestan Province, Iran. At the 2006 census, its population was 1,049, in 204 families.
