= Kaljegan =

Kaljegan كل جگان
- Village
- Location within Iran
- Coordinates: 27°46′44″N 59°22′06″E
- Country: Iran
- Province: Sistan and Baluchestan
- County: Dalgan
- Bakhsh: Central
- Rural District: Hudian

Population (2006)
  - Total: 25
- Time zone: UTC+3:30 (IRST)
  - Summer (DST): UTC+4:30 (IRDT)

Kaljegan (Persian: كل جگان, also Romanized as Kaljegān) is a village in Hudian Rural District, in the Central District of Dalgan County, Sistan and Baluchestan Province, Iran. At the 2006 census, its population was 25, in 4 families.
