= Poshteh-ye Pirdad =

Poshteh-ye Pirdad پشته پيرداد
- Village
- Country: Iran
- Province: Sistan and Baluchestan
- County: Dalgan
- Bakhsh: Central
- Rural District: Hudian

Population (2006)
  - Total: 130
- Time zone: UTC+3:30 (IRST)
  - Summer (DST): UTC+4:30 (IRDT)

Poshteh-ye Pirdad (Persian: پشته پيرداد, also Romanized as Poshteh-ye Pīrdād) is a village in Hudian Rural District, in the Central District of Dalgan County, Sistan and Baluchestan Province, Iran. At the 2006 census, its population was 130, in 25 families.
