= Hitak, Dalgan =

Hitak هيتك
- Village
- Location within Iran
- Coordinates: 27°26′08″N 59°35′37″E
- Country: Iran
- Province: Sistan and Baluchestan
- County: Dalgan
- Bakhsh: Central
- Rural District: Dalgan

Population (2006)
  - Total: 496
- Time zone: UTC+3:30 (IRST)
  - Summer (DST): UTC+4:30 (IRDT)

Hitak (Persian: هيتك, also Romanized as Hītak; also known as Hītak-e Kolā Kantak) is a village in Dalgan Rural District, in the Central District of Dalgan County, Sistan and Baluchestan Province, Iran. At the 2006 census, its population was 496, in 102 families.
