= Gunefshgan =

Gunefshgan گونفشگان
- Village
- Location within Iran
- Coordinates: 27°51′44″N 59°36′41″E
- Country: Iran
- Province: Sistan and Baluchestan
- County: Dalgan
- Bakhsh: Central
- Rural District: Hudian

Population (2006)
  - Total: 48
- Time zone: UTC+3:30 (IRST)
  - Summer (DST): UTC+4:30 (IRDT)

Gunefshgan (Persian: گونفشگان, also Romanized as Gūnefshgān) is a village in Hudian Rural District, in the Central District of Dalgan County, Sistan and Baluchestan Province, Iran. At the 2006 census, its population was 48, in 9 families.
