= Deh-e Dasht, Sistan and Baluchestan =

Deh-e Dasht دهدشت
- Village
- Location within Iran
- Coordinates: 27°54′46″N 59°26′54″E
- Country: Iran
- Province: Sistan and Baluchestan
- County: Dalgan
- Bakhsh: Central
- Rural District: Hudian

Population (2006)
  - Total: 118
- Time zone: UTC+3:30 (IRST)
  - Summer (DST): UTC+4:30 (IRDT)

Deh-e Dasht (Persian: دهدشت) is a village in Hudian Rural District, in the Central District of Dalgan County, Sistan and Baluchestan Province, Iran. At the 2006 census, its population was 118, in 29 families.
