= Bagh-e Nil =

Bagh-e Nil باغ نيل
- Village
- Location within Iran
- Coordinates: 27°07′43″N 59°27′11″E
- Country: Iran
- Province: Sistan and Baluchestan
- County: Dalgan
- Bakhsh: Jolgeh-ye Chah Hashem
- Rural District: Jolgeh-ye Chah Hashem

Population (2006)
  - Total: 305
- Time zone: UTC+3:30 (IRST)
  - Summer (DST): UTC+4:30 (IRDT)

Bagh-e Nil (Persian: باغ نيل, also Romanized as Bāgh-e Nīl; also known as Baganīl) is a village in Jolgeh-ye Chah Hashem Rural District, Jolgeh-ye Chah Hashem District, Dalgan County, Sistan and Baluchestan Province, Iran. At the 2006 census, its population was 305, in 54 families.
