= Pasgah Hudian =

Pasgah Hudian پاسگاه هوديان
- Village
- Country: Iran
- Province: Sistan and Baluchestan
- County: Dalgan
- Bakhsh: Central
- Rural District: Hudian

Population (2006)
  - Total: 322
- Time zone: UTC+3:30 (IRST)
  - Summer (DST): UTC+4:30 (IRDT)

Pasgah Hudian (Persian: پاسگاه هوديان, also Romanized as Pāsgāh Hūdīān) is a village in Hudian Rural District, in the Central District of Dalgan County, Sistan and Baluchestan Province, Iran. At the 2006 census, its population was 322, in 71 families.
