= Deh-e Parkak =

Deh-e Parkak ده پركك
- Village
- Location within Iran
- Coordinates: 27°53′58″N 59°19′10″E
- Country: Iran
- Province: Sistan and Baluchestan
- County: Dalgan
- Bakhsh: Central
- Rural District: Hudian

Population (2006)
  - Total: 100
- Time zone: UTC+3:30 (IRST)
  - Summer (DST): UTC+4:30 (IRDT)

Deh-e Parkak (Persian: ده پركك; also known as Deh-e Parak) is a village in Hudian Rural District, in the Central District of Dalgan County, Sistan and Baluchestan Province, Iran. At the 2006 census, its population was 100, in 15 families.
