= Konar Shib =

Konar Shib كنار شيب
- Village
- Location within Iran
- Coordinates: 27°55′51″N 59°27′06″E
- Country: Iran
- Province: Sistan and Baluchestan
- County: Dalgan
- Bakhsh: Central
- Rural District: Hudian

Population (2006)
  - Total: 71
- Time zone: UTC+3:30 (IRST)
  - Summer (DST): UTC+4:30 (IRDT)

Konar Shib (Persian: كنار شيب, also Romanized as Konār Shīb; also known as Konār Shahr, Konār Shīr, and Sūreg) is a village in Hudian Rural District, in the Central District of Dalgan County, Sistan and Baluchestan Province, Iran. At the 2006 census, its population was 71, in 16 families.
