= Aliabad-e Goldasht =

Aliabad-e Goldasht علي آباد گلدشت
- Village
- Location within Iran
- Coordinates: 27°31′00″N 59°25′00″E
- Country: Iran
- Province: Sistan and Baluchestan
- County: Dalgan
- Bakhsh: Central
- Rural District: Dalgan

Population (2006)
  - Total: 120
- Time zone: UTC+3:30 (IRST)
  - Summer (DST): UTC+4:30 (IRDT)

Aliabad-e Goldasht (Persian: علي آباد گلدشت, romanized as ‘Alīābād-e Goldasht; also known as ‘Alīābād) is a village in Dalgan Rural District, in the Central District of Dalgan County, Sistan and Baluchestan Province, Iran. At the 2006 census, its population was 120, in 21 families.
