= Kambar-e Baqer =

Kambar-e Baqer كمبارباقر
- Village
- Location within Iran
- Coordinates: 27°04′00″N 59°11′44″E
- Country: Iran
- Province: Sistan and Baluchestan
- County: Dalgan
- Bakhsh: Jolgeh-ye Chah Hashem
- Rural District: Jolgeh-ye Chah Hashem

Population (2006)
  - Total: 95
- Time zone: UTC+3:30 (IRST)
  - Summer (DST): UTC+4:30 (IRDT)

Kambar-e Baqer (Persian: كمبارباقر, also Romanized as Kambār-e Bāqer; also known as Kūbār-e Bāqer) is a village in Jolgeh-ye Chah Hashem Rural District, Jolgeh-ye Chah Hashem District, Dalgan County, Sistan and Baluchestan Province, Iran. At the 2006 census, its population was 95, in 15 families.
