= Damui =

Damui دمويي
- Village
- Location within Iran
- Coordinates: 27°11′00″N 59°54′00″E
- Country: Iran
- Province: Sistan and Baluchestan
- County: Dalgan
- Bakhsh: Jolgeh-ye Chah Hashem
- Rural District: Jolgeh-ye Chah Hashem

Population (2006)
  - Total: 41
- Time zone: UTC+3:30 (IRST)
  - Summer (DST): UTC+4:30 (IRDT)

Damui (Persian: دمويي, also Romanized as Damū’ī) is a village in Jolgeh-ye Chah Hashem Rural District, Jolgeh-ye Chah Hashem District, Dalgan County, Sistan and Baluchestan Province, Iran. At the 2006 census, its population was 41, in 7 families.
