= Shahrak Ashayiri-ye Khosrin =

Shahrak Ashayiri-ye Khosrin شهرك عشايري خسرين
- Village
- Location within Iran
- Coordinates: 27°43′03″N 59°20′38″E
- Country: Iran
- Province: Sistan and Baluchestan
- County: Dalgan
- Bakhsh: Central
- Rural District: Dalgan

Population (2006)
  - Total: 663
- Time zone: UTC+3:30 (IRST)
  - Summer (DST): UTC+4:30 (IRDT)

Shahrak Ashayiri-ye Khosrin (Persian: شهرك عشايري خسرين, also Romanized as Shahrak-e ʿAshāyrī Khosrīn; also known as Khosrī and Khosrīn) is a village in Dalgan Rural District, in the Central District of Dalgan County, Sistan and Baluchestan Province, Iran. At the 2006 census, its population was 663, in 119 families.
