= Gerdu Nan =

Gerdu Nan گردونان
- Village
- Location within Iran
- Coordinates: 26°52′33″N 59°04′12″E
- Country: Iran
- Province: Sistan and Baluchestan
- County: Dalgan
- Bakhsh: Jolgeh-ye Chah Hashem
- Rural District: Jolgeh-ye Chah Hashem

Population (2006)
  - Total: 162
- Time zone: UTC+3:30 (IRST)
  - Summer (DST): UTC+4:30 (IRDT)

Gerdu Nan (Persian: گردونان, also Romanized as Gerdū Nān; also known as Gerd-e Nān) is a village in Jolgeh-ye Chah Hashem Rural District, Jolgeh-ye Chah Hashem District, Dalgan County, Sistan and Baluchestan Province, Iran. At the 2006 census, its population was 162, in 38 families.
