= Shahrak-e Taqiabad =

Shahrak-e Taqiabad شهرک تقی‌آباد
- village
- Country: Iran
- Province: Sistan and Baluchestan
- County: Dalgan
- Bakhsh: Jolgeh-ye Chah Hashem
- Rural District: Jolgeh-ye Chah Hashem

Population (2006)
  - Total: 555
- Time zone: UTC+3:30 (IRST)
  - Summer (DST): UTC+4:30 (IRDT)

Shahrak-e Taqiabad (Persian: شهرک تقی‌آباد, also Romanized as Shahrak-e Taqīābād; also known as Ragīāband) is a village in Jolgeh-ye Chah Hashem Rural District, Jolgeh-ye Chah Hashem District, Dalgan County, Sistan and Baluchestan Province, Iran. At the 2006 census, its population was 555, in 108 families.
