= Dukan Kopt =

Dukan Kopt دوكان كپت
- Village
- Location within Iran
- Coordinates: 27°51′06″N 59°34′32″E
- Country: Iran
- Province: Sistan and Baluchestan
- County: Dalgan
- Bakhsh: Central
- Rural District: Hudian

Population (2006)
  - Total: 174
- Time zone: UTC+3:30 (IRST)
  - Summer (DST): UTC+4:30 (IRDT)

Dukan Kopt (Persian: دوكان كپت, also Romanized as Dūkān Kopt) is a village in Hudian Rural District, in the Central District of Dalgan County, Sistan and Baluchestan Province, Iran. At the 2006 census, its population was 174, in 27 families.
