= Hudian, Sistan and Baluchestan =

Village in Sistan and Baluchestan province, Iran

Hudian Persian: هوديان
- Village
- Location within Iran
- Coordinates: 27°55′28″N 59°26′54″E
- Country: Iran
- Province: Sistan and Baluchestan
- County: Dalgan
- District: Central
- Rural District: Hudian

Population (2016)
  - Total: 383
- Time zone: UTC+3:30 (IRST)

Hudian (Persian: هوديان) (Note: Also romanized as Hūdīān and Hūdīyān) is a village in, and the capital of, Hudian Rural District of the Central District of Dalgan County, Sistan and Baluchestan province, Iran.

== Demographics ==
=== Population ===
At the time of the 2006 National Census, the village's population was 392 in 93 households, when it was in the former Dalgan District of Iranshahr County. The following census in 2011 counted 283 people in 77 households, by which time the district had been separated from the county in the establishment of Dalgan County. The rural district was transferred to the new Central District. The 2016 census measured the population of the village as 383 people in 114 households. It was the most populous village in its rural district.
