= Hudiyan =

Hudiyan or Hudian (Persian: هوديان) may refer to:

- Hudian, Sistan and Baluchestan
- Hudian Rural District, in Sistan and Baluchestan Province
