= Kahnag =

Kahnag (Persian: كهنگ) may refer to:

- Kahnag, Kerman
- Kahnag, Khuzestan

== See also ==
- Kahnak (disambiguation)
