= Aliabad-e Ladi =

Aliabad-e Ladi علي ابادلدي
- Village
- Location within Iran
- Coordinates: 27°30′46″N 59°26′01″E
- Country: Iran
- Province: Sistan and Baluchestan
- County: Dalgan
- Bakhsh: Central
- Rural District: Dalgan

Population (2006)
  - Total: 415
- Time zone: UTC+3:30 (IRST)
  - Summer (DST): UTC+4:30 (IRDT)

Aliabad-e Ladi (Persian: علي ابادلدي, also Romanized as ‘Alīābād-e Ladī) is a village in Dalgan Rural District, in the Central District of Dalgan County, Sistan and Baluchestan Province, Iran. At the 2006 census, its population was 415, in 83 families.
