= Sardasht-e Nematabad =

Sardasht-e Nematabad سر دشت نعمت آباد
- Village
- Location within Iran
- Coordinates: 27°32′54″N 59°18′19″E
- Country: Iran
- Province: Sistan and Baluchestan
- County: Dalgan
- Bakhsh: Central
- Rural District: Dalgan

Population (2006)
  - Total: 283
- Time zone: UTC+3:30 (IRST)
  - Summer (DST): UTC+4:30 (IRDT)

Sardasht-e Nematabad (Persian: سر دشت نعمت آباد, also Romanized as Sardasht-e Neʿmatābād) is a village in Dalgan Rural District, in the Central District of Dalgan County, Sistan and Baluchestan Province, Iran. At the 2006 census, its population was 283, in 49 families.
