= Jabrabad =

Jabrabad (Persian: جبراباد) may refer to:

- Jabrabad, Kermanshah
- Jabrabad, Khuzestan
- Jabrabad, Sistan and Baluchestan
