= Bakhsh (disambiguation) =

Bakhsh is a third-level administrative division of Iran.

Bakhsh (Arabic: بخش), a Persian word meaning fortune or luck may also refer to:

== People ==
- Allah Bakhsh, multiple people
- Khuda Bakhsh (disambiguation), multiple people
- Mirza Muhammad Kam Bakhsh (1667-1709), Mughal prince and ruler of Bijapur
- Mir Bakhsh Ali, Mughal faujdar of Bakla (Barisal, Bangladesh)
- Gul Bakhsh (fl. 1860), Bengali poet
- Mir Ghaus Bakhsh Bizenjo (1917-1989), third governor of Balochistan
- Khair Bakhsh Marri (1928-2014), Baloch politician
- Mian Bakhsh Laghari (1944-1999), Pakistani academic
