= Jolgeh-ye Chah Hashem =

Jolgeh-ye Chah Hashem (Persian: جلگه چاه هاشم) may refer to:

- Jolgeh-ye Chah Hashem District
- Jolgeh-ye Chah Hashem Rural District
