= Chah-e Khoda Bakhsh =

Village in Sistan and Baluchestan province, Iran

Chah-e Khoda Bakhsh Persian: چاه خدابخش
- Village
- Location within Iran
- Coordinates: 27°26′09″N 59°35′41″E
- Country: Iran
- Province: Sistan and Baluchestan
- County: Dalgan
- District: Central
- Rural District: Dalgan

Population (2016)
  - Total: 2,043
- Time zone: UTC+3:30 (IRST)

Chah-e Khoda Bakhsh (Persian: چاه خدابخش is a village in Dalgan Rural District of the Central District of Dalgan County, Sistan and Baluchestan province, Iran.

== Demographics ==
=== Population ===
At the time of the 2006 National Census, the village's population was 1,812 in 352 households, when it was in the former Dalgan District of Iranshahr County. The following census in 2011 counted 1,863 people in 386 households, by which time the district had been separated from the county in the establishment of Dalgan County. The rural district was transferred to the new Central District. The 2016 census measured the population of the village as 2,043 people in 482 households. It was the most populous village in its rural district.
