= Jabrabad, Sistan and Baluchestan =

Jabrabad جبراباد
- Village
- Location within Iran
- Coordinates: 27°26′17″N 59°40′56″E
- Country: Iran
- Province: Sistan and Baluchestan
- County: Dalgan
- Bakhsh: Central
- Rural District: Dalgan

Population (2006)
  - Total: 716
- Time zone: UTC+3:30 (IRST)
  - Summer (DST): UTC+4:30 (IRDT)

Jabrabad (Persian: جبراباد, also Romanized as Jabrābād) is a village in Dalgan Rural District, in the Central District of Dalgan County, Sistan and Baluchestan Province, Iran. At the 2006 census, its population was 716, in 116 families.
