= Chehel Konar =

Chehel Konar (Persian: چهل كنار) may refer to:

- Chehel Konar, Khuzestan
- Chehel Konar, Sistan and Baluchestan
