= Hidan, Iran =

Hidan هيدان
- village
- Location within Iran
- Coordinates: 27°54′31″N 59°27′11″E
- Country: Iran
- Province: Sistan and Baluchestan
- County: Dalgan
- Bakhsh: Central
- Rural District: Hudian

Population (2006)
  - Total: 457
- Time zone: UTC+3:30 (IRST)
  - Summer (DST): UTC+4:30 (IRDT)

Hidan (Persian: هيدان, also Romanized as Hīdān; also known as Hīvān) is a village in Hudian Rural District, in the Central District of Dalgan County, Sistan and Baluchestan Province, Iran. At the 2006 census, its population was 457, in 94 families.
