= Hassanpour =

Hassanpour is a surname. Notable people with the surname include:

- Adnan Hassanpour (born 1974 or 1975), Iranian journalist
- Amir Hassanpour (1943–2017), Iranian Kurdish scholar
- Dariush Hassanpour (born 1996), German politician
- Nasim Hassanpour (born 1984), Iranian sport shooter

== See also ==
- Hosseinpour
