= Damitun-e Bala =

Damitun-e Bala دميتون بالا
- Village
- Location within Iran
- Coordinates: 26°51′00″N 58°55′48″E
- Country: Iran
- Province: Sistan and Baluchestan
- County: Dalgan
- Bakhsh: Jolgeh-ye Chah Hashem
- Rural District: Jolgeh-ye Chah Hashem

Population (2006)
  - Total: 110
- Time zone: UTC+3:30 (IRST)
  - Summer (DST): UTC+4:30 (IRDT)

Damitun-e Bala (Persian: دميتون بالا, also romanized as Damītūn-e Bālā) is a village in Jolgeh-ye Chah Hashem Rural District, Jolgeh-ye Chah Hashem District, Dalgan County, Sistan and Baluchestan Province, Iran. At the 2006 census, its population was 110, in 25 families.
