= Nukabad-e Gonbad =

Nukabad-e Gonbad نوك ابادگنبد
- Village
- Location within Iran
- Coordinates: 27°41′31″N 59°07′42″E
- Country: Iran
- Province: Sistan and Baluchestan
- County: Dalgan
- Bakhsh: Central
- Rural District: Dalgan

Population (2006)
  - Total: 426
- Time zone: UTC+3:30 (IRST)
  - Summer (DST): UTC+4:30 (IRDT)

Nukabad-e Gonbad (Persian: نوك ابادگنبد, also Romanized as Nūkābād-e Gonbad; also known as Nūkābād) is a village in Dalgan Rural District, in the Central District of Dalgan County, Sistan and Baluchestan Province, Iran. At the 2006 census, its population was 426, in 83 families.
