= Ab Konar =

Ab Konar or Abkenar (Persian: اب كنار) may refer to:

- Abkenar, Gilan
- Ab Konar, Khuzestan
