= Chah-e Ali Rural District =

Rural district in Sistan and Baluchestan province, Iran

Chah-e Ali Rural District Persian: دهستان چاه علي
- Rural District
- Location within Iran
- Coordinates: 27°06′09″N 59°43′02″E
- Country: Iran
- Province: Sistan and Baluchestan
- County: Dalgan
- District: Jolgeh-ye Chah Hashem
- Capital: Chah-e Ali

Population (2016)
  - Total: 4,748
- Time zone: UTC+3:30 (IRST)

Chah-e Ali Rural District (Persian: دهستان چاه علي) is in Jolgeh-ye Chah Hashem District of Dalgan County, Sistan and Baluchestan province, Iran. Its capital is the village of Chah-e Ali.

== History ==
After the 2006 National Census, Dalgan District was separated from Iranshahr County in the establishment of Dalgan County, and Chah-e Ali Rural District was created in the new Jolgeh-ye Chah Hashem District.

== Demographics ==
=== Population ===
At the time of the 2011 census, the rural district's population was 4,620 in 994 households. The 2016 census measured the population of the rural district as 4,748 in 1,155 households. The most populous of its 62 villages was Mand-e Bala, with 1,119 people.
