= Iranian Kurdistan =

Kurdish area of Iran

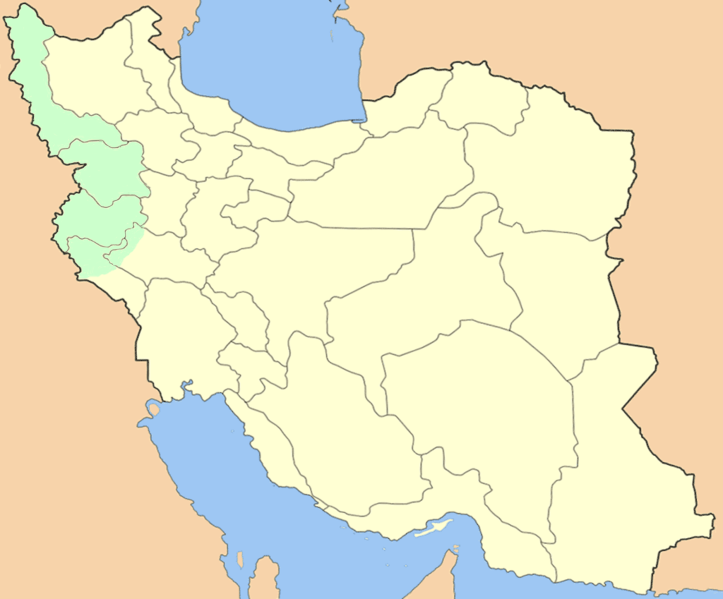
Map of Iranian Kurdistan. Kurds are the majority in Kurdistan, Kermanshah and West Azerbaijan.

Iranian Kurdistan and Eastern Kurdistan (Kurdish: ڕۆژھەڵاتی کوردستان, romanized: Rojhilatê Kurdistanê), also called Rojhelat, are unofficial names for the parts of northwestern Iran with either a majority or sizable population of Kurds. Geographically, it includes the provinces of West Azerbaijan, Kurdistan, Kermanshah, and parts of the provinces of Ilam, Hamadan and Lorestan.

It has also been a centre of repeated Kurdish political mobilization in Iran, including the short lived Republic of Mahabad in 1946 and later armed conflict with the Islamic Republic after the 1979 revolution.

The region has long been marked by discrimination, militarization, and political repression, with Kurdish activists and people suspected of links to Kurdish opposition groups facing arrest, torture, and severe sentences.

== History ==
=== Kurdish dynasties ===
From the 10th century to 12th century A.D., two Kurdish dynasties ruled this region, the Hasanwayhids (959–1015) and the Ayyarids (990–1117) (in Kermanshah, Dinawar, Ilam and Khanaqin). The Ardalan state, established in the early 14th century, controlled the territories of Zardiawa (Karadagh), Khanaqin, Kirkuk, Kifri, and Hawraman. The capital city of the state was first in Sharazour in present-day Iraqi Kurdistan, but was later moved to Sinne (Sanandaj) (in present-day Iran). The Ardalan Dynasty continued to rule the region until the Qajar monarch Naser al-Din Shah (1848–1896) ended their rule in 1867.

=== Seljukid and Khwarazmid eras ===
In the 12th century CE, Sultan Sanjar created a province called "Kurdistan" centered at Bahar, located to the northeast of Hamadan. This province included Hamadan, Dinawar, Kermanshah, Sanandaj and Sharazur. It was ruled by Sulayman, the nephew of Sanjar. In 1217, Kurds of Zagros defeated the troops of Ala ad-Din Muhammad II, the Khwarazmid shah, who were sent from Hamadan.

=== Safavid era ===
According to the Encyclopaedia of Islam, the Safavid dynasty came from Iranian Kurdistan, and later moved to Azerbaijan. They finally settled at Ardabil in the 11th century C.E. During the Safavid era, the government tried to extend its control over Kurdish-inhabited areas in western Iran. At that time, there were a number of semi-independent Kurdish emirates such as the Mukriyan (Mahabad), Ardalan (Sinne), and Shikak tribes around Lake Urmia and northwest Iran. Kurds resisted this policy and tried to keep some form of self-rule. This led to a series of bloody confrontations between the Safavids and the Kurds. The Kurds were finally defeated, and as a result the Safavids decided to punish rebellious Kurds by forced relocation and deportation in the 15–16th century. This policy began under the reign of the Safavid shah Tahmasp I (r. 1514–1576).

Between 1534 and 1535, Tahmasp I began the systematic destruction of the old Kurdish cities and the countryside. Large numbers of Kurds from these areas found themselves deported to the Alborz mountains and Khorasan, as well as the heights in the central Iranian Plateau. At this time the last remnant of the ancient royal Hadhabâni (Adiabene) tribe of central Kurdistan was removed from the heartland of Kurdistan and deported to Khorasan, where they are still found today.

The Safavid era played a substantial role in the integration of Iranian Kurdistan into the political structure of Iran. The Kurdish local elites were strongly aware of their affiliation with Iran, which helped shape Iran's western border.

=== Battle of DimDim ===
There is a well documented historical account of a long battle in 1609–1610 between Kurds and the Safavid Empire. The battle took place around a fortress called Dimdim located in Beradost region around Lake Urmia in northwestern Iran. In 1609, the ruined structure was rebuilt by Emîr Xan Lepzêrîn ("Golden Hand Khan"), ruler of Beradost, who sought to maintain the independence of his expanding principality in the face of both Ottoman and Safavid penetration into the region. Rebuilding Dimdim was considered a move toward independence that could threaten Safavid power in the northwest. Many Kurds, including the rulers of Mukriyan (Mahabad), rallied around Amir Khan. After a long and bloody siege led by the Safavid grand vizier Hatem Beg, which lasted from November 1609 to the summer of 1610, Dimdim was captured. All the defenders were massacred. Shah Abbas ordered a general massacre in Beradost and Mukriyan (reported by Eskandar Beg Turkoman, Safavid historian, in the book Alam Aray-e Abbasi) and resettled the Turkish Afshar tribe in the region while deporting many Kurdish tribes to Khorasan. Although Persian historians (like Eskandar Beg) depicted the first battle of Dimdim as a result of Kurdish mutiny or treason, in Kurdish oral traditions (Beytî dimdim), literary works (Dzhalilov, pp. 67–72), and histories, it was treated as a struggle of the Kurdish people against foreign domination. In fact, Beytî dimdim is considered a national epic second only to Mem û Zîn by Ahmad Khani. The first literary account of Dimdim battle was written by Faqi Tayran.

=== Afsharid era ===
Kurds took advantage of the Afghan invasion of the Safavid realm in the early 18th century, and conquered Hamadan and penetrated to the area near Isfahan. Nader Shah sought to suppress a Kurdish rebellion in 1747, but he was assassinated before completing the expedition. After Nader's death, Kurdish tribes exploited the power vacuum and captured parts of Fars.

=== Qajar era ===
In 1880, Shaykh Ubaydullah, a Kurdish leader, engaged in a series of revolts against the Iranian government. These revolts were successfully suppressed by the Qajar shahs, and this was one of Iran's few victories during the Qajar era. In the early 20th century, Ismail Agha Simko took advantage of the chaotic situation in the aftermath of World War I and rebelled against the Iranian government. He was finally defeated by Reza Shah Pahlavi.

=== Modern Iran ===
==== Simko revolts against Reza Shah ====
The weakness of the Iranian government during World War I encouraged some Kurdish chiefs to take advantage of the chaotic situation. Simko, chief of the Shikak tribe, established his authority in the area west of Lake Urmia from 1918 to 1922. Jaafar Sultan of Hewraman region took control of the region between Marivan and north of Halabja and remained independent until 1925. In 1922, Reza Khan (who later became the first Pahlavi monarch), took action against Kurdish leaders. Simko was forced to abandon his region in the fall of 1922, and spent eight years in hiding. When the Iranian government persuaded him to submit, he was ambushed and killed around Ushno (Oshnavieh) in 1930. After this, Reza Shah pursued a crude but effective policy against the Kurds. Hundreds of Kurdish chiefs were deported and forced into exile. Their lands were also confiscated by the government.

==== World War II ====
When Allied troops entered Iran in September 1941, the Iranian Army was quickly dissolved and their ammunition was seized by the Kurds.

Sons of the Kurdish chiefs seized the opportunity and escaped from their exile in Tehran. Hama Rashid, a Kurdish chief from Baneh, took control of Sardasht, Baneh and Mariwan in western Iran. He was finally driven out of the region by the Iranian Army in the autumn of 1944.

===== Republic of Kurdistan in Mahabad =====
Flag of the Republic of Mahabad.

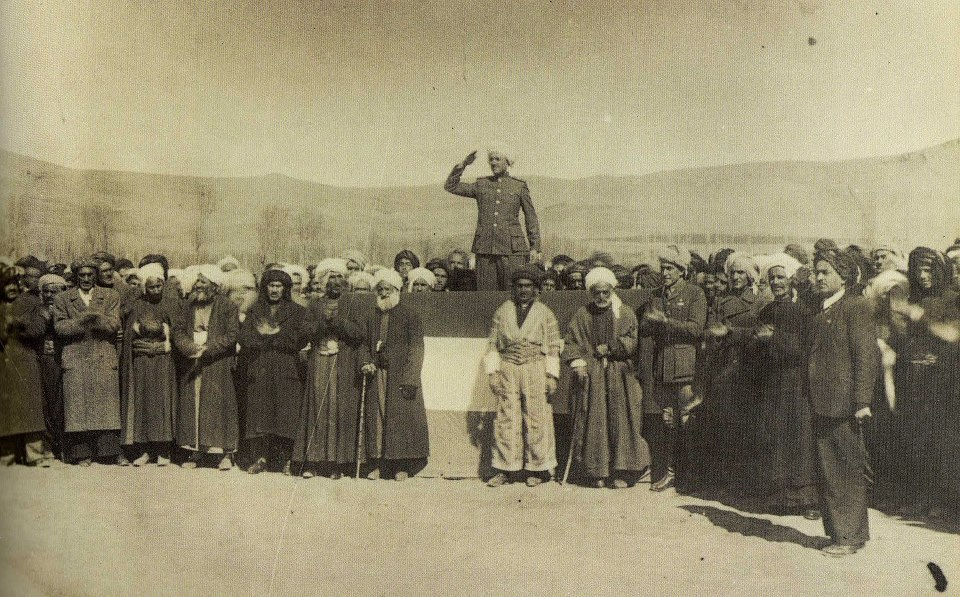
Qazi Muhammed establishing the Republic of Mahabad.

Although Iran had declared its neutrality in the Second World War, it was occupied by Allied forces. With support from the Soviet Union, a Kurdish state was created in the city of Mahabad in 1946 by the Kurdish Movement Komeley Jiyanewey Kurd under the leadership of Qazi Muhammad. Since the minuscule entity extended no further than the small cities of Mahabad, Bukan, Piranshahr, and Oshnaviyeh in Iran, not even all of Iranian Kurdistan supported the experiment, let alone the Kurds in other states. The Republic of Mahabad, as it is often called, lasted less than a year, as the end of the war and the withdrawal of the occupying Soviet forces allowed the central government to defeat the separatists and return Kurdistan to Iran.

==== Islamic Revolution and the Kurds ====
Kurdish political organizations strongly supported the revolution that overthrew Mohammad Reza Shah that culminated in Ayatollah Khomeini's rise to power in February 1979. The Shah had opposed Kurdish demands for greater autonomy and less interference from Tehran, but relations between Kurdish groups and the new authorities soon became tense, as the government regarded the Kurds' distinct language, traditions, and cross-border ties as potential channels for foreign influence.

Tensions worsened when Kurdish representatives were excluded from the 1979 Assembly of Experts, the body charged with drafting the new constitution. Abdul Rahman Ghassemlou, who had been elected from the region, was prevented by Khomeini from taking part in its opening session, and the constitution that emerged left the mainly Sunni Kurdish population without full political rights.

The wave of nationalism engulfed eastern Kurdistan after the fall of the Pahlavi dynasty in line with a series of anti-revolutionary revolts across the country. In early 1979, fighting broke out between Kurdish armed groups and the security forces of Iran's new revolutionary government. The main Kurdish organizations involved were the Democratic Party of Iranian Kurdistan (KDPI), and the left-wing Komala, also known as the Revolutionary Organization of Kurdish Toilers.

In a speech in December 1979, Ayatollah Khomeini called the concept of ethnic minorities contrary to Islamic doctrines. He also accused those opposed to unity among Muslim countries of stirring up nationalism among minorities. His views were shared by many in the clerical leadership.

During the first fifteen years after the revolution, about 10,000-50,000 Kurds in Iran were estimated to have been killed, including during the Iran-Iraq War, and over 271 Kurdish villages in Iran were destroyed. In 1993, air strikes hit 113 villages, and Iranian Kurdistan was placed under military control with roughly 200,000 troops permanently stationed in the region. The militarization of the region also enabled Iran to pursue policies aimed at consolidating state control. These included the expansion of military projects, the seizure of land, the diversion of water resources, and efforts to strengthen the cultural dominance of the central state. Such measures were accompanied by economic development strategies that favoured a single ethno-religious framework.

===== Kurdish movement between Shia Kurds in southern Iranian Kurdistan =====
David McDowall has argued that since the 1990s Kurdish nationalism has seeped into the Shia Kurdish area partly due to outrage against government's violent suppression of Kurds farther north, but David Romano reject such claims noting that there's no evidence of an active guerrilla insurgency in the area. Although, there is a new rise of Kurdish identity movement in the southern parts of Iranian Kurdistan, which has risen up from the first decade of 21st century that shows itself in the way of formation of an armed group called the Partisans of Southern Kurdistan and some other organizations specially about Yarsani people of that parts of Kurdistan.

==== 1996 demonstrations ====
On December 2, 1996, the death of a prominent Sunni clergyman, Mulla Mohammed Rabiei, in Kermanshah led to violent clashes between Sunni Kurds and the security forces. Mulla Rabiei was the prayer leader in the Al-Shafe'i mosque in Kermanshah. The protests continued for three days and spread to neighboring towns in the region.

==== Khatami period ====
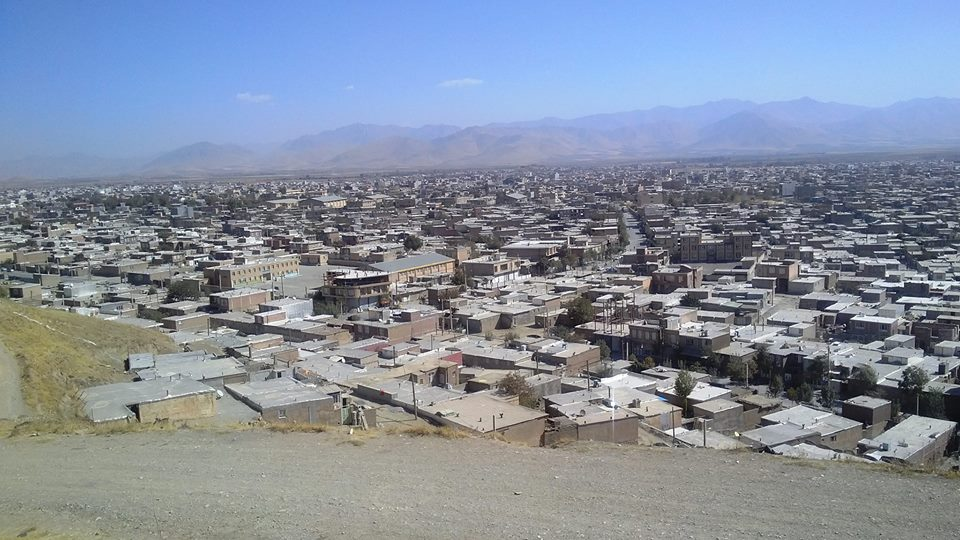
Piranshahr in West Azerbaijan

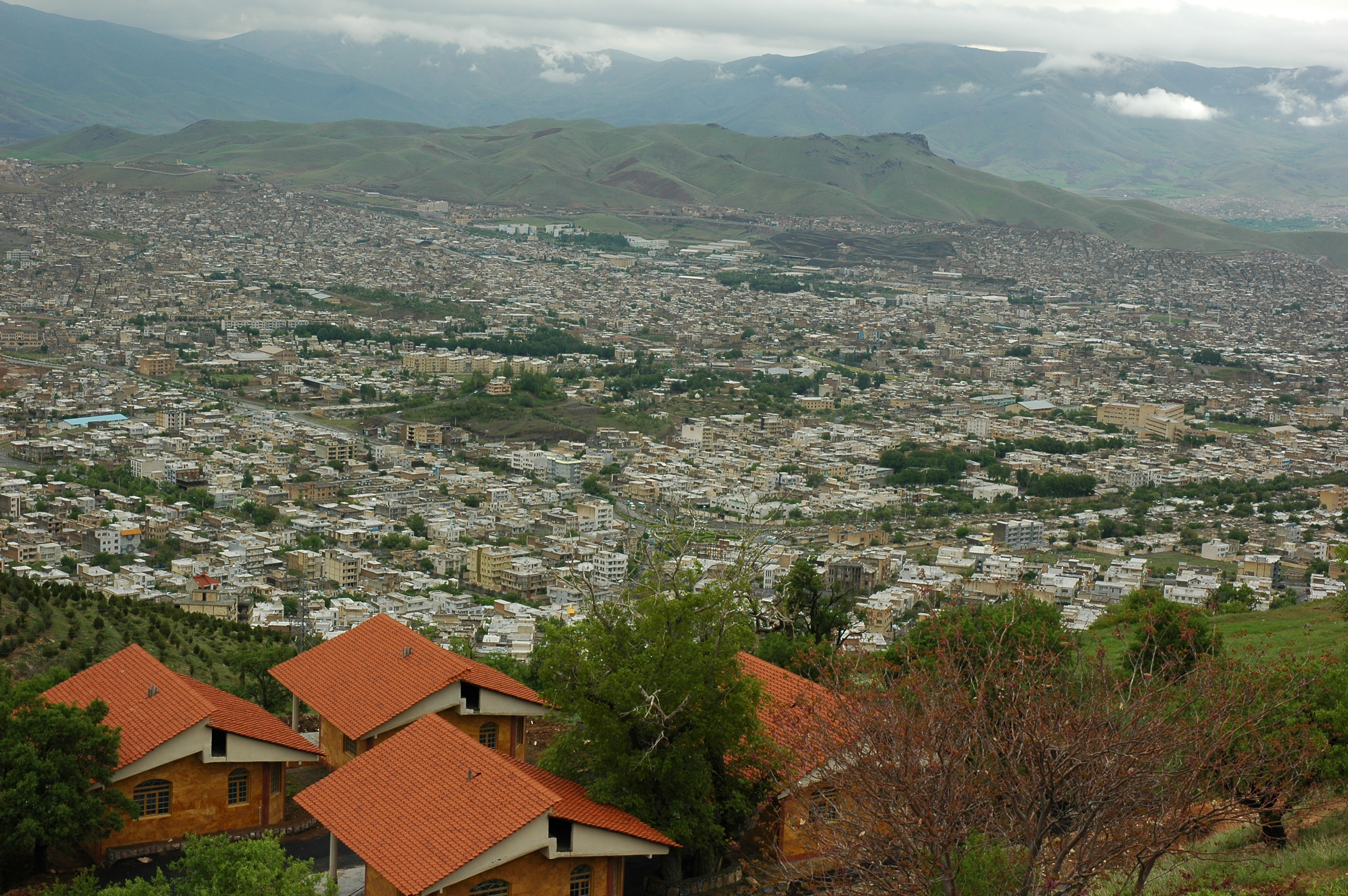
A view of Sanandaj, the second-largest city in Iranian Kurdistan

Reformist president Mohammad Khatami was the first senior politician to acknowledge the exclusion of Iran's Kurds from political and economic power. His promise to address these issues attracted more Kurdish voters than any previous candidate since 1979. Both civilian and military Kurdish opposition groups also urged Kurds to participate in the election. Khatami praised the glory of Kurdish culture and history, while Kurdish demands were mainly related to the Kurdish language and the inclusion of Kurds in senior positions.

Khatami was chosen in 1997. During his first term, Khatami chose Abdollah Ramezanzadeh to be the first Kurdish governor of the Iranian province of Kurdistan. He also appointed several Sunni and Shia Kurds as his own or cabinet members' advisors.

Following the 2000 parliamentary election, the stronger Kurdish presence in the sixth parliament raised hopes that some of their constituents' demands would be addressed. After 18 Kurds won seats in the first round, one candidate said he expected expanded Kurdish-language instruction at the University of Sanandaj and urged Khatami's government to appoint more Kurdish officials. A 40-member parliamentary bloc was later formed to represent the mainly Kurdish provinces of Kurdistan, Luristan, and Kermanshah. Those hopes were ultimately frustrated. In September 2001, parliamentarians from Kurdistan Province attempted to resign collectively in protest at discrimination against Kurdish and Sunni communities. They criticized Khatami for neglecting Kurdish grievances and complained of poverty, limited university access, and the Interior Ministry's failure to consult them over the replacement of the popular governor Ramezanzadeh. Disappointment over Khatami's inability to fulfill those promises contributed to a decline in Kurdish turnout, from about 79% in his first election to roughly 53% in his re-election campaign. In his second term, Khatami had two Kurdish cabinet members; both of them were Shia.

Many other civilian Kurdish activists, however, remained outside the reform movement. Among them was Mohammad Sadiq Kaboudvand, who founded an independent human rights organization to defend Kurdish rights. His organization was later declared illegal.

===== 1999 demonstrations =====
In February 1999, Kurdish nationalists took to the streets in several cities such as Mahabad, Sanandaj and Urmia and staged mass protests against the government and in support of Abdullah Öcalan. This was viewed as "trans-nationalization" of the Kurdish movement. These protests were violently suppressed by the government forces. According to human rights groups, at least 20 people were killed.

===== The Shivan Qaderi incident =====
On July 9, 2005, a Kurdish opposition activist, Shivan Qaderi (also known as Shwane Qadri or Sayed Kamal Asfaram), and two other Kurdish men were shot by Iranian security forces in Mahabad.

For the next six weeks, riots and protests erupted in Kurdish towns and villages throughout Eastern Kurdistan such as Mahabad, Piranshahr. Sinne (Sanandaj), Sardasht, Oshnavieh (Şino), Baneh, Bokan and Saqiz The unrest also spread beyond Kurdish areas, prompting protests in southwestern Iran and in Baluchistan in the east. Many people were killed or wounded, and large numbers were detained without charge. The authorities also closed several leading Kurdish newspapers and detained reporters and editors.

On 13 March 2006, Saleh Nikbakht, a prominent Iranian human rights lawyer representing Qaderi, said that the person who killed him was a police officer who had unlawfully opened fire. He also stated that both the shooter and the official who gave the order were being investigated, and that the judiciary had so far cooperated.

==== Execution of political prisoners ====
In November 2009, Iran executed Ehsan Fattahian – the first of over a dozen political prisoners on death row – despite an international campaign calling for his release. Authorities accused Fattahian of carrying arms for an "illegal organization" and sentenced him to several years in prison. Fattahian never confessed to carrying arms and was not given a fair trial, nor was he permitted access to his lawyer, and the Komala – the illegal organization he was accused of associating with – claimed that he had left the group a long time ago. Fattahian attempted to appeal, and when he did so, he was sentenced to death for "enmity against God". His execution was condemned by human rights groups and activists internationally.

In January 2010, Iran executed a second Kurdish political prisoner, Fasih Yasamani, for "enmity against God". Like Fattahian, Yasamani was tortured and authorities tried to force him to confess, but he refused. He was also denied a fair trial.

Without notifying the families or lawyers of the political prisoners, Iranian authorities ordered the execution of four more Kurdish political prisoners – Ali Heydarian, Farhad Vakili, Mehdi Eslamian, Shirin Alam Hooli, and Farzad Kamangar, a teacher who received a lot of attention internationally following his arrest – in Iran on May 9, 2010. The four political prisoners suffered severe torture at the hands of Iranian authorities and were also forced to confess to membership in the illegal PJAK. None of the activists were given fair trials nor did they have access to their lawyers. Amnesty International described the executions as "a blatant attempt to intimidate members of the Kurdish minority."

Despite repeated international calls demanding the release or retrial of these four political prisoners, all were executed without any prior notice or warning. Following the executions, Iranian authorities refused to return the bodies of those executed to their families.

By May 2010, at least 16 other Kurdish political prisoners were awaiting execution. There were no reports that any of them had received a fair trial.

==== Kurdish groups and self-determination ====
Several Kurdish organisations existed in Iran in the late twentieth and early twenty-first centuries, most advocating some form of self-determination. During early 2026, the Kurdish militia in the region began a revolt which has come to be known as the 2026 Kurdish–Iranian crisis. The rebels aimed to achieve the fall of the Iranian state and self determination.

In February 2026, the Coalition of Political Forces of Iranian Kurdistan (CPFIK) was formed as an alliance of major Iranian Kurdish parties. It emerged during the 2025–2026 internal crisis in Iran, amid rising Kurdish unrest. Its aim was to unite Kurdish forces in Iranian Kurdistan following the 2025–2026 protests, the resulting instability of the Islamic Republic of Iran, and the subsequent United States military buildup in the Middle East. The US has voiced support and possible aid to these groups who have united to form the CPFIK.

== Politics ==
=== Kurdish political parties in Iran ===
The main Iranian Kurdish political parties include the Kurdish Democratic Party of Iran, Komala, and PJAK. Civil political activity by Iranian Kurdish opposition parties, especially KDPI and Komala, is generally limited inside Iran because of state scrutiny. When such activity does take place, it is often carried out covertly to reduce the risk of repression. The parties also back other civic initiatives, including groups focused on environmental and social issues.

==== Kurdish Democratic Party of Iran ====
The Kurdish Democratic Party of Iran (KDPI) was founded in Mahabad on 16 August 1945. It has traditionally been regarded as the largest Iranian Kurdish party, and states that its aim is to secure Kurdish national rights within a federal and democratic Iran. In 2006, the Kurdistan Democratic Party (Iran) split from KPDI following a dispute at the latter's 13th convention over the choice of its next leader. The KDPI and Iran's Kurdistan Democratic Party (KDP-Iran) have been engaged in several rounds of reunification talks over the years.

==== Komala ====
The Komala Party of Iranian Kurdistan was founded in 1969 by Kurdish leftist students and intellectuals, many of them based in Tehran as well as in Kurdish towns. Grounded in socialist ideas, it advocates Kurdish rights within a democratic, secular, pluralist, and federal Iran. In 2018, Komala described itself as a social democratic party that has sought to expand its international contacts, particularly with other social democratic movements. It stated that it was affiliated with the Progressive Alliance and the Socialist International.

==== Kurdistan Free Life Party ====
PJAK, the Kurdistan Free Life Party, emerged in the late 1990s as an independent student-based human rights movement focused on promoting a Kurdish national identity. It is based in the Qandil Mountains near the borders of Iran, Iraq, and Turkey, and unlike Komala and KDPI it does not rely on support from the Kurdistan Regional Government.

=== Discrimination and persecution of Kurds ===
Kurds have suffered a long history of discrimination in Iran. When Iran transitioned from empire to nation-state in the 1920s, the Pahlavi monarchy gradually elevated Persian and Shia identities above the country's diverse ethnic groups, which had previously coexisted on broadly equal terms. Minority claims to political and social rights came to be viewed as threats to national security and territorial integrity. After the Islamic revolution, the new regime continued this policy, applying it with particular intensity toward Kurds, whose ethnic identity it considered incompatible with Islamic ideology. Khomeini set the tone in a 1979 speech when he denounced Kurdish leaders as the “evil of the earth”, and later that year characterized ethnic minorities and their ties to leftist movements as a serious threat to the new Islamic Republic. By 2024, the Islamic Republic continued to view Kurds as a threat to the country’s foundations.

Some scholars describe the state policies of the Islamic Republic as a form of systematic economic marginalization that has contributed to the underdevelopment of the region. These policies include restrictions on agriculture and animal husbandry, the displacement of rural populations through the construction of large dams, and the diversion of natural resources such as water to other parts of the country. Such measures have been interpreted as attempts to reshape the region’s economic structure and have further strained the livelihoods of Kurdish communities.

In Iran, constitutional rules legitimize the exclusion of Kurds. Non-Shi‘is are not allowed to stand as a presidential candidate, or become a member of the cabinet, the National Security Council, the Expediency Council, the Guardian Council, or the Assembly of Experts. (Note: Source says "Guardian Consul", "Consul of Experts". These organisations do not exist in Iran. Changed into Guardian Council and Assembly of Experts.) State institutions and legal frameworks have often disadvantaged non Persian and non Shia communities, including Kurds, who have also been absent from senior roles in the intelligence and military services.

Iranian Kurds face state discrimination affecting access to basic services, despite a constitutional guarantee of equal rights for all ethnic groups. In a report released in 2008, Amnesty International said that Kurds have been a particular target of the Islamic Republic of Iran, and the Kurds' "social, political and cultural rights have been repressed, as have their economic aspirations". As a result, many human rights activists in Iran often shift their focus to specifically identify the Iranian authorities' violations of human rights against the Kurdish minority. However, according to Amnesty International, Kurdish rights activists who link their Kurdish identity to their human rights work, including documenting the state's failure to uphold its international human rights obligations, risk further violations of their rights, and many have consequently been imprisoned or subjected to other forms of abuse.

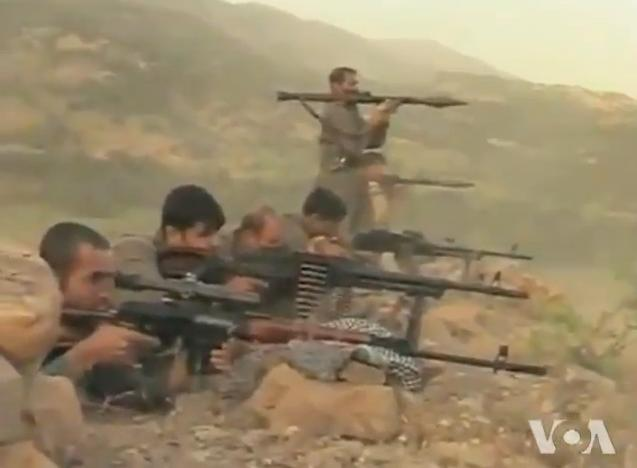
PJAK fighters in Iran

Those involved in Kurdish political parties, civil society, or cultural activities risk surveillance, arrest, detention, and prosecution on broadly defined security charges, which can result in lengthy prison sentences or even the death penalty. The Iranian authorities may view activities on behalf of Kurds, including social welfare and charitable work, as political. More broadly, involvement in any organized effort supporting Kurds can attract adverse official attention and may create a risk of persecution or ill-treatment. The Iranian authorities are highly sensitive to suspected Kurdish political activity or support for Kurdish rights. Even limited signs of involvement may give rise to suspicion, and the response can be severe. Arrests are carried out for a range of reasons, including real or suspected links to Kurdish opposition parties. Torture is reported most often during the early investigative stage, when it is used to force confessions. People identified, or believed to be affiliated, with Kurdish political parties are also more likely to receive severe punishments, including lengthy prison terms and death sentences.

At the beginning of the 21st century, a number of Kurdish activists, writers, and teachers were arrested for their work and were sentenced to death. The increase is likely due to the government's crackdown following the nationwide protests after Iran's presidential elections. Even before the elections, Kurdish rebel groups – specifically the Party for a Free Life in Kurdistan or PJAK – have taken up arms against the state.

Kurds are not permitted to receive education in their mother tongue. For example, in 2010 Iranian authorities banned the use of Kurdish in all schools in the city of Saqqez in Eastern Kurdistan, instructing teachers and other school staff to use only Persian.

The UK Upper Tribunal found that since 2016 the Iranian authorities had become more suspicious of Kurdish political activity, and that people of Kurdish ethnicity were therefore viewed with increased suspicion. The Iranian authorities may view social welfare and charitable work on behalf of Kurds as political. They may also treat involvement in organized support for Kurdish communities as political activity, which can draw adverse attention and, in some cases, lead to persecution.

Following the widespread Mahsa Amini protests that began in late 2022, reports described an increase in arrests, torture, and executions affecting minorities such as Kurds. By the end of 2022, executions were reported to have risen by 72%, with at least 582 people put to death by the authorities. In June 2023, the UN OHCHR stated that death sentences involving Kurds appeared to be disproportionate. By July 2023, in response to the authorities’ harsh response to the protesters, many Iranian Kurds had fled to Iraq.

==== Religious discrimination ====
The Kurds make up Iran's largest religious minority. Kurdish regions are religiously diverse, and their inhabitants follow a range of faiths, including Islam, Christianity, Syriac Christianity, Judaism, and Yarsanism. However, most Kurds are Muslims and adhere to Sunni Islam of the Shafi'i school. In the Islamic Republic of Iran, religious differences have intensified tensions between Sunni Kurds and the country's Shi'a leadership. Discrimination against Kurds in Iran is based on ethnicity, language, and religion.

In 1993, a newly built Sunni mosque in Sanandaj, the second-largest Kurdish city, was destroyed by a mob of Shi'a zealots.

For many years, Sunnis in Tehran have tried to obtain approval for a mosque of their own, but the authorities have repeatedly refused. Under the Pahlavi monarchy, which governed Iran from 1925 to 1979, Sunnis were not allowed to obtain authorization to build a mosque. During the 1979 revolution, Ayatollah Khomeini initially said they would be allowed to do so, but after coming to power he reversed that position. By 2011, Iranian authorities had not allowed Sunnis to build their own mosques in Tehran since the 1979 revolution. As of 2015, Iran's major cities had no Sunni mosques, including Tehran, even though more than a million Sunnis live there, many of them Kurds.

==== Regional disparities ====
Since the rebellion, Iran's Kurdistan region has experienced economic underdevelopment, political marginalization, and heavy militarization. In autumn 2022, the region recorded the country’s highest unemployment rate at 13.8%. In the Kurdish Kermanshah province the rate reached 17.4%, compared with a national average of 8.2%.

Employment opportunities are limited, and discriminatory hiring practices have been cited as contributing to persistently high unemployment and weak economic prospects. A government report for 2019–2020 also noted that about 66.8% of employment in Kurdistan province occurs in the informal sector, where jobs typically lack insurance and retirement benefits. The prevalence of informal work has been linked to limited private sector development, insufficient investment, and weak legal protections and enforcement.

== Demographics ==
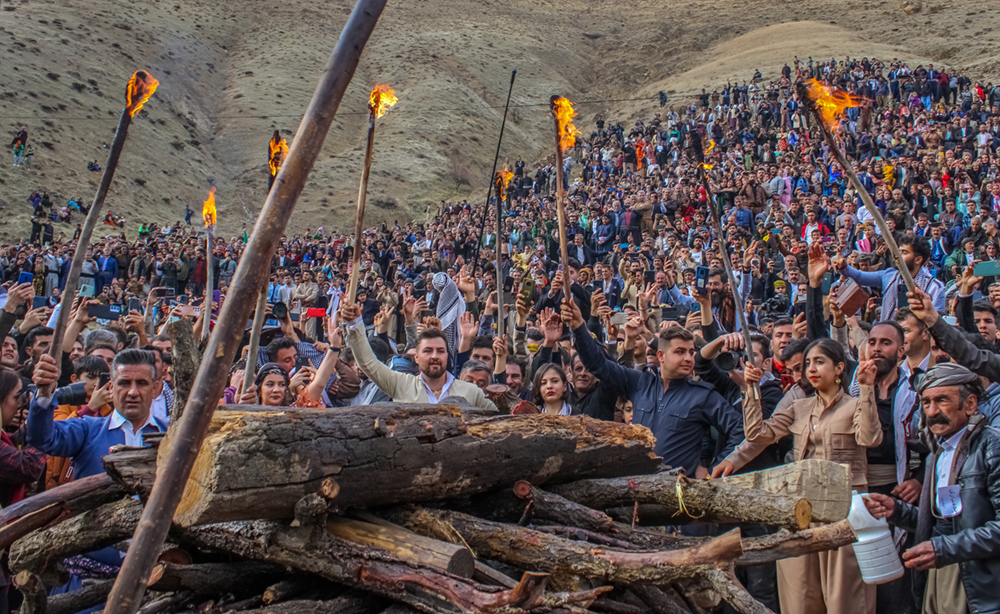
Kurds celebrating Nowruz in Iranian Kurdistan in 2024.

An estimated 25 million to 35 million Kurds live across the broader Middle East. Kurds generally regard northwestern Iran, known as Eastern Kurdistan, as one of the four parts of Greater Kurdistan. In this view, the other parts are in southeastern Turkey (Northern Kurdistan), northern Syria (Western Kurdistan), and northern Iraq (Southern Kurdistan).

In totality, Kurds are about 10% of Iran's total population and nearly all of them are bilingual in their ethnic language and Persian. As of 2025, estimates of Iran's Kurdish population range from 7 million to 15 million, or about 8% to 17% of the country's total population.

Outside the traditional Kurdistan region, a sizable isolated community of Kurds live in north-eastern Iran, about 1000 km away from Iranian Kurdistan. They are referred to as the Kurds of Khorasan and speak the Kurmanji dialect unlike Kurds in western Iran.

== See also ==
- Death of Mahsa Amini
- Gawirkayeti
- Kolbar
- Kurdistan
- Kurdistan province
- Kurds in Iran
- Mahsa Amini protests
- Whole Azerbaijan
- Woman, Life, Freedom
