= Vakili =

Vakili may refer to:

- Vakili, Iran, a village in Golestan Province, Iran
- Monir Vakili (1923-1983), Iranian singer
- Farhad Vakili, Iranian Kurdish activist
- Anna Vakili
- Vakili, Azerbaijan, Iran Governor of Ardebil Province 19th century
