= Kahnok Ladi =

Kahnok Ladi كهنك لدي
- Village
- Location within Iran
- Coordinates: 27°32′13″N 59°25′33″E
- Country: Iran
- Province: Sistan and Baluchestan
- County: Dalgan
- Bakhsh: Central
- Rural District: Dalgan

Population (2006)
  - Total: 829
- Time zone: UTC+3:30 (IRST)
  - Summer (DST): UTC+4:30 (IRDT)

Kahnok Ladi (Persian: كهنك لدي, also Romanized as Kahnok Ladī) is a village in Dalgan Rural District, in the Central District of Dalgan County, Sistan and Baluchestan Province, Iran. At the 2006 census, its population was 829, in 163 families.
