= Sabuni =

Sabuni is a surname. Notable people with the surname include:

- Dusman Sabuni, (d. 2000), Ugandan military officer and rebel militant leader
- Nur al-Din al-Sabuni, (d. 1184), Islamic scholar
- Nyamko Sabuni, (born 1969), Burundian-born Swedish politician

== See also ==
- Seh Boni, a village in Iran also spelled Sabuni
