= Hidan =

Hidan may refer to:

- The Hidan of Maukbeiangjow, a film
- Hidan (Naruto), a fictional character in the anime and manga series Naruto
- Hidan, Iran, a village in Sistan and Baluchestan Province
