= Gonbad-e Alavi Rural District =

Rural district in Sistan and Baluchestan province, Iran

Gonbad-e Alavi Rural District Persian: دهستان گنبد علوی
- Rural District
- Location within Iran
- Coordinates: 27°36′01″N 59°03′44″E
- Country: Iran
- Province: Sistan and Baluchestan
- County: Dalgan
- District: Central
- Capital: Gonbad-e Alavi

Population (2016)
  - Total: 7,873
- Time zone: UTC+3:30 (IRST)

Gonbad-e Alavi Rural District (Persian: دهستان گنبد علوی) is in the Central District of Dalgan County, Sistan and Baluchestan province, Iran. Its capital is the village of Gonbad-e Alavi.

== History ==
After the 2006 National Census, Dalgan District was separated from Iranshahr County in the establishment of Dalgan County, and Gonbad-e Alavi Rural District was created in the new Central District.

== Demographics ==
=== Population ===
At the time of the 2011 census, the rural district's population was 7,629 in 1,576 households. The 2016 census measured the population of the rural district as 7,873 in 1,821 households. The most populous of its 16 villages was Chah-e Kichi, with 2,582 people.
