= Nan-e Shekari =

Iranian sweet

- Alternative names: نان شکری
- Type: Pastry
- Place of origin: Iran
- Region or state: Rojhalat including Kermanshah
- Main ingredients: Egg, Flour, Sugar, Oil

Nan-e Shekari (Persian: نان شکری) is the name of a type of sweet that is prepared in the cities of Rojhalat like Kermanshah, Sanandaj and Saqqez and is known as one of the souvenirs of this city. This sweet is so called because of the use of sugar to decorate it. Dinner Nan-e Shekari is sometimes baked with Clarified butter.

== Recipes ==
Eggs, flour, sugar powder, Kermanshahi oil or butter, brewed saffron, vanilla and cardamom are used to prepare the dough for this sweet. Sugar is also used to decorate sweets, which is why it is called "Nan-e Shekari" which means sugar bread. Confectionery workshops in Kermanshah bake Nan-e Shekari in the oven.
