= Ehsan Fatahian =

Iranian Kurdish activist

- Ehsan Fatahian
- Born: 1982; Kermanshah, Iran
- Died: November 11, 2009 (aged 26–27); Sanandaj Central Prison, Iran
- Cause of death: executed
- Occupation: Komala militant

Ehsan Fatahian (Persian: احسان فتاحیان; Kurdish: ئیحسان فەتاحیان; b. 1982 in Kermanshah - d. November 11, 2009 in Sanandaj), was a Kurdish activist, who was executed on Wednesday, November 11, 2009, in Sanandaj Central Prison, after being sentenced to death by the Judiciary of the Islamic Republic, for allegedly being a member of the armed wing of Komalah. He was 28 years old.

== Life ==
Fatahian was born in the city of Kermanshah. He was arrested on July 20, 2008, in the Kurdish city of Kamyiaran by Iran's Revolutionary Guards. Accused of helping the Kurdish opposition group Komeleh and participating in "propaganda activities against the regime," he was originally sentenced to ten years in prison, but his sentence was later changed to death by hanging.

Human rights organizations denounced Fatahian's execution. Omid Memarian, a Human Rights Watch consultant, said: “The execution today is very alarming. We are faced with a new wave of violence by the government which is only comparable to the early days after the revolution.”

Amnesty International, Human Rights Watch and other human rights organizations had called for a halt on Fatahian's execution. More than 10,000 people signed an online petition in an effort to stop the execution. Prisoners at Sanandaj Prison, including Habibollah Latifi, Adnan Hassanpour, Anward Hossein Panahi, Arsalan Evliyayi, Jabril Khoroyi, Ronak Safazadeh and Fatemeh Goftari participated in a hunger strike to support Fatahian. Prisoners in Evin and Rajaishahr prisons, including Farzad Kamangar, Ali Heydariyan and Farhad Vakili, also participated in this hunger strike.

Protests following Fatahnian's execution in Azadi Square in Sanandaj resulted in many protesters being wounded and arrested. Amer Goli, a student, and Ako Kurdnasab, a journalist, were arrested following these protests.
