= Chegerdak =

City in Sistan and Baluchestan province, Iran

Chegerdak Persian: چگردك
- City
- Location within Iran
- Coordinates: 27°05′17″N 59°06′53″E
- Country: Iran
- Province: Sistan and Baluchestan
- County: Dalgan
- District: Jolgeh-ye Chah Hashem

Population (2016)
  - Total: 2,742
- Time zone: UTC+3:30 (IRST)

Chegerdak (Persian: چگردك) is a city in, and the capital of, Jolgeh-ye Chah Hashem District of Dalgan County, Sistan and Baluchestan province, Iran. It also serves as the administrative center for Jolgeh-ye Chah Hashem Rural District.

== Demographics ==
=== Population ===
At the time of the 2006 National Census, Chegerdak's population was 1,684 in 307 households, when it was a village in Jolgeh-ye Chah Hashem Rural District of the former Dalgan District of Iranshahr County. The following census in 2011 counted 2,579 people in 571 households, by which time the district had been separated from the county in the establishment of Dalgan County. The rural district was transferred to the new Jolgeh-ye Chah Hashem District. The 2016 census measured the population of the village as 2,742 people in 658 households. It was the most populous village in its rural district.

After the census, Chegerdak was elevated to the status of a city.
