= Ako Kurdnasab =

Kurdish journalist

Ako Kurdnasab (born 1983 or 1984) is a Kurdish former journalist for the weekly Kurdish journal Krafto. Krafto, based in Sanandaj, the capital of the Kurdistan province of Iran, was closed by the authorities in 2008.

Kurdnasab was arrested in a polling station in December 2006 while covering municipal elections. Reporters Without Borders and other organizations condemned his arrest.

Kurdnasab was released on bail on January 3, 2007 but re-arrested on July 23, 2007, because he expressed support for imprisoned journalists Adnan Hassanpour and Abdolwahed Butimar. On September 10, 2007, Kurdnasab was charged with "espionage," "actions against national security," and "attempts to overthrow the government by means of journalistic activities." He was sentenced to three years in prison. His sentence was reduced to six months in prison on November 13, 2007, after an appeals court overturned the espionage charge but confirmed the charge of “trying to overthrow the government using journalistic activities.” “We welcome the quashing of Kurdnasab’s espionage conviction, but the fact remains that a journalist should not be imprisoned for what he writes and we therefore call for the entire conviction to be overturned and for him to be released unconditionally,” Reporters Without Borders said. The European Union also called for Kurdnasab's release.

Ako Kurdnasab was released from prison on January 17, 2008.

Kurdnasab was arrested on November 12, 2009, following his participation in protests of the execution of Ehsan Fatahian. He was released on bail on November 30.
