= Damitun =

Damitun (Persian: دميتون) may refer to:

- Damitun-e Bala
- Damitun-e Pain
