= Azarabad Rural District =

Rural district in Sistan and Baluchestan province, Iran

Azarabad Rural District Persian: دهستان آذرآباد
- Rural District
- Location within Iran
- Coordinates: 27°05′01″N 59°25′20″E
- Country: Iran
- Province: Sistan and Baluchestan
- County: Dalgan
- District: Jolgeh-ye Chah Hashem
- Capital: Azarabad
- Time zone: UTC+3:30 (IRST)

Azarabad Rural District (Persian: دهستان آذرآباد) is in Jolgeh-ye Chah Hashem District of Dalgan County, Sistan and Baluchestan province, Iran. Its capital is the village of Azarabad, whose population at the time of the 2016 National Census was 433 in 112 households.

== History ==
After the 2006 census, Dalgan District was separated from Iranshahr County in the establishment of Dalgan County. Azarabad Rural District was created in Jolgeh-ye Chah Hashem District after the 2016 census.
