= Hosseinpour =

Hosseinpour is a surname. Notable people with the surname include:

- Amir Hosseinpour, Iranian opera director and choreographer
- Ardeshir Hosseinpour (1962–2007), Iranian nuclear scientist, physics professor, and electromagnetism expert
- Bozorgmehr Hosseinpour (born 1976), Iranian cartoonist, comic artist and art director
- Mohammad Hosseinpour (born 1993), Iranian footballer
- Saeid Hosseinpour (born 1998), Iranian footballer

== See also ==
- Hassanpour
