= Khuda Bux Rajar =

Pakistani politician

Haji Khuda Bux Rajar

Member of National Assembly of Pakistan

Personal details
- Born: Sanghar District, Sindh
- Citizenship: Pakistani
- Party: GDA (2024–present)

Haji Khuda Bux Rajar (Urdu: حاجی خدا بخش راجڑ) is a Pakistani politician from Sanghar District, Sindh. He is also a Federal Minister of Pakistan appointed by President of Pakistan, Asif Ali Zardari in 2010. He is also a Member of National Assembly of Pakistan elected in Sanghar District.
