= Sardasht Rural District =

Sardasht Rural District (Persian: دهستان سردشت) may refer to:

- Sardasht Rural District (Lordegan County), Chaharmahal and Bakhtiari province
- Sardasht Rural District (Hormozgan Province)
- Sardasht Rural District (Behbahan County), Khuzestan province
- Sardasht Rural District (Dezful County), Khuzestan province
