= Khoda Bakhsh Jadegal Tukani =

Khoda Bakhsh Jadegal Tukani خدا بخش جدگال توكاني
- Village
- Country: Iran
- Province: Sistan and Baluchestan
- County: Chabahar
- Bakhsh: Central
- Rural District: Pir Sohrab

Population (2006)
  - Total: 224
- Time zone: UTC+3:30 (IRST)
  - Summer (DST): UTC+4:30 (IRDT)

Khoda Bakhsh Jadegal Tukani (Persian: خدا بخش جدگال توكاني, also Romanized as Khodā Bakhsh Jadegāl Tūkānī) is a village in Pir Sohrab Rural District, in the Central District of Chabahar County, Sistan and Baluchestan Province, Iran. At the 2006 census, its population was 224, in 32 families.
