= Kalateh-ye Khoda Bakhsh =

Kalateh-ye Khoda Bakhsh كلاته خدابخش
- Village
- Location within Iran
- Coordinates: 32°39′12″N 59°20′05″E
- Country: Iran
- Province: South Khorasan
- County: Khusf
- Bakhsh: Jolgeh-e Mazhan
- Rural District: Barakuh

Population (2006)
  - Total: 22
- Time zone: UTC+3:30 (IRST)
  - Summer (DST): UTC+4:30 (IRDT)

Kalateh-ye Khoda Bakhsh (Persian: كلاته خدابخش, also Romanized as Kalāteh-ye Khodā Bakhsh and Kalāteh Khuda Bakhsh; also known as Ḩoseynābād-e ʿAlī Moḥammad (Persian: حسين اباد علي محمد) and Khodābakhsh) is a village in Barakuh Rural District, Jolgeh-e Mazhan District, Khusf County, South Khorasan Province, Iran. At the 2006 census, its population was 22, in 6 families.
