= Khodabakhsh-e Zaval =

Khodabakhsh-e Zaval خدابخش زوال
- Village
- Location within Iran
- Coordinates: 30°20′59″N 51°27′28″E
- Country: Iran
- Province: Fars
- County: Rostam
- Bakhsh: Central
- Rural District: Rostam-e Yek

Population (2006)
  - Total: 34
- Time zone: UTC+3:30 (IRST)
  - Summer (DST): UTC+4:30 (IRDT)

Khodabakhsh-e Zaval (Persian: خدابخش زوال, also Romanized as Khodābakhsh-e Zavāl; also known as Khodābakhsh) is a village in Rostam-e Yek Rural District, in the Central District of Rostam County, Fars province, Iran. At the 2006 census, its population was 34, in 6 families.
