= Galmurti =

City in Sistan and Baluchestan province, Iran

Galmurti Persian: گلمورتي
- City
- Location within Iran
- Coordinates: 27°28′57″N 59°26′47″E
- Country: Iran
- Province: Sistan and Baluchestan
- County: Dalgan
- District: Central

Population (2016)
  - Total: 10,292
- Time zone: UTC+3:30 (IRST)

Galmurti (Persian: گلمورتي) (Note: Also romanized as Galmūrtī) is a city in the Central District of Dalgan County, Sistan and Baluchestan province, Iran, serving as capital of both the county and the district. It is also the administrative center for Dalgan Rural District.

== Demographics ==
=== Population ===
At the time of the 2006 National Census, the city's population was 2,999 in 628 households, when it was capital of the former Dalgan District of Iranshahr County. The following census in 2011 counted 8,310 people in 1,744 households, by which time the district had been separated from the county in the establishment of Dalgan County. Galmurti was transferred to the new Central District as the county's capital. The 2016 census measured the population of the city as 10,292 people in 2,450 households.
