= Mian Bakhsh Laghari =

Pakistani (Sindhi) scholar

Mian Bakhsh Laghari

Professor Mian Bakhsh Laghari (Urdu: پروفیسر میاں بخش لغاری) was a Pakistani (Siraiki) and Baloch scholar who translated many books from Sindhi to English and English to Sindhi.

== Early life ==
Mian Bakhsh Laghari was born on 1944 in the village of Jaffer Khan Laghari in district Sangher, Sindh, Pakistan. His family ancestry might go back to Dera Ghazi Khan and Multan from where the forefathers migrated and settled in Sangher.

== Death ==
He died in a road accident near Jamshoro, Sindh Pakistan on December 25, 1999, at the age of 55.

== Bibliography ==
- Islāmiyāt (اسلامیات)
