= Nukabad-e Sarhang =

Nukabad-e Sarhang نوك ابادسرهنگ
- Village
- Location within Iran
- Coordinates: 27°07′51″N 60°53′00″E
- Country: Iran
- Province: Sistan and Baluchestan
- County: Iranshahr
- Bakhsh: Central
- Rural District: Howmeh

Population (2006)
  - Total: 2,704
- Time zone: UTC+3:30 (IRST)
  - Summer (DST): UTC+4:30 (IRDT)

Nukabad-e Sarhang (Persian: نوك ابادسرهنگ, also Romanized as Nūkābād-e Sarhang; also known as Nook Abad, Nowkābād, and Nūkābād) is a village in Howmeh Rural District, in the Central District of Iranshahr County, Sistan and Baluchestan Province, Iran. At the 2006 census, its population was 2,704, in 567 families.
