= Khodabakhsh Jadegal =

Khodabakhsh Jadegal خدابخش جدگال
- Village
- Location within Iran
- Coordinates: 25°44′32″N 60°57′22″E
- Country: Iran
- Province: Sistan and Baluchestan
- County: Chabahar
- Bakhsh: Central
- Rural District: Pir Sohrab

Population (2006)
  - Total: 225
- Time zone: UTC+3:30 (IRST)
  - Summer (DST): UTC+4:30 (IRDT)

Khodabakhsh Jadegal (Persian: خدابخش جدگال, also Romanized as Khodābakhsh Jadegāl; also known as Khodābakhsh Bāzār) is a village in Pir Sohrab Rural District, in the Central District of Chabahar County, Sistan and Baluchestan Province, Iran. At the 2006 census, its population was 225, in 36 families.
