= Nukabad, Iranshahr =

Nukabad نوك اباد
- Village
- Location within Iran
- Coordinates: 27°11′39″N 60°36′39″E
- Country: Iran
- Province: Sistan and Baluchestan
- County: Iranshahr
- Bakhsh: Central
- Rural District: Howmeh

Population (2016)
  - Total: 4,983
- Time zone: UTC+3:30 (IRST)
  - Summer (DST): UTC+4:30 (IRDT)

Nukabad (Persian: نوك اباد, also Romanized as Nūkābād; also known as Shamsābād-e Sarhang) is a village in Howmeh Rural District, in the Central District of Iranshahr County, Sistan and Baluchestan province, Iran. At the 2016 census, its population was 4983, in 1085 families.
