= Ladi (given name) =

Ladi is a short version of Ladislav, and is a given name on its own. Notable people with the name include:

- Ladi Geisler (1927–2011), German musician
- Ladi Kwali (c. 1925–1984), Nigerian potter, ceramicist, and educator
- Ladi Ladebo (1942–2021), Nigerian filmmaker
