= Shahbik Zehi =

Shahbik Zehi شهبيك زهي
- Village
- Location within Iran
- Coordinates: 25°40′00″N 61°21′00″E
- Country: Iran
- Province: Sistan and Baluchestan
- County: Chabahar
- Bakhsh: Dashtiari
- Rural District: Bahu Kalat

Population (2006)
  - Total: 743
- Time zone: UTC+3:30 (IRST)
  - Summer (DST): UTC+4:30 (IRDT)

Shahbik Zehi (Persian: شهبيك زهي, also Romanized as Shahbīk Zehī; also known as Bāzār-e Khodābakhsh and Shahīk Zehī) is a village in Bahu Kalat Rural District, Dashtiari District, Chabahar County, Sistan and Baluchestan Province, Iran. At the 2006 census, its population was 743, in 117 families.
