= Telehdan-e Gamdad Bazar =

Telehdan-e Gamdad Bazar تله دان گمدادبازار
- Village
- Location within Iran
- Coordinates: 25°44′58″N 60°50′39″E
- Country: Iran
- Province: Sistan and Baluchestan
- County: Chabahar
- Bakhsh: Central
- Rural District: Pir Sohrab

Population (2006)
  - Total: 151
- Time zone: UTC+3:30 (IRST)
  - Summer (DST): UTC+4:30 (IRDT)

Telehdan-e Gamdad Bazar (Persian: تله دان گمدادبازار, also Romanized as Telehdān-e Gamdād Bāzār; also known as Nūkābād, Qamdād-e Bāzār, Taldān Nūkābād, and Telehdān) is a village in Pir Sohrab Rural District, in the Central District of Chabahar County, Sistan and Baluchestan Province, Iran. At the 2006 census, its population was 151, in 26 families.
