= Farzad Kamangar =

Executed Iranian Kurdish activist (1975–2010)

- Born: 23 May 1975; Kamyaran, Kurdistan Province, Iran
- Died: 9 May 2010 (aged 34); Evin Prison, Tehran, Iran
- Cause of death: Execution by Islamic Republic of Iran
- Occupations: Teacher, poet, journalist, human rights activist and social worker
- Website: FARZAD KAMANGAR

Farzad Kamangar (Persian: فرزاد کمانگر; c. 23 May 1975 – 9 May 2010) was an Iranian Kurdish teacher, poet, journalist, human rights activist and social worker from the city of Kamyaran, Iran who was executed on 9 May 2010.

== The Accusations and the Courts ==
Kamangar was prosecuted on charges of Mohareb "enmity towards God". An Islamic Revolutionary Court sentenced Kamangar to death on February 25, 2008, on charges against national security including being a member of PJAK and accusations of active participation in several bombing attacks among which was the 2006 explosion in the Iran-Turkey gas export pipeline. According to his lawyer, Khalil Bahramian, "Nothing in Kamangar’s judicial files and records demonstrates any links to the charges brought against him."

Bahramian, who was present during the closed-door court hearing, described it as

“Lasting no more than five minutes, with the Judge issuing his sentence without any explanation and then promptly leaving the room. ... I have seen absolutely zero evidence presented against Kamangar. In my forty years in the legal profession, I have never witnessed such a prosecution.”

For this denial, Kamangar was repeatedly tortured. Amnesty International reports that Kamangar was repeatedly beaten, flogged, and electrocuted, and that he suffered from spasms in his arms and legs as a result of the torture.

The Supreme Court officially confirmed Kamangar's death sentence on July 11, 2008.

Kamangar was one of the six political prisoners highlighted in the International Campaign for Human Rights in Iran's 18 September 2008 document "Rights Crisis Escalates, Faces and Cases from Ahmadinejad's Crackdown"

Kamangar participated in the hunger strike to protest the execution of Ehsan Fatahian.

== Human Rights Organizations' Reaction ==
Amnesty International, Education International, and other teachers' and human rights organizations have called for Kamangar's sentence to be commuted.

== Kamangar's Letters from Prison ==
Kamangar left behind a collection of letters. On the importance of these letters Professor Haidar Khezri and Tyler Fisher (University of Central Florida) write: "His letters from prison invite his readers to imagine higher possibilities, higher ideals beyond the Islamofascism that sought to obliterate his native language and liberties. As Iran’s authoritarian regime yoked the forces of theocratic fanaticism and the nation-state in the service of a Persian and Shi’a Islamic Republic, exclusive of and discriminatory towards ethno-racial and religious minorities, Kamangar counters with a primary school teacher’s mild-mannered defiance and irrepressible dreams." Heirs of Poetry and Rain: Farzad Kamangar’s Letter from Prison to His Students has been translated by Haidar Khezri and Tyler Fisher and has been published in Barricade: A Journal of Antifascism & Translation in 2023.

Kamangar in a piece describes his time at the prison as follows:

"...I spent close to a month in solitary isolation, at the end of the first floor, in section 113 [of the prison]. It had a horrible stench. During this period I was not allowed to have visits nor telephone calls with any member of my family. During the 3 months of solitary confinement I was not allowed to go out in the free air. After enduring these months they moved me to a bigger cell, cell number 10, a cell intended for several persons, and I spent close to two months there. Still I was not allowed to have any contact with a lawyer or my family...."

A part of Kamangar's letter "Be Strong Comrades":

"Is it possible to carry the heavy burden of being a teacher and be responsible for spreading the seeds of knowledge and still be silent? Is it possible to see the lumps in the throats of the students and witness their thin and malnourished faces and keep quiet? Is it possible to be in the year of no justice and fairness and fail to teach the H for Hope and E for Equality, even if such teachings land you in Evin Prison or result in your death?"

a quote from Farzad's letter to his students:

"Boys of the land of the sun, I know you cannot sit, sing, and laugh with your classmates anymore, because after the tragedy of becoming a man, you have to face the grief of having to “earn bread”. But Remember to not turn your backs on your poems, your songs, your Leyla’s and your dreams. Teach your children to be offspring of “poems and rain” of their land; for the present and tomorrow. I leave you to the wind and sunshine so that, in the near future, you will sing lessons of love and sincerity to our motherland.

Your childhood friend, playmate, and teacher"

== See also ==
- Ehsan Fatahian
- Islamic Revolutionary Court
- Ministry of Intelligence (Iran)
