= Dariush Hassanpour =

German politician (born 1996)

Member of the Bürgerschaft of Bremen
- Incumbent
- Assumed office 29 June 2023

Personal details
- Born: 12 September 1996 (age 29) Hamburg
- Party: Die Linke (since 2013)

Dariush Hassanpour Fard Khorashad (born 12 September 1996) is a German politician serving as a member of the Bürgerschaft of Bremen since 2023. He has served as chairman of the Left Youth Solid in Bremen since 2021.
