= Sar Dasht, Lorestan =

Sar Dasht سردشت
- Village
- Location within Iran
- Coordinates: 34°08′29″N 47°32′19″E
- Country: Iran
- Province: Lorestan
- County: Delfan
- Bakhsh: Kakavand
- Rural District: Kakavand-e Gharbi

Population (2006)
  - Total: 49
- Time zone: UTC+3:30 (IRST)
  - Summer (DST): UTC+4:30 (IRDT)

Sar Dasht (Persian: سردشت, also Romanized as Sardasht) is a village in Kakavand-e Gharbi Rural District, Kakavand District, Delfan County, Lorestan Province, Iran. At the 2006 census, its population was 49, in 7 families.
