= Sar Dasht, Bagh-e Malek =

Sar Dasht سردشت
- Village
- Location within Iran
- Coordinates: 31°23′42″N 49°52′41″E
- Country: Iran
- Province: Khuzestan
- County: Bagh-e Malek
- Bakhsh: Meydavud
- Rural District: Meydavud

Population (2006)
  - Total: 319
- Time zone: UTC+3:30 (IRST)
  - Summer (DST): UTC+4:30 (IRDT)

Sar Dasht (Persian: سردشت) is a village in Meydavud Rural District, Meydavud District, Bagh-e Malek County, Khuzestan Province, Iran. At the 2006 census, its population was 319, in 61 families.
