= Chal Shahin-e Khoda Bakhsh =

Chal Shahin-e Khoda Bakhsh چال شاهين خدابخش
- Village
- Location within Iran
- Coordinates: 31°00′28″N 50°52′26″E
- Country: Iran
- Province: Kohgiluyeh and Boyer-Ahmad
- County: Boyer-Ahmad
- Bakhsh: Ludab
- Rural District: Chin

Population (2006)
  - Total: 137
- Time zone: UTC+3:30 (IRST)
  - Summer (DST): UTC+4:30 (IRDT)

Chal Shahin-e Khoda Bakhsh (Persian: چال شاهين خدابخش, also Romanized as Chāl Shāhīn-e Khodā Bakhsh; also known as Chāl Chāhīn and Chāl Shāhīn) is a village in Chin Rural District, Ludab District, Boyer-Ahmad County, Kohgiluyeh and Boyer-Ahmad Province, Iran. At the 2006 census, its population was 137, in 27 families.
