= Nukabad (25°40′ N 61°25′ E), Dashtiari =

Nukabad نوك اباد
- Village
- Location within Iran
- Coordinates: 25°39′45″N 61°24′53″E
- Country: Iran
- Province: Sistan and Baluchestan
- County: Chabahar
- Bakhsh: Dashtiari
- Rural District: Bahu Kalat

Population (2006)
  - Total: 269
- Time zone: UTC+3:30 (IRST)
  - Summer (DST): UTC+4:30 (IRDT)

Nukabad (Persian: نوك اباد, also Romanized as Nūkābād) is a village in Bahu Kalat Rural District, Dashtiari District, Chabahar County, Sistan and Baluchestan Province, Iran. At the 2006 census, its population was 269, in 50 families.
