= Ab Konar, Khuzestan =

Ab Konar اب كنار
- Village
- Location within Iran
- Coordinates: 30°45′06″N 50°03′07″E
- Country: Iran
- Province: Khuzestan
- County: Behbahan
- Bakhsh: Tashan
- Rural District: Tashan-e Gharbi

Population (2006)
  - Total: 134
- Time zone: UTC+3:30 (IRST)
  - Summer (DST): UTC+4:30 (IRDT)

Ab Konar (Persian: اب كنار, also Romanized as Āb Konār; also known as Chehel Konār) is a village in Tashan-e Gharbi Rural District, Tashan District, Behbahan County, Khuzestan Province, Iran. At the 2006 census, its population was 134, in 26 families.
