= Kahnak, Bardsir =

Kahnak كهنك
- Village
- Location within Iran
- Coordinates: 29°45′51″N 56°42′28″E
- Country: Iran
- Province: Kerman
- County: Bardsir
- Bakhsh: Central
- Rural District: Mashiz

Population (2006)
  - Total: 196
- Time zone: UTC+3:30 (IRST)
  - Summer (DST): UTC+4:30 (IRDT)

Kahnak (Persian: كهنك; also known as Kahanū, Kahnag, and Kāhnu) is a village in Mashiz Rural District, in the Central District of Bardsir County, Kerman Province, Iran. At the 2006 census, its population was 196, in 43 families.
