= Farhad Vakili =

Iranian Kurdish activist

Farhad Vakili is an Iranian Kurdish activist, who has been sentenced to death by an Islamic Revolutionary Court, for allegedly being a member of the armed group, the Kurdistan Workers Party (PKK).

The Child Rights Information Network called Vakili's trial a "grossly flawed process that fell far short of international standards for a fair trial."
