= Kohnak, Khuzestan =

Kohnak كهنك
- Village
- Location within Iran
- Coordinates: 32°15′21″N 48°36′38″E
- Country: Iran
- Province: Khuzestan
- County: Dezful
- Bakhsh: Choghamish
- Rural District: Choghamish

Population (2006)
  - Total: 1,520
- Time zone: UTC+3:30 (IRST)
  - Summer (DST): UTC+4:30 (IRDT)

Kohnak (Persian: كهنك, also Romanized as Kohonak; also known as Kahnag, Kāhūnak, Kohang, and Kūhānak) is a village in Choghamish Rural District, Choghamish District, Dezful County, Khuzestan Province, Iran. At the 2006 census, its population was 1,520, in 279 families.
