= Adnan Hassanpour =

Iranian-Kurdish journalist

Adnan Hassanpour (Persian: عدنان حسن پور; born 1974 or 1975) is an Iranian–Kurdish journalist who was sentenced to death in Iran in 2007 and reversed a year later. He was re-tried on the capital charges of espionage and working with outlawed parties. In September 2016, he was released, after almost 10 years in prison. After spending ten years in prison, he is now living in France.

The sentence to death on moharebeh charge in the summer of 2007 and later to 31 years in prison by the Appeals Court, has been reduced again to 15 years imprisonment.

In April 2007, after being held for four months in detention, without access to a lawyer, Hassanpour was charged by Revolutionary Court prosecutors with "espionage", "acting against national security", and "active armed resistance against the state", which is punishable by death under Iran's Islamic Penal Code. The Supreme Court of Iran confirmed his death sentence on July 17, 2007, but it was reversed by the Head of the Judiciary on 3 September 2008 who sent it back to the Islamic Revolutionary Court of Sanandaj for review. According to his lawyer, Sirvan Houshmand, "the legal case against Hassanpour rests purely on evidence from interrogation reports obtained during his detention," lacking any other corroborating evidence, and interrogators in Iranian prisons, (according to human rights groups), "routinely subject detainees to physical and psychological ill-treatment to obtain coerced confessions."

== Early life ==
Adnan Hassanpour was born to a Kurdish family in Mariwan, Iranian Kurdistan. He has one sister, Leili Hassanpour. Hassanpour is the cousin of Abdolvahed "Hiwa" Botimar, a journalist and environmental activist who was also tried in secret and accused of being an "enemy of God".

== Political views ==
Iran follows the Sharia Law, which the governing officials in most Islamic Republics interpret as the inequality of rights between genders, religions, sexual orientation, as well as any other practices that go against Islam. Hassanpour disagrees with this and was an advocate of cultural rights for Iranian Kurds.

== Career ==
Before he was arrested, Hassanpour worked for several publications where he emerged as a great defender of the right to expression. He was managing director of the Marivan Literary Association from 2001 to 2004 and edited the association's literacy magazine, Rawat. He also worked with foreign media such as Voice of America and Radio Farda, which broadcasts in Persian to Iran. Among the many publications he worked with, Aso was the most infamous. Hassanpour is the former editor of the journal, which was banned in Iran in August 2005. This publication was critical of the establishment and how it violated the cultural rights of citizens.

== 2005 arrest ==
In 2005, Hassanpour was summoned to shed light on the way the magazine covered protests in Iran. These summonses led to his subsequent trial and sentencing, as well as the demise of Aso. He was unexpectedly arrested on January 25, 2007, two weeks before his scheduled trial. In April 2007, after being held for four months in detention, without access to a lawyer, Hassanpour was charged by Revolutionary Court prosecutors with "espionage", "acting against national security", and "active armed resistance against the state" (moharebeh), which is punishable by death under Iran's penal code. The revolutionary court in the city of Marivan condemned Hassanpour to execution solely based on interrogation reports produced by the Ministry of Intelligence. He was sentenced to death after he was convicted of spying and being a threat to national security.

== Deprivation of legal right to furlough ==
Adnan Hassanpour has spent 7 years in prison, making him the longest-standing prisoner among journalists. He was serving his sentence behind bars in Sanandaj prison, deprived of his legal right to furlough, without a single hour of release during these years.

Reporters Without Borders and Amnesty International have spoken out on behalf of Hassanpour.

== Legacy ==
Adnan Hassanpour, a journalist and advocate of cultural rights for Iranian Kurds, is a member of the Kurdish Writer's Association. Hassanpour is the winner of the 2007 Reporters without Borders' Press Freedom Award and the 2007 Press Freedom prize from Italy. He was known as author for writing on the subject of Kurdish discrimination in Iran.
