= Dalgan District =

Former district in Sistan and Baluchestan province, Iran

Dalgan District Persian: بخش دَلگان
- Former District
- Location within Iran
- Coordinates: 27°25′21″N 59°31′11″E
- Country: Iran
- Province: Sistan and Baluchestan
- County: Iranshahr
- Capital: Galmurti

Population (2006)
  - Total: 52,419
- Time zone: UTC+3:30 (IRST)

Dalgan District (Persian: بخش دَلگان) is a former administrative division of Iranshahr County, Sistan and Baluchestan province, Iran. Its capital was the city of Galmurti.

== History ==
After the 2006 National Census, the district was separated from the county in the establishment of Dalgan County.

== Demographics ==
=== Population ===
At the time of the 2006 census, the district's population was 52,419 in 9,894 households.

=== Administrative divisions ===
Dalgan District Population
Administrative Divisions	2006
Dalgan RD	23,068
Hudian RD	3,708
Jolgeh-ye Chah Hashem RD	22,644
Galmurti (city)	2,999
Total	52,419
RD = Rural District
