= Hudian Rural District =

Rural district in Sistan and Baluchestan province, Iran

Hudian Rural District Persian: دهستان هوديان
- Rural District
- Location within Iran
- Coordinates: 27°50′53″N 59°19′03″E
- Province: Sistan and Baluchestan
- County: Dalgan
- District: Central
- Capital: Hudian

Population (2016)
  - Total: 3,206
- Time zone: UTC+3:30 (IRST)

Hudian Rural District (Persian: دهستان هوديان) is in the Central District of Dalgan County, Sistan and Baluchestan province, Iran. Its capital is the village of Hudian.

== Demographics ==
=== Population ===
At the time of the 2006 National Census, the rural district's population (as a part of the former Dalgan District of Iranshahr County) was 3,708 in 750 households. There were 3,193 inhabitants in 717 households at the following census of 2011, by which time the district had been separated from the county in the establishment of Dalgan County. The rural district was transferred to the new Central District. The 2016 census measured the population of the rural district as 3,206 in 834 households. The most populous of its 38 villages was Hudian, with 383 people.
