= Dalgan Rural District =

Rural district in Sistan and Baluchestan province, Iran

Dalgan Rural District Persian: دهستان دلگان
- Rural District
- Location within Iran
- Coordinates: 27°25′35″N 59°40′24″E
- Country: Iran
- Province: Sistan and Baluchestan
- County: Dalgan
- District: Central
- Capital: Galmurti

Population (2016)
  - Total: 20,991
- Time zone: UTC+3:30 (IRST)

Dalgan Rural District (Persian: دهستان دلگان) is in the Central District of Dalgan County, Sistan and Baluchestan province, Iran. It is administered from the city of Galmurti.

== Demographics ==
=== Population ===
At the time of the 2006 National Census, the rural district's population (as a part of the former Dalgan District of Iranshahr County) was 23,068 in 4,263 households. There were 19,609 inhabitants in 4,310 households at the following census of 2011, by which time the district had been separated from the county in the establishment of Dalgan County. The rural district was transferred to the new Central District. The 2016 census measured the population of the rural district as 20,991 in 5,363 households. The most populous of its 288 villages was Chah-e Khoda Bakhsh, with 2,043 people.
