= Jolgeh-ye Chah Hashem District =

District in Sistan and Baluchestan province, Iran

Jolgeh-ye Chah Hashem District Persian: بخش جلگه چاه هاشم
- District
- Location within Iran
- Coordinates: 27°08′47″N 59°25′16″E
- Country: Iran
- Province: Sistan and Baluchestan
- County: Dalgan
- Capital: Chegerdak

Population (2016)
  - Total: 25,495
- Time zone: UTC+3:30 (IRST)

Jolgeh-ye Chah Hashem District (Persian: بخش جلگه چاه هاشم) is in Dalgan County, Sistan and Baluchestan province, Iran. Its capital is the city of Chegerdak.

== History ==
After the 2006 National Census, Dalgan District was separated from Iranshahr County in the establishment of Dalgan County, which was divided into two districts and five rural districts, with Galmurti as its capital and only city at the time.

After the 2016 census, the village of Chegerdak was elevated to the status of a city, and Azarabad Rural District was created in the district.

== Demographics ==
=== Population ===
At the time of the 2011 census, the district's population was 24,072 people in 5,249 households. The 2016 census counted 25,495 inhabitants in 6,083 households in the district.

=== Administrative divisions ===
Jolgeh-ye Chah Hashem District Population
Administrative Divisions	2011	2016
Azarabad RD (Note: Established after the 2016 census)		
Chah-e Ali RD	4,620	4,748
Jolgeh-ye Chah Hashem RD	19,452	20,747
Chegerdak (city) (Note: Became a city after the 2016 census)		
Total	24,072	25,495
RD = Rural District
