= Jolgeh-ye Chah Hashem Rural District =

Rural district in Sistan and Baluchestan province, Iran

Jolgeh-ye Chah Hashem Rural District Persian: دهستان جلگه چاه هاشم
- Rural District
- Location within Iran
- Coordinates: 27°05′17″N 59°06′53″E
- Country: Iran
- Province: Sistan and Baluchestan
- County: Dalgan
- District: Jolgeh-ye Chah Hashem
- Capital: Chegerdak

Population (2016)
  - Total: 20,747
- Time zone: UTC+3:30 (IRST)

Jolgeh-ye Chah Hashem Rural District (Persian: دهستان جلگه چاه هاشم) is in Jolgeh-ye Chah Hashem District of Dalgan County, Sistan and Baluchestan province, Iran. It is administered from the city of Chegerdak.

== Demographics ==
=== Population ===
At the time of the 2006 National Census, the rural district's population (as a part of the former Dalgan District of Iranshahr County) was 22,644 in 4,253 households. There were 19,452 inhabitants in 4,255 households at the following census of 2011, by which time the district had been separated from the county in the establishment of Dalgan County. The rural district was transferred to the new Jolgeh-ye Chah Hashem District. The 2016 census measured the population of the rural district as 20,747 in 4,928 households. The most populous of its 361 villages was Chegerdak (now a city), with 2,742 people.
