= Central District (Dalgan County) =

District in Sistan and Baluchestan province, Iran

Central District (Dalgan County) Persian: بخش مرکزی شهرستان دَلگان
- District
- Location within Iran
- Coordinates: 27°41′05″N 59°25′53″E
- Country: Iran
- Province: Sistan and Baluchestan
- County: Dalgan
- Capital: Galmurti

Population (2016)
  - Total: 42,362
- Time zone: UTC+3:30 (IRST)

The Central District of Dalgan County (Persian: بخش مرکزی شهرستان دَلگان) is in Sistan and Baluchestan province, Iran. Its capital is the city of Galmurti.

== History ==
After the 2006 National Census, Dalgan District was separated from Iranshahr County in the establishment of Dalgan County, which was divided into two districts and five rural districts, with Galmurti as its capital and only city at the time.

== Demographics ==
=== Population ===
At the time of the 2011 census, the district's population was 38,741 people in 8,347 households. The 2016 census measured the population of the district as 42,362 inhabitants in 10,468 households.

=== Administrative divisions ===
Central District (Dalgan County) Population
Administrative Divisions	2011	2016
Dalgan RD	19,609	20,991
Gonbad-e Alavi RD	7,629	7,873
Hudian RD	3,193	3,206
Galmurti (city)	8,310	10,292
Total	38,741	42,362
RD = Rural District
