= Dalgan County =

County in Sistan and Baluchestan province, Iran

Dalgan County Persian: شهرستان دَلگان
- County
- Location of Dalgan County in Sistan and Baluchestan province (left, purple)

- Location of Sistan and Baluchestan province in Iran
- Coordinates: 27°25′21″N 59°31′11″E
- Country: Iran
- Province: Sistan and Baluchestan
- Capital: Galmurti
- Districts: Central, Jolgeh-ye Chah Hashem

Population (2016)
  - Total: 67,857
- Time zone: UTC+3:30 (IRST)

Dalgan County (Persian: شهرستان دَلگان) is in Sistan and Baluchestan province, Iran. Its capital is the city of Galmurti.

== History ==
After the 2006 National Census, Dalgan District was separated from Iranshahr County in the establishment of Dalgan County, which was divided into two districts and five rural districts, with Galmurti as its capital and only city at the time.

After the 2016 census, the village of Chegerdak was elevated to the status of a city. In addition, Azarabad Rural District was created in Jolgeh-ye Chah Hashem District.

== Demographics ==
=== Population ===
At the time of the 2011 census, the county's population was 13,580 households. The 2016 census measured the population of the county as 67,857 in 16,551 households.

=== Administrative divisions ===
Dalgan County's population history and administrative structure over two consecutive censuses are shown in the following table.

Dalgan County Population
Administrative Divisions	2011	2016
Central District	38,741	42,362
Dalgan RD	19,609	20,991
Gonbad-e Alavi RD	7,629	7,873
Hudian RD	3,193	3,206
Galmurti (city)	8,310	10,292
Jolgeh-ye Chah Hashem District	24,072	25,495
Azarabad RD (Note: Established after the 2016 census)		
Chah-e Ali RD	4,620	4,748
Jolgeh-ye Chah Hashem RD	19,452	20,747
Chegerdak (city) (Note: Became a city after the 2016 census)		
Total	62,813	67,857
RD = Rural District

== See also ==
Media related to Dalgan County at Wikimedia Commons
