= Hezbollah =

Islamist movement and militant group based in Lebanon

Islamic Resistance in Lebanon المقاومة الإسلامية في لبنان Al-Muqāwamah al-Islāmīyah fī Lubnān
- Secretary-General and Leader: Naim Qassem
- Supreme Leader: Mojtaba Khamenei
- Deputy Secretary-General: Mohammad Raad
- Head of the Executive Council: Ali Damoush
- Founder: Subhi al-Tufayli; Abbas al-Musawi X Hassan Nasrallah X
- Founded: 1982; 44 years ago (initially); 16 February 1985; 41 years ago (officially)
- Headquarters: Beirut
- Parliamentary group: Loyalty to the Resistance Bloc
- Paramilitary wing: Jihad Council; Lebanese Resistance Brigades
- Ideology: Islamic nationalism; Khomeinism; Shia Islamism; Jihadism (Shia); Anti-imperialism; Anti-Zionism; Pan-Islamism; Populism; see more...
- Religion: Shia Islam (Twelver)
- National affiliation: March 8 Alliance
- International affiliation: Axis of Resistance (informal)
- Colours: Yellow and green
- Slogan: فَإِنَّ حِزْبَ ٱللَّهِ هُمُ ٱلْغَالِبُونَ ('Surely it is God's party that will prevail.')^{[Quran 5:56]}
- Designated as terror group by: See list: Argentina; Australia; Austria; Bahrain; Canada; Colombia; Costa Rica; Czech Republic; Dominican Republic; Ecuador; Estonia; European Union; France; Germany; Gulf Cooperation Council; Guatemala; Honduras; Israel; Kosovo; Lithuania; Netherlands; New Zealand; Paraguay; Serbia; Slovenia; Syria; Trinidad and Tobago; United Arab Emirates; United Kingdom; United States
- Parliament: 15 / 128 (12%)

Party flag

Website
- moqawama.org.lb

Hezbollah
- Dates active: 1982–present
- Allegiance: Iran (IRGC)
- Headquarters: Beirut, Lebanon
- Size: 60,000 - 65,000 (2023)

Hezbollah (Note: /ˌhɛzbəˈlɑː/ HEZ-bə-LAH; Arabic: حزب الله, romanized: Ḥizbu 'llāh, pronounced [ħizbuˈɫːaːh], lit. 'Party of God' Other transliterations include Hizbullah, Hizballah, Hizbollah, Hezbolla, Hezballah, Hisbollah, Hizbu'llah and Hizb Allah.) is a Lebanese Shia Islamist political party with an active paramilitary wing. Its military and security activities have been prohibited by the Lebanese government since March 2026, amid the 2026 Lebanon war. Hezbollah's paramilitary wing is the Jihad Council, and its political wing is the Loyalty to the Resistance Bloc party in the Lebanese Parliament. Its armed strength was assessed to be equivalent to that of a medium-sized army in 2016.

Hezbollah was founded in 1982 by Lebanese Shiite clerics in close cooperation with Iran. It emerged in the context of the Lebanese civil war, the collapse of central authority, Iran's strategic interests in Lebanon, and the Israeli invasion of Lebanon. The movement's formation was shaped by the Iranian Revolution of 1979 and Ayatollah Ruhollah Khomeini's model of Islamic governance. Hezbollah subsequently established strong ties with Iran as part of the "Axis of Resistance". The group was initially supported by 1,500 Islamic Revolutionary Guard Corps (IRGC) instructors, who helped unify various Lebanese Shia factions under Hezbollah's leadership. Hezbollah's 1985 manifesto outlined its key objectives, which include expelling Western influence from the region, destroying Israel, pledging allegiance to Iran's supreme leader, and establishing an Islamic government influenced by Iran's political ideology. However, the manifesto also emphasised Lebanese self-determination. Throughout the 1980s and 1990s, Hezbollah fought against Israeli forces and the South Lebanon Army (SLA), eventually leading to Israel's withdrawal from southern Lebanon in 2000. Hezbollah also played a prominent role in the 2006 Lebanon War and later became involved in the Syrian civil war, where it fought alongside the government of Bashar al-Assad against the ultimately victorious Syrian opposition forces.

In 2009, Hezbollah issued a new manifesto to oppose political sectarianism, broaden its appeal to non-Islamic movements, and promote a national unity government. The updated manifesto retained the same basic approach to foreign policy, emphasising what it characterizes as 'hegemonic strategies' of the U.S. and portraying Israel as its forward base for dominating the region.

Since the 1990s, Hezbollah has grown into a significant political force in Lebanon. The group operates a vast social services network, including schools and hospitals, and runs a satellite TV station, Al-Manar. Politically, Hezbollah's Loyalty to the Resistance Bloc holds 15 seats in the Lebanese Parliament, making it a powerful player in Lebanon's government. However, the group's influence has led to growing domestic criticism. Following the 2020 Beirut port explosion, Hezbollah was accused of obstructing efforts to hold those responsible accountable, contributing to a decline in public trust. A 2024 Arab Barometer survey found that 55% of Lebanese have "no trust at all" in Hezbollah, although it remains popular among the Shia population.

Despite calls for disarmament under United Nations Security Council resolutions, Hezbollah has expanded its military capabilities. In 2013, its armed wing is considered stronger than the Lebanese Armed Forces, making it one of the most powerful non-state actors in the world. Hezbollah leader Hassan Nasrallah declared in 2021 that the group had 100,000 fighters. Hezbollah has been involved in several high-profile attacks; it is believed to be responsible for the bombing of the US embassy and the US and French barracks bombings in Beirut in 1983, the assassination of Rafic Hariri in 2005, as well as later attacks, including bombings and hijackings. While Hezbollah has been regarded as a resistance movement by some scholars, the entire organisation, or its military wing alone, has been designated as a terrorist group by at least 28 countries as of April 2026, including most Western countries.

Since October 2023, Hezbollah has been at war with Israel. During this war, Nasrallah was assassinated after 32 years of leading the group, along with other key members of Hezbollah leadership. The conflict has led to the 2024 Lebanon War, which saw Southern Lebanon invaded by Israel, followed by a ceasefire. On 7 August 2025, in a government meeting specifically addressing the disarmament of Hezbollah, the majority of the government voted to approve the decision. The Lebanese Army was tasked to create a plan ensuring that only the state has control over weapons in Lebanon. The decision is based on a US plan to disarm Hezbollah. On 5 September, the Lebanese cabinet approved the Homeland Shield Plan, the LAF's roadmap for the disarmament of all militias in Lebanon and specifically Hezbollah. On 2 March 2026, Lebanese Prime Minister Nawaf Salam stated that the organisation's military actions range outside of Lebanese law.

== History ==
In 1982, Hezbollah was conceived by Lebanese clerics and funded by Iran primarily to fight the Israeli invasion of Lebanon. The 1982 and the 1978 Israeli invasions had created a humanitarian crisis in Lebanon; many villages in the south had been destroyed and large numbers of Shias had been displaced from their homes. In addition, the Shia had long been underrepresented in Lebanese politics. Both these factors fostered resentment among the local Shia population, making them a fertile ground for recruitment. Hezbollah was set up by local Shia committees under the leadership of Iran's first supreme leader, Ruhollah Khomeini. Hezbollah's forces were trained and organised by a contingent of 1,500 Iranian Revolutionary Guards (IRGC) that arrived from Iran with permission from the Syrian government occupying Lebanon's eastern highlands, which allowed the IRGC's transit to a base in the Beqaa Valley.

Scholars differ as to when Hezbollah came to be a distinct entity. Various sources list the official formation of the group as early as 1982, whereas Diaz and Newman maintain that Hezbollah remained an amalgamation of various violent Shia extremists until as late as 1985. Another version states that it was formed by supporters of Sheikh Ragheb Harb, a leader of the southern Shia resistance killed by Israel in 1984. Regardless of when the name came into official use, a number of Shia groups were slowly assimilated into the organisation, such as Islamic Jihad, Organisation of the Oppressed on Earth and the Revolutionary Justice Organisation. These designations are considered to be synonymous with Hezbollah by the US, Israel, and Canada.

According to Robert Fisk and Israeli General Shimon Shapira, the date of 8 June 1982, two days after the Israeli invasion of Lebanon, when 50 Shiite militants ambushed an Israel Defence Forces armoured convoy in Khalde south of Beirut, is considered by Hezbollah as the founding myth of their military wing. It was in this battle, delaying the Israeli advance to Beirut for six days, that the future Hezbollah military chief Mustafa Badreddine made his name as a serious commander. According to Shapira, the lightly armed Shia fighters managed to capture an Israeli armoured vehicle on that day and paraded it in the Revolutionary Guards' forward operating base in Baalbek, Eastern Lebanon. Fisk writes:

Down at Khalde, a remarkable phenomenon had taken shape. The Shia militiamen were running on foot into the Israeli gunfire to launch grenades at the Israeli armour, actually moving to within 20 feet of the tanks to open fire at them. Some of the Shia fighters had torn off pieces of their shirts and wrapped them around their heads as bands of martyrdom as the Iranian revolutionary guards had begun doing a year before when they staged their first mass attacks against the Iraqis in the Gulf War a thousand miles to the east. When they set fire to one Israeli armoured vehicle, the gunmen were emboldened to advance further. None of us, I think, realised the critical importance of the events of Khalde that night. The Lebanese Shia were learning the principles of martyrdom and putting them into practice. Never before had we seen these men wear headbands like this; we thought it was another militia affectation but it was not. It was the beginning of a legend which also contained a strong element of truth. The Shia were now the Lebanese resistance, nationalist no doubt but also inspired by their religion. The party of God – in Arabic, the Hezbollah – were on the beaches of Khalde that night.

=== 1980s ===
Hezbollah emerged in South Lebanon during a consolidation of Shia militias as a rival to the older Amal Movement. Hezbollah played a significant role in the Lebanese civil war, opposing US forces in 1982–83 and opposing Amal and Syria during the 1985–88 War of the Camps. However, Hezbollah's early primary focus was ending Israel's occupation of southern Lebanon following Israel's 1982 invasion and siege of Beirut. Amal, the main Lebanese Shia political group, initiated guerrilla warfare. In 2006, former Israeli prime minister Ehud Barak stated, "When we entered Lebanon ... there was no Hezbollah. We were accepted with perfumed rice and flowers by the Shia in the south. It was our presence there that created Hezbollah."

Hezbollah waged an asymmetric war using suicide attacks against the Israel Defence Forces (IDF) and Israeli targets outside of Lebanon. Hezbollah is reputed to have been among the first Islamic resistance groups in the Middle East to use the tactics of suicide bombing, assassination, and capturing foreign soldiers, as well as murders and hijackings. Hezbollah also employed more conventional military tactics and weaponry, notably Katyusha rockets and other missiles. At the end of the Lebanese Civil War in 1990, despite the Taif Agreement asking for the "disbanding of all Lebanese and non-Lebanese militias", Syria, which controlled Lebanon at that time, allowed Hezbollah to maintain their arsenal and control Shia areas along the border with Israel.

=== After 1990 ===
In the 1990s, Hezbollah transformed from a revolutionary group into a political one, in a process which has been described as the "Lebanonisation" of Hezbollah. Unlike its uncompromising revolutionary stance in the 1980s, Hezbollah conveyed a lenient stance towards the Lebanese state.

In 1992, Hezbollah decided to participate in elections, and Ali Khamenei, supreme leader of Iran, endorsed it. Former Hezbollah secretary general, Subhi al-Tufayli, contested this decision, which led to a schism in Hezbollah. Hezbollah won all twelve seats which were on its electoral list. At the end of that year, Hezbollah began to engage in dialogue with Lebanese Christians. Hezbollah regards cultural, political, and religious freedoms in Lebanon as sanctified, although it does not extend these values to groups who have relations with Israel.

In 1997, Hezbollah formed the multi-confessional Lebanese Brigades to Fight the Israeli Occupation in an attempt to revive national and secular resistance against Israel, thereby marking the "Lebanonisation" of resistance.

=== Islamic Jihad Organisation (IJO) ===
Whether the Islamic Jihad Organisation (IJO) was a nom de guerre used by Hezbollah or a separate organisation, is disputed. According to certain sources, IJO was identified as merely a "telephone organisation", and whose name was "used by those involved to disguise their true identity". Hezbollah reportedly also used another name, "Islamic Resistance" (al-Muqawama al-Islamiyya), for attacks against Israel.

A 2003 US court decision found IJO was the name used by Hezbollah for its attacks in Lebanon, parts of the Middle East, and Europe. The US, Israel, and Canada consider the names "Islamic Jihad Organisation", "Organisation of the Oppressed on Earth" and the "Revolutionary Justice Organisation" to be synonymous with Hezbollah.

=== Axis of Resistance ===
The group receives substantial financial and military backing from Iran, by smuggling and other measures, positioning itself as the leading member of the "Axis of Resistance", an alliance in opposition to Israel and Western influence in the Middle East. In mid-September 2024, Israel detonated thousands of communication devices distributed to Hezbollah operatives, including pagers and walkie-talkies, which exploded simultaneously across Lebanon. The attacks exposed deep vulnerabilities in Hezbollah networks. Following the outcome of the 2024 Lebanon War, the 2024 Syrian opposition offensives, the downfall of the Assad regime and the weakening of the Axis of Resistance, Hezbollah has withdrawn the majority of its military infrastructure from southern Lebanon, transferring control to the Lebanese army. This move aligns with the November 2024 U.S.-brokered ceasefire agreement, which mandates Hezbollah's repositioning north of the Litani River and the deployment of approximately 5,000 Lebanese troops to the south. The withdrawal aims to reduce tensions along the Israel-Lebanon border and facilitate the return of displaced civilians. While Hezbollah has removed heavy weaponry, some fighters from southern villages remain with light arms. The situation remains delicate, with ongoing monitoring by international observers to ensure compliance with the ceasefire terms.

=== Disarmament ===
As part of the ceasefire agreement that ended the 2024 Israeli invasion of Lebanon, and with mounting pressure from the US, the Lebanese Armed Forces have undertaken efforts to disarm Hezbollah, including in its traditional strongholds in southern Lebanon, with the aid of Israeli intelligence. In May 2025, the Lebanese government had announced that the army had largely achieved its aim. On 5 August 2025, the Lebanese government declared that a plan would be scheduled for the disarmament of the militias after a six-hour cabinet meeting with president Joseph Aoun. According to the Lebanese government, Hezbollah has handed over control of several critical facilities. Information minister Paul Morcos stated that a deadline of the end of 2025 was set for disarmament.

Hezbollah leader Naim Qassem condemned the disarmament proposal, stating: "The resistance is fine, strong and ready to fight for Lebanon's sovereignty and independence... Hezbollah made heavy sacrifices to defend Lebanon against the Israeli aggression." He warned that Hezbollah was prepared to renew attacks on Israel and said all of Lebanon would unite to counter Israel. On 22 August, Qassem threatened a civil war if the disarmament proposal went forward, which prime minister Nawaf Salam condemned as "completely unacceptable".

On 7 August, the cabinet of ministers approved the objective of the disarmament proposal, ensuring that arms in Lebanon are only possessed by the state. Hezbollah and Amal Movement-affiliated ministers walked out of the cabinet meeting in protest, and thousands of Hezbollah supporters rallied against the approval in the southern suburbs of Beirut. On 5 September, the Lebanese army presented the disarmament plan to the government. On 5 September 2025, General Rodolphe Haykal presented to the Lebanese cabinet the Homeland Shield Plan, its roadmap for the disarmament of all militias in Lebanon, specifically Hezbollah.

=== 2026 ===
On 2 March 2026, Lebanese Prime Minister Nawaf Salam condemned Hezbollah's rocket and drone strikes from southern Lebanon, calling them irresponsible acts outside the authority of the Lebanese state that endanger national security. While he emphasised that all military action must fall under the government's control, he has not formally declared Hezbollah outlawed, focusing instead on preventing unauthorised armed operations.

== Ideology ==
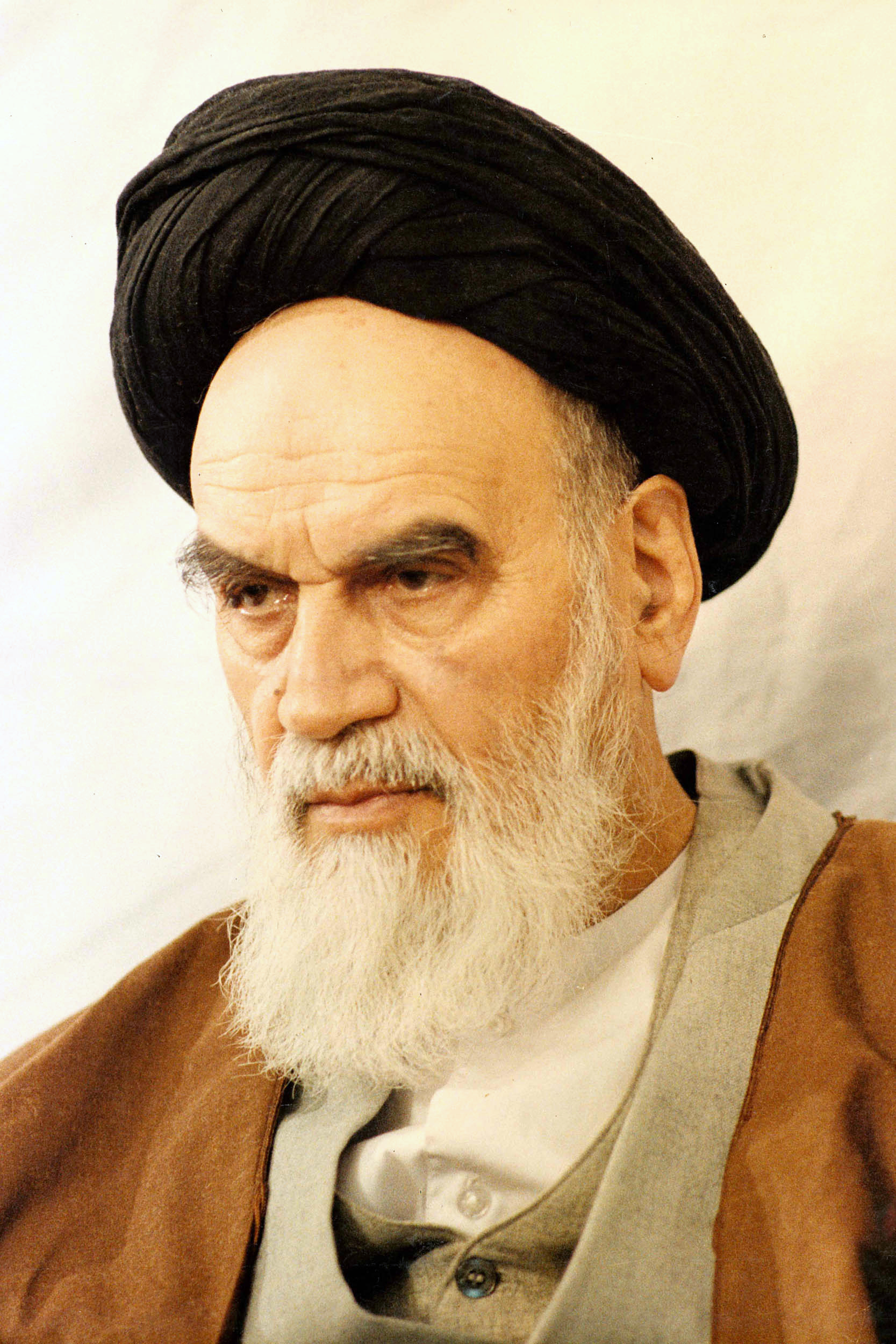
Ayatollah Ruhollah Khomeini

The ideology of Hezbollah has been summarised as Shia Islamist radicalism; Hezbollah follows the Islamic Shia theology developed by Iranian leader Ayatollah Ruhollah Khomeini. Hezbollah was largely formed with the aid of the Khomeini's followers in the early 1980s in order to spread Islamic revolution and follows a distinct version of Islamic Shia ideology (Wilayat al-faqih or Guardianship of the Islamic Jurists) developed by Khomeini, who was the leader of the "Islamic Revolution" in Iran. Although Hezbollah originally aimed to transform Lebanon into an Islamic republic, this goal has been abandoned in favour of a more inclusive approach.

Early on, Hezbollah was influenced by ideas from prominent Sunni Islamists. Hezbollah's own rhetoric was Islamist in general, rather than Shia in particular. Hezbollah's position on the Sunni-Shia divide was that instead of dwelling on theological differences, Sunnis and Shias ought to cooperate with one another to oppose the Israeli occupation of Arab lands. To maintain a sense of Muslim unity, Hezbollah avoided direct criticism of Saudi Arabia; even during the 2007 Lebanon's conflict with the Salafis, Al-Manar TV's employees had instructions "not to talk badly about Saudi Arabia". This changed, however, after the beginning of the Saudi-led intervention in the Yemeni civil war.

Hezbollah has been described as socially conservative. It is against homosexuality and LGBT rights. In 2023, Hezbollah leader Hassan Nasrallah called for gay people to be killed and said that the LGBT community was a "threat to society". The organisation also encourages women to wear traditional Islamic veils, especially the full-body chador.

Some scholars consider Hezbollah to have become a left-wing political movement; including political scientists Anisseh van Engeland and Rachael Rudolph, Imad Salamey, Amal Saad-Ghorayeb, and As'ad Abu Khalil. Salamey described Hezbollah as "a revolutionary proletarian party with an Islamic manifesto". Feminist Judith Butler controversially called Hezbollah part of the "global left" because they define themselves as anti-imperialist. Communist writer Nahla Chahal wrote that Hezhollah "is a movement of the Theology of Liberation".

=== 1985 manifesto ===
On 16 February 1985, Sheik Ibrahim al-Amin issued Hezbollah's manifesto. The ideology presented in it was described as radical. Its first objective was to fight against what Hezbollah described as US and Israeli imperialism, including the Israeli occupation of Southern Lebanon and other territories. The second objective was to gather all Muslims into an "ummah", under which Lebanon would further the aims of the 1979 Revolution of Iran. It also declared it would protect all Lebanese communities, excluding those that collaborated with Israel, and support all national movements—both Muslim and non-Muslim—throughout the world. The manifesto by Hezbollah rejects the existence of the state of Israel, calling for its destruction.

Translated excerpts from Hezbollah's original 1985 manifesto read:

We are the sons of the umma (Muslim community) ... ... We are an ummah linked to the Muslims of the whole world by the solid doctrinal and religious connection of Islam, whose message God wanted to be fulfilled by the Seal of the Prophets, i.e., Prophet Muhammad. ... As for our culture, it is based on the Holy Quran, the Sunna and the legal rulings of the faqih who is our source of imitation ...

=== 2009 manifesto ===
On 30 November 2009, secretary-general Hassan Nasrallah presented a new manifesto at Hezbollah's 7th political conference. Besides its introduction, this 32-page document has three chapters on U.S. hegemonic strategies and the impact of globalization; Hezbollah's approach to Lebanon; and Palestinian resistance to Israel. While self-described as a "rebirth" document, the manifesto conveys the same basic approach to foreign policy as in the past, according to scholar Benedetta Berti, though it is more "politically savvy" and appeals to non-Islamic movements. Still, the manifesto offers new support for Lebanese political institutions, through which it had been making inroads. Notably, it says that it opposes political "sectarianism", idealises a national unity government, and treats the Lebanese army less as an enemy and more as a subordinate military arm.

=== Attitudes, statements, and actions concerning Israel and Zionism ===
From the inception of Hezbollah to the present, the elimination of the State of Israel has been one of Hezbollah's primary goals. Some translations of Hezbollah's 1985 Arabic-language manifesto state that "our struggle will end only when this entity [Israel] is obliterated". According to Hezbollah's Deputy-General, Naim Qassem, the struggle against Israel is a core belief of Hezbollah and the central rationale of Hezbollah's existence.

Hezbollah says that its continued hostilities against Israel are justified as reciprocal to Israeli operations against Lebanon and as retaliation for what they claim is Israel's occupation of Lebanese territory. Israel withdrew from Lebanon in 2000, and their withdrawal was verified by the United Nations as being in accordance with resolution 425 of 19 March 1978; however, Lebanon considers the Shebaa farms—a 26 km^{2} (10 sq mi) piece of land captured by Israel from Syria in the 1967 war and considered by the UN to be Syrian territory occupied by Israel—to be Lebanese territory. Finally, Hezbollah considers Israel to be an illegitimate state. For these reasons, it justifies its actions as acts of defensive jihad.

If they go from Shebaa, we won't stop fighting them. ... Our goal is to liberate the 1948 borders of Palestine, ... The Jews who survive this war of liberation can go back to Germany or wherever they came from. However, that the Jews who lived in Palestine before 1948 will be 'allowed to live as a minority and they will be cared for by the Muslim majority.'

— Hezbollah's spokesperson Hassan Ezzedin, about an Israeli withdrawal from Shebaa Farms

=== Attitudes and actions concerning Jews and Judaism ===
Hezbollah officials have said, on rare occasions, that it is only "anti-Zionist" and not antisemitic. However, according to scholars, "these words do not hold up upon closer examination". Among other actions, Hezbollah actively engages in Holocaust denial and spreads antisemitic conspiracy theories. Muhammad Hussein Fadlallah, a prominent Lebanese Shia cleric and an influential ideological figure associated with Hezbollah, made a number of statements expressing hostility toward Jews as a group.

Various antisemitic statements have been attributed to Hezbollah officials. Amal Saad-Ghorayeb, a Lebanese political analyst, argues that although Zionism has influenced Hezbollah's anti-Judaism, "it is not contingent upon it because Hezbollah's hatred of Jews is more religiously motivated than politically motivated". Robert S. Wistrich, a historian specialising in the study of antisemitism, described Hezbollah's ideology concerning Jews:

The anti-Semitism of Hezbollah leaders and spokesmen combines the image of seemingly invincible Jewish power ... and cunning with the contempt normally reserved for weak and cowardly enemies. Like the Hamas propaganda for holy war, that of Hezbollah has relied on the endless vilification of Jews as 'enemies of mankind,' 'conspiratorial, obstinate, and conceited' adversaries full of 'satanic plans' to enslave the Arabs. It fuses traditional Islamic anti-Judaism with Western conspiracy myths, Third Worldist anti-Zionism, and Iranian Shiite contempt for Jews as 'ritually impure' and corrupt infidels. Sheikh Fadlallah typically insists ... that Jews wish to undermine or obliterate Islam and Arab cultural identity in order to advance their economic and political domination.

Conflicting reports say Al-Manar, the Hezbollah-owned and operated television station, accused either Israel or Jews of deliberately spreading HIV and other diseases to Arabs throughout the Middle East. Al-Manar was criticised in the West for airing "anti-Semitic propaganda" in the form of a television drama depicting a Jewish world domination conspiracy theory. The group has been accused by US analysts of engaging in Holocaust denial. In addition, during its 2006 war, it apologised only for killing Israel's Arabs (i.e., non-Jews).

In November 2009, according to the Jewish Telegraphic Agency, Hezbollah pressured a private English-language school in western Beirut "which asked not to be identified", to eliminate from its curriculum excerpts from The Diary of Anne Frank, a book of the writings from the diary kept by the Jewish child Anne Frank whilst she was in hiding with her family during the Nazi occupation of the Netherlands. This was after Hezbollah's member of Lebanese parliament Hussein Hajj Hassan, interviewed on the organisation's Al-Manar television channel, criticised the school for "showing poor judgment in picking out its textbooks", and asked how long Lebanon would "remain an open arena for the Zionist invasion of education".

In The New Yorker's 22 July 2024 issue, Dexter Filkins, in his report on the border fight between Israel and the organisation, quoted a commander of Hezbollah, who had been active in its operations outside Lebanon, stating that the war between the "Zionist state" and the "party of God" would be "very simply" resolved, "when [the Jews] leave on the same boat they came on".

== Organisation ==
Organisational chart of Hezbollah, by Ahmad Nizar Hamzeh

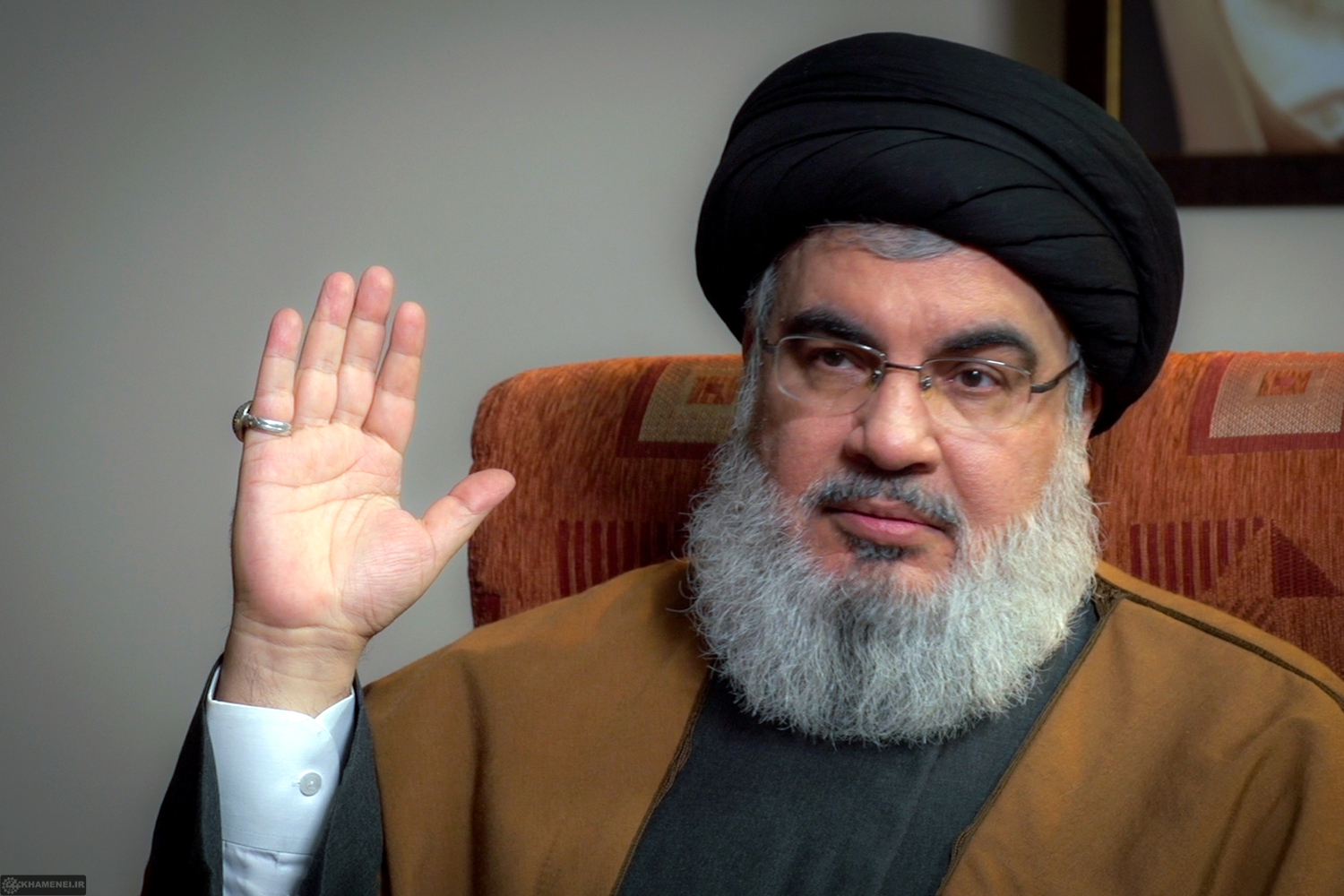
Hassan Nasrallah, the third Secretary General of Hezbollah

At the beginning, many Hezbollah leaders maintained that the movement was "not an organisation, for its members carry no cards and bear no specific responsibilities", and that the movement does not have "a clearly defined organisational structure". Today, as Hezbollah scholar Magnus Ranstorp reports, Hezbollah does actually have a formal governing structure and, in keeping with the principle of Guardianship of the Islamic Jurists (velayat-e faqih), it "concentrate[s] ... all authority and powers" on its religious leaders, whose decisions, then, "flow from the ulama down the entire community".

The supreme decision-making bodies of the Hezbollah were divided between the Majlis al-Shura (Consultative Assembly) which was headed by 12 senior clerical members with responsibility for tactical decisions and supervision of overall Hizballah activity throughout Lebanon, and the Majlis al-Shura al-Karar (the Deciding Assembly), headed by Sheikh Muhammad Hussein Fadlallah and composed of eleven other clerics with responsibility for all strategic matters. Within the Majlis al-Shura, there existed seven specialised committees dealing with ideological, financial, military and political, judicial, informational and social affairs. In turn, the Majlis al-Shura and these seven committees were replicated in each of Hizballah's three main operational areas (the Beqaa, Beirut, and the South).

Since the Supreme Leader of Iran is the ultimate clerical authority, Hezbollah's leaders have appealed to him "for guidance and directives in cases when Hezbollah's collective leadership [was] too divided over issues and fail[ed] to reach a consensus". After the death of Iran's first Supreme Leader, Khomeini, Hezbollah's governing bodies developed a more "independent role" and appealed to Iran less often. Since the Second Lebanon War, however, Iran has restructured Hezbollah to limit the power of Hassan Nasrallah, and invested a significant sum of money "rehabilitating" Hezbollah.

Structurally, Hezbollah does not distinguish between its political and social activities within Lebanon and its military/jihad activities against Israel. In 2009, Naim Qassem, Hezbollah's then-second in command, said that "Hezbollah has a single leadership ... All political, social and jihad work is tied to the decisions of this leadership ... The same leadership that directs the parliamentary and government work also leads jihad actions in the struggle against Israel."

In 2010, Iran's parliamentary speaker Ali Larijani said, "Iran takes pride in Lebanon's Islamic resistance movement for its steadfast Islamic stance. Hezbollah nurtures the original ideas of Islamic Jihad." He also instead charged the West with having accused Iran with support of terrorism and said, "The real terrorists are those who provide the Zionist regime with military equipment to bomb the people."

=== Funding ===
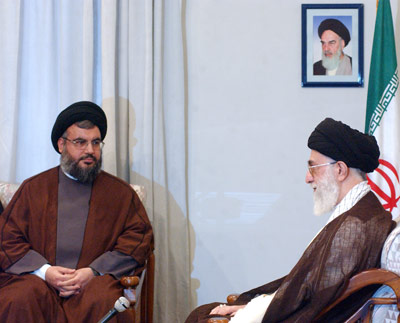
Nasrallah visiting Iranian Supreme Leader Ali Khamenei in Tehran, August 2005

Funding of Hezbollah comes from the Iranian government, Lebanese business groups, private persons, businessmen, the Lebanese diaspora involved in African diamond exploration, other Islamic groups and countries, taxes paid by the Shia Lebanese, and crime. Hezbollah says that the main source of its income comes from its own investment portfolios and donations by Muslims.

Western sources maintain that Hezbollah receives most of its financial, training, weapons, explosives, political, diplomatic, and organisational aid from Iran and Syria. Iran is said to have given $400 million between 1983 and 1989 through donations. Ostensibly on account of economic problems, Iran temporarily limited funds to humanitarian actions carried on by Hezbollah. During the late 1980s, when there was three-digit inflation in Lebanon due to the collapse of the Lira, the British periodical Middle East International reported that Hezbollah was receiving $3–5 million per month from Iran. According to reports subsequently released, Hezbollah received $400 million from Iran.

In 2009, when the United States GAO agency accused members of the Venezuelan government of "not cooperating fully in the war on drug trafficking" and claimed that "drug corruption had reached the ministerial level in Venezuela", Dorit Shavit, then in charge of Latin America & Caribbean affairs at the Israeli foreign ministry, stated in El Tiempo that the presence of "cells of Hezbollah guerrillas" had increased in recent years in the Guajira Peninsula and on the island of Margarita. The foreign ministry of Venezuela rejected these allegations as "absurd".

In 2011, Iran earmarked US$7 million to Hezbollah's activities in Latin America. Hezbollah has relied also on funding from the Shi'ite Lebanese Diaspora in West Africa, the United States and, most importantly, the Triple Frontier, or tri-border area, along the junction of Paraguay, Argentina, and Brazil. US law enforcement officials have identified an illegal multimillion-US dollar cigarette-smuggling fund raising operation, and a drug smuggling operation. Nasrallah has repeatedly denied any links between the South American drug trade and Hezbollah, calling such accusations "propaganda" and attempts "to damage the image of Hezbollah".

As of 2018, annual Iranian monetary support for Hezbollah was estimated at US$700 million by US officials.

Israel's efforts against Hezbollah have focused on its military assets as well as its finances, with an emphasis on the estimated US$700 million directed from Iran each year through intermediaries that accounted for most of Hezbollah's annual operating budget. Some of the earliest Israeli military efforts during the 2026 Lebanon war in March 2026 targeted the organization's supply of gold and foreign currency, as well as branches of the Al-Qard Al-Hasan Association, a non-profit financial institution that has been described as being "Hezbollah's bank in Lebanon". Money changing offices and gas stations were also struck, all as part of an effort to squeeze the organization's sources of funding. To bypass constraints set limiting the access of Al-Qard Al-Hasan to the formal banking network, the hawala system had been used to send US$1 billion in Iranian funds in 2025 via a network of broker transfers that passed through Iraq, Turkey and the United Arab Emirates, though sanctions have been placed on these brokers by the United States Department of the Treasury.

== Social services ==
Hezbollah organises and maintains an extensive social development program and runs hospitals, news services, educational facilities, and encouragement of Nikah mut'ah. One of its established institutions, Jihad Al Binna's Reconstruction Campaign, is responsible for numerous economic and infrastructure development projects in Lebanon. Hezbollah controls the Martyr's Institute (Al-Shahid Social Association), which pays stipends to "families of fighters who die" in battle. An IRIN news report of the UN Office for the Coordination of Humanitarian Affairs noted:

Hezbollah not only has armed and political wings—it also boasts an extensive social development program. Hezbollah currently operates at least four hospitals, twelve clinics, twelve schools and two agricultural centres that provide farmers with technical assistance and training. It also has an environmental department and an extensive social assistance program. Medical care is also cheaper than in most of the country's private hospitals and free for Hezbollah members.

According to CNN, "Hezbollah did everything that a government should do, from collecting the garbage to running hospitals and repairing schools." In July 2006, during the war with Israel, when there was no running water in Beirut, Hezbollah was arranging supplies around the city. Lebanese Shiites "see Hezbollah as a political movement and a social service provider as much as it is a militia". Hezbollah also rewards its guerrilla members who have been wounded in battle by taking them to Hezbollah-run amusement parks.

Hezbollah is, therefore, deeply embedded in Lebanese society.

== Political activities ==
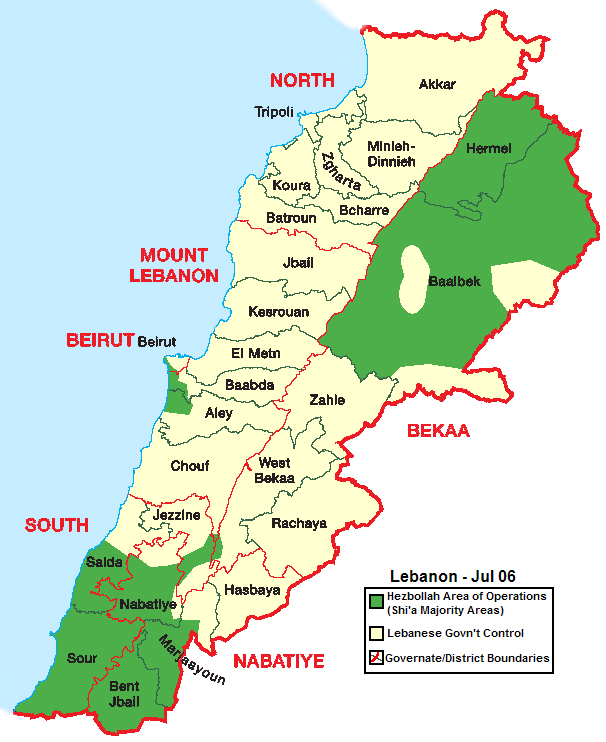
Hezbollah-controlled areas in July 2006 (most of Lebanon's majority Shi'a areas)

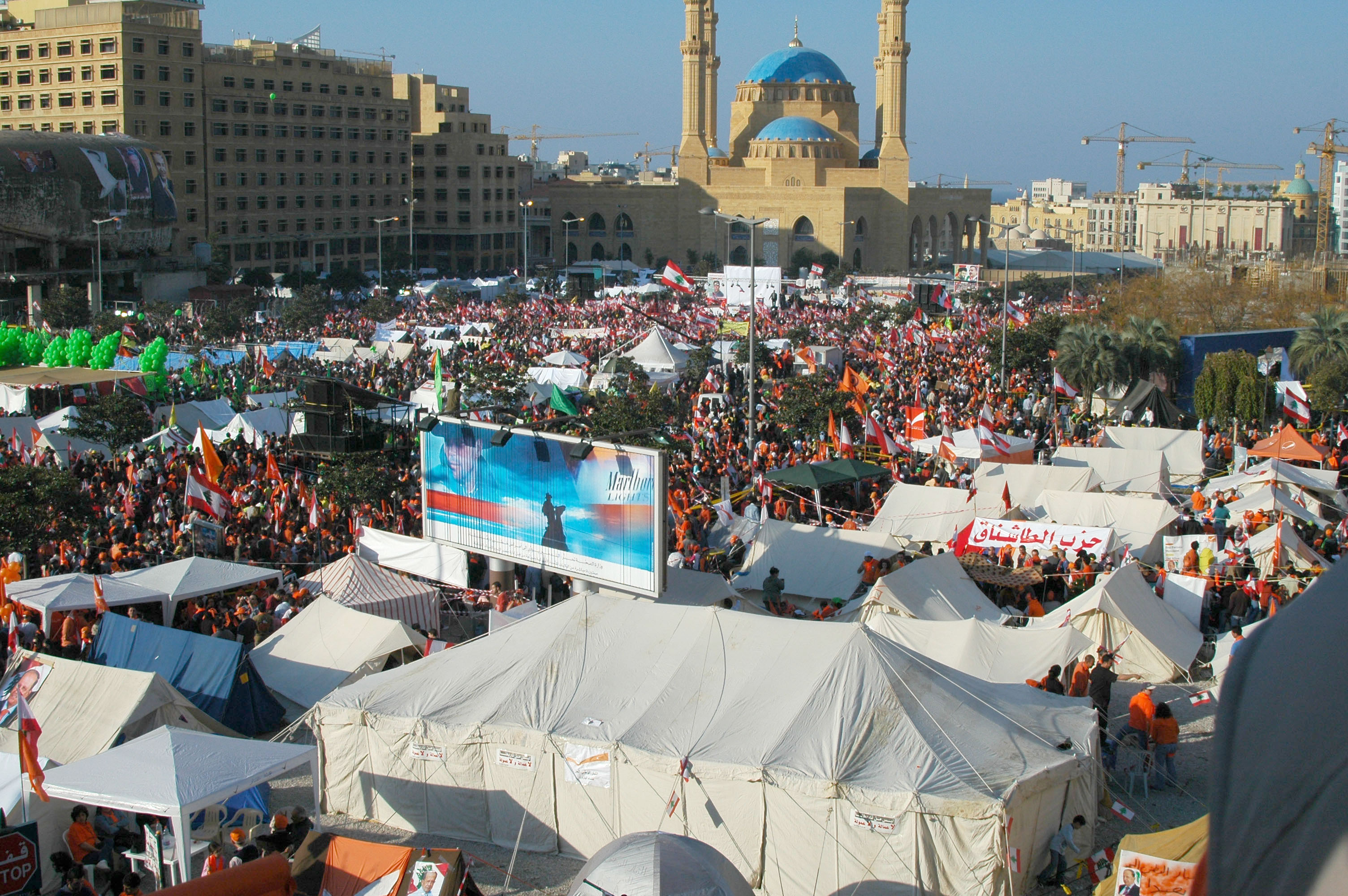
A December 2006 anti-government rally in Beirut

Hezbollah along with Amal is one of two major political parties in Lebanon that represent Shiite Muslims. Unlike Amal, whose support is predominantly in Lebanon's south, Hezbollah maintains broad-based support in all three areas of Lebanon with a majority Shia Muslim population: in the south, in Beirut and its surrounding area, and in the northern Beqaa Valley and Hermel region.

Hezbollah holds 14 of the 128 seats in the Parliament of Lebanon and is a member of the Resistance and Development Bloc. According to Daniel L. Byman, it is "the most powerful single political movement in Lebanon". Hezbollah, along with the Amal Movement, represents most of the Lebanese Shiite community. Unlike Amal, Hezbollah has not disarmed. Hezbollah participates in the Parliament of Lebanon.

=== Political alliances ===
Hezbollah has been one of the main parties of the March 8 Alliance since March 2005. Although Hezbollah had joined the new government in 2005, it remained staunchly opposed to the March 14 Alliance. On 1 December 2006, these groups began a series of political protests and sit-ins in opposition to the government of Prime Minister Fouad Siniora.

In 2006, Michel Aoun and Hassan Nasrallah met in Mar Mikhayel Church, Chiyah, and signed a memorandum of understanding between Free Patriotic Movement and Hezbollah organising their relation and discussing Hezbollah's disarmament with some conditions. The agreement also discussed the importance of having normal diplomatic relations with Syria and the request for information about the Lebanese political prisoners in Syria and the return of all political prisoners and diaspora in Israel. After this event, Aoun and his party became part of the March 8 Alliance.

On 7 May 2008, Lebanon's 17-month-long political crisis spiralled out of control. The fighting was sparked by a government move to shut down Hezbollah's telecommunication network and remove Beirut Airport's security chief over alleged ties to Hezbollah. Hezbollah leader Hassan Nasrallah said the government's decision to declare the group's military telecommunications network illegal was a "declaration of war" on the organisation, and demanded that the government revoke it.

Hezbollah-led opposition fighters seized control of several West Beirut neighbourhoods from Future Movement militiamen loyal to the backed government, in street battles that left 11 dead and 30 wounded. The opposition-seized areas were then handed over to the Lebanese Army. The army also pledged to resolve the dispute and has reversed the decisions of the government by letting Hezbollah preserve its telecoms network and re-instating the airport's security chief.

At the end, rival Lebanese leaders reached consensus over Doha Agreement on 21 May 2008, to end the 18-month political feud that exploded into fighting and nearly drove the country to a new civil war. On the basis of this agreement, Hezbollah and its opposition allies were effectively granted veto power in Lebanon's parliament. At the end of the conflicts, National unity government was formed by Fouad Siniora on 11 July 2008, with Hezbollah controlling one ministerial and eleven of thirty cabinet places.

In 2018 Lebanese general election, Hezbollah general secretary Hassan Nasrallah presented the names of the 13 Hezbollah candidates. On 22 March 2018, Nasrallah issued a statement outlining the main priorities for the parliamentary bloc of the party, Loyalty to the Resistance, in the next parliament. He stated that rooting out corruption would be the foremost priority of the Loyalty to the Resistance Bloc. The electoral slogan of the party was 'We will construct and we will protect'. Finally Hezbollah held 12 seats and its alliance won the election by gaining 70 out of 128 seats of Parliament of Lebanon.

In October 2024, leader of the Free Patriotic Movement, Gebran Bassil, announced that the party was no longer in alliance with Hezbollah. In February 2025, Lebanese Prime Minister Nawaf Salam announced his government, which consists of 24 ministers; the Hezbollah controls two portfolios; the Public Health Ministry, headed by Rakan Nasredine, and the Labour Ministry, headed by Muhammad Haidar. The Hizbullah and Amal Bloc controls together six portfolios in the government.

According to a poll conducted by Information International and published in May 2026 by Lebanese Al-Jadeed, about 58% of respondents supported state monopoly on arms and the disarmament of non-state actors such as Hezbollah. While 88% of Shi’ites and 70% of Sunni respondents opposed Hezbollah’s disarmament, 89% of Orthodox Christians, 87% of Maronites, and 77% of Druze- agreed it should be disarmed.

=== Media operations ===
Hezbollah operates a satellite television station, Al-Manar TV ("the Lighthouse"), and a radio station, al-Nour ("the Light"). Al-Manar broadcasts from Beirut, Lebanon. Hezbollah launched the station in 1991 with the help of Iranian funds. Al-Manar, the self-proclaimed "Station of the Resistance", (qanat al-muqawama) is a key player in what Hezbollah calls its "psychological warfare against the Zionist enemy" and an integral part of Hezbollah's plan to spread its message to the entire Arab world.

Hezbollah's television station Al-Manar airs programming designed to inspire suicide attacks in Gaza, the West Bank, and Iraq. Al-Manar's transmission in France is prohibited due to its promotion of Holocaust denial, a criminal offence in France. The United States lists Al-Manar television network as a terrorist organisation. Al-Manar was designated as a "Specially Designated Global Terrorist entity", and banned by the United States in December 2004. It has also been banned by France, Spain, and Germany.

Hezbollah is also associated with Al-Ahed ("the Covenant"), a weekly newspaper and online platform that publishes news reports, editorials, and ideological material aligned with the organisation's positions. It was established in 1984. It is the only media outlet which is openly affiliated with the organisation.

Additionally, Hezbollah operates cultural centres, such as the "Imam Khomeini Cultural Centres", and research institutions that organise lectures, seminars, and study circles focusing on Shiʿi theology, political ideology, and narratives of resistance. These institutions are used for both public outreach and internal cadre education.

Materials aimed at instilling principles of nationalism and Islam in children are an aspect of Hezbollah's media operations. The Hezbollah Central Internet Bureau released two video games – Special Force in 2003 and a sequel, Special Force 2: Tale of the Truthful Pledge, in 2007 – in which players are rewarded with points and weapons for killing Israeli soldiers. In 2012, Al-Manar aired a television special praising an 8-year-old boy who raised money for Hezbollah and said: "When I grow up, I will be a communist resistance warrior with Hezbollah, fighting the United States and Israel, I will tear them to pieces and drive them out of Lebanon, the Golan and Palestine, which I love very dearly."

== Secret services ==
Hezbollah's secret services have been called as "one of the best in the world", and have even infiltrated the Israeli army. Lebanese intelligence agencies and Iranian intelligence agencies often collaborate with Hezbollah's secret services.

In the summer of 1982, Hezbollah's Special Security Apparatus was created by Hussein al-Khalil, now a "top political adviser to Nasrallah"; while Hezbollah's counterintelligence was initially managed by Iran's Quds Force, the organisation continued to grow during the 1990s. By 2008, scholar Carl Anthony Wege writes, "Hizballah had obtained complete dominance over Lebanon's official state counterintelligence apparatus, which now constituted a Hizballah asset for counterintelligence purposes." This close connection with Lebanese intelligence helped bolster Hezbollah's financial counterintelligence unit.

According to Ahmad Hamzeh, Hezbollah's counterintelligence service is divided into Amn al-Muddad, responsible for "external" or "encounter" security; and Amn al-Hizb, which protects the organisation's integrity and its leaders. According to Wege, Amn al-Muddad "may have received specialised intelligence training in Iran and possibly North Korea". The organisation also includes a military security component, as well as an External Security Organisation (al-Amn al-Khariji or Unit 910) that operates covertly outside Lebanon.

Successful Hezbollah counterintelligence operations include thwarting the CIA's attempted kidnapping of foreign operations chief Hassan Ezzeddine in 1994, the 1997 manipulation of a double agent that led to the Ansariya ambush, and the 2000 kidnapping of alleged Mossad agent Elhanan Tannenbaum. In 2006, Hezbollah collaborated with the Lebanese government to detect Adeeb al-Alam, a former colonel, as an Israeli spy. Hezbollah recruited IDF Lieutenant Colonel Omar al-Heib, who was convicted in 2006 of conducting surveillance for Hezbollah. In 2009, Hezbollah apprehended Marwan Faqih, a garage owner who installed tracking devices in Hezbollah-owned vehicles.

Hezbollah's counterintelligence apparatus uses electronic surveillance and intercept technologies. By 2011, Hezbollah counterintelligence began to use software to analyse cellphone data and detect espionage. Suspicious callers were then subjected to conventional surveillance. In the mid-1990s, Hezbollah was able to "download unencrypted video feeds from Israeli drones", and Israeli SIGINT efforts intensified after the 2000 withdrawal from Lebanon. With possible help from Iran and the Russian FSB, Hezbollah augmented its electronic counterintelligence capabilities, and succeeded in 2008 in detecting Israeli bugs near Mount Sannine and in the organisation's fibre optic network.

== Armed strength ==
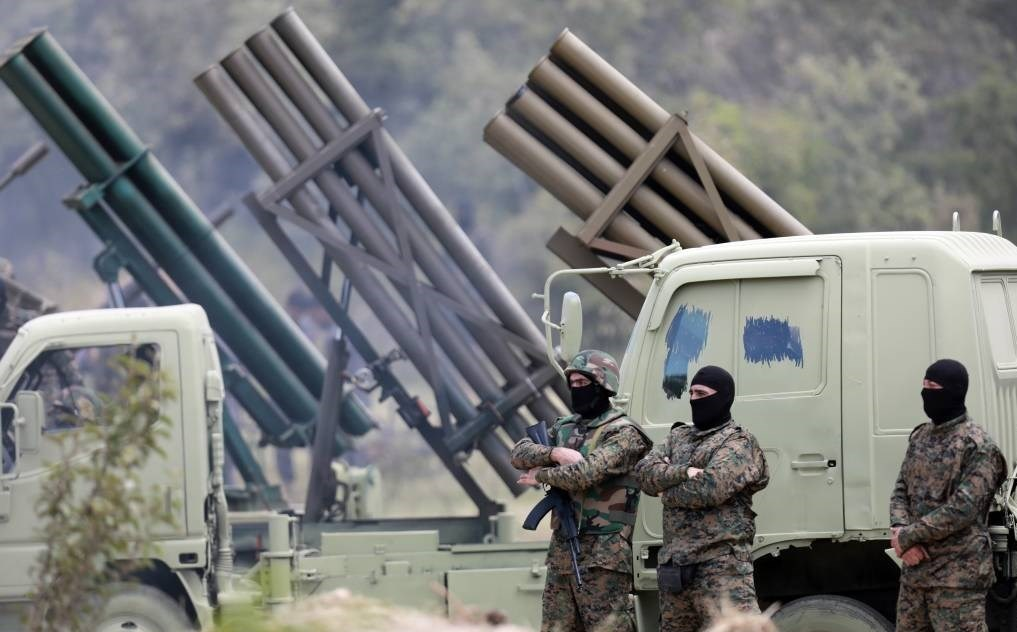
Hezbollah fighters in southern Lebanon, May 2023

Hezbollah does not reveal its armed strength. The Dubai-based Gulf Research Centre estimated in 2006 that Hezbollah's armed wing comprises 1,000 full-time Hezbollah members, along with a further 6,000–10,000 volunteers. According to the Iranian Fars News Agency, Hezbollah has up to 65,000 fighters. In October 2023, Al Jazeera cited Hezbollah expert Nicholas Blanford as estimating that Hezbollah has at least 60,000 fighters, including full-time and reservists, and that it had increased its stockpile of missiles from 14,000 in 2006 to about 150,000. It is often described as more militarily powerful than the Lebanese Army. Israeli commander Guy Tzur called Hezbollah "by far the greatest guerrilla group in the world".

In 2010, Hezbollah was believed to have 45,000 rockets. IDF Chief of Staff Gadi Eisenkot said that Hezbollah possesses "tens of thousands" of long- and short-range rockets, drones, advanced computer encryption capabilities, as well as advanced defence capabilities like the SA-6 anti-aircraft missile system.

Hezbollah possesses the Katyusha-122 rocket, which has a range of 29 km (18 mi) and carries a 15 kg (33 lb) warhead. Hezbollah possesses about 100 long-range missiles. They include the Iranian-made Fajr-3 and Fajr-5, the latter with a range of 75 km (47 mi), enabling it to strike the Israeli port of Haifa, and the Zelzal-1, with an estimated 150 km (93 mi) range, which can reach Tel Aviv. Fajr-3 missiles have a range of 40 km (25 mi) and a 45 kg (99 lb) warhead. Fajr-5 missiles, extend to 72 km (45 mi), also hold 45 kg (99 lb) warheads. It was reported that Hezbollah is in possession of Scud missiles that were provided to them by Syria. Syria denied the reports.

According to various reports, Hezbollah is armed with anti-tank guided missiles, namely, the Russian-made AT-3 Sagger, AT-4 Spigot, AT-5 Spandrel, AT-13 Saxhorn-2 'Metis-M', АТ-14 Spriggan 'Kornet', Iranian-made Ra'ad (version of AT-3 Sagger), Towsan (version of AT-5 Spandrel), Toophan (version of BGM-71 TOW), and European-made MILAN missiles. These weapons have been used against IDF soldiers, causing many of the deaths during the 2006 Lebanon War. US courts said that North Korea provided armaments to Hezbollah during the 2006 war. A small number of Saeghe-2s, an Iranian-made version of the M47 Dragon, were also used in the war.

For air defence, Hezbollah has anti-aircraft weapons that include the ZU-23 artillery and the man-portable, shoulder-fired SA-7 and SA-18 surface-to-air missile (SAM). One of the most effective weapons deployed by Hezbollah has been the C-802 anti-ship missile.

In April 2010, U.S. Secretary of Defence Robert Gates claimed that Hezbollah has far more missiles and rockets than the majority of countries, and said that Syria and Iran are providing weapons to the organisation. Israel also claims that Syria is providing the organisation with these weapons. Syria has denied supplying these weapons and views these claims as an Israeli excuse for an attack. Leaked cables from US diplomats suggest that the United States has been trying unsuccessfully to prevent Syria from "supplying arms to Hezbollah in Lebanon", and that Hezbollah has "amassed a huge stockpile (of arms) since its 2006 war with Israel"; the arms were described as "increasingly sophisticated". Gates added that Hezbollah is possibly armed with chemical or biological weapons, as well as 105 km (65 mi) anti-ship missiles that could threaten U.S. ships.

As of 2017, the Israeli government believe Hezbollah had an arsenal of nearly 150,000 rockets stationed on its border with Lebanon. Some of these missiles are said to be capable of penetrating cities as far away as Eilat. The IDF has accused Hezbollah of storing these rockets beneath hospitals, schools, and civilian homes. Hezbollah has used drones against Israel, by penetrating air defence systems, in a report verified by Nasrallah, who added, "This is only part of our capabilities."

Israeli military officials and analysts have drawn attention to the experience and weaponry Hezbollah would have gained from the involvement of thousands of its fighters in the Syrian Civil War. "This kind of experience cannot be bought", said Gabi Siboni, director of the military and strategic affairs program at the Institute for National Security Studies at Tel Aviv University. "It is an additional factor that we will have to deal with. There is no replacement for experience, and it is not to be scoffed at."

In 2026 the Alma institute estimated that Hezbollah stores 25,000 rockets and is capable of launching several dozens a day. Additionally it estimated that Hezbollah has several hundreds of advanced missiles, a thousand one-way attack drones, and its manpower includes 40,000 regular militants, out of which 5,000 operate under the Radwan Force and 3,000 are experienced with launching anti-tank missiles, and trained for invading Israel through land and sea.

Hezbollah used fiber optic drones in the 2026 Lebanon war as part of the Hezbollah–Israel conflict.

== Military activities ==
Hezbollah has a military branch known as the Jihad Council, one component of which is Al-Muqawama al-Islamiyya ("The Islamic Resistance"), and is the possible sponsor of a number of lesser-known militant groups, some of which may be little more than fronts for Hezbollah itself, including the Organisation of the Oppressed, the Revolutionary Justice Organisation, the Organisation of Right Against Wrong, and Followers of the Prophet Muhammad. Some scholars have regarded Hezbollah as a resistance movement.

United Nations Security Council Resolution 1559 called for the disarmament of militia with the Taif agreement at the end of the Lebanese civil war. Hezbollah denounced, and protested against, the resolution. The 2006 military conflict with Israel has increased the controversy. Failure to disarm remains a violation of the resolution and agreement as well as subsequent United Nations Security Council Resolution 1701. Since then both Israel and Hezbollah have asserted that the organisation has gained in military strength.

A Lebanese public opinion poll taken in August 2006 shows that most of the Shia did not believe that Hezbollah should disarm after the 2006 Lebanon war, while the majority of Sunni, Druze and Christians believed that they should. The Lebanese cabinet, under President Michel Suleiman and Prime Minister Fouad Siniora, guidelines state that Hezbollah enjoys the right to "liberate occupied lands". In 2009, a Hezbollah commander, speaking on condition of anonymity, said, "[W]e have far more rockets and missiles [now] than we did in 2006."

=== Lebanese Resistance Brigades ===
Lebanese Resistance Brigades Saraya al-Moukawama al-Lubnaniyya
- سرايا المقاومة اللبنانية
- Leaders: Mohammed Aknan (Beirut); Mohammad Saleh (Sidon) †
- Dates active: 1998–2000; 2009–present
- Active regions: Southern Lebanon, mainly Sidon
- Part of: Hezbollah
- Wars: South Lebanon conflict (1985–2000) and Battle of Sidon (2013)

The Lebanese Resistance Brigades (Arabic: سرايا المقاومة اللبنانية, romanized: Sarāyā l-Muqāwama al-Lubnāniyya), also known as the Lebanese Brigades to Resist the Israeli Occupation, were formed by Hezbollah in 1997 as a multi-faith (Christian, Druze, Sunni and Shia) volunteer force to combat the Israeli occupation of Southern Lebanon. With the Israeli withdrawal from Lebanon in 2000, the organisation was disbanded.

In 2009, the Resistance Brigades were reactivated, mainly comprising Sunni supporters from the southern city of Sidon. Its strength was reduced in late 2013 from 500 to 200–250 due to residents' complaints about some fighters of the group exacerbating tensions with the local community.

=== The beginning of its military activities: the South Lebanon conflict ===
Hezbollah has been involved in several cases of armed conflict with Israel: during the 1982–2000 South Lebanon conflict, Hezbollah waged a guerrilla campaign against Israeli forces occupying Southern Lebanon. In 1982, the Palestine Liberation Organisation (PLO) was based in Southern Lebanon and was firing Katyusha rockets into northern Israel from Lebanon. Israel invaded Lebanon to evict the PLO, and Hezbollah became an armed organisation to expel the Israelis. Hezbollah's strength was enhanced by the dispatching of one thousand to two thousand members of the Iranian Revolutionary Guards and the financial backing of Iran.

Iranian clerics, most notably Fzlollah Mahallati supervised this activity. It became the main politico-military force among the Shia community in Lebanon and the main arm of what became known later as the Islamic Resistance in Lebanon. With the collapse of the SLA, and the rapid advance of Hezbollah forces, Israel withdrew on 24 May 2000 six weeks before the announced 7 July date."

Hezbollah held a victory parade, and its popularity in Lebanon rose. Israel withdrew in accordance with 1978's United Nations Security Council Resolution 425. Hezbollah and many analysts considered this a victory for the movement, and since then its popularity has been boosted in Lebanon.

=== Disputed attacks ===
Between 1982 and 1986, there were many attacks blamed on Hezbollah, although Hezbollah denied responsibility. Given that Hezbollah didn't officially exist at the time of many of these attacks (it officially came into existence in 1985) leads some scholars to be sceptical of implicating Hezbollah in these attacks. The first of these attacks were the April 1983 US Embassy bombing and 1983 Beirut barracks bombing, both attributed to Hezbollah by some Western intelligence agencies. Hezbollah denied responsibility for both the embassy bombing and the barracks bombing.

In the Lebanon hostage crisis, 105 people were kidnapped between 1982 and 1992. A variety of organisations took responsibility for these kidnappings: Organisation of Islamic Jihād for the Liberation of Palestine, Organisation for Revolutionary Justice, the Fajr Organisation, the Khaybar Brigade, and the Organisation of the World's Oppressed. Hezbollah denied kidnapping these individuals, but was blamed anyway. Recent research has shown that the kidnappers were of various political backgrounds, and were often motivated by familial feuds or were looking for monetary ransom.

Since 1990, terror acts and attempts of which Hezbollah has been blamed include the following bombings and attacks against civilians and diplomats:

- The 1992 Israeli Embassy attack in Buenos Aires, killing 29, in Argentina. Hezbollah operatives boasted of involvement.
- The 1994 AMIA bombing of a Jewish cultural centre, killing 85, in Argentina. Ansar Allah, a Palestinian group closely associated with Hezbollah, claimed responsibility.
- The 1994 AC Flight 901 attack, killing 21, in Panama. Ansar Allah claimed responsibility.
- The 1996 Khobar Towers bombing, killing 19 US servicemen.
- In 2002, Singapore accused Hezbollah of recruiting Singaporeans in a failed 1990s plot to attack US and Israeli ships in the Singapore Straits.
- 15 January 2008, bombing of a US Embassy vehicle in Beirut.
- In 2009, a Hezbollah plot in Egypt was uncovered, where Egyptian authorities arrested 49 men for planning attacks against Israeli and Egyptian targets in the Sinai Peninsula.
- The 2012 Burgas bus bombing, killing 6, in Bulgaria. Hezbollah denied responsibility.
- Training Shia insurgents against US troops during the Iraq War.

=== During the Bosnian War ===
Hezbollah provided fighters to fight on the Bosnian Muslim side during the Bosnian War, as part of the broader Iranian involvement. "The Bosnian Muslim government is a client of the Iranians", wrote Robert Baer, a CIA agent stationed in Sarajevo during the war. "If it's a choice between the CIA and the Iranians, they'll take the Iranians any day." By the war's end, public opinion polls showed some 86% Bosnian Muslims had a positive opinion of Iran. In conjunction, Hezbollah initially sent 150 fighters to fight against the Bosnian Serb Army, the Bosnian Muslims' main opponent in the war. All Shia foreign advisors and fighters withdrew from Bosnia at the end of conflict.

=== Conflict with Israel ===
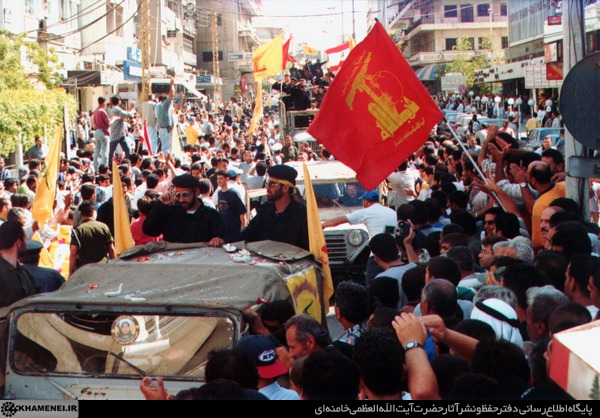
Hezbollah members and supporters parade following the end of the Israeli occupation of Southern Lebanon, May 2000

On 25 July 1993, following Hezbollah's killing of seven Israeli soldiers in southern Lebanon, Israel launched Operation Accountability, known in Lebanon as the Seven Day War, during which the IDF carried out their heaviest artillery and air attacks on targets in southern Lebanon since 1982. The aim of the operation was to eradicate the threat posed by Hezbollah and to force the civilian population north to Beirut so as to put pressure on the Lebanese Government to restrain Hezbollah. The fighting ended when an unwritten understanding was agreed to by the warring parties. Apparently, the 1993 understanding provided that Hezbollah combatants would not fire rockets at northern Israel, while Israel would not attack civilians or civilian targets in Lebanon.

In April 1996, after continued Hezbollah rocket attacks on Israeli civilians, the Israeli armed forces launched Operation Grapes of Wrath, which was intended to wipe out Hezbollah's base in southern Lebanon. Over 100 Lebanese refugees were killed by the shelling of a UN base at Qana, in what the Israeli military said was a mistake.

Following several days of negotiations, the two sides signed the Grapes of Wrath Understandings on 26 April 1996. A cease-fire was agreed upon between Israel and Hezbollah, which would be effective on 27 April 1996. Both sides agreed that civilians should not be targeted, which meant that Hezbollah would be allowed to continue its military activities against IDF forces inside Lebanon.

==== 2000 Hezbollah cross-border raid ====
On 7 October 2000, three Israeli soldiers—Adi Avitan, Staff Sgt. Benyamin Avraham, and Staff Sgt. Omar Sawaidwere—were abducted by Hezbollah while patrolling the border between the Israeli-occupied Golan Heights and Lebanon. The soldiers were killed either during the attack or in its immediate aftermath. Israel Defence Minister Shaul Mofaz said that Hezbollah abducted the soldiers and then killed them. The bodies of the slain soldiers were exchanged for Lebanese prisoners in 2004.

==== 2006 Lebanon War ====
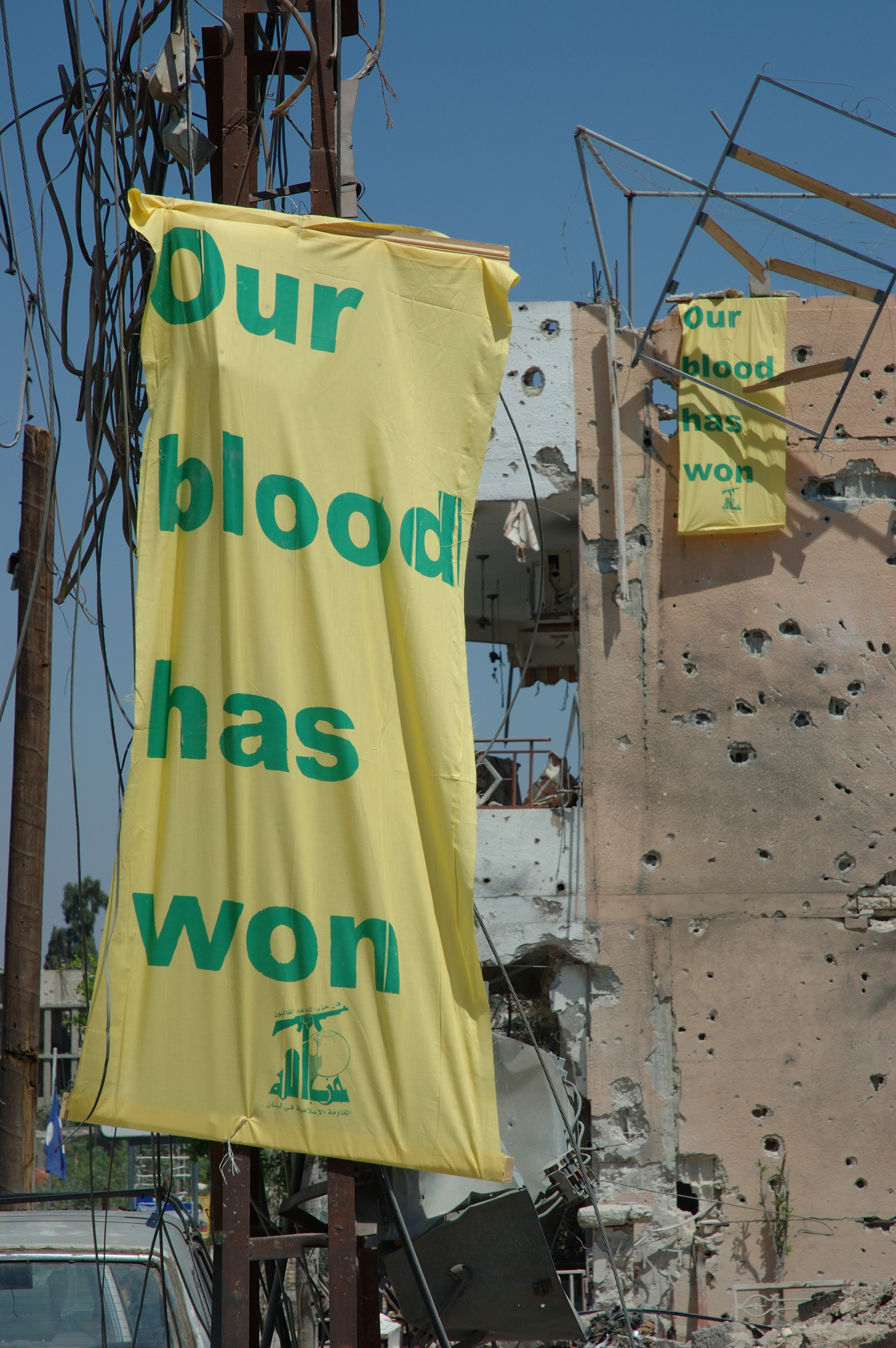
Hezbollah posters in the aftermath of the 2006 Lebanon War

The 2006 Lebanon War was a 34-day military conflict in Lebanon and northern Israel. The principal parties were Hezbollah paramilitary forces and the Israeli military. The conflict was precipitated by a cross-border raid during which Hezbollah kidnapped and killed Israeli soldiers. The conflict began on 12 July 2006 when Hezbollah militants fired rockets at Israeli border towns as a diversion for an anti-tank missile attack on two armoured Humvees patrolling the Israeli side of the border fence, killing three, injuring two, and seizing two Israeli soldiers.

Israel responded with airstrikes and artillery fire on targets in Lebanon that damaged Lebanese infrastructure, including Beirut's Rafic Hariri International Airport, which Israel said that Hezbollah used to import weapons and supplies, an air and naval blockade, and a ground invasion of southern Lebanon. Hezbollah then launched more rockets into northern Israel and engaged the IDF in guerrilla warfare from hardened positions.

The war continued until 14 August 2006. Hezbollah was responsible for thousands of Katyusha rocket attacks against Israeli civilian towns and cities in northern Israel, which Hezbollah said were in retaliation for Israel's killing of civilians and targeting Lebanese infrastructure. The conflict is believed to have killed 1,191–1,300 Lebanese citizens including combatants and 165 Israelis including soldiers.

==== 2010 gas field claims ====
In 2010, Hezbollah claimed that the Dalit and Tamar gas field, discovered by Noble Energy roughly 80 km (50 mi) west of Haifa in Israeli exclusive economic zone, belong to Lebanon, and warned Israel against extracting gas from them. Senior officials from Hezbollah warned that they would not hesitate to use weapons to defend Lebanon's natural resources. Figures in the March 14 Forces stated in response that Hezbollah was presenting another excuse to hold on to its arms. Lebanese MP Antoine Zahra said that the issue is another item "in the endless list of excuses" meant to justify the continued existence of Hezbollah's arsenal.

==== 2011 attack in Istanbul ====
In July 2011, Italian newspaper Corriere della Sera reported, based on US and Turkish sources, that Hezbollah was behind a bombing in Istanbul in May 2011 that wounded eight Turkish civilians. The report said that the attack was an assassination attempt on the Israeli consul to Turkey, Moshe Kimchi. Turkish intelligence sources denied the report and said, "Israel is in the habit of creating disinformation campaigns using different papers."

==== 2012 planned attack in Cyprus ====
In July 2012, a Lebanese man was detained by Cyprus police on possible charges relating to terrorism laws for planning attacks against Israeli tourists. According to security officials, the man was planning attacks for Hezbollah in Cyprus and admitted this after questioning. The police were alerted about the man due to an urgent message from Israeli intelligence. The Lebanese man was in possession of photographs of Israeli targets and had information on Israeli airlines flying back and forth from Cyprus, and planned to blow up a plane or tour bus. Israeli Prime Minister Benjamin Netanyahu stated that Iran assisted the Lebanese man with planning the attacks.

==== 2012 Burgas attack ====
Following an investigation into the 2012 Burgas bus bombing terrorist attack against Israeli citizens in Bulgaria, the Bulgarian government officially accused the Lebanese-militant movement Hezbollah of committing the attack. Five Israeli citizens, the Bulgarian bus driver, and the bomber were killed. The bomb exploded as the Israeli tourists boarded a bus from the airport to their hotel.

Tsvetan Tsvetanov, Bulgaria's interior minister, reported that the two suspects responsible were members of the militant wing of Hezbollah; he said the suspected terrorists entered Bulgaria on 28 June and remained until 18 July. Israel had already previously suspected Hezbollah for the attack. Israeli Prime Minister Benjamin Netanyahu called the report "further corroboration of what we have already known, that Hezbollah and its Iranian patrons are orchestrating a worldwide campaign of terror that is spanning countries and continents". Netanyahu said that the attack in Bulgaria was just one of many that Hezbollah and Iran have planned and carried out, including attacks in Thailand, Kenya, Turkey, India, Azerbaijan, Cyprus and Georgia.

John Brennan, Director of the Central Intelligence Agency, has said that, "Bulgaria's investigation exposes Hezbollah for what it is—a terrorist group that is willing to recklessly attack innocent men, women and children, and that poses a real and growing threat not only to Europe, but to the rest of the world." The result of the Bulgarian investigation comes at a time when Israel has been petitioning the European Union to join the United States in designating Hezbollah as a terrorist organisation.

==== 2015 Shebaa farms incident ====
In response to an attack against a military convoy comprising Hezbollah and Iranian officers on 18 January 2015 at Quneitra in south of Syria, Hezbollah launched an ambush on 28 January against an Israeli military convoy in the Israeli-occupied Shebaa Farms with anti-tank missiles against two Israeli vehicles patrolling the border, killing 2 and wounding 7 Israeli soldiers and officers, as confirmed by Israeli military.

==== 2023–present Israel–Hezbollah conflict ====
On 8 October 2023, Hezbollah launched guided rockets and artillery shells at Israeli-occupied positions in Shebaa Farms during the Gaza war. Israel retaliated with drone strikes and artillery fire on Hezbollah positions near the Golan Heights–Lebanon border. The attacks came after Hezbollah expressed support and praise for the Hamas attacks on Israel. The clashes were the largest escalation between the two countries since the 2006 Lebanon War.

In November 2024, a ceasefire deal was signed between Israel and Hezbollah to end 13 months of conflict. According to the agreement, Hezbollah was given 60 days to end its armed presence in southern Lebanon and Israeli forces were obliged to withdraw from the area over the same period. In December 2024, the fall of Assad's Baathist regime in Syria was another blow to its Lebanese ally, Hezbollah, which was already weakened because of Israeli military actions.

On 31 March 2025, a significant development took place as the LAF and UNIFIL forces entered a major Hezbollah weapons and storage camp in East Zawtar, near the Litani River—one of Hezbollah's largest and most strategic facilities in southern Lebanon. The move followed renewed tensions and Israeli threats to resume military operations, amid accusations of recent rocket fire toward Kiryat Shmona. Joint forces reportedly searched Hezbollah vehicles and found an empty missile launcher. It remains unclear whether Hezbollah consented to the operation. This action was seen as part of efforts to enforce UN Resolution 1701, which calls for disarming illegal groups south of the Litani and reinforcing the army's presence in the region.

On 1 March 2026, for the first time since the joint Israeli-US strikes against Iran, Hezbollah launched missiles and drones targeting northern and central Israel, as retaliation for the killing of Ali Khamenei. This led Israel to a series of major airstrikes on Southern Beirut (Dahieh), Beqaa Valley and areas near Tyre, targeting Senior Hezbollah operatives.

==== Rearming of Hezbollah ====
Since the 2024 Israel–Lebanon ceasefire agreement, Hezbollah is rearming itself. According to Israeli and Arab intelligence sources, the organisation is using the Beirut seaport and its old smuggling land routes form Syria, for bringing in long range missiles, antitank missiles, artillery and rockets. It is also reported that Hezbollah is manufacturing weapons. The efforts take place mainly in the suburbs of Beirut and the Beqaa Valley. On 16 July 2026, Syria's Interior Ministry said it had intercepted a shipment of long-range missiles, anti-tank missiles, and drones allegedly bound for Hezbollah after entering from the Syrian–Iraqi border.

=== Assassination of Rafic Hariri ===
On 14 February 2005, former Lebanese Prime Minister Rafic Hariri was killed, along with 21 others, when his motorcade was struck by a roadside bomb in Beirut. He had been PM during 1992–1998 and 2000–2004. In 2009, the UN special tribunal investigating the murder of Hariri reportedly found evidence linking Hezbollah to the murder.

In August 2010, in response to notification that the UN tribunal would indict some Hezbollah members, Hassan Nasrallah said Israel was looking for a way to assassinate Hariri as early as 1993 in order to create political chaos that would force Syria to withdraw from Lebanon, and to perpetuate an anti-Syrian atmosphere [in Lebanon] in the wake of the assassination. He went on to say that in 1996 Hezbollah apprehended an agent working for Israel by the name of Ahmed Nasrallah—no relation to Hassan Nasrallah—who allegedly contacted Hariri's security detail and told them that he had solid proof that Hezbollah was planning to take his life. Hariri then contacted Hezbollah and advised them of the situation. Saad Hariri responded that the UN should investigate these claims.

On 30 June 2011, the Special Tribunal for Lebanon, established to investigate the death of Hariri, issued arrest warrants against four senior members of Hezbollah, including Mustafa Badreddine. On 3 July, Hassan Nasrallah rejected the indictment and denounced the tribunal as a plot against the party, vowing that the named persons would not be arrested under any circumstances.

On 18 August 2020, the Special Tribunal for Lebanon found Salim Ayyash, a senior operative in Hezbollah, guilty in absentia of five charges including the intentional murder of Hariri with premeditation by using explosive materials.

=== Involvement in the Syrian Civil War ===
Hezbollah was a long time ally of the Syrian Ba'athist regime, led by the Al-Assad family until its downfall in 2024. Hezbollah has helped the Syrian government during the Syrian civil war in its fight against the Syrian opposition, which Hezbollah has described as a Zionist plot to destroy its alliance with al-Assad against Israel. Geneive Abdo opined that Hezbollah's support for al-Assad in the Syrian war has "transformed" it from a group with "support among the Sunni for defeating Israel in a battle in 2006" into a "strictly Shia paramilitary force". Hezbollah also fought against the Islamic State.

In August 2012, the United States sanctioned Hezbollah for its alleged role in the war. General Secretary Nasrallah denied Hezbollah had been fighting on behalf of the Syrian government, stating in a 12 October 2012, speech that "right from the start the Syrian opposition has been telling the media that Hezbullah sent 3,000 fighters to Syria, which we have denied". However, according to the Lebanese Daily Star newspaper, Nasrallah said in the same speech that Hezbollah fighters helped the Syrian government "retain control of some 23 strategically located villages [in Syria] inhabited by Shiites of Lebanese citizenship". Nasrallah said that Hezbollah fighters have died in Syria doing their "jihadist duties".

In 2012, Hezbollah fighters crossed the border from Lebanon and took over eight villages in the Al-Qusayr District of Syria. On 16–17 February 2013, Syrian opposition groups claimed that Hezbollah, backed by the Syrian military, attacked three neighbouring Sunni villages controlled by the Free Syrian Army (FSA). An FSA spokesman said, "Hezbollah's invasion is the first of its kind in terms of organisation, planning and coordination with the Syrian regime's air force." Hezbollah said three Lebanese Shiites, "acting in self-defence", were killed in the clashes with the FSA. Lebanese security sources said that the three were Hezbollah members. In response, the FSA allegedly attacked two Hezbollah positions on 21 February; one in Syria and one in Lebanon. Five days later, it said it destroyed a convoy carrying Hezbollah fighters and Syrian officers to Lebanon, killing all the passengers.

In January 2013, a weapons convoy carrying SA-17 anti-aircraft missiles to Hezbollah was destroyed allegedly by the Israeli Air Force. A nearby research centre for chemical weapons was also damaged. A similar attack on weapons destined for Hezbollah occurred in May of the same year.

The leaders of the March 14 alliance and other prominent Lebanese figures called on Hezbollah to end its involvement in Syria and said it is putting Lebanon at risk. Subhi al-Tufayli, Hezbollah's former leader, said, "Hezbollah should not be defending the criminal regime that kills its own people and that has never fired a shot in defence of the Palestinians." He said, "those Hezbollah fighters who are killing children and terrorising people and destroying houses in Syria will go to hell."

The Consultative Gathering, a group of Shia and Sunni leaders in Baalbek-Hermel, also called on Hezbollah not to "interfere" in Syria. They said, "Opening a front against the Syrian people and dragging Lebanon to war with the Syrian people is very dangerous and will have a negative impact on the relations between the two." Walid Jumblatt, leader of the Progressive Socialist Party, also called on Hezbollah to end its involvement, and claimed that, "Hezbollah is fighting inside Syria with orders from Iran."

Egyptian President Mohamed Morsi condemned Hezbollah by saying, "We stand against Hezbollah in its aggression against the Syrian people. There is no space or place for Hezbollah in Syria." Support for Hezbollah among the Syrian public has weakened since the involvement of Hezbollah and Iran in propping up the Assad regime during the civil war.

On 12 May 2013, Hezbollah with the Syrian army attempted to retake part of Al-Qusayr. In Lebanon, there has been "a recent increase in the funerals of Hezbollah fighters" and "Syrian rebels have shelled Hezbollah-controlled areas".

On 25 May 2013, Nasrallah announced that Hezbollah is fighting in the Syrian Civil War against Islamic extremists and "pledged that his group will not allow Syrian militants to control areas that border Lebanon". He confirmed that Hezbollah was fighting in the strategic Syrian town of Al-Qusayr on the same side as Assad's forces. In the televised address, he said, "If Syria falls in the hands of the US, Israel and the takfiris, the people of our region will go into a dark period."

=== Involvement in Iranian-led intervention in Iraq ===
Beginning in July 2014, Hezbollah sent an undisclosed number of technical advisers and intelligence analysts to Baghdad in support of the Iranian intervention in Iraq. Shortly thereafter, Hezbollah commander Ibrahim al-Hajj was reported killed in action near Mosul.

=== Latin America operations ===
Hezbollah operations in South America began in the late 20th century, centred around the Arab population which had moved there following the 1948 Arab-Israeli War and the 1985 Lebanese Civil War. One particular form of alleged activity is money laundering. The Los Angeles Times said that the group was more active in the 1990s, especially during the 1992 Israeli embassy bombing in Argentina, though its relevance grew more unclear as time progressed. Vox writes that following the adoption of the Patriot Act in 2001, the Drug Enforcement Administration (DEA) would promote the term of narcoterrorism and arrest individuals with no prior history of being involved in terrorism, suggesting scepticism towards the reports of large-scale collusion between alleged terrorist groups and cartels.

In 2002, Hezbollah was reported to be openly operating in Ciudad del Este, Paraguay. Beginning in 2008, the DEA began with Project Cassandra to work against reported Hezbollah activities in regards to Latin American drug trafficking. The investigation by the DEA reported that Hezbollah made about a billion US dollars a year and trafficked thousands of tons of cocaine into the United States. Another destination for cocaine trafficking done by Hezbollah are nations within the Gulf Cooperation Council (GCC). In 2013, Hezbollah was accused of infiltrating South America and having ties with Latin American drug cartels.

One area of operations is in the region of the Triple Frontier, where Hezbollah has been alleged to be involved in the trafficking of cocaine; officials with the Lebanese embassy in Paraguay have worked to counter US allegations and extradition attempts. In 2016, it was alleged that money gained from drug sales was used to purchase weapons in Syria. In 2018, Infobae reported that Hezbollah was operating in Colombia under the name Organisation of External Security. That same year, Argentine police arrested individuals alleged to be connected to Hezbollah's criminal activities within the nation.

The Los Angeles Times noted in 2020 that at the time, Hezbollah served as a "bogeyman of sorts" and that "[p]undits and politicians in the U.S., particularly those on the far right, have long issued periodic warnings that Hezbollah and other Islamic groups pose a serious threat in Latin America". Various allegations have been made that Cuba, Nicaragua and Venezuela aid Hezbollah in its operations in the region. Israeli reports about the presence of Hezbollah in Latin America raised questions amongst Latin American analysts based in the United States while experts say that reports of presence in Latin America are exaggerated.

Southern Pulse director and analyst Samuel Logan said "Geopolitical proximity to Tehran doesn't directly translate into leniency of Hezbollah activity inside your country" in an interview with the Pulitzer Center. William Neuman in his 2022 book Things Are Never So Bad That They Can't Get Worse said that claims of Hezbollah's presence in Latin America was "in reality, minimal", writing that the Venezuelan opposition raised such allegations to persuade the United States into believing that the nation faced a threat from Venezuela in an effort to promote foreign intervention.

=== United States operations ===
Ali Kourani, the first Hezbollah operative to be convicted and sentenced in the United States, was under investigation since 2013 and worked to provide targeting and terrorist recruiting information to Hezbollah's Islamic Jihad Organisation (IJO). The organisation had recruited a former resident of Minnesota and a military linguist, Mariam Tala Thompson, who disclosed "identities of at least eight clandestine human assets; at least 10 US targets; and multiple tactics, techniques and procedures" before she was discovered and successfully prosecuted in a US court.

=== Other ===
In 2010, Ahbash and Hezbollah members were involved in a street battle which was perceived to be over parking issues, both groups later met to form a joint compensation fund for the victims of the conflict.

According to Reuters, in 2024, commanders from Hezbollah and Iran's IRGC were reported to be involved in Yemen, overseeing and directing Houthi attacks on Red Sea shipping.

== Funding ==
Since it was established, Hezbollah has been heavily dependent on Iran's IRGC for funds and equipment that often arrive through Syria. According to US officials, it received an annual sum of up to US$700 million. Since the 1990s it became part of the Lebanese government and financial systems, while expanding its activities overseas through various businesses, smuggling, and money laundering, mainly in South America and West Africa. According to Dr. Eitan Azani and Ms. Lorena Atiyas-Lvovsky at the Reichman University Institute of Counter Terrorism, the Lebanese Shiite diaspora in Africa and Latin America's Triple Frontier send contributions or forced donations in cash and via other informal transfer systems. Following the 2006 conflict with Israel, Iran increased its financial support of Hezbollah. In 2016, the DEA's “Project Cassandra” said that part of Hezbollah's security wing, called the “Business Affairs Component,” was helping to move drug money around, allegedly using this money to buy weapons for the war in Syria. Western sanctions targeted Hezbollah financial channels and caused the organisation to shift to clandestine operations that included money laundering, and in recent years more into cryptocurrency.

The latest reports in Canada, show that the country has long been a hub of Hezbollah's financial networks. As of 2025, the organisation continues its activity in Canada, using car trade making a profit on cars shipped through the Port of Montreal. In 2024 Canada launched Operation Vector in which it prevented the smuggling of 598 cars with the estimated value of $34.5 million. Other financial networks include fake charities, money laundering, cryptocurrencies, money services businesses (MSBs) and informal value transfer systems (IVTS) like hawalas.

Israeli asset-seizure orders and blockchain-analytics reports indicate that, in the year preceding the attacks of 7 October 2023, Hezbollah, alongside Hamas and PIJ, raised funds via cryptocurrencies. During this period, Hezbollah is reported to have received roughly US$3.7 million. The groups may also have routed funds between each other's crypto wallets; PIJ and Hezbollah alone are thought to have exchanged up to US$12 million in cryptocurrency since 2021.

After the 2023–2025 war with Israel, Nicholas Blanford of the Atlantic Council think tank, stated that Hezbollah is faced with a multifaceted crisis like none it had seen in the past, with its efforts to reconstitute itself being hampered by access to long-term finances. The strengthened national government, again in charge of reconstruction, stated that the much needed financial aid from foreign donors is conditioned on establishing a state monopoly on arms, which is still in part resisted by Hezbollah. This follows a statement from May 2025 by the US State Department conditioning Washington's support of sustainable reconstruction on Hezbollah "laying down their arms."

Starting in February 2025 and following Israeli threats, Lebanon's government barred commercial flights between Beirut and Tehran, making it harder to smuggle funds from Iran. Israel's military claimed that Hezbollah used to bring in cash from Iran using civilian aircraft, and threatened to take action to stop flights. The IDF declared on 25 June 2025 that it had killed an Iranian official in charge of money transfers from Iran to armed groups in the region, after also assassinating a south Lebanese middleman whose currency exchange firm allegedly helped funnel some of this money to Hezbollah.

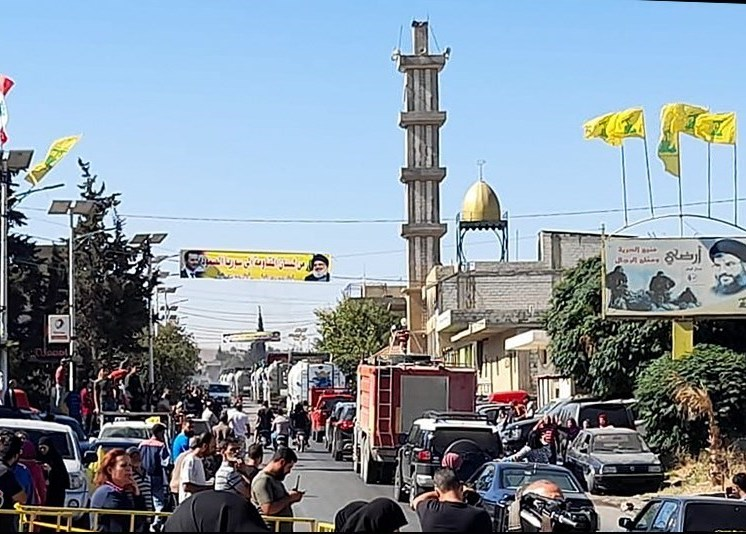
Arrival of fuel from Iran to Lebanon in September 2021

During the September 2021 fuel shortage, Hezbollah received a convoy of 80 tankers carrying oil/diesel fuel from Iran.

On 20 August 2026, the US imposed further sanctions on Hezbollah, including redesignating the group for what the U.S. Treasury Department described as its “service to the Iranian regime under the command of Iran’s Islamic Revolutionary Guard Corps-Qods Force (IRGC-QF)”. Ten individuals whom the U.S. accused of operating a network that smuggled cash to Hezbollah, also through couriers travelling between Iran, Turkey, the United Arab Emirates and Lebanon were also targeted. According to the U.S. Treasury, the network had moved hundreds of millions of dollars to Hezbollah and helped it get foreign currency outside the banking system.

== Attacks on Hezbollah leaders ==
Hezbollah has also been the target of bomb attacks and kidnappings. These include:

- In the 1985 Beirut car bombing, Shia cleric Mohammad Hussein Fadlallah, alleged by some to be the "spiritual mentor" of Hezbollah, was targeted, but the assassination attempt failed.
- On 28 July 1989, Israeli commandos kidnapped Sheikh Abdel Karim Obeid, the leader of Hezbollah. This action led to the adoption of UN Security Council resolution 638, which condemned all hostage takings by all sides.
- On 16 February 1992, Israeli helicopters attacked a motorcade in southern Lebanon, killing the Hezbollah leader Abbas al-Musawi, his wife, son, and four others.
- On 31 March 1995, Rida Yasin, also known as Abu Ali, was killed by a single rocket fired from an Israeli helicopter while in a car near Derdghaya in the Israeli security zone 10 km east of Tyre. Yasin was a senior military commander in southern Lebanon. His companion in the car was also killed. An Israeli civilian was killed and fifteen wounded in the retaliatory rocket fire.
- On 12 February 2008, Imad Mughniyeh was killed by a car bomb in Damascus, Syria.
- On 3 December 2013, senior military commander Hassan al-Laqis was shot outside his home, 3 kilometres (2 mi) southwest of Beirut. He died a few hours later on 4 December.
- On 18 January 2015, a group of Hezbollah fighters was targeted in Quneitra, with the Al-Nusra Front claiming responsibility. In this attack, for which Israel was also accused, Jihad Mughniyeh, son of Imad Mughniyeh, five other members of Hezbollah and an Iranian general of Quds Force, Mohammad Ali Allahdadi, were killed.
- On 10 May 2016, an explosion near Damascus International Airport killed top military commander Mustafa Badreddine. Lebanese media sources attributed the attack to an Israeli airstrike. Hezbollah attributed the attack to Syrian opposition.
- On 30 July 2024, an Israeli air strike in Beirut killed Hezbollah senior commander, a founding member of Hezbollah's armed wing, Fuad Shukr.
- On 20 September 2024, Ibrahim Aqil, a senior commander in the group's elite Redwan Force, was killed in Israeli strike on Beirut.
- On 27 September 2024, an airstrike by the Israeli Air Force in Dahieh killed secretary general Hassan Nasrallah, the Hezbollah's supreme leader. Ali Karaki, Hezbollah's commander of the southern front since 1982, was killed in the same Israeli airstrike alongside Nasrallah.
- On 1 October 2024, an airstrike by the Israeli Air Force in Dahieh killed Muhammad Jafar Qasir, a high-ranking member, widely recognised for his role in managing the group's financial and logistical networks.
- On 4 October 2024, an Israeli air strike on the southern suburbs of Beirut killed Head of Hezbollah's Executive Council, Hashem Safieddine, likely successor of Nasrallah as Hezbollah's next leader.
- On 17 November 2024, Hezbollah's media relations chief, Mohammad Afif, was killed in an Israeli airstrike on the Syrian Ba'ath Party headquarters in Beirut.
- On 3 December 2024, An Israeli airstrike on a car near Damascus killed Salman Jumaa, a senior Hezbollah figure responsible for liaising with the Syrian army.
- On 1 April 2025, Hassan Bdeir, known as ‘Hajj Rabih,’ a key figure in the Hezbollah's structure related to the Palestinian cause, and his son, Ali Bdeir, both were killed during the Israeli strike on the southern suburbs of Beirut.

== Targeting policy ==
After the attacks on 11 September 2001 in the US, Hezbollah condemned al-Qaeda for targeting civilians in the World Trade Center, but remained silent on the attack on The Pentagon. Hezbollah also denounced the massacres in Algeria by Armed Islamic Group, Al-Gama'a al-Islamiyya attacks on tourists in Egypt, the murder of Nick Berg, and ISIL attacks in Paris.

Although Hezbollah has denounced certain attacks on civilians, some people accuse the organisation of the bombing of an Argentine synagogue in 1994. Argentine prosecutor Alberto Nisman, Marcelo Martinez Burgos, and their "staff of some 45 people" said that Hezbollah and their contacts in Iran were responsible for the 1994 bombing of a Jewish cultural centre in Argentina, in which "[e]ighty-five people were killed and more than 200 others injured".

In August 2012, the United States State Department's counter-terrorism coordinator Daniel Benjamin said that Hezbollah "is not constrained by concerns about collateral damage or political fallout that could result from conducting operations there [in Europe]".

== Foreign relations ==
Hezbollah has close relations with Iran. It also had ties with the leadership in Ba'athist Syria, specifically President Hafez al-Assad supported it, until his death in 2000. It was also a close ally of his son Bashar al-Assad, and its leader pledged support to the embattled Syrian leader. Although Hezbollah and Hamas are not organisationally linked, Hezbollah provides military training as well as financial and moral support to the Sunni Palestinian group. Furthermore, Hezbollah was a strong supporter of the Second Intifada.

US and Israeli counter-terrorism officials claim that Hezbollah has (or had) links to Al Qaeda, although Hezbollah's leaders deny these allegations. Also, some al-Qaeda leaders, like Abu Musab al-Zarqawi and Wahhabi clerics, consider Hezbollah to be heretics. But United States intelligence officials speculate that there has been contact between Hezbollah and low-level al-Qaeda figures who fled Afghanistan for Lebanon. However, Michel Samaha, Lebanon's former minister of information, has said that Hezbollah has been an important ally of the government in the war against terrorist groups, and described the "US attempt to link Hezbollah to al-Qaeda" to be "astonishing".

In April 2025, a multinational investigation involving Spain, France, Germany, and the United Kingdom uncovered a Hezbollah logistics network operating in Europe. Authorities arrested multiple individuals connected to the procurement of drone components intended for explosive-laden UAVs. The parts matched those used by Hezbollah in attacks on Israel, highlighting the group's international supply chain and ongoing drone development efforts.

=== Public opinion ===
As of 2024, Hezbollah's support within Lebanon is limited, especially after being blamed for the 2020 Beirut port explosion and the obstruction of accountability efforts. According to a 2024 Arab Barometer survey, 55% of Lebanese have "no trust at all" in the group. Support remains concentrated primarily among the Shiite population.

According to Michel Samaha, Lebanon's Minister of Information, Hezbollah is seen as "a legitimate resistance organisation that has defended its land against the Israeli occupying force, and consistently stood up to the Israeli army". Samaha was sentenced for smuggling explosives to carry out terrorist attacks in Lebanon with the help of the Syrian regime.

According to a survey released by the "Beirut Centre for Research and Information", of 800 citizens polled between 24 and 26 July 2006, during the 2006 Lebanon War, "showed 87% support for Hizbullah's [sic] retaliatory attacks on northern Israel". a rise of 29% from a similar poll conducted in February. More striking, however, was the level of support for Hezbollah's resistance from Sunni communities. "Eighty percent of Christians polled supported Hizbullah [sic] along with 80% of Druze and 89% of Sunnis."

In a poll of Lebanese adults taken in 2004, 6% of respondents gave unqualified support to the statement "Hezbollah should be disarmed". 41% reported unqualified disagreement. A poll of Gaza Strip and West Bank residents indicated that 79.6% had "a very good view" of Hezbollah, and most of the remainder had a "good view". Polls of Jordanian adults in December 2005 and June 2006 showed that 63.9% and 63.3%, respectively, considered Hezbollah to be a legitimate resistance organisation. In the December 2005 poll, only 6% of Jordanian adults considered Hezbollah to be terrorist.

A July 2006 USA Today/Gallup poll found that 83% of the 1,005 US citizens polled blamed Hezbollah, at least in part, for the 2006 Lebanon War, compared to 66% who blamed Israel to some degree. Additionally, 76% disapproved of the military action Hezbollah took in Israel, compared to 38% who disapproved of Israel's military action in Lebanon. A poll in August 2006 by ABC News and The Washington Post found that 68% of the 1,002 US citizens blamed Hezbollah, at least in part, for the civilian casualties in Lebanon during the 2006 Lebanon War, compared to 31% who blamed Israel to some degree. Another August 2006 poll by CNN showed that 69% of the 1,047 US citizens believed that Hezbollah is unfriendly towards, or an enemy of, the United States.

In 2010, a survey of Muslims in Lebanon showed that 94% of Lebanese Shia supported Hezbollah, while 84% of the Sunni Muslims held an unfavourable opinion of the group.

Around 2012, some public opinion has started to turn against Hezbollah for their support of Syrian President Assad's attacks on the opposition movement in Syria. Crowds in Cairo shouted out against Iran and Hezbollah, at a public speech by Hamas President Ismail Haniyeh in February 2012, when Hamas changed its support to the Syrian opposition.

==== View of Hezbollah ====
A November 2020 poll in Lebanon performed by the pro-Israel, US Washington Institute for Near East Policy declared that support for Hezbollah is declining significantly. Below is a table of the results of their polls.

Religion	View (%)				
Religion	Very positive	Somewhat positive	Somewhat negative	Very negative	Unsure
Christian	6	10	23	59	2
Shia	66	23	10	2	0
Sunni	2	6	32	60	0

=== Designation as a terrorist organisation or resistance movement ===
Map of countries that designate Hezbollah as a terrorist organisation as of 2023

Hezbollah's status as a legitimate political party, a terrorist group, a resistance movement, or some combination thereof is a contentious issue. As of April 2026, Hezbollah or its military wing are considered terrorist organisations by at least 28 countries, as well as by the European Union and since 2017 by most member states of the Arab League, with the exception of Iraq and Lebanon, where Hezbollah is the most powerful political party. In June 2024, the Arab League leadership has announced that it no longer views Hezbollah as a terrorist organisation.

There is a "wide difference" between Western and Arab perception of Hezbollah. Several Western countries officially classify Hezbollah or its external security wing as a terrorist organisation, and some of their violent acts have been described as terrorist attacks. However, throughout most of the Arab and Muslim worlds, Hezbollah is referred to as a resistance movement, engaged in national defence. Even within Lebanon, sometimes Hezbollah's status as either a "militia" or "national resistance" has been contentious. In Lebanon, although not universally supported, Hezbollah is widely seen as a legitimate national resistance organisation defending Lebanon, and has been described by the Lebanese information minister as an important ally in fighting terrorist groups.

The United Nations Security Council has never listed Hezbollah as a terrorist organisation under its sanctions list, although some of its members have done so individually. The United Kingdom listed Hezbollah's military wing as a terrorist organisation until May 2019 when the entire organisation was proscribed, and the United States lists the entire group as such. Russia has considered Hezbollah a legitimate sociopolitical organisation, and the People's Republic of China remains neutral and maintains contacts with Hezbollah. The European Union (EU) has banned only Hezbollah's military wing.

The following entities have listed Hezbollah as a terror group:
Country	Listing	Ref
Argentina	Entire organisation	
Australia	Entire organisation	
Austria	Entire organisation	
Bahrain	Entire organisation	
Canada	Entire organisation	
Colombia	Entire organisation	
Costa Rica	Entire organisation	
Czech Republic	Entire organisation	
Ecuador	Entire organisation	
Estonia	Entire organisation	
European Union	Hezbollah's military wing	
France	Hezbollah's military wing, France considers the political wing as a legitimate sociopolitical organisation	
Germany	Entire organisation	
Gulf Cooperation Council	Entire organisation	
Guatemala	Entire organisation	
Honduras	Entire organisation	
Israel	Entire organisation	
Kosovo	Hezbollah's military wing	
Lithuania	Entire organisation	
Netherlands	Entire organisation	
New Zealand	Hezbollah's military wing Al-Muqawama al-Islamiyya, since 2010	
Paraguay	Entire organisation	
Serbia	Entire organisation	
Slovenia	Entire organisation	
Trinidad and Tobago	Entire organisation	
Ukraine	Hezbollah's military wing	
United Arab Emirates	Entire organisation	
United Kingdom	Entire organisation	
United States	Entire organisation	

The following entities have listed Hezbollah as a terror group in the past:
Arab League	Entire organisation

The following entities do not consider Hezbollah a terror organisation:
Algeria	Entire organisation
China	Maintains contact with Hezbollah
Cuba	Hezbollah allegedly operates a base in Cuba
Iran	
North Korea	Allegedly supports Hezbollah. Considers Hezbollah an organisation of Lebanese patriotic forces
Russia	Considers Hezbollah a legitimate sociopolitical organisation

Hezbollah has not been designated a terrorist organisation, nor is its activities supported:
Iraq	The federal government of Iraq had previously listed it and the Houthi movement as terrorist organisations, but later withdrew the designation, calling it a mistake. On 15 July 2026, Iraq sanctioned Hezbollah and its affiliates.
Syria	After the fall of the Assad regime in 2024, clashes broke out between the Syrian transitional government and Hezbollah in the border region.

==== In the Western world ====
The United States Department of State has designated Hezbollah a terrorist organisation since 1995. The group remains on Foreign Terrorist Organisation and Specially Designated Terrorist lists. According to the Congressional Research Service, "The US government holds Hezbollah responsible for...attacks and hostage takings targeting US citizens in Lebanon during the 1980s, including the bombing of the US Embassy in Beirut in April 1983 and the bombing of the US Marine barracks in October 1983, which together killed 258 US citizens. Hezbollah's operations outside of Lebanon, including its participation in bombings of Israeli and Jewish targets in Argentina during the 1990s and...training and liaison activities with Shiite insurgents in Iraq, have cemented the organisation's reputation among U.S. policy makers as a capable and deadly adversary with potential global reach." In 2015, the US Director of National Intelligence removed Hezbollah from the list of "active terrorist threats" while Hezbollah remained designated as terrorist by the US, and Hezbollah officials were sanctioned for their role in facilitating military activity in the Syrian Civil War. In May 2025, senior Hezbollah officials and financial facilitators around new sanctions, were targeted by the US, for their role in coordinating financial transfers to the Iran-backed group. In April 2026, US ambassador to Lebanon Michel Issa stated that Lebanon's formal designation of Hezbollah as a terrorist organisation was a prerequisite for US diplomatic intervention to end the war with Israel.

The UK was the first government to attempt to make a distinction between Hezbollah's political and military wings, declaring the latter a terrorist group in 2008. In 2019, the UK Government proscribed the entirety of Hezbollah as an organisation due to the difficulties in distinguishing between the political and military wings, as a way of limiting its influence in the UK. In 2012, British Foreign Minister William Hague "urged the EU to place Hezbollah's military wing on its list of terrorist organisations". The US urged the EU to classify Hezbollah as a terrorist organisation. In light of findings implicating Hezbollah in the 2012 Burgas bus bombing, Bulgaria, there was discussion within the EU to label Hezbollah's military wing as a terrorist group. In 2013, the EU agreed to blacklist Hezbollah's military wing over its role in the Syrian conflict. The EU, France, and New Zealand have proscribed Hezbollah's military wing, but do not list Hezbollah as a whole as a terrorist organisation. During the Israeli occupation of southern Lebanon, French Prime Minister Lionel Jospin stated that "France condemns Hezbollah's attacks, and all types of terrorist attacks which may be carried out against soldiers, or possibly Israel's civilian population." Italian Foreign Minister Massimo D'Alema differentiated the wings of Hezbollah: "Apart from their well-known terrorist activities, they also have political standing and are socially engaged." Germany does not maintain its list, having chosen to adopt the EU list. However, German officials have indicated they would support designating Hezbollah a terrorist organisation. The Netherlands regards Hezbollah as terrorist labelling it as such in reports of its intelligence and security service and in official answers by its Foreign Minister. Serbia, which designated Iran-backed Hezbollah entirely as a terrorist organisation, fully implement measures to restrict Hezbollah's operations and financial activities.

In the midst of the 2006 conflict between Hezbollah and Israel, Russia's government declined to include Hezbollah in a list of terrorist organisations stating that it lists only organisations which represent "the greatest threat to the security of our country". Prior to the release of the list, Russian Defence Minister Sergei Ivanov called "on Hezbollah to stop resorting to any terrorist methods, including attacking neighboring states". Argentine prosecutors hold Hezbollah, and its financial supporters in Iran, responsible for the 1994 AMIA Bombing of a Jewish cultural centre, described as "the worst terrorist attack on Argentine soil", in which "85 people were killed and more than 200 others injured". The GCC, Canada, Israel, and Australia have classified Hezbollah as a terrorist organisation.

The UN does not maintain a terrorist list, however, it has made repeated calls for Hezbollah to disarm and accused the group of destabilising the region and causing harm to Lebanese civilians. Human rights organisations Amnesty International and Human Rights Watch have accused Hezbollah of committing war crimes against Israeli civilians.

==== In the Arab and Muslim world ====
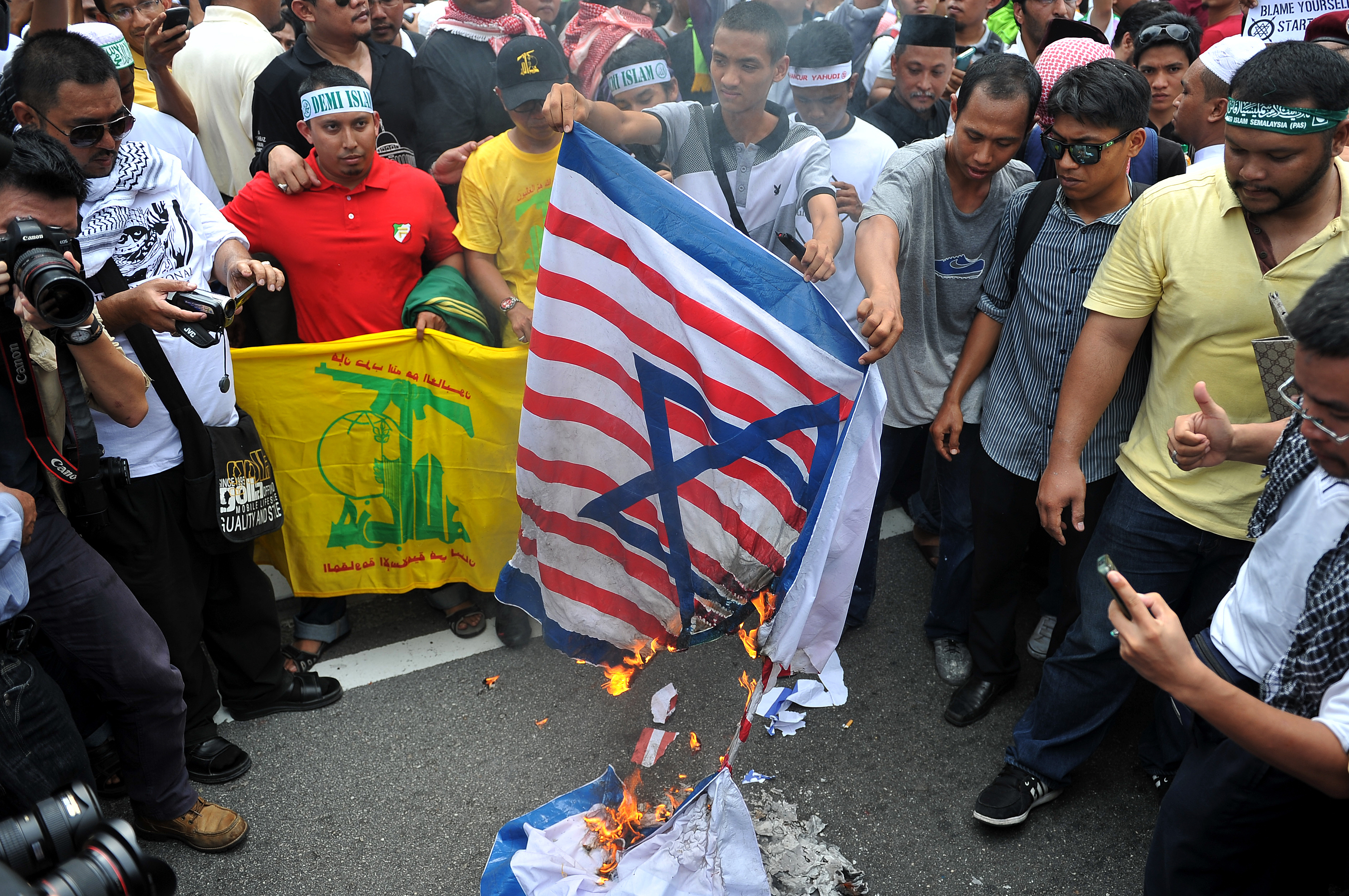
Protesters in Kuala Lumpur, Malaysia, with a Hezbollah flag in September 2012

In 2006, Hezbollah was regarded as a legitimate resistance movement throughout most of the Arab and Muslim world. Furthermore, most of the Sunni Arab world sees Hezbollah as an agent of Iranian influence, and therefore, would like to see their power in Lebanon diminished. Egypt, Jordan, and Saudi Arabia have condemned Hezbollah's actions, saying that "the Arabs and Muslims can't afford to allow an irresponsible and adventurous organisation like Hezbollah to drag the region to war" and calling it "dangerous adventurism".

After an alleged 2009 Hezbollah plot in Egypt, the Egyptian regime of Hosni Mubarak officially classified Hezbollah as a terrorist group. Following the 2012 Presidential elections the new government recognised Hezbollah as a "real political and military force" in Lebanon. The Egyptian ambassador to Lebanon, Ashraf Hamdy, stated that, "Resistance in the sense of defending Lebanese territory ... That's their primary role. We ... think that as a resistance movement they have done a good job to keep on defending Lebanese territory and trying to regain land occupied by Israel is legal and legitimate."

During the Bahraini uprising, Bahrain foreign minister Khalid ibn Ahmad Al Khalifah labelled Hezbollah a terrorist group and accused them of supporting the protesters. On 10 April 2013, Bahrain blacklisted Hezbollah as a terrorist group, being the first Arab state in this regard.

While Hezbollah has supported popular uprisings in Egypt, Yemen, Bahrain and Tunisia, Hezbollah publicly sided with Iran and Syria during the 2011 Syrian uprising. This position has prompted criticism from anti-government Syrians. As Hezbollah supported other movements in the context of the Arab Spring, anti-government Syrians have stated that they feel "betrayed" by a double standard allegedly applied by the movement. Following Hezbollah's aid in Assad government's victory in Qusayr, anti-Hezbollah editorials began regularly appearing in the Arabic media and anti-Hezbollah graffiti has been seen in southern Lebanon.

In March 2016, the GCC designated Hezbollah as a terrorist organisation due to its alleged attempts to undermine GCC states, and Arab League followed the move, with reservation by Iraq and Lebanon. In the summit, Lebanese Foreign Minister Gebran Bassil said that "Hezbollah enjoys wide representation and is an integral faction of the Lebanese community", while Iraqi Foreign Minister Ibrahim al-Jaafari said PMF and Hezbollah "have preserved Arab dignity" and those who accuse them of being terrorists are terrorists themselves. The Saudi delegation walked out of the meeting. Israel's Prime Minister Benjamin Netanyahu called the step, "'important' and 'even amazing'".

A day before the move by the Arab League, Hezbollah leader Nasrallah said that, "Saudi Arabia is angry with Hezbollah since it is daring to say what only a few others dare to say against its royal family."

In 2020, a German security contractor accused Qatar of financing Hezbollah. In September 2021, U.S' Secretary of State, Antony Blinken commended the combined efforts taken by the United States and the Government of Qatar against Hezbollah financial network which involved the abuse of international financial system by using global networks of financiers and front companies to spread terrorism. In July 2022, Qatar participated in a 30-nation meeting led by the United States to counter Hezbollah, according to Axios.

In June 2024, the Arab League Assistant Secretary-General Hossam Zaki has announced that the Arab League no longer considers Hezbollah a terrorist organisation.

==== In Lebanon ====
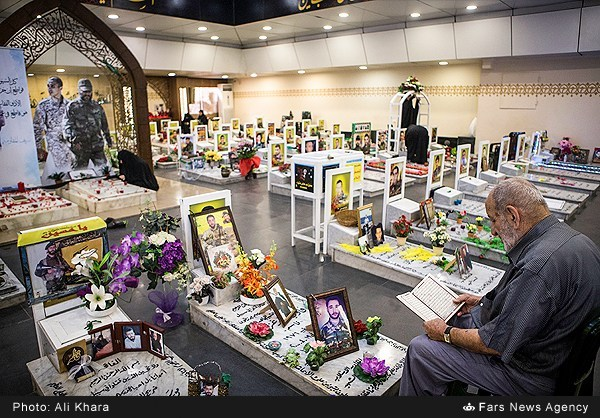
Graves of killed Hezbollah members at a mausoleum in Beirut

In an interview during the 2006 Lebanon War, then-President Emile Lahoud stated, "Hezbollah enjoys utmost prestige in Lebanon, because it freed our country ... even though it is very small, it stands up to Israel." Following the 2006 War, other Lebanese including members of the government were resentful of the large damage sustained by the country and saw Hezbollah's actions as unjustified "dangerous adventurism" rather than legitimate resistance. They accused Hezbollah of acting on behalf of Iran and Syria. An official of the Future Movement, part of the March 14 Alliance, warned that Hezbollah "has all the characteristics of a terrorist party", and that Hezbollah is moving Lebanon toward the Iranian Islamic system of government.

In August 2008, Lebanon's cabinet completed a policy statement which recognised "the right of Lebanon's people, army, and resistance to liberate the Israeli-occupied Shebaa Farms, Kafar Shuba Hills, and the Lebanese section of Ghajar village, and defend the country using all legal and possible means".

Gebran Tueni, a late conservative Orthodox Christian editor of an-Nahar, referred to Hezbollah as an "Iranian import" and said "they have nothing to do with Arab civilisation". Tuení believed that Hezbollah's evolution is cosmetic, concealing a sinister long-term strategy to Islamicise Lebanon and lead it into a ruinous war with Israel.

By 2017, a poll showed that 62% of Lebanese Christians believed that Hezbollah was doing a "better job than anyone else in defending Lebanese interests in the region, and they trust it more than other social institutions".

==== Scholarly views ====
Academics specialising in a wide variety of the social sciences believe that Hezbollah is an example of an Islamic terrorist organisation. Such scholars and research institutes include the following:

- Walid Phares, Lebanese-born terrorism scholar and member of the Lebanese Kataeb Party
- Mark LeVine, US historian
- Avraham Sela, Israeli historian
- Robert S. Wistrich, Israeli historian
- Eyal Zisser, Israeli historian
- Siamak Khatami, Iranian scholar
- Rohan Gunaratna, Singaporean scholar
- Neeru Gaba, Australian scholar
- Tore Bjørgo, Norwegian scholar
- Magnus Norell, of the European Foundation for Democracy
- Anthony Cordesman, of the US Center for Strategic and International Studies
- Center for American Progress
- United States Institute of Peace

=== Views of foreign legislators ===
J. Gresham Barrett brought up legislation in the US House of Representatives which, among other things, referred to Hezbollah as a terrorist organisation. Congress members Tom Lantos, Jim Saxton, Thad McCotter, Chris Shays, Charles Boustany, Alcee Hastings, and Robert Wexler referred to Hezbollah as a terrorist organisation in their speeches supporting the legislation. Shortly before a speech by Iraqi Prime Minister Nouri al-Maliki, U.S. Congressman Dennis Hastert said, "He [Maliki] denounces terrorism, and I have to take him at his word. Hezbollah is a terrorist organisation."

In 2011, a bipartisan group of members of US Congress introduced the Hezbollah Anti-Terrorism Act. The act ensures that no US aid to Lebanon will enter the hands of Hezbollah. On the day of the act's introduction, Congressman Darrell Issa said, "Hezbollah is a terrorist group and a cancer on Lebanon. The Hezbollah Anti-Terrorism Act surgically targets this cancer and will strengthen the position of Lebanese who oppose Hezbollah."

In a Sky News interview during the 2006 Lebanon war, British MP George Galloway said that Hezbollah is "not a terrorist organisation".

Former Swiss member of parliament, Jean Ziegler, said in 2006: "I refuse to describe Hezbollah as a terrorist group. It is a national movement of resistance."

== Electoral performance ==
=== Parliament ===
Election	Leading candidate	Votes	%	Seats	+/–	Government
1992	Hassan Nasrallah	—	— (#1)	8 / 128	New	Opposition
1996	Hassan Nasrallah	—	— (#3)	7 / 128	1	Opposition
2000	Hassan Nasrallah	—	— (#3)	10 / 128	3	Opposition
2005	Hassan Nasrallah	—	— (#4)	14 / 128	4	Coalition
2009	Hassan Nasrallah	—	— (#4)	13 / 128	1	Coalition
2018	Hassan Nasrallah	289,174	16.44 (#5)	12 / 128	1	Coalition
2022	Hassan Nasrallah	335,466	18.56 (#3)	15 / 128	3	Coalition

== See also ==
- Flag of Hezbollah
- Military equipment of Hezbollah
- Terrorism in Lebanon
- Jihad al-Bina
- Mleeta museum
- Jaysh al-Mahdi (Iraq)
- Al-Ashtar Brigades (Bahrain)
- Liwa Assad Allah (Syria)
- Hezbollah al-Hejaz (Saudi Arabia)
- Harakah al-Sabireen (Palestine)
- Islamic Front for the Liberation of Bahrain
- Islamic Movement (Nigeria)
- Hezbollah Movement in Iraq
  - Kata'ib Hezbollah
  - Harakah Hezbollah al-Nujaba
  - Kata'ib Sayyid al-Shuhada
  - Badr Organization
  - Kata'ib al-Imam Ali
  - Unit 121
  - Mahmoud Qamati

== Sources ==
- Al-Aloosy, Massaab (2020). The Changing Ideology of Hezbollah. Springer International Publishing.
- Blanford, Nicholas; Salim, Arab (23 June 2013). "Why Hezbollah has openly joined the Syrian fight". The Christian Science Monitor.
- Avon, Dominique; Khatchadourian, Anaïs-Trissa (2012). Hezbollah: A History of the "Party of God". Harvard University Press. ISBN 978-0-674-07031-8.
- Daher, Aurélie (2019). Hezbollah: Mobilization and Power. Oxford University Press. ISBN 978-0-190-09263-4.
- Dionigi, Filippo (2014). Hezbollah, Islamist Politics, and International Society. Springer. ISBN 978-1-137-40302-5.
- Farida, Mariam (2019). Religion and Hezbollah: Political Ideology and Legitimacy. Routledge. ISBN 978-1-000-45857-2.
- Norton, Augustus Richard (2014). Hezbollah: A Short History (2 ed.). Princeton University Press. ISBN 978-1-400-85144-7.
- Saouli, Adham (2018). Hezbollah: Socialisation and its Tragic Ironies. Edinburgh University Press. ISBN 978-1-474-41954-3.
- Worrall, James; Mabon, Simon; Clubb, Gordon (2015). Hezbollah: From Islamic Resistance to Government: From Islamic Resistance to Government. ABC-CLIO. ISBN 978-1-440-83135-5.
- Zirulnick, Ariel (21 December 2012). "In Hezbollah stronghold, Lebanese Christians find respect, stability". The Christian Science Monitor.
- Norton, Augustus R. (2018). Hezbollah: a short history (Updated and expanded third ed.). Princeton University Press. ISBN 9780691180885.
- Ranstorp, Magnus (1997). Hizb'Allah in Lebanon: The Politics of the Western Hostage Crisis. St. Martin's Press. ISBN 978-0-312-16491-1.
- Ranstorp, Magnus (Summer 1998). "The strategy and tactics of Hizballah's current Lebanonization process". Mediterranean Politics. 3 (1): 103–134. doi:10.1080/13629399808414643.
- Tom Najem and Roy C. Amore, Historical Dictionary of Lebanon, Second Edition, Historical Dictionaries of Asia, Oceania, and the Middle East, Rowman & Littlefield Publishers, Lanham, Boulder, New York & London 2021. ISBN 9781538120439, 1538120437
