= Dominique Avon =

French historian

Dominique Avon is a French historian. He is a scholar of Islam and Christianity and a professor at the Religious Sciences Section of the École pratique des hautes études.

== Biography ==
Dominique Avon has a degree in history. He is Director of Studies at the École pratique des hautes études (5th Section, Religious Sciences, Sunni Islam). He was a lecturer at the University of Montpellier Paul Valéry, then Professor of Contemporary History at the Université du Maine (France) (Le Mans). He has taught in Egypt (1992-1994), Lebanon (2004-2005) and the United States (2014).

Director of the IISMM (Institut d'études de l'islam et des sociétés du monde musulman), he has coordinated the HEMED thematic community (“Histoire euro-méditerranéenne”), and co-directed, with John V. Tolan, the IPRA (“Institut du pluralisme religieux et de l'athéisme”). He was also president of the AFHRC (“Association française d'histoire religieuse contemporaine”) between 2011 and 2014.

His research focuses on religion, in particular Islam and Christianity, intellectuals and the history of ideas. He is a member of the GSRL (Unité mixte de recherche 8582).

== Work ==
He has written several books on Catholic religious orders such as the Society of Jesus and the Order of Preachers and on Muslim groups such as the Hezbollah (Hezbollah: A History of the "Party of God", written with Anas-Trissa Khatchadourian).

He is also the author of La Fragilité des clercs ("The Frailty of the Intellectuals", untranslated), an essay in which he analyses the thought of Samuel P. Huntington, Tariq Ramadan, Georges Corm, Alain Besançon and Alain Finkielkraut, and criticizes their perceived warmongering tendencies and inability to reason dispassionately about religious matters. The title is a pun on 1927 book La Trahison des clercs by Julien Benda.

He is the author of La liberté de conscience. Histoire d’une notion et d’un droit (2020) and L’histoire religieuse contemporaine en France (2022).

Hezbollah: A History of the "Party of God", published by Harvard University Press, contains a historical account as well as important primary sources about Hezbollah. While it was praised by John Quinn from The Risky Shift to be "an exceptional dispassionate analysis of Hezbollah’s early and later years", it has been criticized by Publishers Weekly for relying "too heavily on Hezbollah's rhetoric to explain its motives and actions" and by Princeton scholar Samuel Helfont for using "passive constructions" through which "chronology and causality can be blurry".
