= 2009 Hezbollah plot in Egypt =

Failed terrorist attempt

The 2009 Hezbollah plot in Egypt involved the arrest of 49 men by Egyptian authorities in the five months preceding April 2009. Egypt accused them of being Hezbollah agents planning attacks against Israeli and Egyptian targets in the Sinai Peninsula. The arrests led to tensions between the Egyptian government and Hezbollah, as well as between Egypt and Iran.

Tension had been high since Israel's Gaza War. Hezbollah head Hassan Nasrallah had accused Egypt of being a partner to the killing of Palestinians there, saying if it did not open the Rafah crossing it would be considered a "partner in the killing of Palestinians by the IDF."

The plot prompted the Egyptian government to officially designate Hezbollah a "terrorist group".

== Activities ==
In Port Said, a cell was set up to monitor ship activity in the Suez Canal. The cell was to buy a boat as well as set up a fish shop in order to do this.

Reports said the men had planned three major bomb attacks in Taba, popular with Israeli tourists, using explosive belts and car bombs.

== Reaction ==
=== Egyptian ===
Egypt's reaction was hostile. President Hosni Mubarak issued a strong statement denouncing the Lebanese group and its supporters. "They [Hezbollah and Iran] aspire to impose their influence on our Arab world by introducing hostile elements into the region, in efforts to threaten Egypt's national security," Mubarak said. He added, "[W]e will uncover their plot; beware of Egypt's wrath." In addition, the Egyptian newspaper Al-Ahram claimed that Iran, Syria, and Qatar were working to overthrow the Egyptian government.

=== Hezbollah ===
Hezbollah said one of the men was indeed one of their operatives, but that he had been trying to smuggle weapons into Gaza for Hamas. The group said the terror plot claims were "fabricated" to "sully Hezbollah’s image" and that the allegations were retaliation for Hezbollah's comments during Operation Cast Lead.

=== Sudan ===
A Sudanese official claimed rebel groups had collaborated with Hezbollah in smuggling weapons to Egypt. He condemned “any sabotage to a country’s sovereignty under any circumstances”.

== Convictions ==
On April 28, 2010, 26 men were convicted by a State Security court of planning the attacks and given sentences from six months to life imprisonment. Four men were convicted in absentia.

== Escape ==
In the midst of the 2011 Egyptian protests, the cell's ringleader and 21 other Hezbollah suspects escaped from the Wadi El Natrun prison north of Cairo. Some later appeared back in Beirut.

== See also ==
- 2004 Sinai bombings
- 2006 Dahab bombings
