= Southern Pulse =

- Founded: 2004
- Founder: Samuel Logan
- Purpose: Investigative Journalism
- Location: Annapolis, Maryland
- Region served: United States
- Website: Southern Pulse

Southern Pulse is a consultancy and field-based organization focused on energy, politics, business, and security in Latin America. It was founded by the journalist and author Samuel Logan in 2004, and it now has a network of investigators that operate across the Americas.

== Foundation ==
Southern Pulse was founded in 2004 by Samuel Logan, a writer and investigative journalist, as a private human intelligence organization with focus in Latin America. The organization currently based in Annapolis, Maryland.

It has operators in the Latin American countries of Mexico, Chile, El Salvador, Colombia, and Brazil, and seeks "to mitigate risk for public and private sector clients with exposure to political, security, financial, or legal risk in Latin America". Using in-country sources and field contracts, Southern Pulse gathers and produces information on these countries security, energy, politics, and business patterns via news feeds or weekly "pulses".

== See also ==
- InSight Crime
