= Samuel Logan =

American journalist (born 1976)

Samuel Logan (born 9 April 1976) is an investigative journalist and analyst on security, politics, and energy in Latin America.

Logan was born at a Cherry Point military hospital in North Carolina, and has lived in New Orleans, Houston, Camden (SC), Asheville, and Hampden-Sydney (VA), where he attended Hampden-Sydney College from 1994 until 1998. After college, Logan moved to Costa Rica where he worked as a field instructor for the Costa Rica Rain Forest Outward Bound School and traveled extensively through Central America. He then moved to Santiago, Chile to work as a reporter for Business News Americas in 1999 before founding his own company.

After three years in Chile and traveling around South America, Logan returned to the United States in 2002 to attend the International Policy Studies graduate program at the Monterey Institute of International Studies, where he focused on security and development in Brazil.,

Once he completed his graduate studies, Logan returned to Brazil to work for the International Relations and Security Network as a correspondent, eventually becoming the organization's senior writer in Latin America.

With the ISN, Logan has focused on organized crime, black markets, the drug trade, and other matters of Security in Latin America. He is the author of This is for the Mara Salvatrucha: Inside the MS-13, America's Most Violent Gang (Hyperion, 2009).,

Logan is also the founder of Southern Pulse, a human intelligence organization focused on security, politics, energy, and business in Latin America and Evidencity, Inc., an online marketplace for global records retrieval for due diligence, audit and compliance.
