= Imad Salamey =

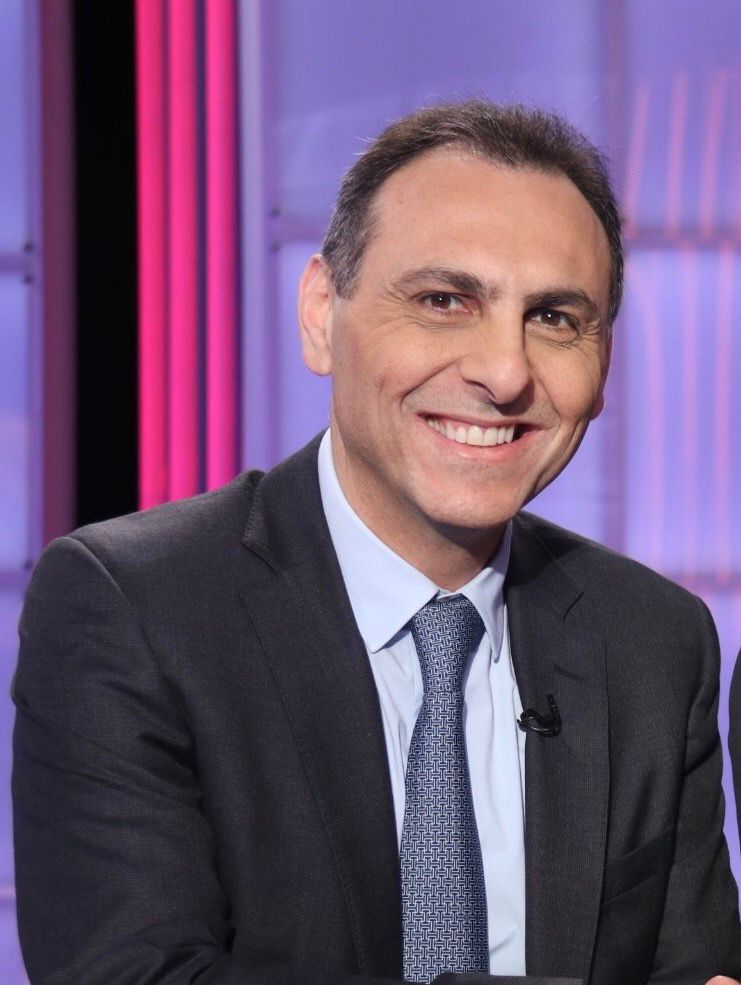
Imad Salamey

Imad Salamey is a Professor of Political Science and International Affairs at the Lebanese American University (LAU). Salamey is a widely published researcher and scholar. Among his works are Philosophy and Contemporary Politics of Communitarianism and The Decline of Nation States after the Arab Spring: the Rise of Communitocracy that examine contemporary communitarian thoughts, identity politics, and patterns of communal mobilizations. His books The Communitarian Nation-State Paradox in Lebanon and The Government and Politics of Lebanon explain the dynamic of Lebanese sectarian politics during conflict and consensus and unravel the role of domestic and international actors. His edited volume on Syria Post-Conflict Power-Sharing Arrangements: Options for Syria provide comparative political governance recovery pathways in a divided society. In his research records are studies and reports that explore power sharing and communitarian politics in the Middle East and North Africa. He is a consultant for various governments and international organizations on issues related to political economy, conflict resolution, communitarian movements, and governance.

== Publications ==
- Saadeh, Reem and Salamey, Imad. 2026. “Mediating Ethnosectarian Conflicts: Lessons from Bosnia-Herzegovina, Lebanon, and Northern Ireland”. International Negotiation, 31(2), 288-307.
- Salamey, Imad and Rahbani Takla. 2023. “Power-Sharing Models for Post-War Syria: Consociational vs. Centripetal Options”. Nationalism and Ethnic Politics 29(2): 179-203.
- Salamey, Imad (2021). "Democracy and Development in the Middle East". In: G. Crawford & A. Abdulai, eds. Research Handbook on Democracy and Development.
- Salamey, Imad (2020). "Hezbollah, Communitarianism, and Anti-Imperialism". In the Encyclopedia of Imperialism and Anti-Imperialism, 2 eds. Cope, Zak and Ness, Immanuel. London: Palgrave Macmillan.
- Salamey, Imad (2019). "Mitigating MENA Communitarian Conflicts through Power-Sharing Options", Orient, 60(2): 43-50.
- Salamey, Imad (2018). "The Communitarian Arab State", James A. Baker III Institute for Public Policy.
- Salamey, Imad; Abu-Nimer, Mohammed, Elie Abouaoun, (2018). Post-Conflict Power-Sharing Agreements: Options for Syria, London: Palgrave Macmillan.
- Salamey, Imad (2017). The Decline of Nation-States after the Arab Spring: the Rise of Communitocracy London: Routledge.
- Salamey, Imad (2016). "The Double Movement & Post-Arab Spring Consociationalism",The Muslim World, 105(3): 187-203.
- Salamey, Imad (2015). "Post-Arab Spring Changes and Challenges". Third World Quarterly, 36(1): 111-129.
- Salamey, Imad (2013). "Mitigating the Resource Curse for Extractive Industry: the Case of Lebanon". Oil, Gas, and Energy Law Intelligence, 11 (3).
- Salamey, Imad and Tabar, Paul (2012). "Democratic Transition and Sectarian Populism: The Case of Lebanon", Contemporary Arab Affairs, 5(4): 37-41.
- Salamey, Imad and Pearson, Frederic (2012). "The collapse of Middle Eastern Authoritarianism: Breaking the Barriers of Fear and Power", Third World Quarterly, 33(5): 931-948.
- Salamey, Imad and Othman, Zanoubia (2011). "Shi'a Revival and Welayat El-Faqih in the Making of Iranian Foreign Policy", Politics, Religion & Ideology, 12(2): 197 - 212.
