= Lebanese society =

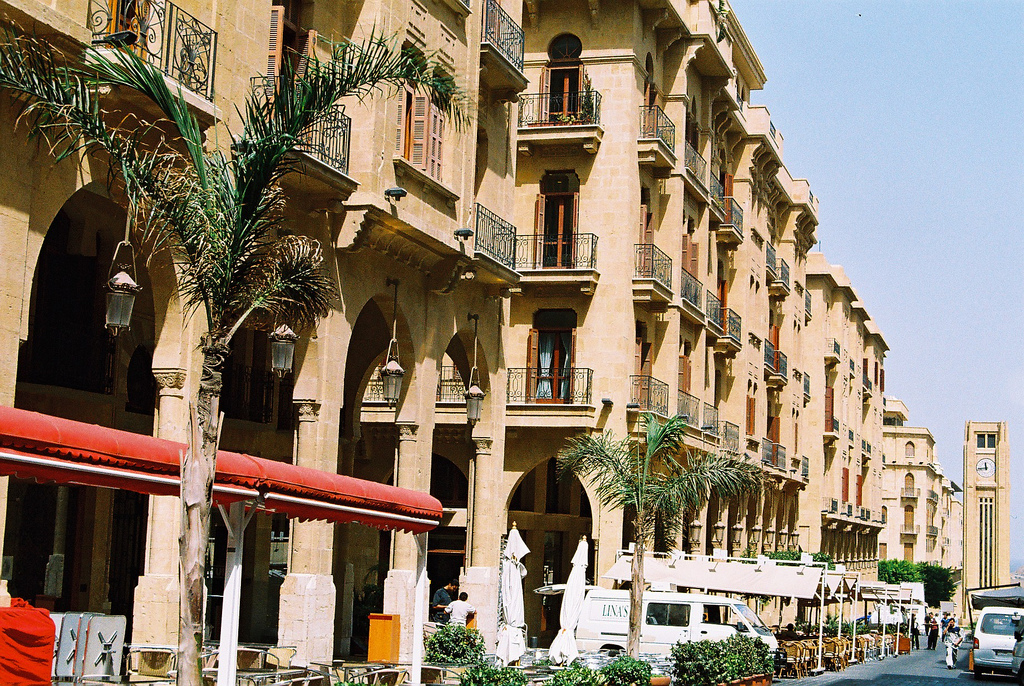
Rue Maarad is a main street in the central district of Beirut

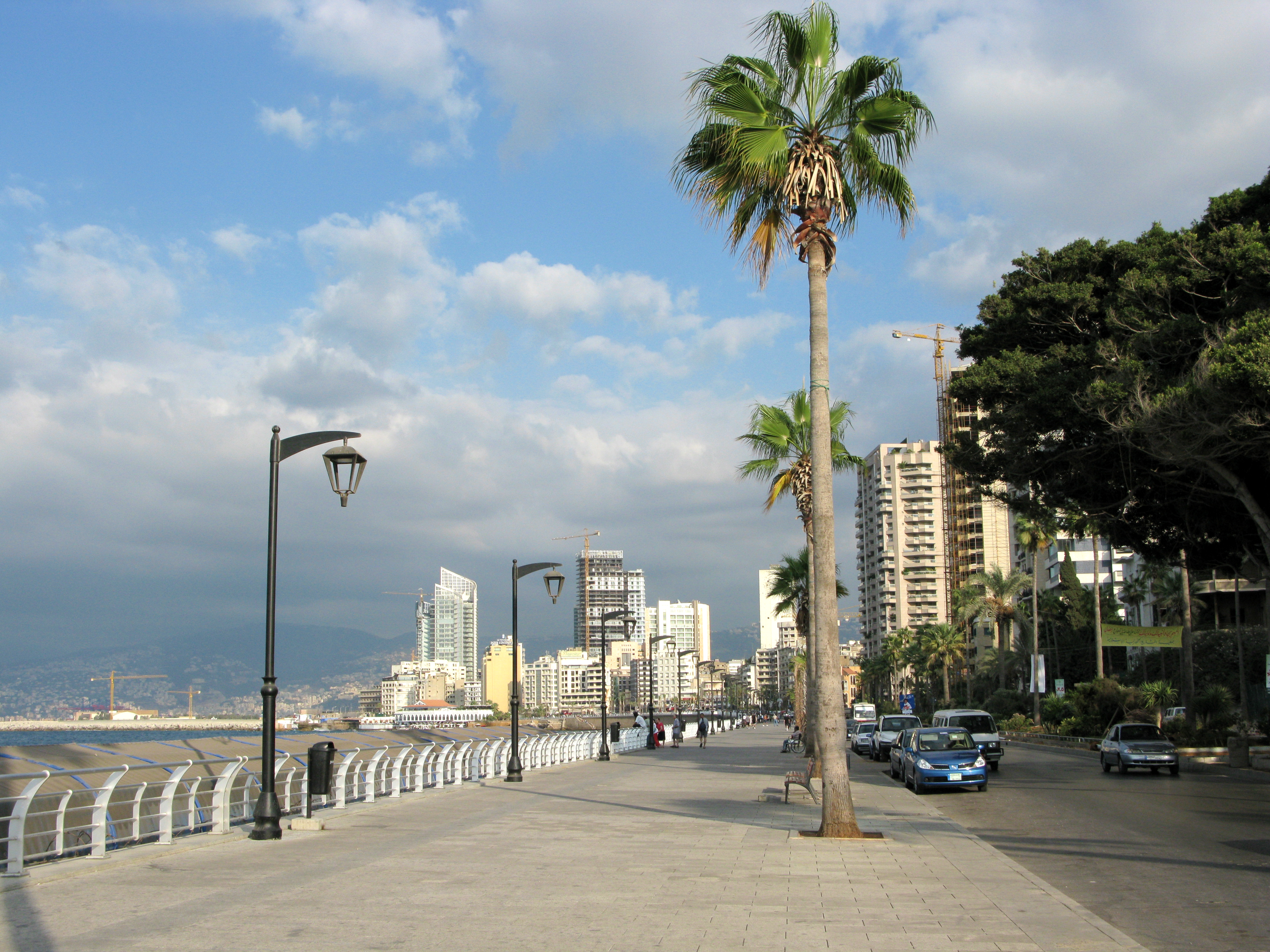
Palm trees at the seafront in Corniche Beirut

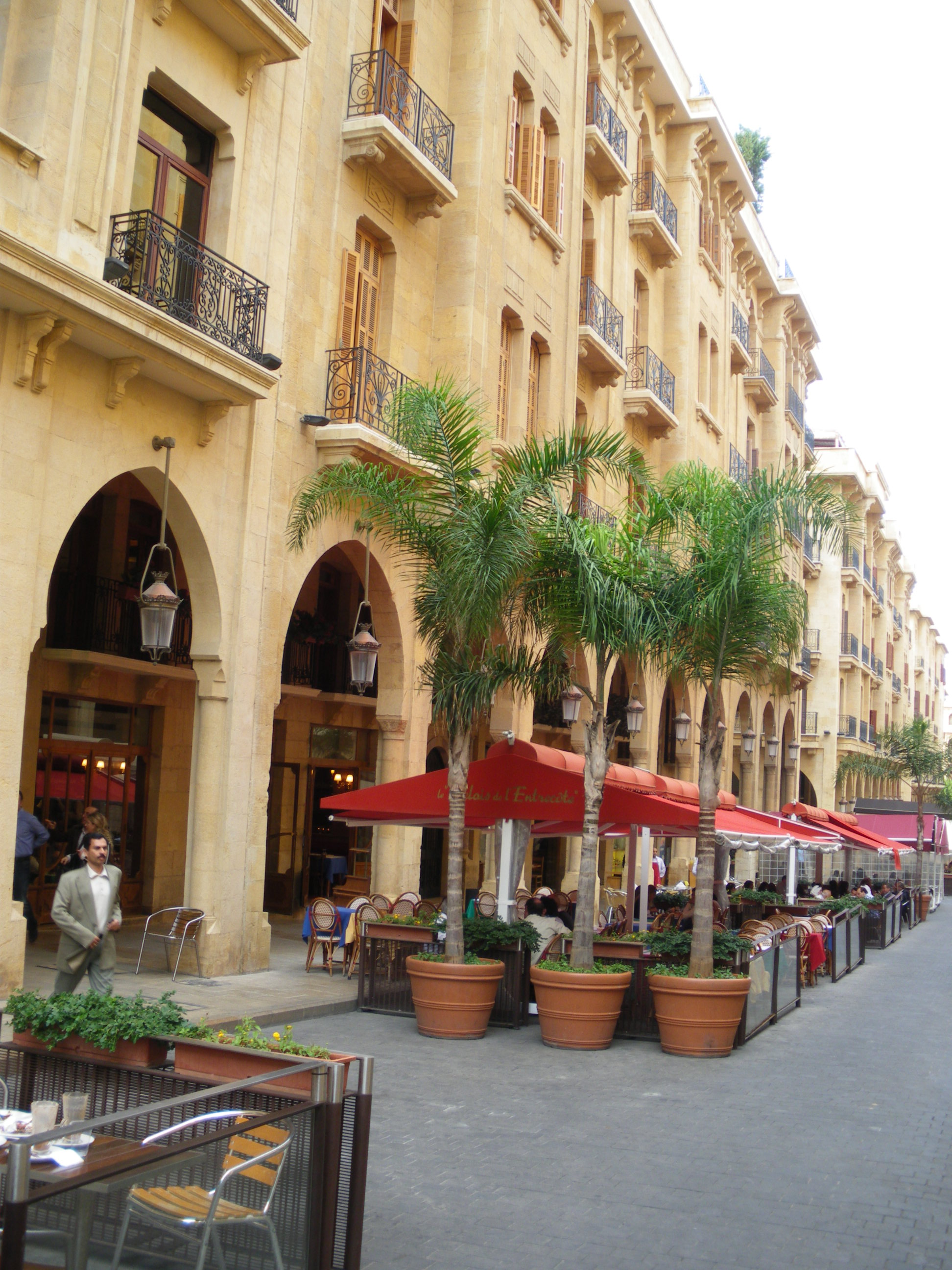
Sidewalk Cafes are a trademark of the BCD

Lebanese society is very modern and similar to certain cultures of Southern Europe as the country is "linked ideologically and culturally to Europe through France, and its uniquely diverse religious composition [create] a rare environment that [is] at once Arab and European". It is often considered as Europe's gateway to Western Asia as well as Asia's gateway to the Western World.

== Lebanese political system ==
The Lebanese system is parliamentary democracy, which implements a special system known as confessionalism. This system is intended to deter sectarian conflict and attempts to fairly represent the demographic distribution of the 18 recognized religious groups in government. High-ranking offices are reserved for members of specific religious groups. The President, for example, has to be a Maronite Christian, the Prime Minister a Sunni Muslim, the Speaker of the Parliament a Shi'a Muslim, the Deputy Prime Minister and the Deputy Speaker of Parliament Eastern Orthodox Christian.

The Druze and Maronite community in Lebanon played an important role in the formation of the modern state of Lebanon in the early 18th century, through a governing and social system known as the "Maronite-Druze dualism" in Mount Lebanon Mutasarrifate.

== Family life ==
Family life is very important in the Lebanese culture. Family functioning is associated with the values of collectivism in the Lebanese society. One person's family functioning is indicative of their individual status and identity. The average household size ranges between 3.9 and 4.9.

=== Kinship ===
Patrilineal kin group is another major unit of identity for the Lebanese. The actual extent of identity through kin groups varies. Large clans are typically more traditional and have political and economic ties to its unit. Instead, extended families are generally the boundaries of which these kin groups separate. The Lebanese household serves as the center of these kin groups. There are little variations in kinship patterns in the rural and urban areas of Lebanon. The value of family loyalty is heavily emphasized within these kin groups. One important expectation of family loyalty is nepotism, where family members are expected to find employment for each other, in order for its family unit to function and survive.

=== Children and parenting ===
Child-rearing practices are characterized by abundant protection imposed on children by parents. Unlike Western societies, parental control does not stop at the age of 18; instead, it continues for as long as the child lives in the parents' residence or until the child marries.

In some villages, when the first boy has been given birth to, the married couple is no longer addressed by their given names alone but is also called by the name of their son – "father of x" and "mother of x".

== Gender roles ==
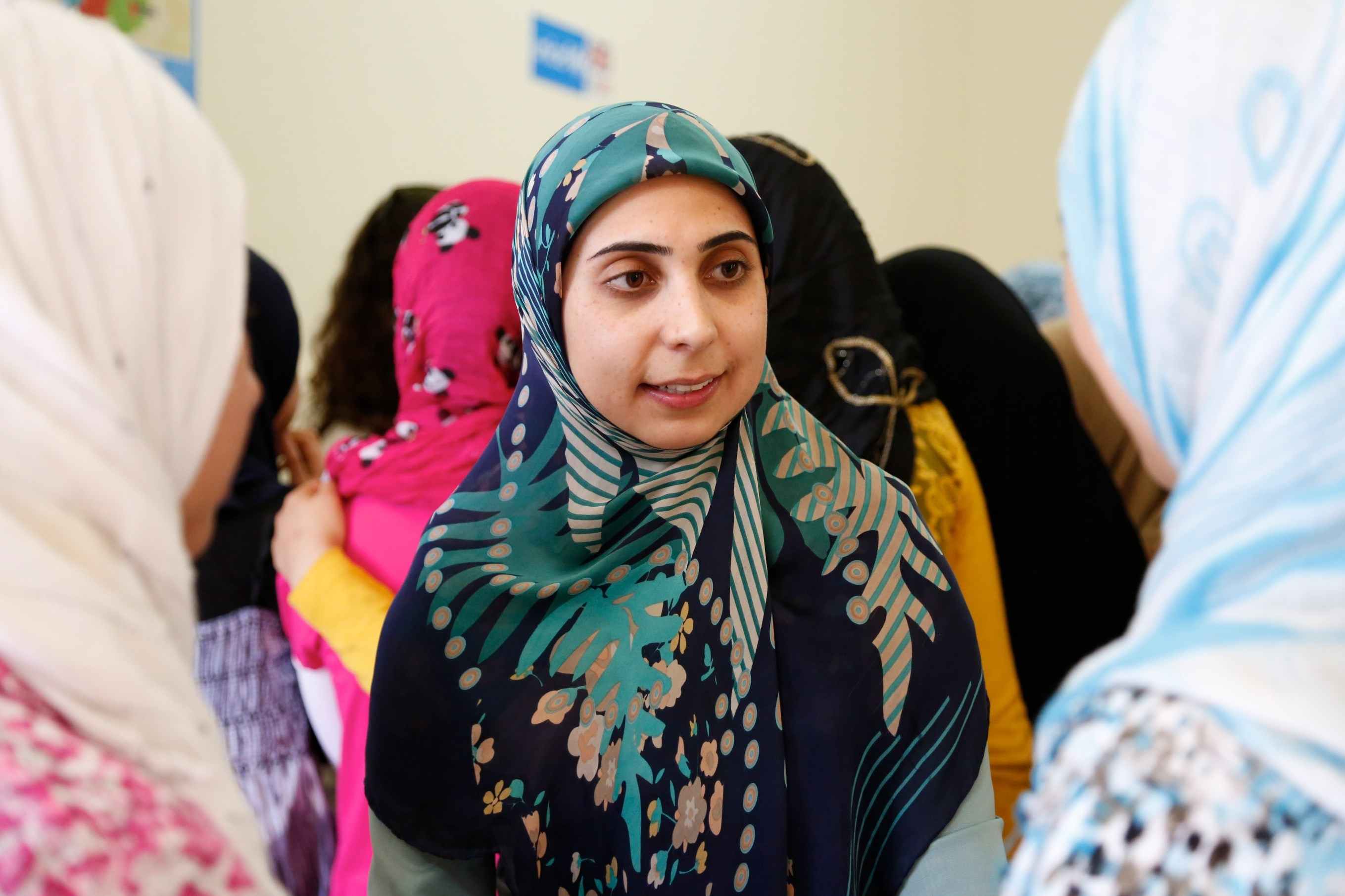
A Lebanese woman talks to two Syrian refugee girls at an information session about gender-based violence and early marriage in southern Lebanon

Notwithstanding the persistence of traditional attitudes regarding the role of women, Lebanese women enjoy equal civil rights and attend institutions of higher education in large numbers (for example, women constituted 41 percent of the student body at the American University of Beirut in 1983). Although women in Lebanon have their own organizations, most exist as subordinate branches of the political parties.

The illiteracy rate for females in 2007 was 14%, compared to 6.6% among males. The economic activity rate for the age group 15 years and above is 68.9% for males, but only 20.4% for females. The proportion of seats held by women in parliament in 2020 was 6.1%.

== See also ==
- World Values Survey
