= Israeli occupation of Southern Lebanon (1982–2000) =

1982–2000 military occupation

South Lebanon Security Zone
- Israeli-occupied territory of Lebanon
- 1982–2000
- 1988 Israeli map of the occupied belt in Southern Lebanon
- Capital: Marjayoun
- Population
  - 1993: 180,000
- Government
  - Type: Military occupation (South Lebanon security belt administration)
- Administrator
  - 1985–2000: Antoine Lahad
- Historical era: Lebanese Civil War
  - Israeli invasion: 6 June 1982
  - Israeli withdrawal: 25 May 2000
Preceded by	Succeeded by
State of Free Lebanon	Republic of Lebanon

Israel occupied Southern Lebanon from 1982 until 2000. In June 1982, Israel invaded Lebanon in response to attacks from southern Lebanon by Palestinian militants. The Israel Defense Forces (IDF) occupied the southern half of Lebanon as far as the capital city Beirut, together with allied Maronite Christian paramilitaries involved in the Lebanese Civil War. The IDF left Beirut on 29 September 1982, but continued to occupy the country's southern half. Amid rising casualties from guerrilla attacks, the IDF withdrew south to the Awali river on 3 September 1983.

From February to April 1985, the IDF carried out a phased withdrawal to a "Security Zone" (Note: Hebrew: רצועת הביטחון, lit. 'security strip') along the border, which it said was to protect northern Israel. From this point onwards, Israel supported the South Lebanon Army (SLA), the Lebanese Christian paramilitary, against Hezbollah and other Muslim militants. They fought a guerrilla war in Southern Lebanon throughout the occupation.

The Security Zone covered about 800 square kilometres (310 sq mi), roughly 10% of Lebanon's land area. It ran the length of the Israel-Lebanon border and reached between 5 kilometres (3.1 mi) to 20 kilometres (12 mi) deep into Lebanon. It was home to about 180,000 people – 6% of Lebanon's population – living in around a hundred villages and small towns. In 1993, it was estimated that there were 1,000–2,000 Israeli troops and 2,300 SLA troops in the zone. While the IDF oversaw the region's general security, the SLA managed most of the occupied territory's affairs, including the operation of the Khiam detention centre. The SLA also controlled an enclave around Jezzine, just north of the Security Zone.

Most of Israel's Security Zone lay within the area patrolled by United Nations peacekeepers from the United Nations Interim Force in Lebanon (UNIFIL), who had been deployed there since Israel's 1978 invasion.

== Background ==
=== Palestinian insurgency and Lebanese Civil War ===
Although the occupied strip was officially formed by Israel in 1985, following the collapse of the State of Free Lebanon and Israel's disengagement from most of Lebanon, it has its roots in the follow-up to and early stages of the Lebanese Civil War. In 1968, Palestinian militants led by the Palestine Liberation Organization (PLO) had large-scale control over Southern Lebanon, from where they initiated an insurgency against Israel and Lebanese Christians.

By 1975, the PLO's presence had become a severe nuisance for Christians and local residents, and Christian militias began to increasingly engage Palestinian militants in open conflict. From mid-1976 onwards, Israel began to assist Lebanon's Christian residents and militias through the "Good Fence" along the Israel–Lebanon border.

=== 1978 Israeli invasion of Lebanon ===
Following the 1978 Coastal Road massacre of 38 Israeli citizens by Palestinian militants in Tel Aviv, Israel invaded Lebanon to displace the PLO from along its border, triggering the 1978 South Lebanon conflict. After a week of fighting, the PLO withdrew from Southern Lebanon, and Israel increased its support for the Christian South Lebanon Army (SLA).

In 1979, Saad Haddad, the founder of the SLA, proclaimed the establishment of the State of Free Lebanon with Israeli support. After Israel's withdrawal at the end of the operation, the United Nations Interim Force in Lebanon (UNIFIL) was deployed along the Israel–Lebanon border.

== History ==
=== 1982 Israeli invasion of Lebanon ===
Following increased attacks in northern Israel and the attempted assassination of Israeli diplomat Shlomo Argov, Israel invaded Lebanon to displace the PLO from along its border, triggering the 1982 Lebanon War. By 1985, Israel had withdrawn to a front designated as a "Security Zone" in Southern Lebanon, where it retained its forces to fight alongside the SLA against Hezbollah and other Muslim militant groups, which marked the beginning of the 1985–2000 South Lebanon conflict.

=== South Lebanon conflict ===
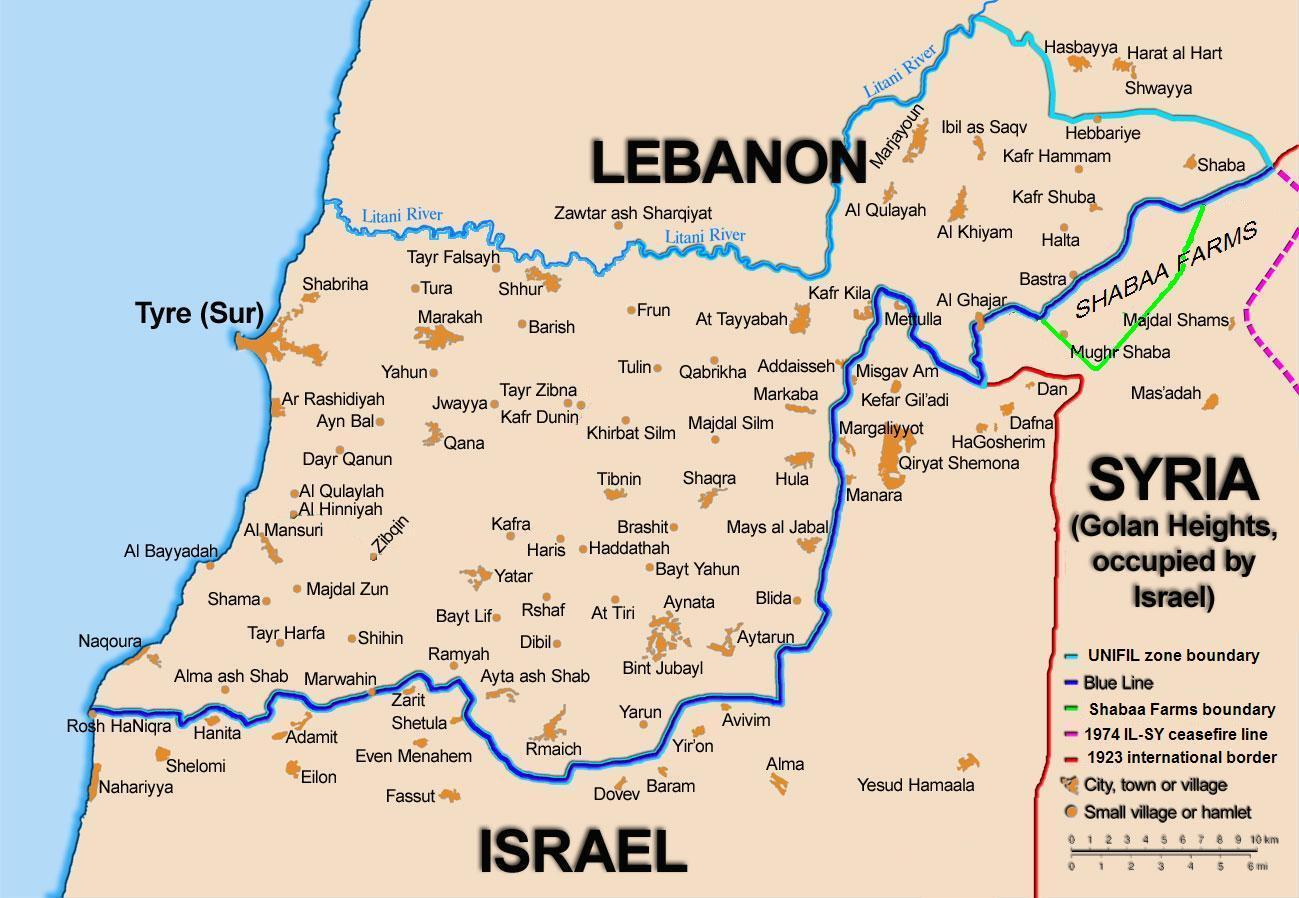
A map of Southern Lebanon, featuring the Blue Line, UNIFIL zone, and Litani River

During the evacuation in the first Lebanon war, the command of the SLA was delivered into the hands of Antoine Lahad, who demanded and received Israeli permission to hold the Jezzine zone north of the strip. In the first years after the IDF withdrawal from the north part of Lebanon, the strip was relatively quiet. Over the years, the Lebanese militant groups, led by Sh'ite Hezbollah, increased on the Israeli side in the security belt. Driving on the roads became dangerous, and IDF forces stayed more in the military camps than on the roads. Hezbollah made many efforts to attack the IDF's military camps.

On 27 July 1989 the Hizbullah leader in South Lebanon, Sheikh Abdel Karim Obeid and two of his aides, were abducted from his home in Jibchit, by IDF commandos. The night-time raid was planned by then Minister of Defence Yitzhak Rabin. Hizbullah responded by announcing the execution of Colonel Higgins a senior American officer working with UNIFIL who had been kidnapped in February 1988.

On 16 February 1992, the then-leader of Hezbollah, Abbas Musawi, was assassinated by IDF's helicopter missiles. The IDF assumed that the Hezbollah leadership would curb their activities for fear of their lives and the lives of their families. Hezbollah was headed by Sheikh Nasrallah.

In July 1993 the IDF launched Operation Accountability which caused widespread destruction throughout Southern Lebanon but failed to end Hezbollah’s activities.

On 11 April 1996 the Israeli army, navy and air force launched a seventeen day bombardment of southern Lebanon, Operation Grapes of Wrath, in which 154 Lebanese civilians were killed.

At the time, Israeli soldiers serving in Southern Lebanon received no ribbon for wartime military service, because Israel considered the maintaining of the security belt as a low-intensity conflict rather than a war. In early 2000, Chief-of-Staff Shaul Mofaz said that 1999 was "the IDF's most successful year in Lebanon" with 11 soldiers killed by hostiles in Southern Lebanon, the lowest casualty rate during the entire conflict. A total of 256 Israeli soldiers died in combat in South Lebanon from 1985 to 2000. In 2020, Israel recognized the conflict as a war, and retrospectively dubbed it the "Security Zone in Lebanon Campaign".

=== 2000 Israeli withdrawal ===
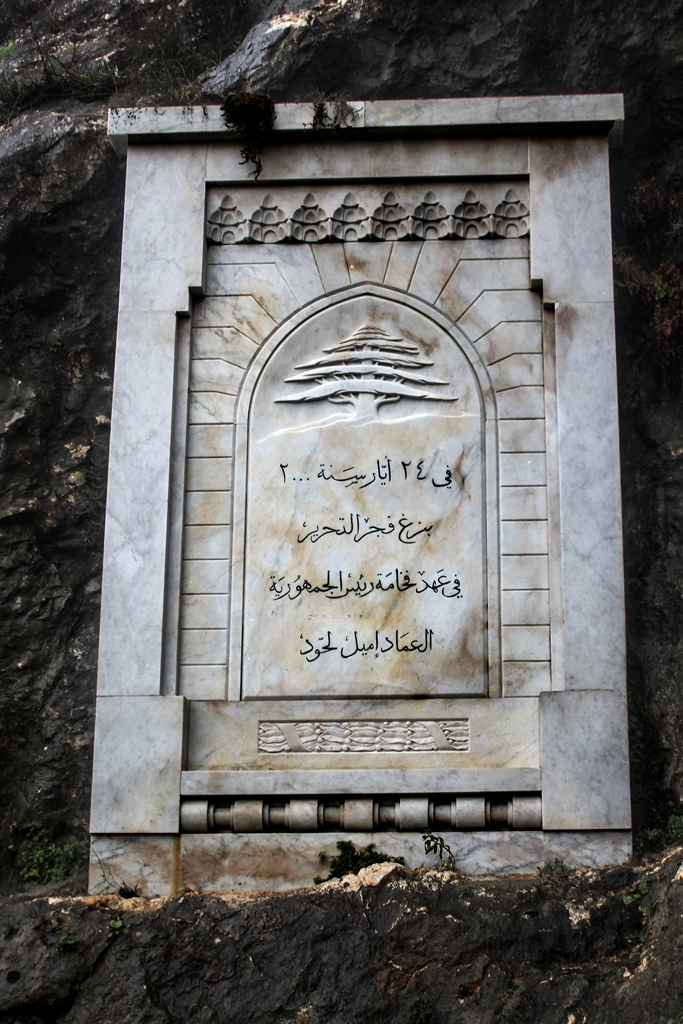
Stele erected at Nahr el-Kalb to mark the withdrawal of Israeli troops.

Before the Israeli election in May 1999 the prime minister of Israel, Ehud Barak, promised that within a year all Israeli forces would withdraw from Southern Lebanon, effectively dropping the support for the South Lebanon Army. When negotiation efforts between Israel and Syria, the goal of which was to bring a peace agreement between Israel and Lebanon as well, failed due to Syrian control of Lebanon until 2005, Barak led to the decision of withdrawal of the IDF to the Israeli border.

With the mounting pressure on South Lebanon Army and the South Lebanon security belt administration, the system began to fall apart, with many members of the army and administration requesting political asylum in Israel and other countries. With mounting attacks of Hezbollah, the ranks of the South Lebanese Army deteriorated, with reduced conscription and high rates of desertion at lower ranks. In April 2000, when it was clear the Israeli withdrawal was about to happen within weeks or months, some SLA officials began moving their families to northern Israel.

The Israeli complete withdrawal to the internationally recognized border took place on 24 May 2000. The South Lebanon Army shortly collapsed, with most officers and administration officials fleeing to Israel with their families, as Hezbollah amounted pressure on the remaining units. When Israel allowed the pouring refugees in, some 7,000 refugees, including South Lebanon Army soldiers, Security Zone officials and their families arrived in Galilee.

== Provisional security belt administration ==
The South Lebanon security belt administration was a Christian Lebanese provisional governance body that exercised authority in 850 square kilometres (330 sq mi) of the Israeli-occupied Security Zone. It replaced the institutions of the Free Lebanon State and operated from 1985 until 2000 with full Israeli logistical and military support. During its functioning years, the administration was headed by Antoine Lahad, a Maronite Christian military officer.

=== Active militias ===
The South Lebanon Army (SLA) was a Lebanese Christian militia that was active during the Lebanese Civil War and its aftermath until its disbandment in 2000. It was originally named the Free Lebanon Army, which split from the Christian splinter faction of the Lebanese Army that was known as the Army of Free Lebanon. After 1979, the SLA operated in Southern Lebanon under the authority of Saad Haddad. It was supported by Israel, and became its primary ally against Hezbollah during the 1985–2000 South Lebanon conflict.

At the time of Israel's Operation Accountability, Hezbollah claimed to have 3,000 fighters. Other reports estimated that the number was probably 600–700. Other groups who fought against Israel and the SLA were the PFLP–GC, a Syria-based Marxist–Leninist and Palestinian nationalist organization, and the Popular Guard of the Lebanese Communist Party.

== Economy ==
The launching of the Good Fence by Israel in 1976 coincided with the beginning of the Lebanese Civil War in 1975 and Israeli support for Christian militias against the Palestine Liberation Organization. From 1977 onwards, Israel allowed Maronites and their allies to find employment in Israel and provided assistance in exporting goods through the Israeli port city of Haifa. The main border crossing through which goods and workers crossed was Fatima Gate near Metula. This provided essential economic stability to the administration of the Free Lebanon State and the subsequent South Lebanon security belt administration.

Israel states that, before 2000, approximately one-third of the patients in the ophthalmology department of the Western Galilee Hospital were Lebanese citizens who crossed the border through the Good Fence and received treatment free of charge. The Good Fence ceased to exist with Israel's withdrawal from Southern Lebanon in 2000 and the disintegration of the South Lebanon security belt administration.

== Demographics ==
In 1993 estimates, the Security Zone had a population of 180,000. 50 percent were Shia Muslims, 10 percent were Maronites or Greek Orthodox Christians, 10 percent were Sunni Muslims, and 10 percent were Druze, most of whom lived in the town of Hasbaya. In the central zone of the Security Zone was the Maronite town of Marjayoun, which served as the capital of the Israeli-occupied belt. Some residents remaining in the Security Zone had contacts within Israel, many of whom worked there and received various services.

== See also ==
- Israeli–Lebanese conflict, 1968–2006 armed clashes involving Israel, Lebanon, Syria, and the PLO
  - 1978 South Lebanon conflict, invasion of Southern Lebanon by Israel
  - 1982 Lebanon War, invasion of most of Lebanon by Israel
  - 1985–2000 South Lebanon conflict, armed clashes in Israeli-occupied Southern Lebanon
- Operation Accountability, 1993 Israeli military operation against Hezbollah in Lebanon
- Operation Grapes of Wrath, 1996 Israeli military operation against Hezbollah in Lebanon
- List of extrajudicial killings and political violence in Lebanon
- 2026 Lebanon war
