= Galilee Panhandle =

Geopolitical area in north-eastern Israel

Coordinates: 33.2°N 35.6°E

A sketch with marked mountainous parts of the Galilee and its "panhandle"

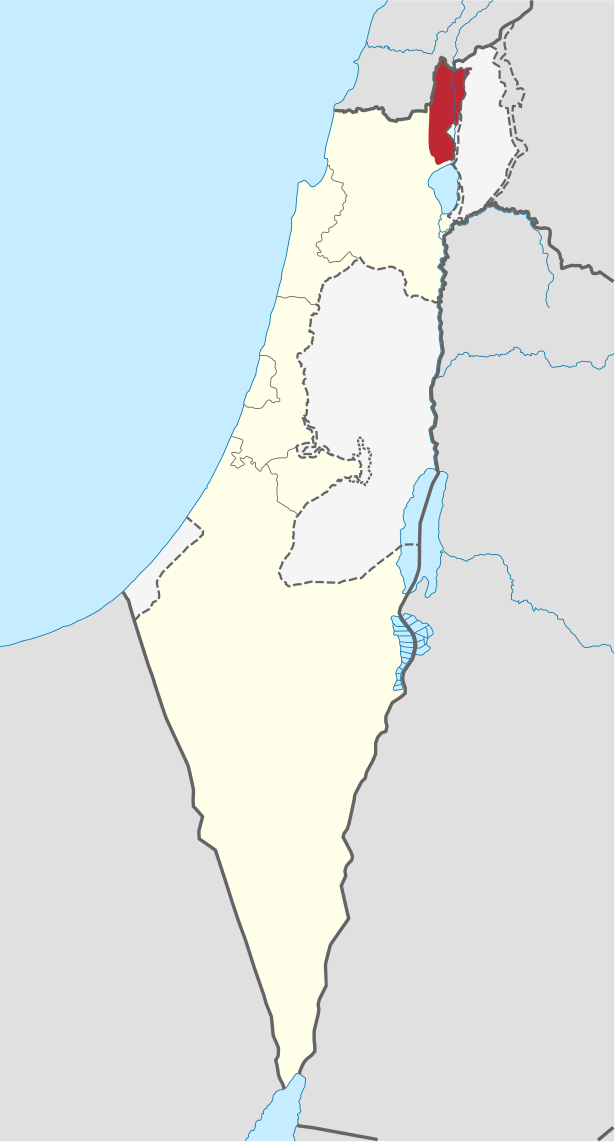
The Galilee Panhandle marked in red.

The Galilee Panhandle (Hebrew: אצבע הגליל, romanized: Etzba HaGalil, lit. 'Finger of the Galilee'), is an elongated geopolitical area or "panhandle" in northern Israel comprising the northernmost section of the Upper Galilee, and the northern Jordan Rift Valley. The Galilee Panhandle incorporates five municipal authorities. Towns in the Galilee Panhandle include Metula and Kiryat Shmona.

The ancient site of Tel Dan is located in the Galilean panhandle.

== Geography ==
The Galilee Panhandle is a narrow strip of land running from the Israel-Lebanon border in the far north to an imaginary line below the Hula Valley, approximately between the kibbutzim Malkia and Gonen, in the south.

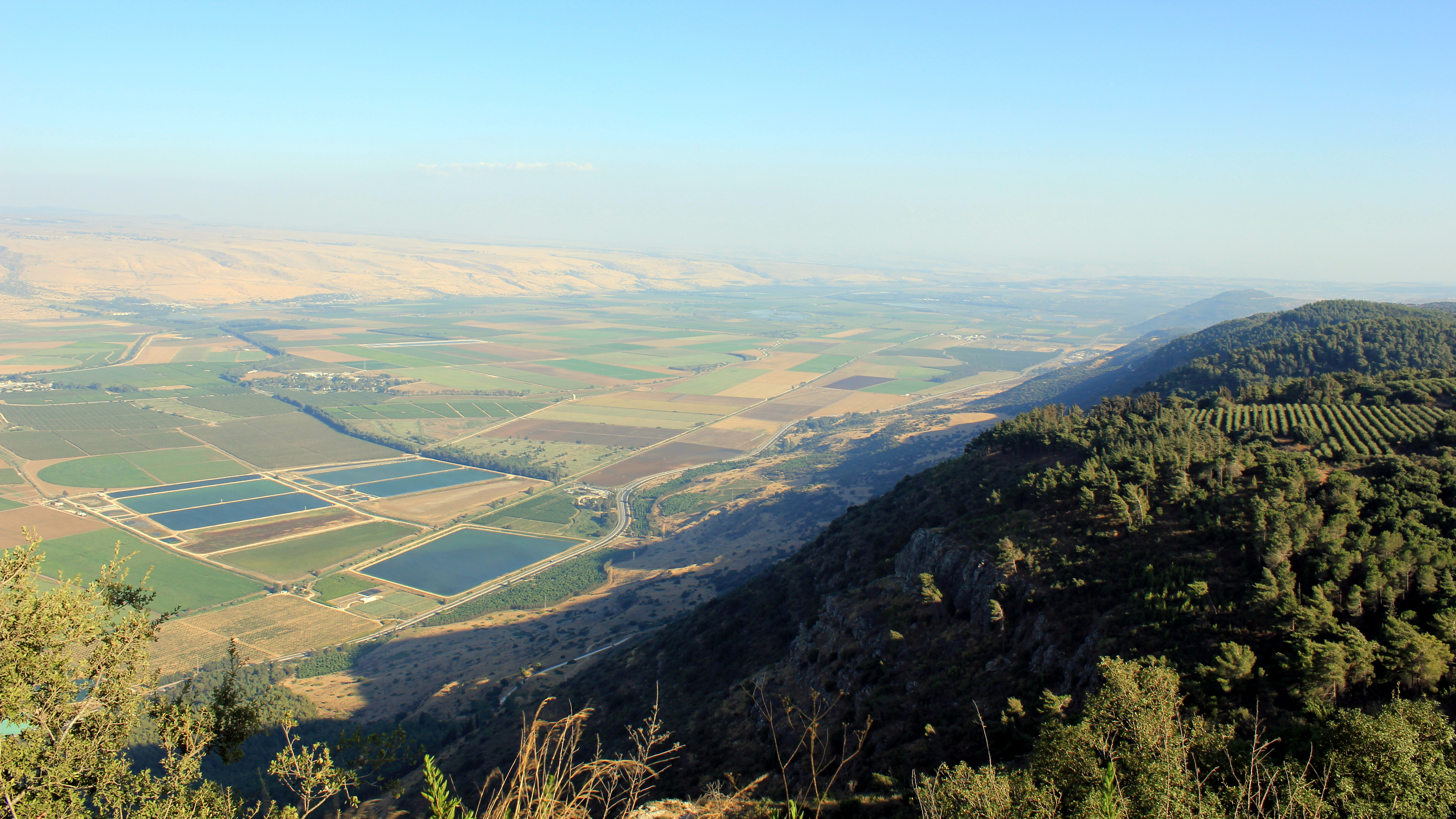
View from Manara cliff

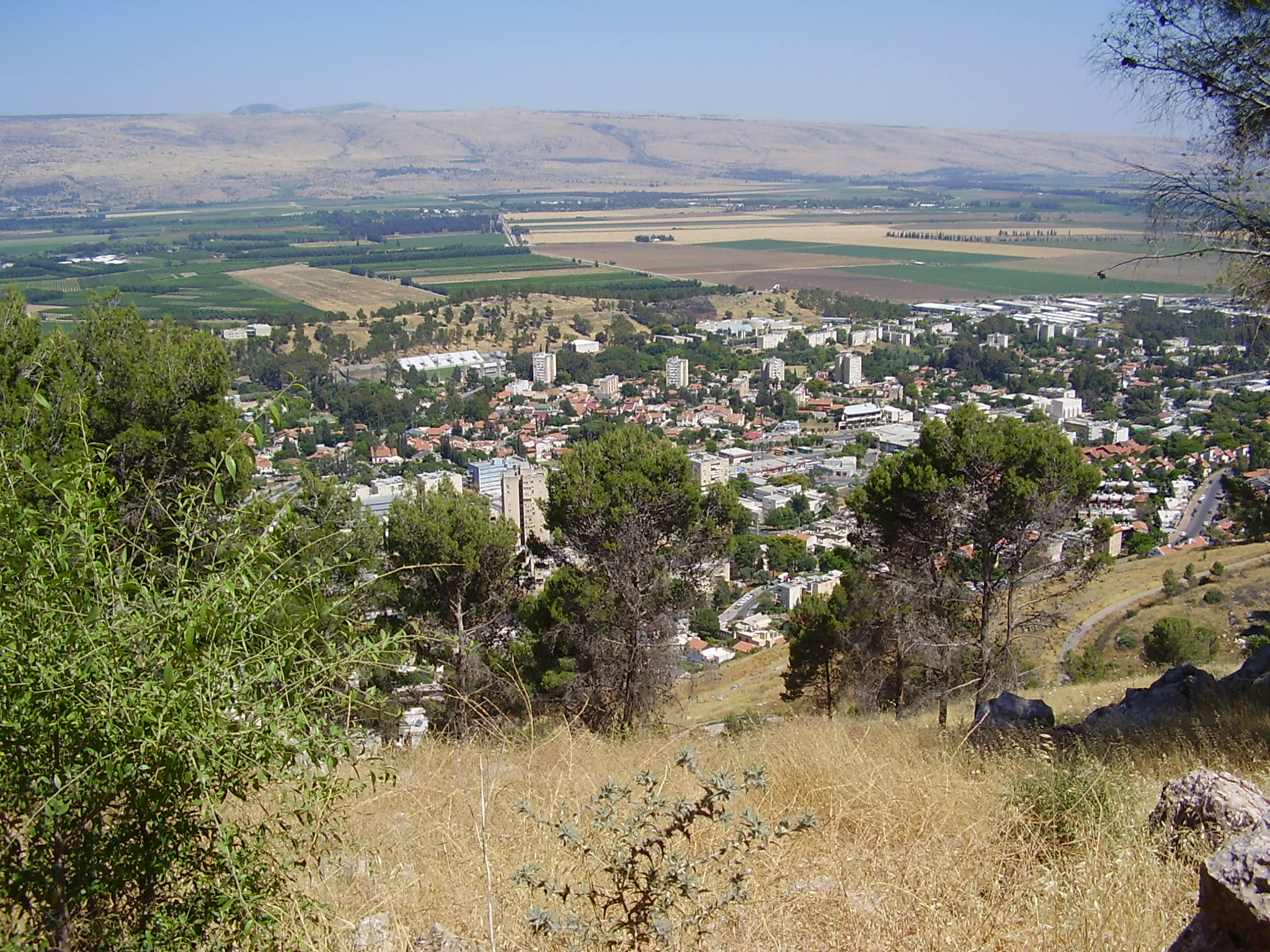
View of Kiryat Shmona from Mitzpe Liran

== History ==
In 1920, the Sykes-Picot Treaty was amended to transfer areas of Jewish settlement from the territory of the French Mandate for Syria and the Lebanon to that of the British Mandate for Palestine. From April 1924, the area came under British control. An agreement was reached which enabled cultivation on both sides of the border with taxes being distributed between the British and French mandate authorities. The boundary was problematic, strategically and politically, but harnessing water sources in this region was vital for the development of the country.

During Operation Yiftah in April and May 1948, the Arabs living in the Galilee Panhandle and the other Shia villages in Palestine were expelled by Palmach forces.

Cross-border raiding and rocket attacks from Lebanon have been an ongoing problem for communities in the Galilee Panhandle In November 2011, rockets were fired into Israel, landing near the border. The incident was called "a dangerous reminder" of the 34-day war in 2006 against Iranian- and Syrian-backed Hezbollah forces in Lebanon. During the Israel–Hezbollah war that began in October 2023, the Galilee Panhandle, due to its proximity to the Lebanese border, was repeatedly targeted by Hezbollah rocket, missile, and anti-tank attacks, prompting frequent air-raid sirens, evacuations, and significant military responses as part of the northern front of the conflict.

== See also ==
- Geography of Israel
- Good Fence, an epithet for Israel's mountainous 80-mile northern border with Lebanon after the 1978 South Lebanon conflict
- Upper Galilee Regional Council
