= Good Fence =

1976–2000 Israeli policy that supported Christian militias in Lebanon

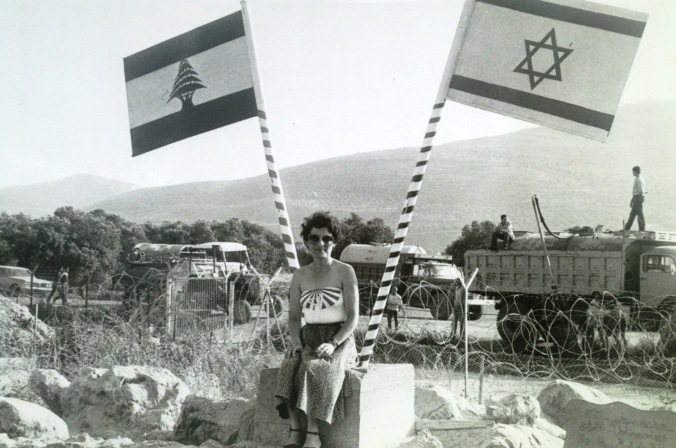
Pre-2000 Israeli-Lebanese border

The Good Fence (Hebrew: הגדר הטובה, romanized: HaGader HaTova, Arabic: السياج الجيد, romanized: as-Siyaj al-Jayyid) was a term that referred to Israel's mountainous 129-kilometre (80 mi) northern border with Lebanon during the period following the 1978 South Lebanon conflict, during the Lebanese Civil War. At the time, southern Lebanon was controlled by the Maronite Christian militias and the South Lebanon Army, as the Free Lebanon State (1978–1984) and later the South Lebanon security belt administration.

== Background ==
From the 1948 establishment of the State of Israel until 1970, Israel's border with Lebanon was somewhat quiet to the point that farmers from the Israeli town of Metula farmed their lands in the Ayoun Valley inside Lebanon. Throughout the early to mid 1960s the border was largely peaceful, and no fortifications or fencing had been built by either side. This started to change after infiltrators from the Lebanese side sabotaged a water pipe in Israel, resulting in the creation of a perimeter fence along the border. Not long after this, Kibbutz Manara was shelled from the Lebanese side on May 5 1967, and again in June 1968. In 1970, after their expulsion from Jordan during Black September, the PLO began taking control over southern Lebanon. Coinciding with the escalation of violence within Lebanon and the later outbreak of the Lebanese Civil War, starting in 1968, the border became a line of confrontation between Israel and Palestinian militias.

== History ==
In mid-July 1976, Israel initiated the Good Fence policy, opening border crossings at Rmaish and Kfar Kila the following month. The Palestine Liberation Organization (PLO) largely disregarded this shift toward overt Israeli involvement in southern Lebanon, focusing instead on consolidating political influence and competing for control over food and aid distribution. As part of these dynamics, the PLO imposed a blockade on the villages of Rmaish, Debel, and Ain Ebel, which compelled local residents to depend on the Good Fence crossings for essential supplies.

The main border crossing for goods and workers was the Fatima Gate crossing near Metula. This provided essential economic stability to the administration of the State of Free Lebanon and the later South Lebanon security belt administration.

Cross-border employment under the Good Fence extended beyond the movements of goods and medical patients. Based on ethnographic research in villages of the former Israeli security zone, anthropologist Munira K, describes Lebanese civilians being transported into Israel everyday to work as hospital technicians, builders, agricultural labourers and other low status occupations. The access to these jobs could be arranged through relatives serving in the South Lebanese Army. For instance, Khayyat records one worker paying his SLA affiliated brother 150$ from his monthly salary of approximately 500$ in exchange of his sponsorship. Although the wages were low within Israel, they were comparatively way more attractive in occupied Southern Lebanon. Khayyat affirms that residents entered this labour system for varying economic reasons. Them being opportunity, necessity and coercion.

Before 2000, approximately one-third of the ophthalmology patients at Western Galilee Hospital were Lebanese who crossed the border through the Good Fence and received treatment free of charge.

The Good Fence ceased to exist with Israel's withdrawal from southern Lebanon in 2000 and disintegration of the South Lebanon security belt administration and the SLA militia.

Furthermore, it's important to note that the termination of the Good Fence also separated families whose relationships transpassed across the border. Bedouin communities in which residents of neighbouring Lebanese and Israeli villages, still belonged to the same families. And after the border closed, relatives continued to attend funerals and reunions by assembling on opposite sides of the fence. For example, a Lebanese Bedouin women named Im Alaa had parents and siblings on the Israeli side. While attempting to obtain the information about her sick father during the occupation, she approached the border and triggered an anti-personnel mine, resulting in the amputation of her lower leg. Following the Israeli withdrawal, two of her daughters remained on the Israeli side, the closed border prevented her from visiting them.

== Civilian experiences ==
Participation in the cross-border economy did not necessarily result to formal membership in the SLA. It's important to distinguish armed or abusive collaboration from the ordinary accomodation through which these civilians attempted to maintain their livelihoods under occupation. As most of these choices were influenced by inequalities within the villages. Members of smaller and less influencial families often lacked access to the land, public positions and kinship networks available to locally dominant families. An association with the occupying authorities could subsequently provide otherwise unavailable income or social mobility. Nonetheless, political affiliations could also change after the occupation. For example, one of Khayyat's interlocutors had worked in an israeli hospital without joining the SLA. Later he developed a successful business within the post 2006 reconstruction economy. He also displayed the portrait of Hezbollah leader Hassan Nasrallah in his home and had sons who joined the resistance. Khayyat uses these cases to highlight the difficulty of placing civilian survival within fixed categories of resistance and collaboration.

== See also ==
- Arab–Israeli alliance
- Israel–Lebanon relations
- Operation Good Neighbour
