= State of Free Lebanon =

Client state of Israel (1979–1984)

State of Free Lebanon دولة لبنان الحرة Dawlat Lubnān al-Ḥurra
- 1979–1984
- Flag of Lebanon (1943–1990)

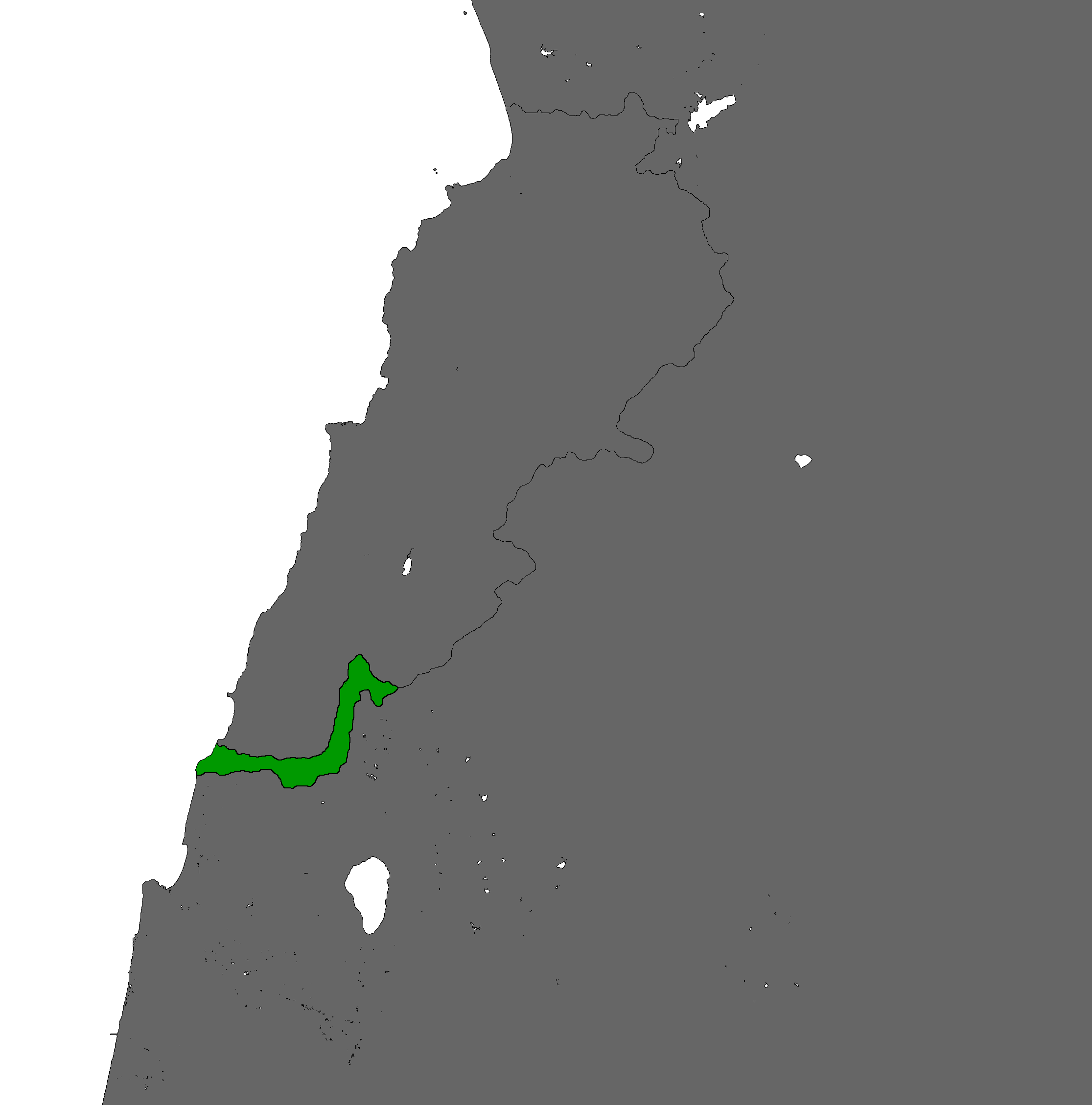
- Map of the State of Free Lebanon at its greatest extent
- Status: Unrecognized puppet state of Israel; Militia-controlled territory
- Capital: Marjayoun
- Common languages: Arabic; French; Hebrew
- Religion: Islam; Christianity; Druze faith
- Demonyms: Free Lebanese; South Lebanese
- President
  - 1979–1984: Saad Haddad
- Historical era: Lebanese Civil War
  - Declared: 18 April 1979
  - Operation Peace for the Galilee: 1982
  - Death of Saad Haddad: 14 January 1984

Area
  - Total: 238.8 km^{2} (92.2 sq mi)

Population
- 150,000 (est.)
- Currency: Lebanese pound (LBP); Old Israeli shekel (IS)
Preceded by	Succeeded by
Lebanon; Fatahland	Israeli occupation of Southern Lebanon (1982–2000)
- Today part of: Lebanon

The State of Free Lebanon (Arabic: دولة لبنان الحرة, Dawlat Lubnān al-Ḥurra) was an unrecognized separatist country in Lebanon that acted as a puppet state of Israel. On 18 April 1979, Lebanese military officer Saad Haddad proclaimed the independence of a "Free Lebanon" carved out of the southernmost territory of Lebanon, amidst the hostilities of the Lebanese Civil War. Haddad was the founding commander of the South Lebanon Army, a quasi-military that aimed to serve the political interests of the South Lebanese (and especially South Lebanese Christians) as the central government's authority collapsed during the conflict.

Though Free Lebanon garnered no international recognition, it received support from neighboring Israel; the South Lebanon Army and the Israel Defense Forces had established a working alliance with each other during the 1978 Israeli invasion of Lebanon. Despite being further bolstered by the 1982 Israeli invasion of Lebanon, the authority of Free Lebanon rapidly deteriorated following Haddad's death in 1984.

In the post-Haddad era, Christian governance continued in the form of the South Lebanon security belt administration, which remained intact under the umbrella of the 1985–2000 Israeli occupation of Southern Lebanon. Over the course of the South Lebanon conflict, the Christian administration and the South Lebanon Army operated under Israel's supervision, ultimately collapsing upon the Israeli withdrawal in 2000.

== History ==
The state was announced by Saad Haddad on 18 April 1979. The following day, he was branded a traitor to the Lebanese government and officially dismissed from the Lebanese Army.

Free Lebanon's existence relied on Israeli logistic and (after 1982) military support, effectively making it a client-state of Israel. Free Lebanon functioned for several years as a semi-independent authority in South Lebanon, being in a complete political disconnection with the internationally recognized Lebanese government in Beirut. The government of Free Lebanon under Haddad's leadership never received international recognition.

Following the 1982 Lebanon War, much of the claimed territory of Free Lebanon became part of the South Lebanon Security Belt, under joint control of the Israeli Army and the Free Lebanon Army. The authority of Free Lebanon further deteriorated with the death of Saad Haddad in January 1984, following which only the military force of the self-proclaimed state continued to function, rebranded as the South Lebanon Army (SLA).

== Communications ==
During the first two years of the South Lebanon conflict (1982–2000), Saad Haddad headed the Christian radio station "Voice of Hope", initially set up and funded by George Otis of High Adventure Ministries. The Voice of Hope was set up as a charitable endeavor to help the Christian enclave in Southern Lebanon, but it quickly became politicized, when Hadaad used it for political diatribes aimed at his many enemies.

High Adventure billed it as the only privately owned radio station in the Middle East that was broadcasting the Gospel, but its message was often tainted by the necessary affiliation with Hadaad's militia, as its operation depended upon his protection and authority, resulting in a very curious blend of scripture lessons and political commentary which the staff at the station could not control or regulate.

Building on positive coverage of Voice of Hope, in 1982 Pat Robertson founded the first overseas branch of his Christian Broadcasting Network, known as Middle East Television, and placed his son, Tim, in charge. Although the Sabra and Shatila massacre caused a brief falling-out between the Americans and Haddad, CBN and Voice of Hope both continued uninterrupted broadcasting through the end of Free Lebanon and until Israel ended its occupation in 2000.

== Economy ==
The beginning of the Good Fence coincides with the beginning of the civil war in Lebanon in 1976 and Israeli support for the Christian-dominated militias in southern Lebanon in their battle with the PLO. From 1977, Israel allowed the South Lebanese Christians and their allies to find employment in Israel and provided assistance in exporting their goods through the Israeli port city of Haifa. The main border crossing through which goods and workers crossed was the Fatima Gate crossing near Metula. This provided essential economic stability to the administration of Free Lebanon and the later South Lebanon security belt administration.

== Relationship with the United Nations ==
The freedom of movement of UNIFIL personnel and UNTSO observers within the Free Lebanon enclave remained restricted due to the actions of Amal and the Free Lebanon Army under Major Saad Haddad's leadership with the backing of Israeli military forces. During the 1982 Lebanon War, UN positions were overrun, primarily by the South Lebanon Army forces under Saad Haddad.

== See also ==
- History of Lebanon
