= COVID czar =

COVID czar may refer to:

- COVID czar, head of Israel Shield, the Israeli COVID-19 program
- White House COVID-19 Response Coordinator, head of the White House COVID-19 Response Team, nicknamed COVID-19 Czar

== See also ==
- Czar (political term)
- National responses to the COVID-19 pandemic
