= Salman Zarka =

Israeli Druze physician

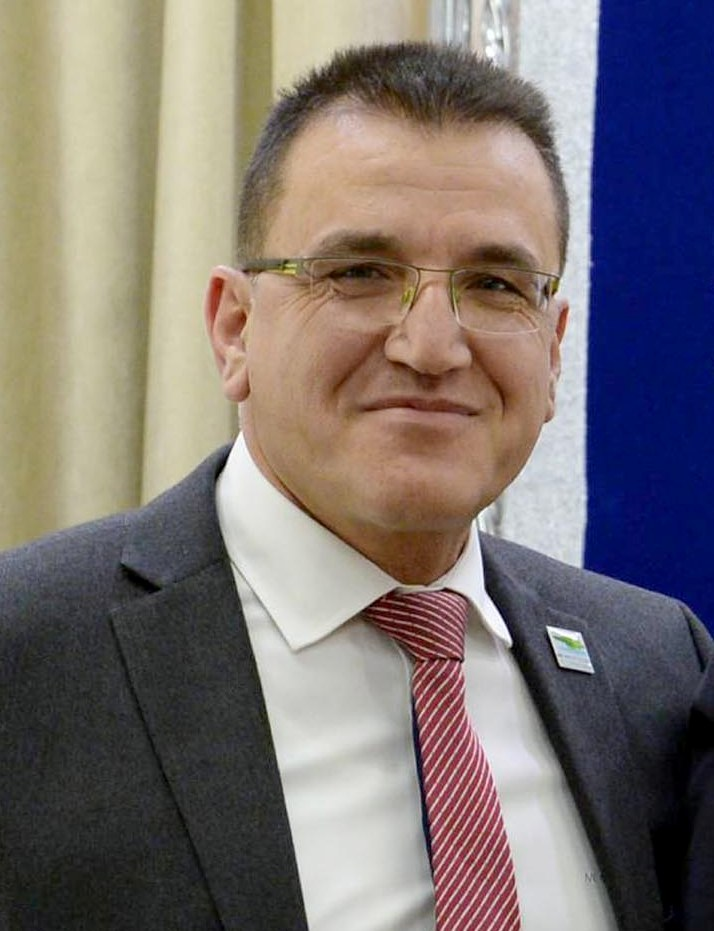
Zarka in 2017

Salman Zarka (Arabic: سلمان الزرقا, Hebrew: סלמאן זרקא) is an Israeli physician and the current Director of Ziv Medical Center in Safed. He is a reservist of the Israel Defense Forces in the rank of Colonel, and a senior lecturer at the Faculty of Social Welfare and Health in the School of Public Health of Haifa University and the Department of Military Medicine in the military doctors top track of Hebrew University in Jerusalem.

In 2021, he had served as Israel's COVID czar.

== Early life and education ==
Salman Zarka was born in 1964 in Peki'in, Israel, to a large Druze family. He studied at the School of Medicine in Technion, Haifa. Zarka has a master's degree in epidemiology and public health from the Hebrew University Braun School of Public Health and Community Medicine. He is a graduate of the National Security College, and has a master's degree in political science and national security from the University of Haifa.

== Career ==
=== Military service ===
After receiving his MD degree he started his military service which lasted over 25 years. Zarka served as Head of the military health branch at the Chief Medical Corps. He was promoted to the rank of Colonel, and he served as the head of the Northern Command’s Medical Corps. He also served as the Commander of the IDF Center for Medical Services and the Head of Health Department in the Medical Corps. In March 2013 he founded and commanded the operation of a field hospital on the Israel-Syria border for the treatment of wounded victims of the Syrian Civil War.

=== Academics ===
Zarka served as a senior lecturer at the Faculty of Social Welfare and Health in the School of Public Health of Haifa University and the Department of Military Medicine in the military doctors top track of Hebrew University in Jerusalem.

Zarka has two specialties: one in the field of public health and the other one in the field of medical management.

=== Medical services ===
At the time of the IDF Operation Protective Edge, during which he served as Commander of the IDF Center for Medical Services, Zarka managed the provision of medical services to the soldiers in the operation area, treatment of hospitalized soldiers and the establishment of military hospital in the Erez Crossing intended to provide assistance for the Gaza Strip citizens.

After serving as the Commander of the IDF Center for Medical Services, Zarka ended his military career and became the Director of Ziv Medical Center in Safed. He assumed this new role in December 2014. The beginning of his work was followed by a lawsuit filed by doctors who competed against him for the position and lost the tender. The lawsuit alleged that the Civil Service Commissioner was not authorized to approve the late tender application submitted by Zarka following his participation in Operation Protective Edge. The lawsuit was discussed at the Labour Court, where it was decided to hold a repeated tender, in which Zarka again won the position of Director of Ziv Medical Center.

Under the direction of Zarka, Ziv Medical Center lead the humanitarian treatment of wounded in Syrian civil war. Many patients have been treated at Ziv Medical Center as part of the Israeli humanitarian aid to Syrian citizens. Under the initiative Operation Good Neighbor, 20% of wounded Syrians brought to Israel for treatment were treated in Ziv Medical Center as of July 2017.

In 2019, Zarka was selected as one of 13 torch-lighters at the annual Independence Day ceremony on Mount Herzl in Jerusalem.

As of July 2021, he has been serving as Israel's COVID czar.

== Publications ==
- Complicated War Trauma and Care of the Wounded: The Israeli Experience in Medical Care and Humanitarian Support of Syrian Refugees (2017) ISBN 9783319533391

== See also ==
- List of Israeli Druze
