= Ziv Medical Center =

Hospital in Safed, Israel

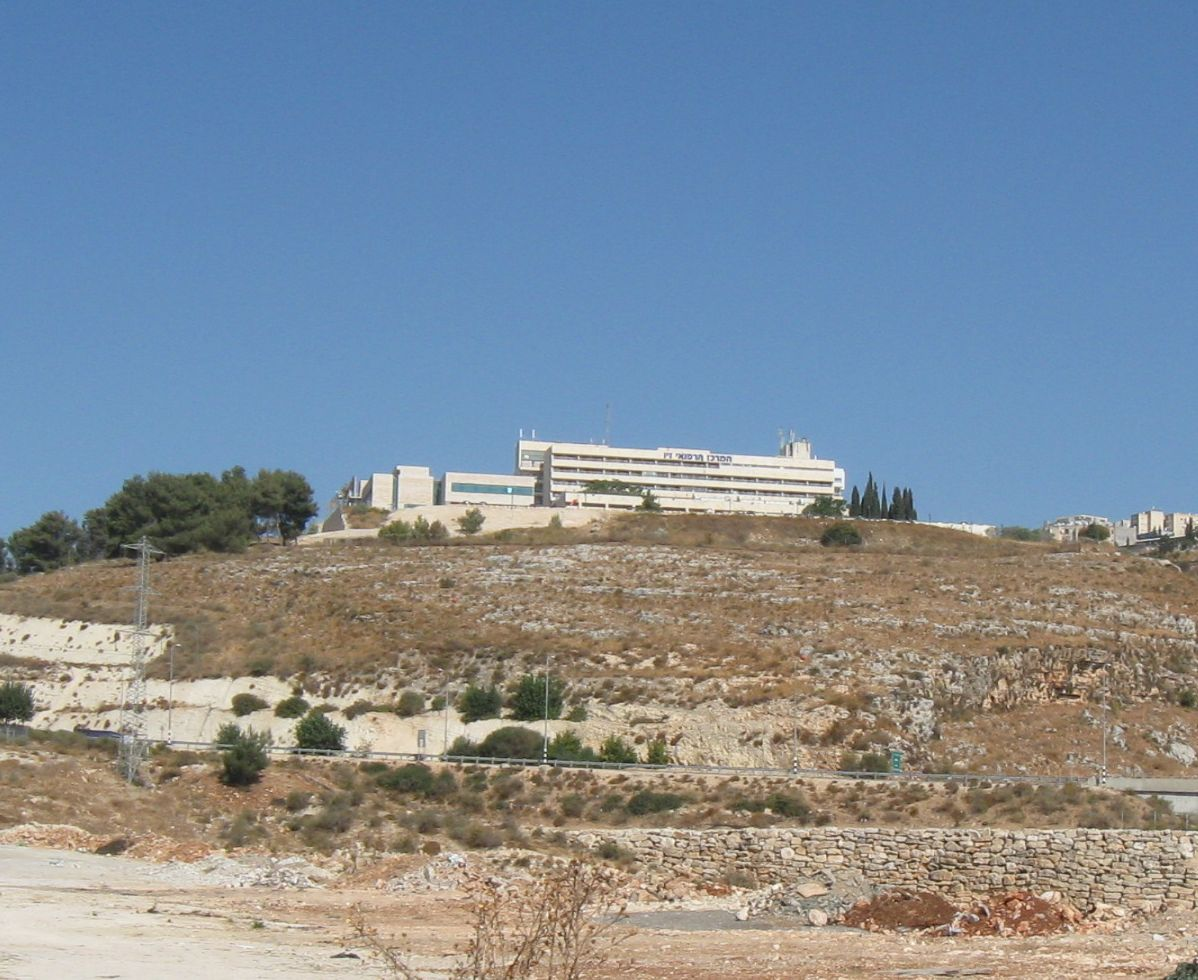
- Ziv Medical Center

Geography
- Location: Israel
- Coordinates: 32°57′14″N 35°29′34″E

Organisation
- Type: General hospital

Services
- Emergency department: Yes
- Beds: 370

Ziv Medical Center (also Rebecca Sieff Hospital) (Hebrew: בית החולים רבקה זיו | המרכז הרפואי זיו) is a general hospital in Safed, Israel, that serves the residents of Safed, the Upper Galilee and the northern Golan Heights. Ziv Medical Center has 370 beds and serves as a regional trauma center in the event of accidents, natural disasters, terror attacks and war. It is also serves as a teaching hospital associated with the Azrieli Faculty of Medicine of Bar-Ilan University which is also located in Safed.

== History ==
The hospital used to operate an urgent care center in Kiryat Shmona, but it closed in 2014.

During the 2006 Lebanon War, the hospital suffered a direct rocket hit, which caused damage to the infrastructure, as well as injuring five patients, 2 doctors and two other staff members.

After the outbreak of the Syrian Civil War, the hospital treated Syrians injured in the fighting, with an estimated 9 million dollars invested in treating Syrian refugees alone. The Israel Defense Forces and the Israeli government covered two-thirds of the cost, while a third was covered by the hospital itself.

In 2014, Salman Zarka was appointed director-general of the hospital, replacing its long-time director Oscar Embon. Zarka, born in Peki'in in the Upper Galilee, is the first Druze to head an Israeli hospital.

In 2016, a child health center was opened within the facility. The center is located in a reinforced building, comprehensively addresses the needs of northern residents, and is designed to provide initial assistance in emergency events.

Under the direction of Zarka, Ziv Medical Center led the humanitarian treatment of wounded in the Syrian civil war. About 800 Syrian patients were treated at Ziv Medical Center from 2013 to 2016, as part of the Israeli humanitarian aid to Syrian citizens. Under the initiative Operation Good Neighbor, 20% of wounded Syrians brought to Israel for treatment were treated in Ziv Medical Center as of July 2017.

Amid the Western Syria clashes after the fall of the fall of the Assad regime, the Ziv Medical Center admitted 32 injured Syrian Druze and a Syrian girl for treatment.

In June 2023, at the Jerusalem Post annual conference, Zarka announced the establishment of the "Partners of Ziv" as part of an effort to provide comprehensive medical care to address medical problems for the 300,000 residents of Israel's north.

== See also ==
- Health care in Israel
- List of hospitals in Israel
