= Ghuraba, Safad =

Ghuraba غرابة
- Village
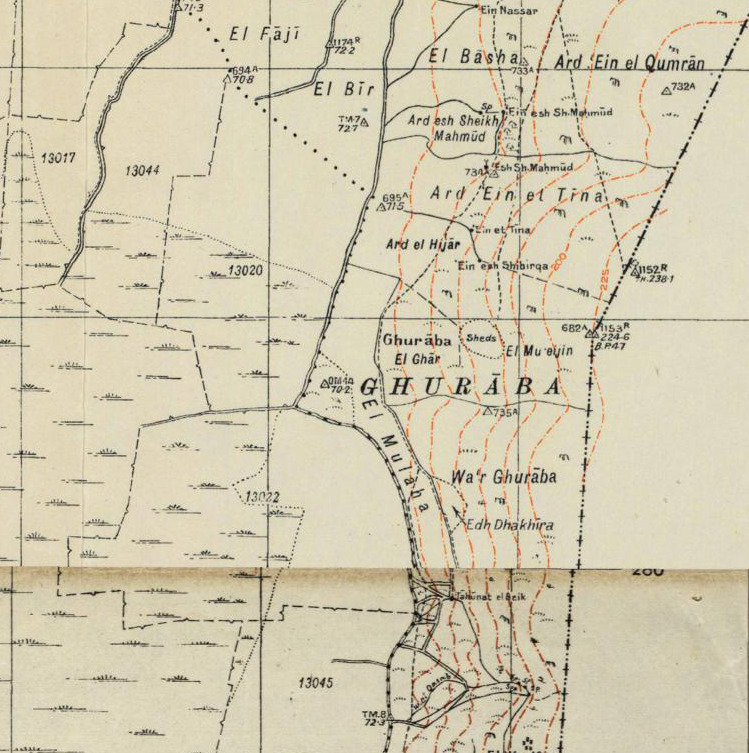
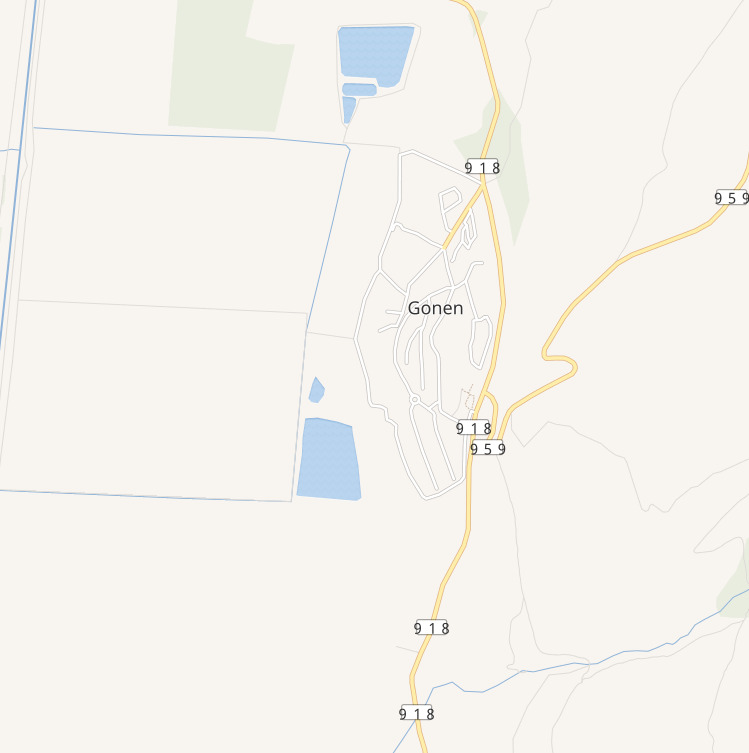
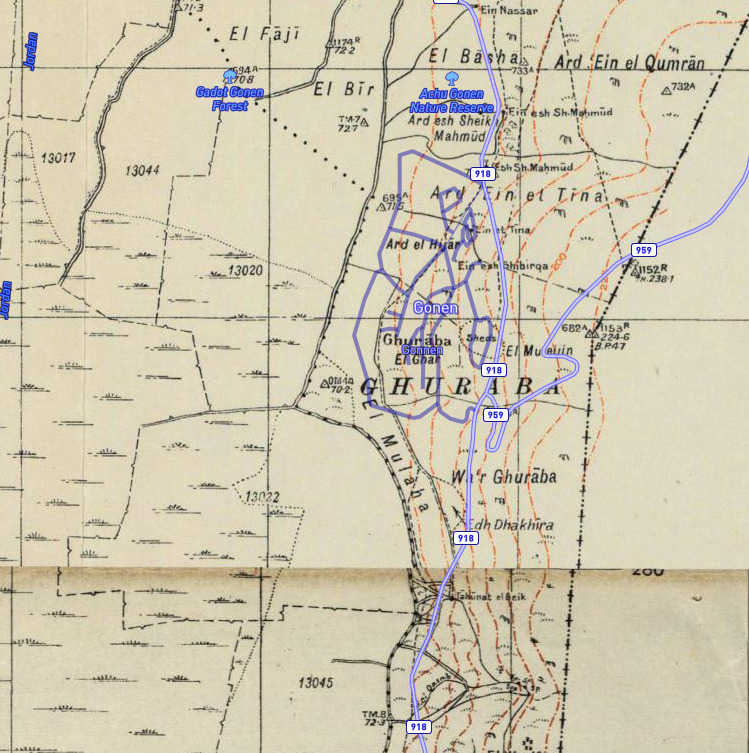
- 1940s map modern map 1940s with modern overlay map A series of historical maps of the area around Ghuraba (click the buttons)

- Location within Mandatory Palestine
- Coordinates: 33°07′17″N 35°38′45″E
- Palestine grid: 210/280
- Geopolitical entity: Mandatory Palestine
- Subdistrict: Safad
- Date of depopulation: May 28, 1948

Population (1945)
  - Total: 220
- Cause(s) of depopulation: Fear of being caught up in the fighting
- Current Localities: Gonen

Ghuraba (Arabic: غرابة) was a Palestinian Arab village in the Safad Subdistrict. It was depopulated during the 1948 War on May 28, 1948, by the Palmach's First Battalion of Operation Yiftach. It was located 22 km northeast of Safad.

In 1945 it had a population of 220 Muslims.

== History ==
=== British mandate era ===
In the 1931 census of Palestine, during the British Mandate for Palestine, the village had a population of 124 Muslims, in a total of 27 houses.

By the 1945 statistics the population was 220 Muslims, with a total of 2,933 dunams of land, according to an official land and population survey. Of this, Arabs used 2,928 dunams for plantations and irrigable land, while a total of 47 dunams was non-cultivable area.

=== 1948, aftermath ===
After fighting broke out nearby on 1 May, 1948, many villagers fled. By late June, the Haganah Intelligence reported that there were "concentrations of Arab refugees" in Ghuraba.

In 1951 Gonen was established on Ghurabah land.

In 1992 the village site was described: "The stones of ruined houses are strewn across the fenced-in site. Segments of a few stone walls still stand. The site and the surrounding land are used for grazing."

== Bibliography ==
- Department of Statistics (1945). Village Statistics, April, 1945. Government of Palestine.
- Hadawi, S. (1970). Village Statistics of 1945: A Classification of Land and Area ownership in Palestine. Palestine Liberation Organization Research Center.
- Khalidi, W. (1992). All That Remains: The Palestinian Villages Occupied and Depopulated by Israel in 1948. Washington D.C.: Institute for Palestine Studies. ISBN 0-88728-224-5.
- Mills, E., ed. (1932). Census of Palestine 1931. Population of Villages, Towns and Administrative Areas. Jerusalem: Government of Palestine.
- Morris, B. (2004). The Birth of the Palestinian Refugee Problem Revisited. Cambridge University Press. ISBN 978-0-521-00967-6.
