= Gonen =

Gonen: גּוֹנֵן (Hebrew)
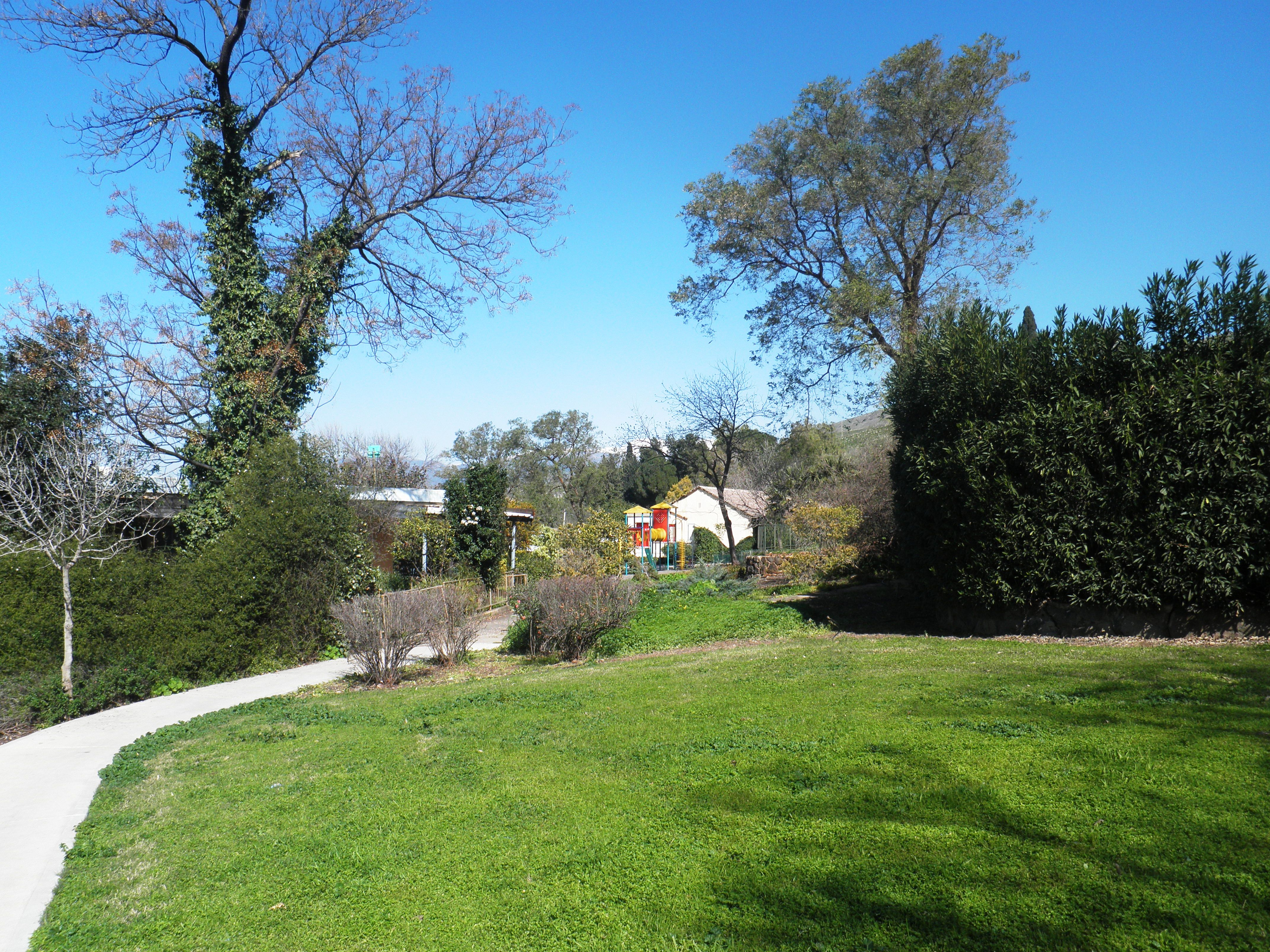
- Etymology: Defended
- Location within Northeast Israel
- Coordinates: 33°7′21″N 35°38′47″E
- Country: Israel
- District: Northern
- Subdistrict: Safed
- Council: Upper Galilee
- Affiliation: Kibbutz Movement
- Founded: 13 August 1951
- Founder: Nahal
- Population (2024): 405
- Website: kgonen.org.il

Gonen (Hebrew: גּוֹנֵן, lit. Defended) is a kibbutz in northern Israel. Located in the Finger of the Galilee near Kiryat Shmona, the kibbutz falls under the jurisdiction of Upper Galilee Regional Council. In 2024 it had a population of 405.

== History ==
Gonen was established on 13 August 1951 as a Nahal settlement on land near the former Palestinian village of Ghuraba, which had become depopulated in the 1948 Arab–Israeli War.

It was civilianised a year later by a group of Hebrew Scouts. It was the first Nahal settlement to convert to civilian control.

Its name is derived from the Book of Kings and symbolized the settlement's strategic location and proximity to the pre-Six-Day War Israel–Syria border, established in the 1949 Armistice Agreements. During the 1949–1967 period, the village's vicinity was the site of numerous skirmishes with the Syrian army.

Since 1994, the kibbutz has been in the process of conversion to a community settlement.

== Economy ==
The economy of Gonen is based upon agriculture, including corn, citrus fruits, and the raising of cattle. There is also a mini-market and a guest house.
