= Israeli humanitarian operations during the Syrian Civil War =

Israeli humanitarian military operation

Operation Good Neighbor (Hebrew: שכנות טובה, Shkhenut Tova, lit. "Good neighborliness") was a directive of the Northern Command's 210th Division of Israel Defence Forces (IDF) launched in June 2016 to provide humanitarian assistance to Syrian citizens who were affected by the Syrian Civil War. The army kept the operation confidential until announcing it in July 2017.

Thousands of Syrians received medical treatment as part of the initiative, both in Israel and in Syrian territory, and a significant amount of supplies were delivered, including over a million liters of fuel.

In September 2018, the IDF announced the closure of the operation after the Assad government regained control over the entire southern region of Syria.

== Background ==
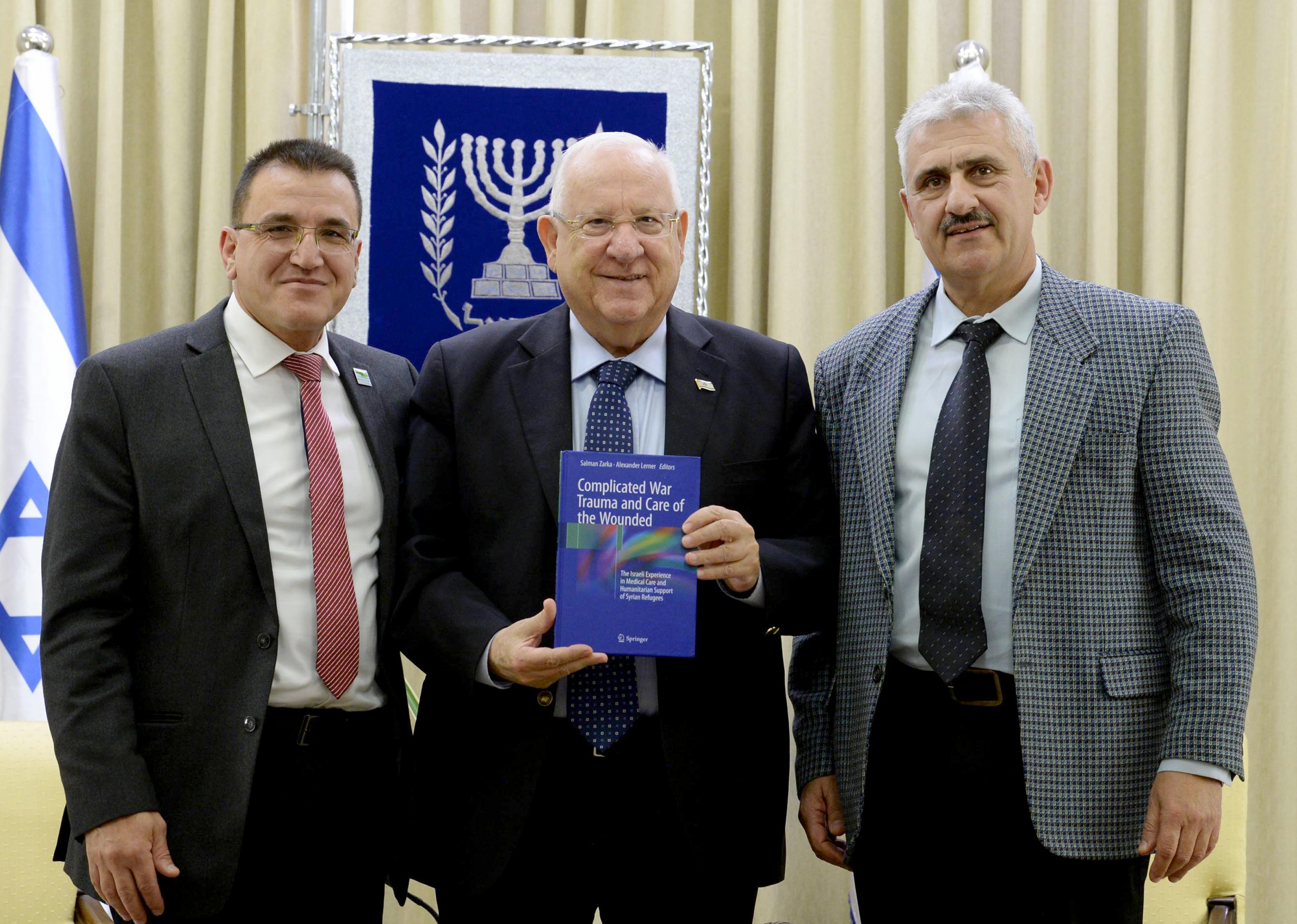
Israeli President Reuven Rivlin (center) meeting with Director of Rebecca Sieff Hospital Dr. Salman Zarka (left) and director of the orthopedic department, Prof. Alexander Lerner (right) in Safed, receiving the book Complicated War Trauma and Care of the Wounded which deals with the medical and humanitarian assistance granted to Syrian refugees at the hospital.

=== Medical aid ===
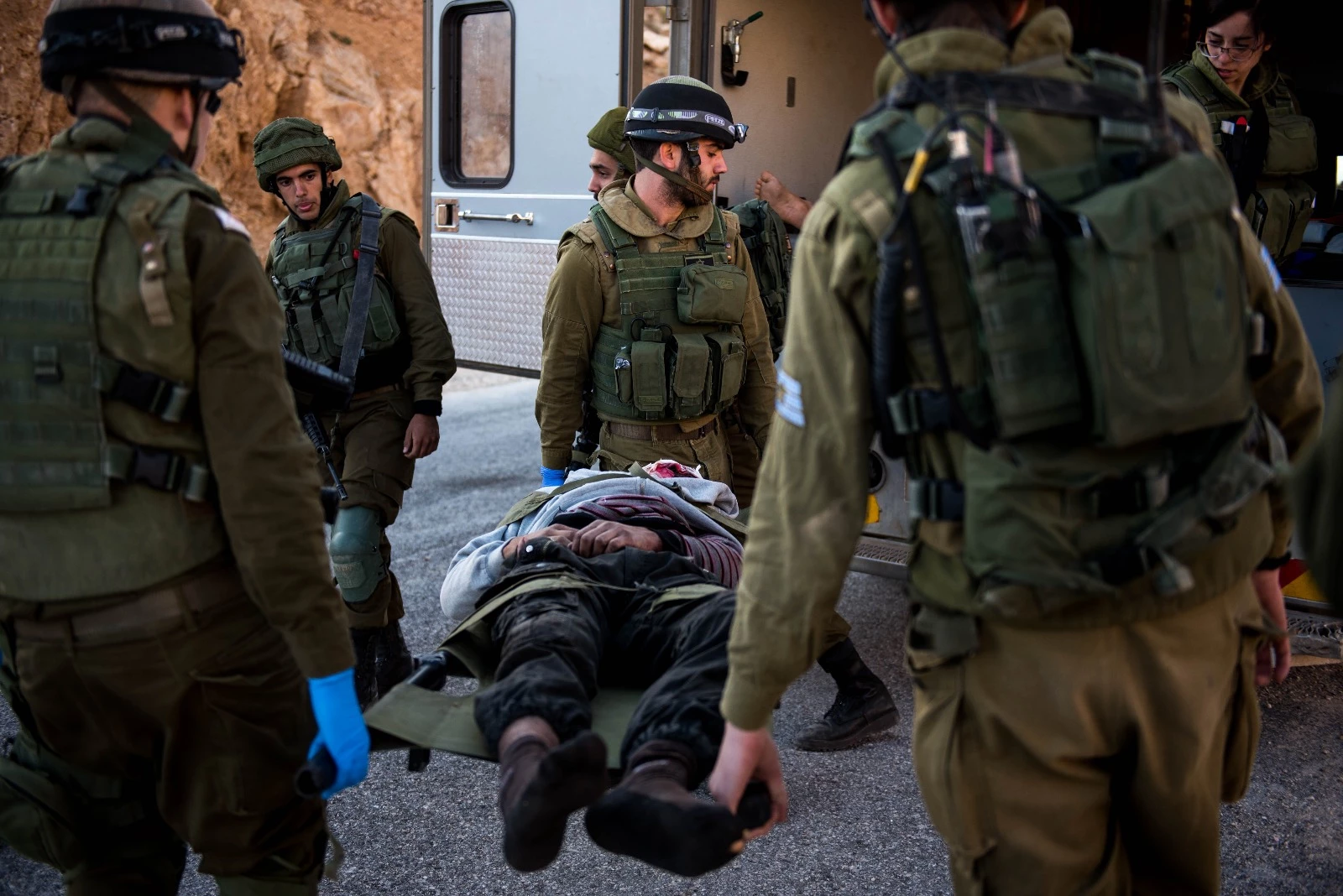
IDF soldiers carry a wounded man on a stretcher

According to the IDF, over 4,000 Syrians were brought to Israel to receive treatment, including hundreds of children.

After the outbreak of the Syrian civil war in 2011, Syrians crossed the Israel-Syria border and quietly received care at Israeli health care facilities and at temporary field hospitals along the border territory in the Golan Heights. The care included a range of trauma care, from primary closure to plastic and reconstructive surgery to reconstructive procedures for burns. Between January 2013 and December 2017, at least 963 patients received treatment at the Galilee Medical Center, which became the main location for multidisciplined medical treatment.

Medical aid enabled the crossing of hundreds of children through the border for one-day treatment, assistance in the establishment of two medical centers, the transfer of medication surfaces and items of advanced medical equipment, and the establishment of a field clinic for routine medical treatment. A clinic called Camp Ichay was established by American humanitarian organization Friendships.

In 2017, a maternity hospital was opened in the Syrian village of Bariqa, without any equipment. Following its outreach to Israel, incubators, anesthesia machines and ultrasound devices were sent. The aid was partially funded from humanitarian organizations and partly from the state budget.

In August 2017, the Mazor Ladach (meaning "Bandaging Those In Need" in Hebrew) field clinic was established in an abandoned military outpost located in Israeli-occupied southern Golan Heights, close to the border with Syria. The clinic worked in partnership with Frontier Alliance International of the united states. During its approximately one year in operation, it provided medical care to around 6,800 Syrians before its closure in August 2018.

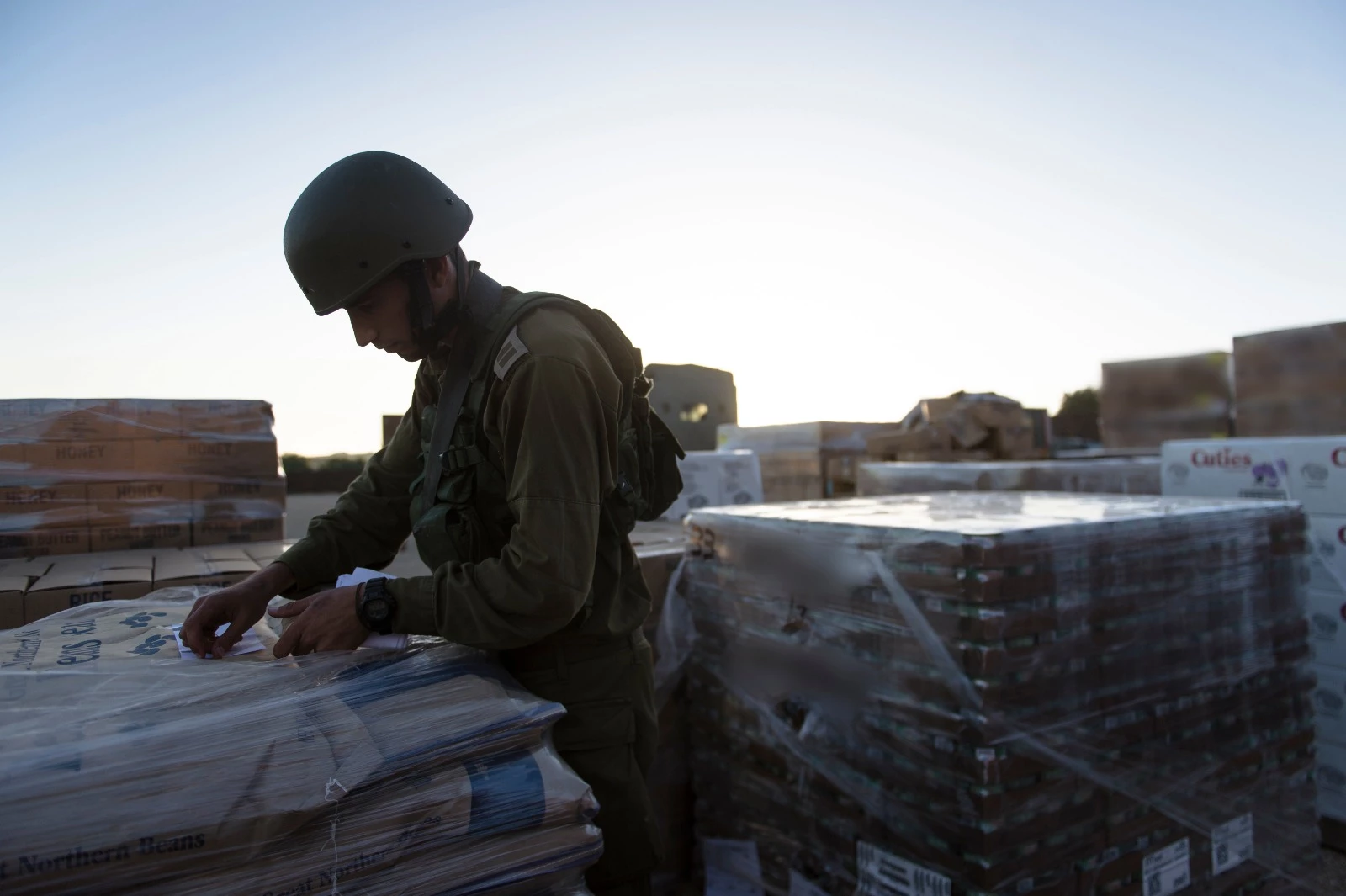
An IDF soldier handling aid supplies

Around 400 families lived in tent camps near the border and the rest had lived in villages or in open fields. About a third of the residents were displaced persons or refugees, half of whom were minors. The patients brought to Israel for treatment were mostly treated in hospitals in northern Israel, including at the Galilee Medical Center in Nahariya. and the Rebecca Sieff Hospital in Safed. The army also provided insulin for about 100 people.

In 2017, Israel began admitting women and children for day treatments in Israeli hospitals and allowed injured rebel fighters to enter Israel for treatment. In comparison, Jordan's policy disallowed their entry due to concerns about rebel offensives. Israeli facilitated the entry of non-Israeli volunteer medical professionals to Syria under the protection of an allied Syrian rebel group and facilitated by American NGO Multifaith Alliance for Syrian Refugees.

== Operation Good Neighbor ==
The directive was established in June 2016, and its first activity occurred in August of the same year. The army kept the operation confidential until announcing it in July 2017. During this period, from June 2016 to July 2017, the initiative conducted over 110 different aid operations.

The IDF relied on local contacts and operated in numerous villages near the border, primarily in the Quneitra district. As of July 2017, the primary recipients of the aid were the approximately 200,000 residents of the Hauran region.

According to the IDF, aid to Syrian civilians was motivated by both conscience and security interests. The IDF did not want to stand by in the face of the humanitarian crisis in Syria, and aid could create a less hostile environment across the border.

Brig. Gen. Yaniv Asor of the IDF did not perceive the aid operations as hindering their mandate to guard the Golan Heights border. He considered them a significant aspect of his defense approach with operational impact. According to Asor's explanation, the civilian aid created better neighborly relations, which helped prevent terrorist activity. It was also expected to aid in restraining and repelling hostile elements along the border.

=== Civil assistance and infrastructure ===
Aid from Israel was originally provided via the United Nations and other agencies. In 2016, it began appearing with Hebrew packaging. Israeli increased the flow of humanitarian aid into southern Syria, including Daraa and Quneitra in early 2018. Aid included construction materials and hospital and school supplies.

Under the initiative of Operation Good Neighbor, a significant amount of humanitarian aid was delivered, including medical supplies, food, fuel, and clothing. According to the IDF, as part of the operation, 450,000 liters of fuel for heating, operating water wells, and bakeries' ovens were transferred to Syria. It also claims to have supplied seven generators, water pipes for Syrian infrastructure reconstruction, and equipment for a temporary school in the region.

=== Aid to Syrian rebels ===
Brig. Gen. Yaniv Asor of the IDF stated that the army was not providing funding inside Syria, but his statement contradicted a report from The Wall Street Journal, which mentions a local rebel leader claiming that Israel had secretly offered and provided cash, food, fuel, medical supplies, and even monthly stipends to Syrian rebels. The report highlighted that Israel's support to the groups was relatively small compared to aid supplied by Qatar, Saudi Arabia, Turkey, and the United States.

According to foreign reports, the objective behind Israel providing weapons and financial support to rebel groups in Operation Good Neighbor was to deter troops affiliated with Hezbollah, Iran and ISIS from approaching Israel's border.

== Disclosure ==
On 19 July 2017, Israeli publicly unveiled the scope of its aid activities during the war. According to Israel, it had delivered more than 360 tons of food, 90 tons of clothes, and items such as generators.

== Closure ==
On September 13, 2018, the IDF announced the closure of Operation Good Neighbor following the return of the Assad government to power in the entirety of southern Syria and along the de facto border with Israel, including in the Syrian-administered part of the Golan Heights.
