= Saad Haddad =

Founder of the South Lebanon Army

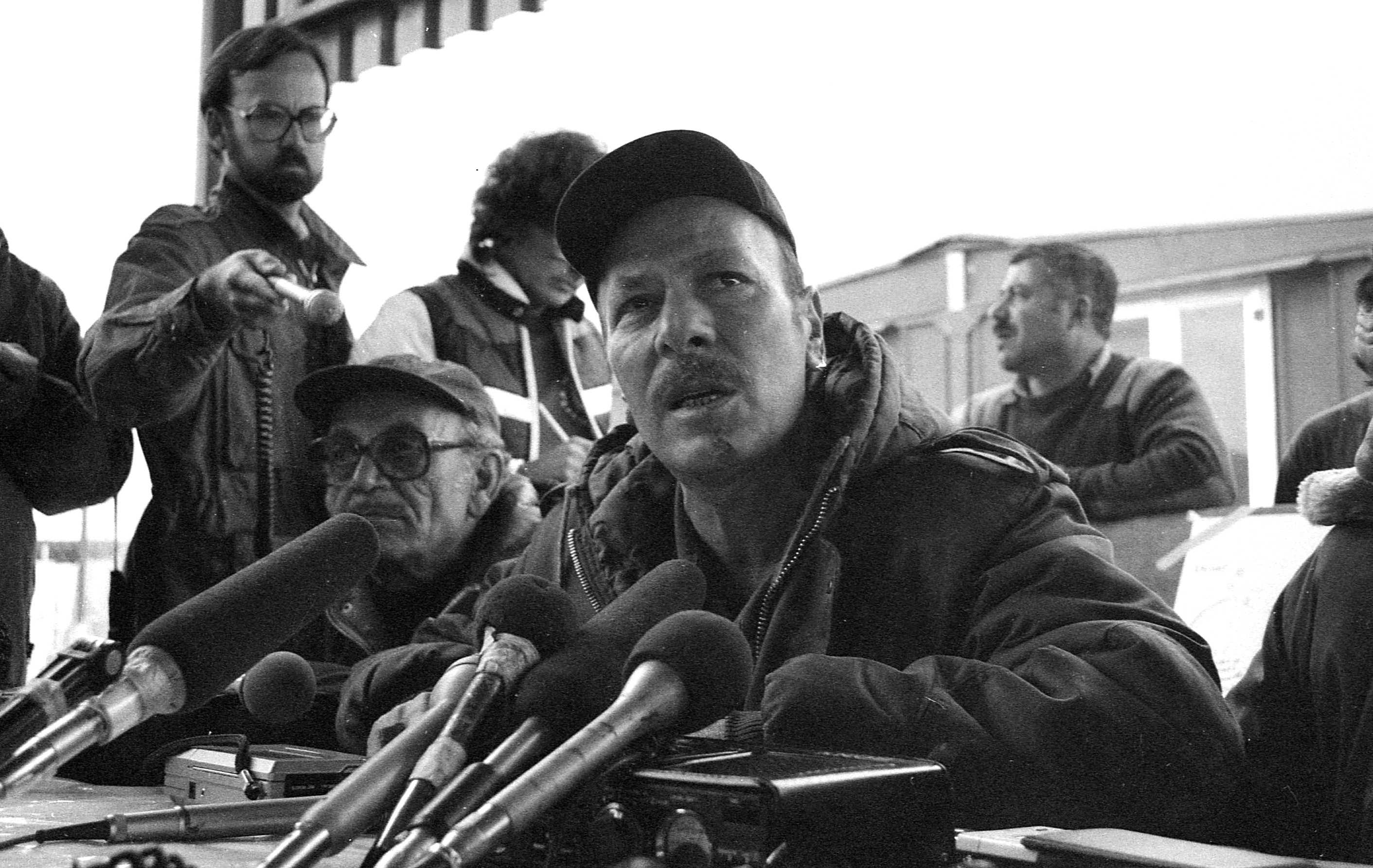
- Haddad at a 1981 press conference

President of the State of Free Lebanon
- In office 18 April 1979 – 14 January 1984
- Preceded by: Position established
- Succeeded by: Position abolished Antoine Lahad (as Administrator of the South Lebanon security belt administration and of the South Lebanon Security Zone)

Personal details
- Born: 1936 Marjayoun, French Lebanon
- Died: 14 January 1984 (aged 47–48) Marjayoun, Lebanon
- Children: 1
- Occupation: Military officer
- Religion: Greek Catholic

Military service
- Allegiance: Lebanon; Free Lebanon State
- Branch/service: Lebanese Army; Army of Free Lebanon; South Lebanon Army
- Battles/wars: Lebanese Civil War

Saad Haddad (Arabic: سعد حداد; 1936 – 14 January 1984) was a Lebanese military officer and the founder and head of the South Lebanon Army (SLA) during the Lebanese Civil War. Originally a Major in the Lebanese Army, he defected and formed the SLA and created the separatist State of Free Lebanon backed by Israel. For years Haddad was widely identified as a Zionist and closely collaborated with and received arms and political support from Israel against Lebanese government forces, Hezbollah, and the Syrian Army. Haddad died of cancer in his house in Marjayoun.

== Early life ==
Haddad was born to a Greek Catholic family in Marjayoun. He received part of his training at Fort Benning in the United States.

== Lebanese Civil War ==
During the 1970s, there was a cyclical pattern of guerrilla attacks carried out by Palestinian militants on Israel and by the Israel Defense Forces on Palestinian targets in Lebanon. After the outbreak of the Lebanese Civil War, Lebanese-generated security concerns grew for Israel. At the same time, the breakdown of Lebanon's central government provided opportunities for Israel to act. Around 1975, Israel sponsored the creation of a surrogate force, Lebanese Christian (Melkite) Major Saad Haddad was the first officer to defect from the Lebanese Army to ally himself with Israel, a defection which led to the formation of the pro-Israel Free Lebanon Army, based in a corridor, the "Security Zone" along Lebanon's southern border from 1982 after Israel's invasion of Lebanon. This force, which called itself the Free Lebanon Army (but was later renamed the South Lebanon Army (SLA) under leader Antoine Lahad in May 1980), was intended to prevent infiltration into Israel of Palestinian guerrillas. In 1978, Israel invaded Lebanon, clearing out Palestine Liberation Organization (PLO) strongholds as far north as the Litani River.

On 18 April 1979, Haddad proclaimed the area controlled by his force Independent Free Lebanon. The following day, he was branded a traitor to the Lebanese government and officially dismissed from the Lebanese Army.

Another consequence of the Israeli invasion was the establishment in southern Lebanon of the United Nations Interim Force in Lebanon, whose mission was to separate the various combatants. Haddad's militia collaborated with Israel and received the bulk of its arms, equipment, supplies and ordnance from Israel. There are eyewitness accounts that support the claim that Saad Haddad's troops were involved in the massacres of Sabra and Shatila in 1982. In the massacre an estimated 763 - 3,500 civilians were killed. Though Hadad and his men were exonerated by an Israeli panel, the SLA was still known to engage in ruthless behavior, such as the "brutal conditions" of Palestinian and Lebanese prisoners at the infamous al-Khiam prison.

During the last few years of his life, Saad Haddad headed the Christian radio station "Voice of Hope", initially set up and funded by George Otis of High Adventure Ministries. In 1984, Haddad died of cancer. His successor as the head of the SLA was general Antoine Lahad.

== Legacy ==
A statue of Haddad was erected in his hometown of Marjayoun. The statue was torn down in May 2000 by Hezbollah following Israel's withdrawal from South Lebanon and the collapse of the South Lebanese Army.

== Descendants ==
On 7 June 2012, Lebanese daily newspaper As Safir reported on the progress of Saad Haddad's daughter Arza (meaning "Cedar Tree" in Arabic) (born 1980 or 1981) as a researcher in ballistics and rocket science at the Technion University in Haifa. She obtained a master's degree in aeronautics in June 2012.
