= Israel Shield =

Israel Shield (Hebrew: מגן ישראל) was Israel's national program to combat the COVID-19 pandemic. Spearheaded by the Ministry of Health, it is led by a "COVID czar," a position that, from June 2021, was held by Salman Zarka. The institution of the program coincided with the absorption of the March 2020 Emergency directives to fight the Coronavirus into the July 2020 Special powers to deal with the new Coronavirus legislation (also known informally as the "Great Coronavirus Law").

== The COVID czar ==
Subordinate to the Minister of Health and to the ministry's director, the COVID czar directly consulted with the Prime Minister. The COVID czar's recommendations generally received wide publicity in the press. All three COVID czars had been doctors who had previously held prominent public health roles.

In June 2021, Salman Zarka, was appointed by the Minister of Health, Nitzan Horowitz, replacing Nachman Ash, with the latter becoming the ministry's director. In November 2020, Ash, himself, had replaced the first COVID czar, Ronni Gamzu, who was originally appointed to the position in July of that year.

The COVID czar was not a member of the Coronavirus Cabinet, unlike the Minister of Health and ministry's director who are permanent members.
