= Fatima Gate =

Former border crossing between Israel and Lebanon

Coordinates: 33°16′50.04″N 35°33′52.68″E

Fatima Gate, also known as the Good Fence Crossing, is a former border crossing between Lebanon and Israel. On the Lebanese side, it is close to the village of Kfar Kila and on the Israeli side, it is west of Metula. The crossing has been closed since the Israeli withdrawal from Lebanon at the end of the 1982-2000 South Lebanon conflict, and since the summer of 2000 has been the site of many anti-Israeli demonstrations and cross-border stone throwing from Lebanon to Israel.

== See also ==
- Blue Line
