= Galilee Medical Center =

Hospital in Nahariya, Israel

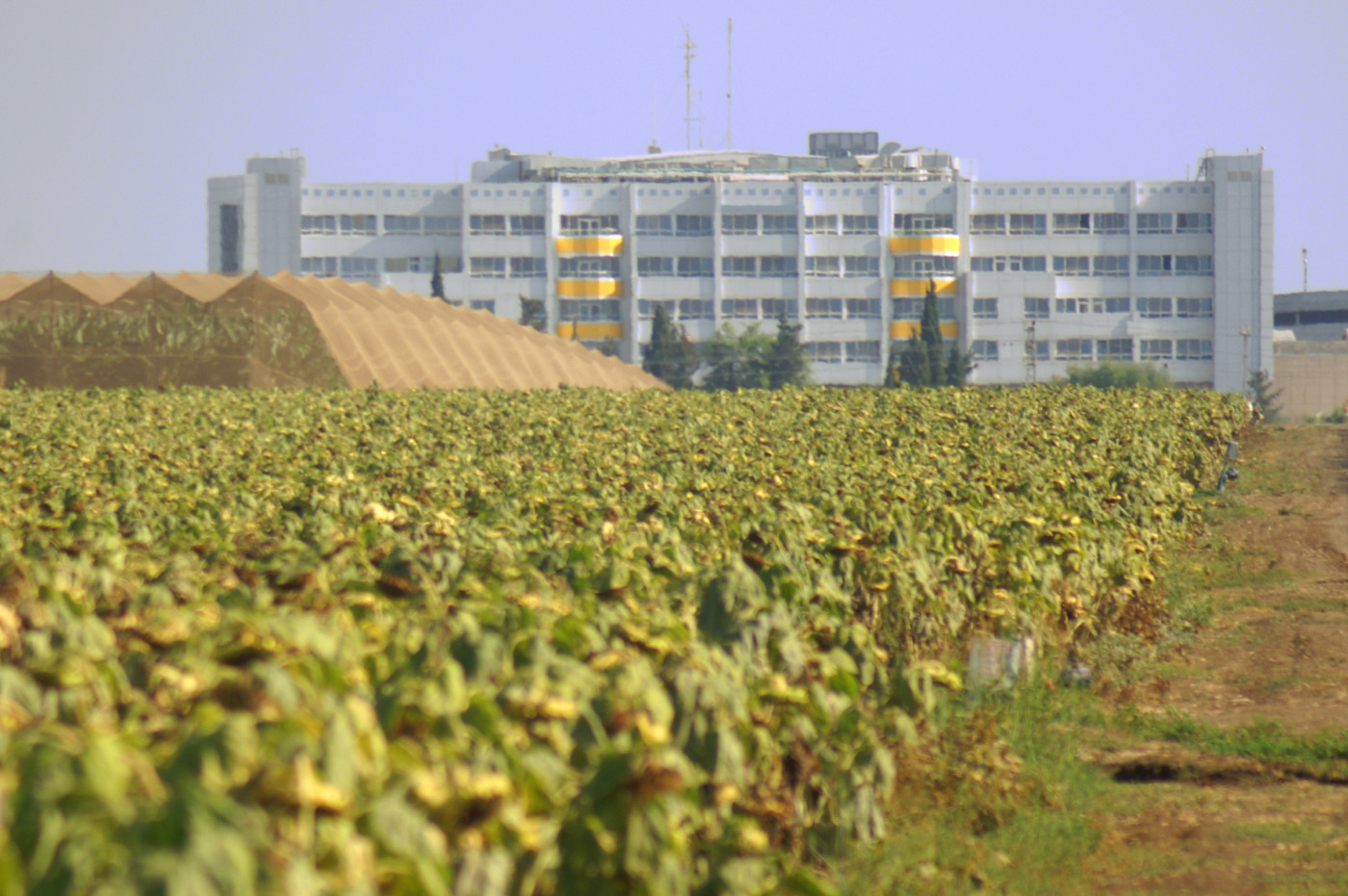

Geography
- Location: Nahariya, Israel
- Coordinates: 33°00′34″N 35°07′00″E

Organisation
- Type: General hospital

Services
- Emergency department: Yes
- Beds: 722

History
- Founded: 1956

Links
- Website: www.gmc.org.il

Galilee Medical Center (Hebrew: המרכז הרפואי לגליל, HaMerkaz HaRefu'i LaGalil), abbreviated GMC, is a hospital located in the coastal city of Nahariya and is the second largest hospital in northern Israel (after Rambam Hospital in Haifa). It was established in 1956.

The hospital located on the outskirts of Nahariya, three kilometers from the city center, serving half a million residents of the western Galilee, from Karmiel to the coast.

== History ==
The Galilee Medical Center is authorized to operate 763 beds, although on average only 622 are used. The emergency department receives about 400 people every day and the number of hospitalizations is about 60,000 a year. Approximately 420 physicians practice in this government owned hospital, while the total number of employees is about 2200. The hospital staff is a reflection of the multi-ethnic demography of the Western Galilee, consisting of Jews, Muslims, Christians, Druze and others. In 2007, the Western Galilee Hospital was the first to appoint an Arab Israeli, Dr. Masad Barhoum, as its director.

Located in close proximity to Israel's northern border with Lebanon, the hospital's main area of expertise is trauma: IDF soldiers, Israeli civilians, UN personnel and civilians from neighboring Arab countries.

Before 2000, approximately one-third of the patients in the ophthalmology department were Lebanese citizens who crossed the border through the Good Fence and received treatment free of charge.

In summer of 2006, during the 2006 Lebanon War, the hospital handled the largest number of casualties in Israel. During the month-long war, some 1,800 civilians and 300 airlifted IDF soldiers were treated there. During this time, the hospital took a direct hit that destroyed an outer wall and eight rooms. Since then, the hospital has built an underground emergency department, partly funded by overseas donors.

Since the beginning of the Syrian war in 2013, the Galilee Medical Center has treated more than 1600 victims of this ongoing civil carnage, making it one of the leading institutions in Israel experienced in treating complex war injuries

== See also ==
- Health care in Israel
