= Metula =

Town in Israel

Metula מטולה
- Local council

Hebrew transcription(s)
  - ISO 259: Mṭulla
  - Also spelled: Metulla (unofficial)
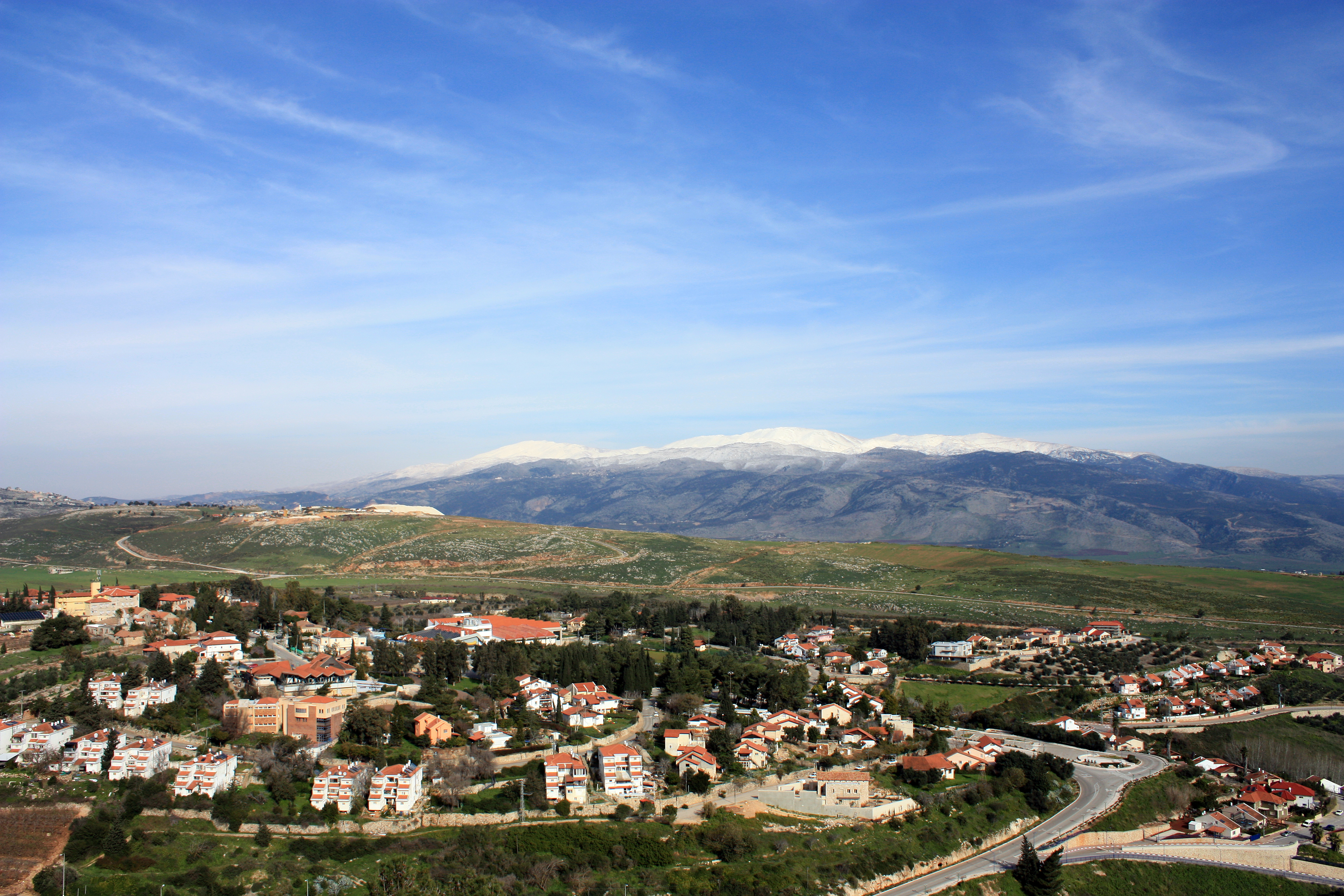
- View of Metula

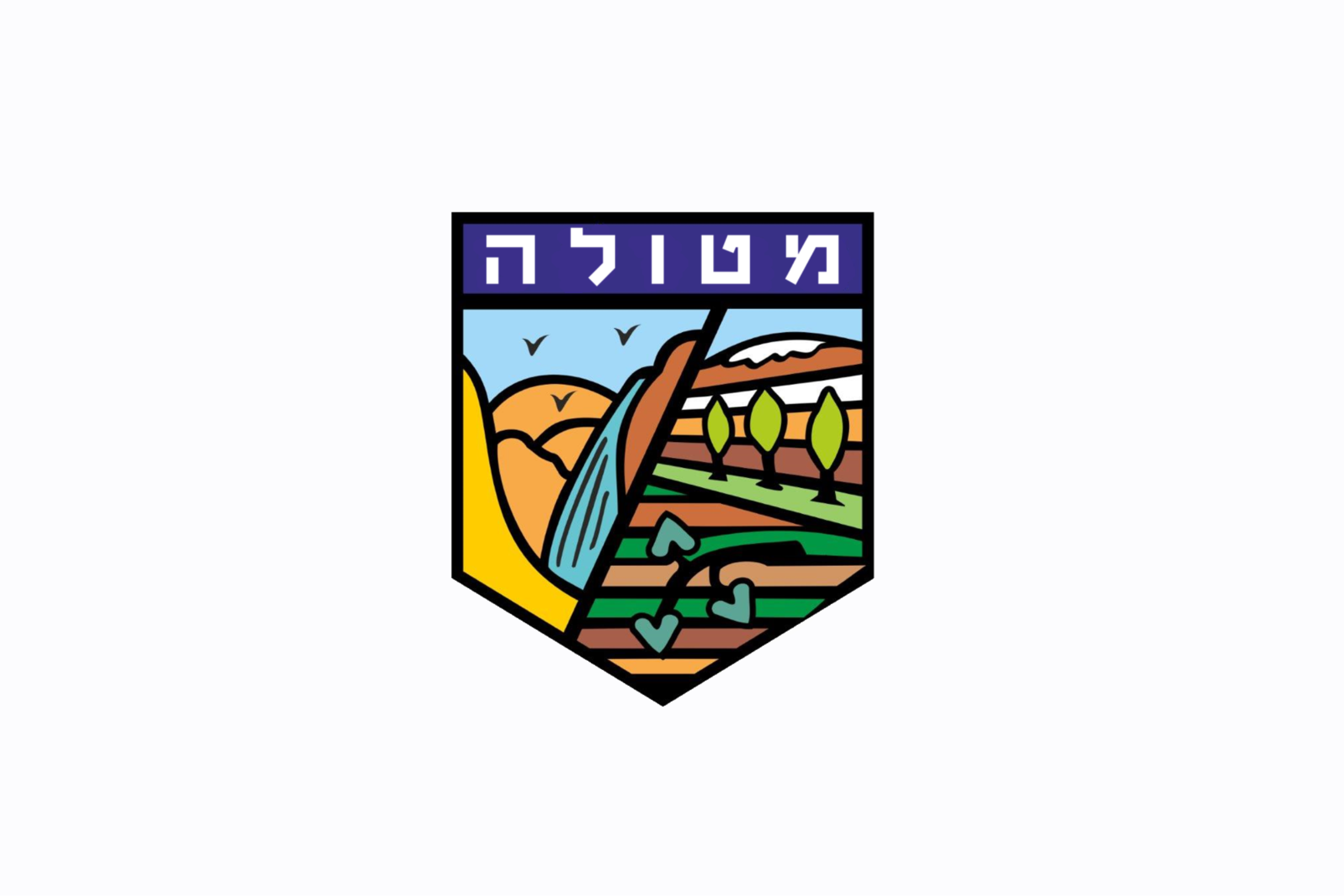
- Flag

- Location within Northeast Israel Location within Israel
- Coordinates: 33°16′44″N 35°34′28″E
- Country: Israel
- District: Northern
- Subdistrict: Safed
- Natural Region: Hula Valley
- Founded: 1896; 130 years ago

Government
  - Head of Municipality: David Azulai

Area
  - Total: 9,413 dunams (9.413 km^{2}; 3.634 sq mi)

Population (2024)
  - Total: 2,248
  - Density: 238.8/km^{2} (618.5/sq mi)
- Name meaning: "Belle vue"
- Website: www.metulla.muni.il

Metula (Hebrew: מטולה) is a town in the Northern District of Israel. It abuts the Israel-Lebanon border, and had a population of 2,248 in 2024.

== Etymology ==
The Hebrew name מטולה, Metula, is derived from the Arabic: المطلة, romanized: al-Muṭallah, lit. 'the lookout' (see #Ottoman period).

== History ==
=== Bronze and Iron Age ===
Metula is located near the sites of the biblical cities of Dan, Abel Beth Maacah, and Ijon.

=== Roman and Byzantine periods ===
A settlement existed in the area in the Roman and Byzantine periods. Ancient wine presses and a mosaic pavement have been found here. A tomb excavated in 1967 contained at least four graves dating from between the late third century and the late sixth century.

=== Ottoman period ===
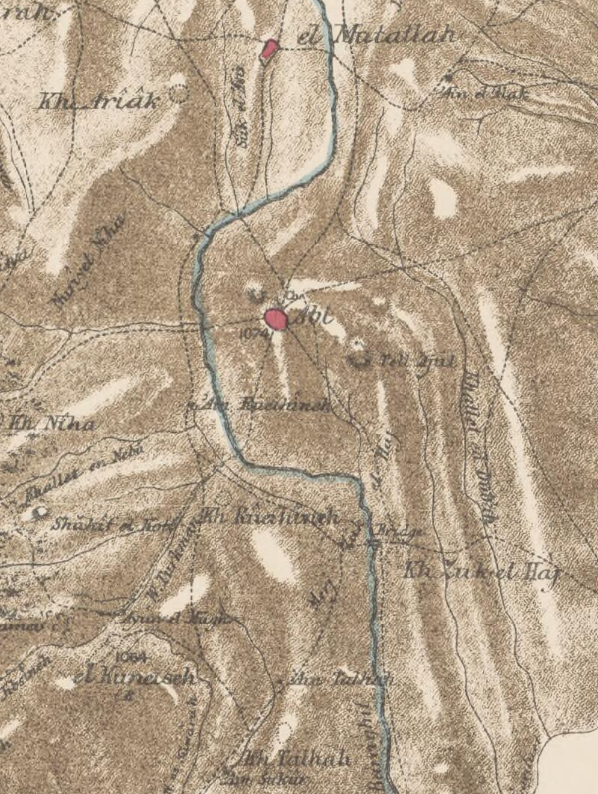
el Mutallah, 1878

The origin of the town's name is Arabic: المطلة, romanized: al-Muṭallah, lit. 'the lookout'. In 1816, the notable traveller James Silk Buckingham visited "a large village, called Metully, altogether inhabited by Druzes". In 1875, Victor Guérin described Methelleh or Metelleh as a village with a spring, occupied by Druzes from the Hauran who cultivated a garden to the east. Soon afterwards, in 1881, the Palestine Exploration Fund's Survey of Western Palestine recorded "El Mutallah: A small village, built of stone, containing about 100 Druzes, situated on slope of hill, near a large stream, surrounded by arable land."

Aryeh L. Avneri writes that the village had previously been Christian, but the inhabitants had to flee during the 1860 civil conflict between the Christians and Druze of Mount Lebanon, with Druze families from Beit Meri being accepted by Jabur Bey as tenant farmers to Mutalla after the war.

==== Founding of the Jewish moshava ====
When the Druze rebellion of 1895 broke out the men of Mutallah joined its ranks. Since the women were not able to cope with the work, the owner of the land, a Christian from Sidon known as Jabur Bey, sold 12,800 dunams of land to Baron de Rothschild's chief officer Joshua Ossovetski. It had been inhabited and cultivated by more than 600 Druze tenant farmers. When the Druze Rebellion was put down, the men returned and demanded their tenancy rights back. Ossovetski called in the Turkish authorities, who came to arrest the Druse as deserters and rebels, while Ossovetski offered them compensation to leave the land. Many were dissatisfied with the amount offered and eight years of feuds and violent clashes ensued. Eventually an agreement was reached between the villagers and the Jewish Colonization Association in 1904 for an additional payment of 60,000 francs (3,000 Turkish pounds). This episode brought much criticism of the methods of Rothschild's agents, including some from other Zionists such as Ahad Ha'am. The Druze moved to other Druze-inhabited villages, including Isfiya on Mount Carmel.

The Jewish moshava settlement was founded in June 1896 by 60 farming families from more established settlements and 20 families of non-farming professions. Most of the founders were immigrants from Russia. Pioneers (halutzim) from Petah Tikva also joined in settling Metula, as did some religious scholars from Safed.

=== Mandatory period ===
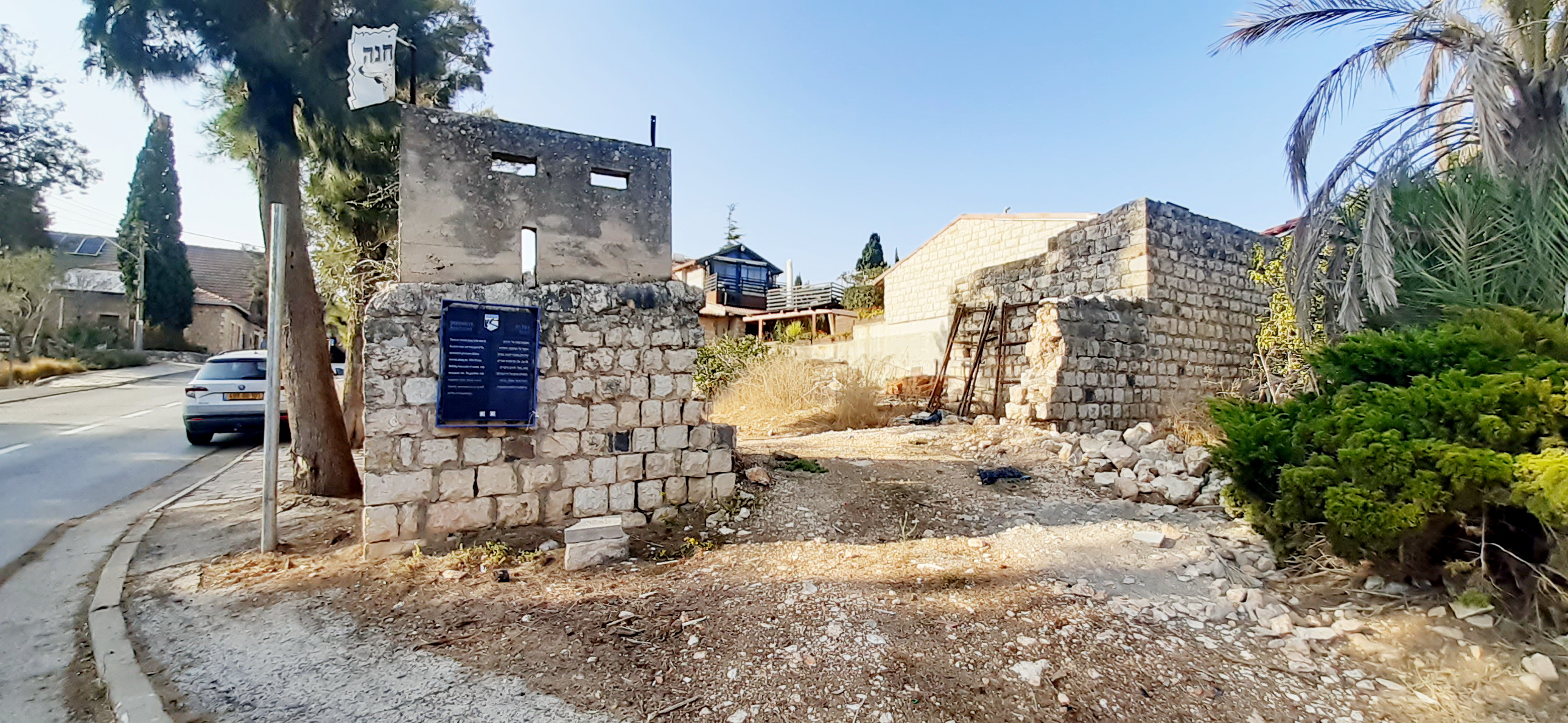
A defensive position in Metula used during the 1936–1939 Arab revolt and the 1948 Palestine war

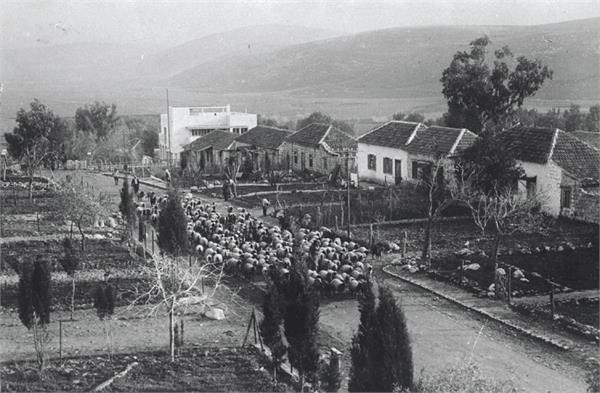
Metula in 1937

At the end of World War I, Metula was in the area of French military occupation. The British traveller Norman Bentwich wrote in 1919:

Metullah, the most northern outpost, is acquiring a new function as a summer resort for the rest of the country. Its mountain air and its splendid site, high up above a ravine, down which a stream dashes headlong to Jordan, makes it a chosen place in the dry days, and already its few homesteads are crowded in July and August. Metullah is a summer station for the hardy men and women of the colonies; it lies too far from the high road to attract the tourist, but in course of time it, or some other place in the highland region, will become for the Jewish dwellers of the lowlands what a number of hill stations in the Lebanon are already to the Syrians of the plains.

The 1920 boundary agreement between Britain and France stated that Metula was to be in Palestine, but it was not until 1924 that the change to British control was complete. During the intervening years, the residents of Metula even took part in elections for the Lebanese parliament.

==== Destruction of the Nahal Ayun Bridge ====
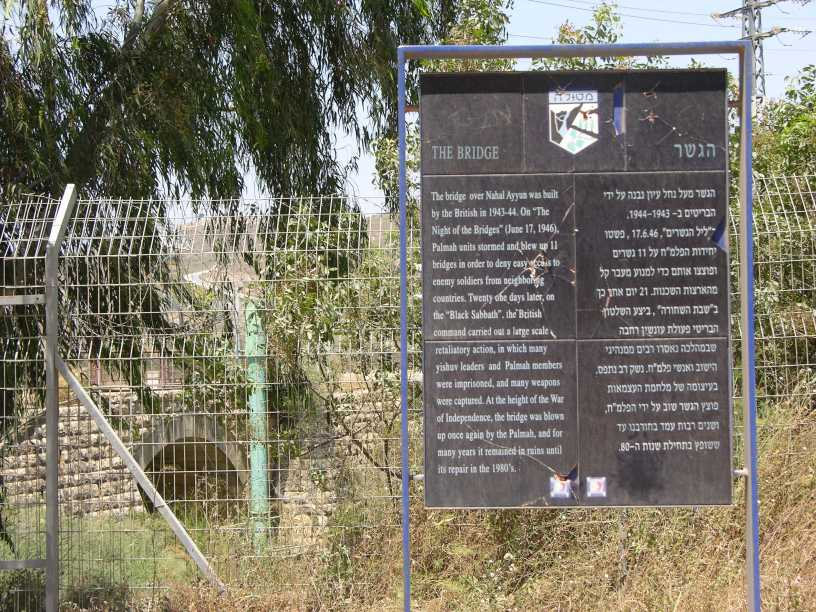
Nahal Ayun Bridge

The bridge over Nahal Ayun was built by the British in the years 1943–44. On June 17, 1946, as part of the night of the bridges, all four Palmach battalions (elite units of the Haganah) captured and destroyed 11 border bridges, including the Nahal Ayun bridge in Metula. As a consequence, on June 29, 1946 ("Black Sabbath"), the British soldiers imprisoned many Yishuv leaders and Palmach members. The bridge was blown up again by the Palmach during the War of Independence. It was repaired in the 1980s.

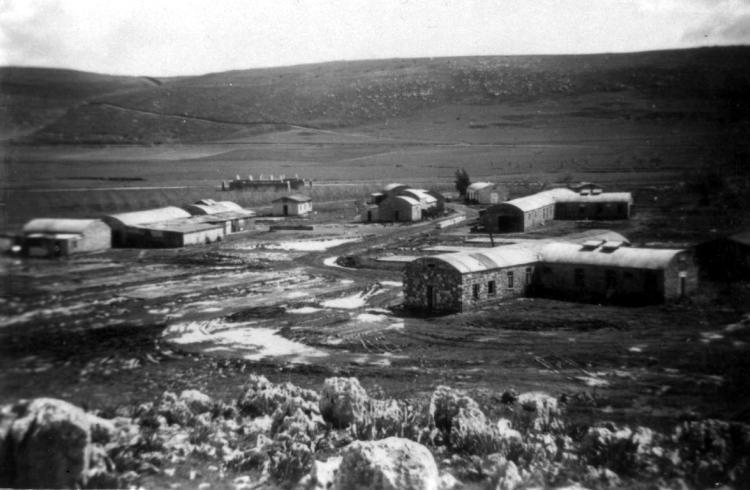
British army camp in Metula, 1948

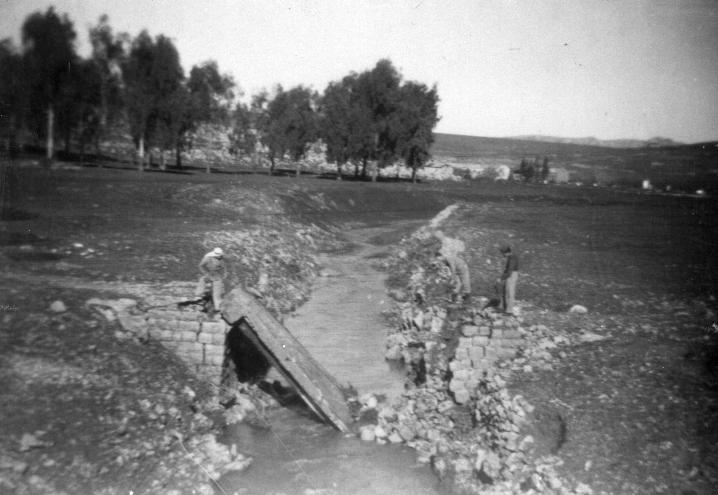
The bridge over Nahal Ayun after being blown up, 15 February 1948

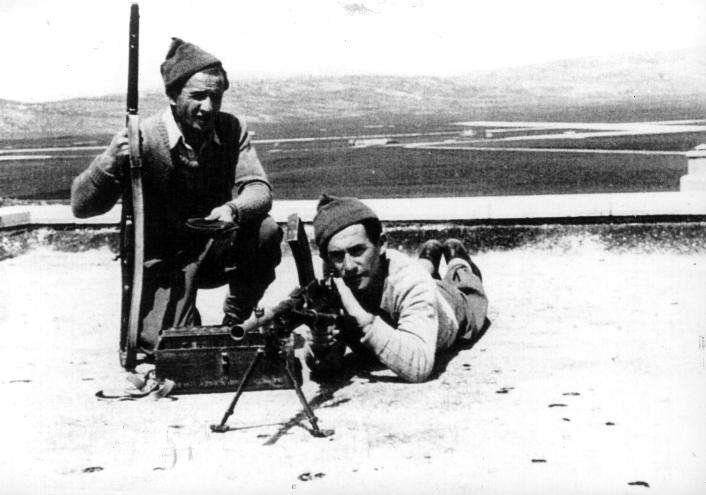
Members of Yiftach Brigade (which blew up the bridge)

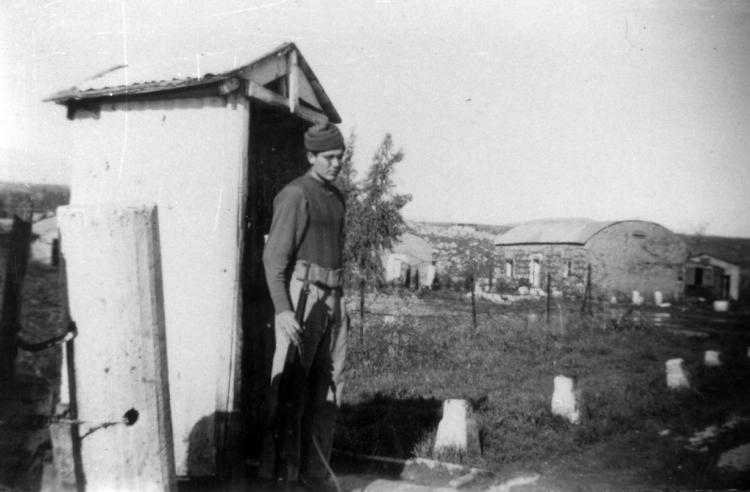
Metula camp after Yiftach Brigade takeover, 1948

=== State of Israel ===
In Israel, Metula is known as a wealthy town popular as a tourist destination, especially for schoolchildren on summer vacation.

==== The "Good Fence" (1976–2000) ====
The Good Fence (הגדר הטובה, HaGader HaTova or Fatima Crossing) was a border crossing from Metula to Lebanon; it opened in 1976, and was closed in 2000 after Israel's withdrawal from Lebanon. The border crossing had allowed Lebanese to find jobs in northern Israel, access health services, attend school, and transport goods.

==== 1985 attack ====
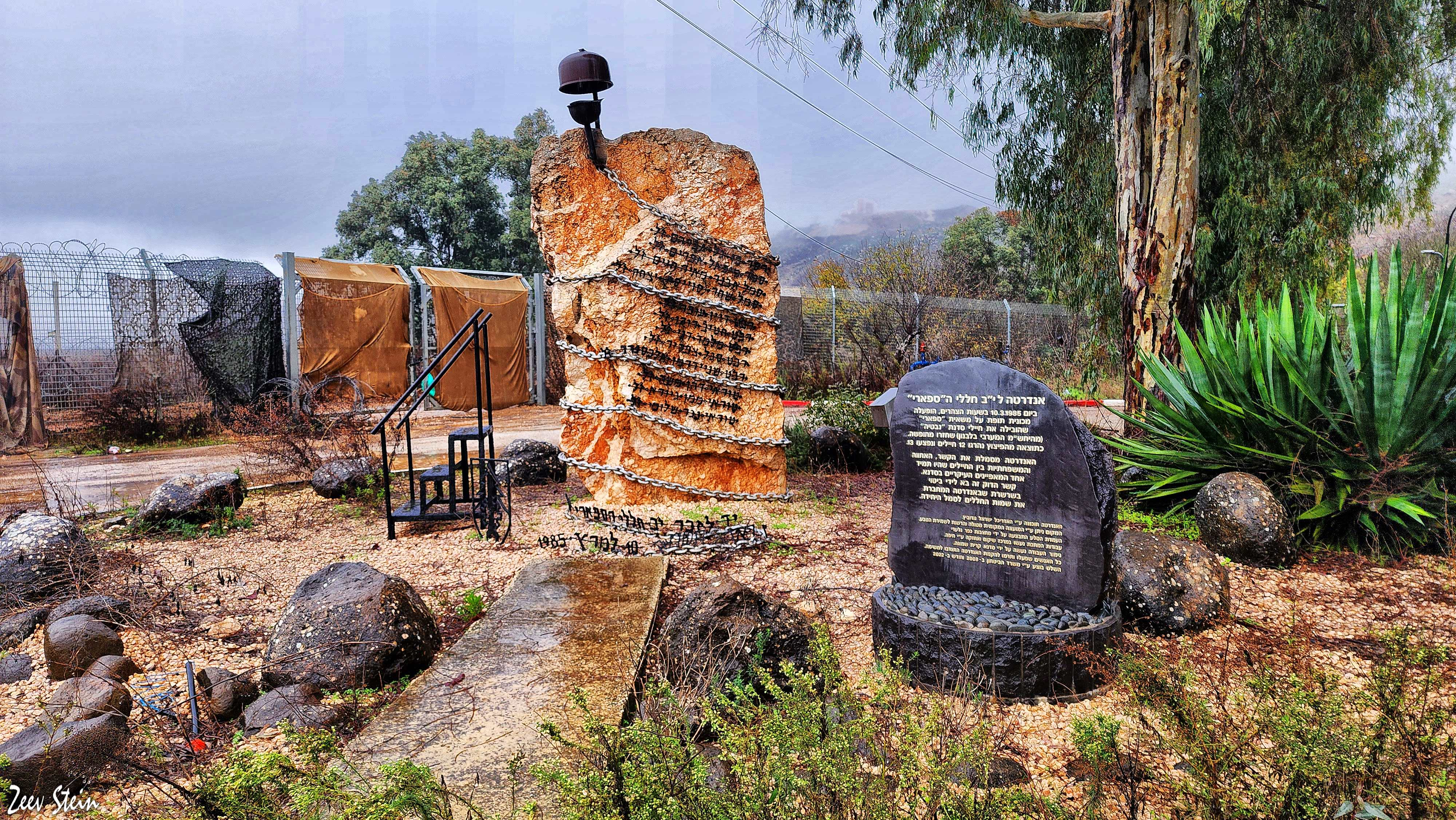
Safari Disaster Memorial site

The Safari Disaster occurred during the South Lebanon conflict (1985–2000). On the afternoon of Sunday, March 10, 1985, a convoy of Israel Defense Forces (IDF) soldiers in "Safari" model trucks were driving from Metula towards the Lebanese town of Marjayoun. Dozens of soldiers, having just attended Shabbat, were on their way back to duty. In accordance with regulations, one armed jeep in the forefront and two in the rear, and helmets and bullet-proof vests were worn.

As they were crossing the narrow bridge over Nahal Ayun at 13:45 a red Chevrolet pickup truck drove towards them. The soldiers of the first jeep noticed that the driver had friendly smile, and he was signaled to pull over to let the convoy pass. The first jeep and the first safari truck did so. At 13:50 the driver of the Chevrolet detonated a tremendous explosion which shattered windows in Metula itself. Twelve soldiers were killed and 14 wounded.

==== 2006 Lebanon War ====
During the 2006 Lebanon War, Metula became a temporary ghost town when its populace fled Hezbollah rocket fire. It was hit by 120 rockets during the war.

==== Israel–Lebanon conflict (2023–present) ====
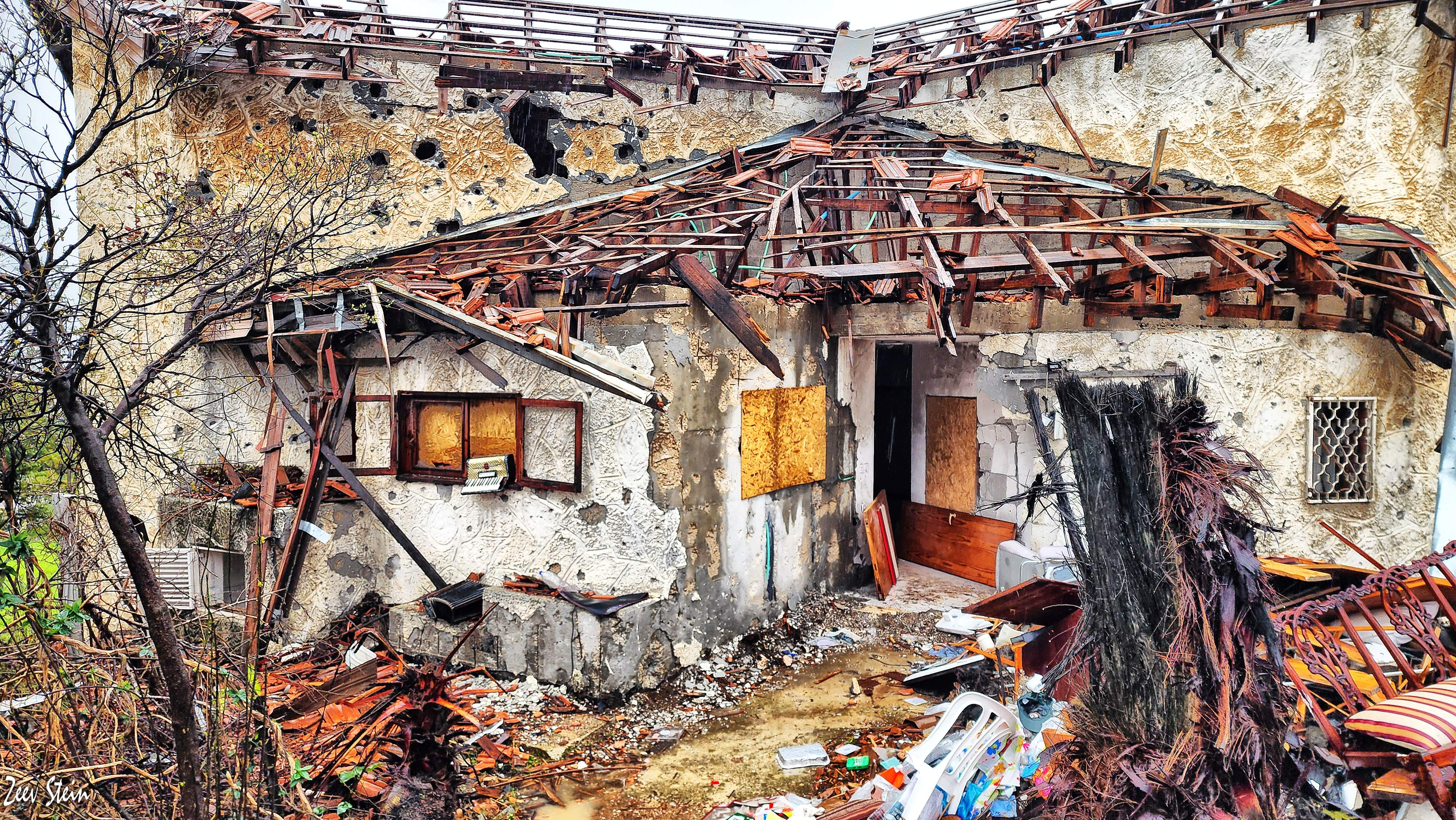
House damaged by a Hezbollah attack during the Gaza war

In the midst of the Gaza war, Hezbollah attacked northern Israeli border communities with rockets and missiles, prompting the evacuation of several, including Metula. On October 17, 2023, a Hezbollah anti-tank missile struck Metula, resulting in the injury of one civilian and two IDF reservists. On 19 December, Hezbollah fired artillery shells at the town.

On 30 September, 2024, the IDF launched a ground invasion into Southern Lebanon. On that same day, the IDF declared that Metula became a closed military area. On 23 October, 2024, 4 foreign workers and one Israeli were killed from a direct Hezbollah rocket strike, with several more seriously wounded.

== Geography ==
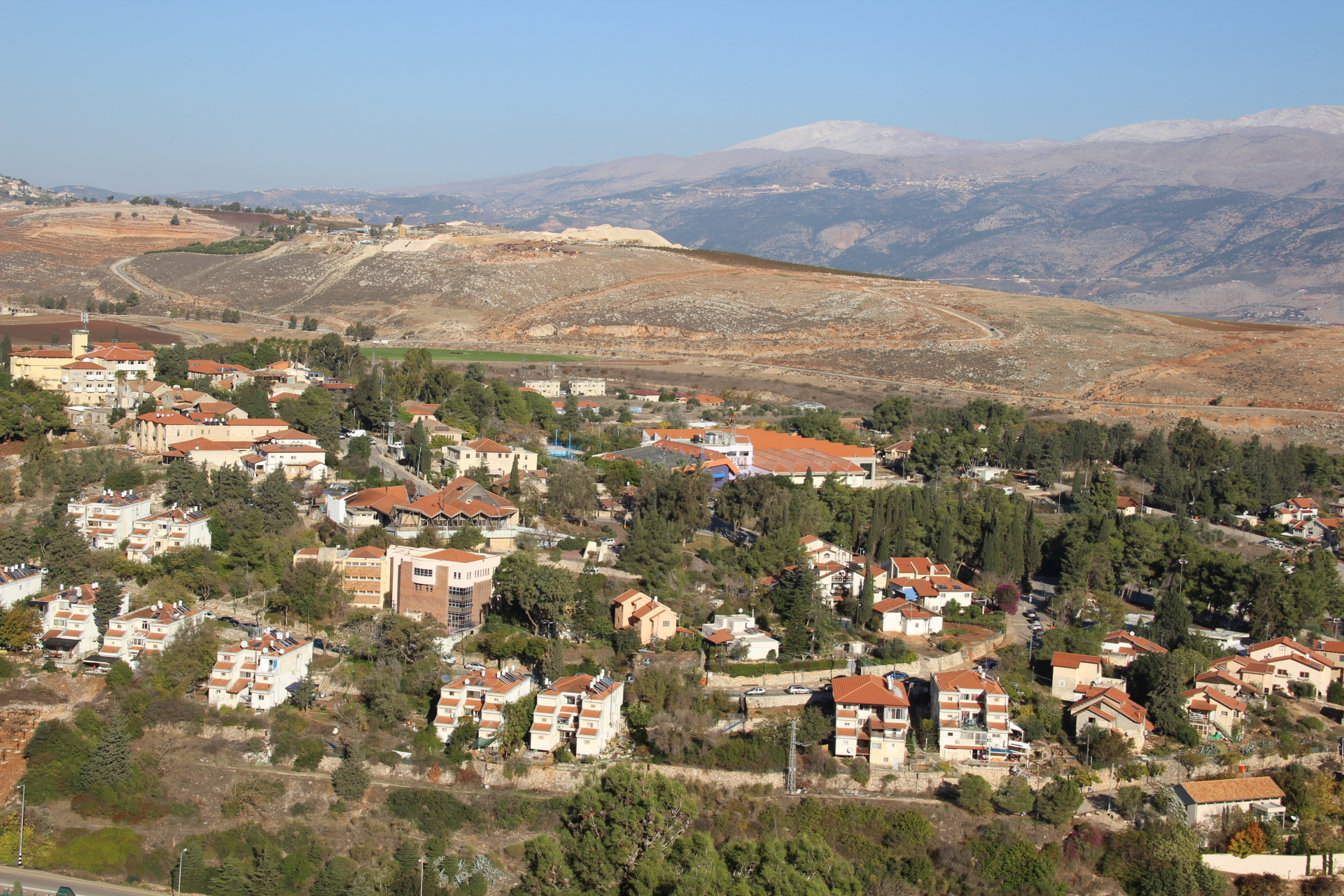
Metula in 2017

Metula lies in the northernmost point of Israel, next to the Lebanese border and at 520 m above sea level.

Maps of the Geological Survey of Israel show that the area around Metula is primarily composed of sedimentary rock units from the Jurassic to Eocene periods. It is significantly impacted by faulting, particularly related to the Dead Sea Rift, which creates a complex geological structure.

According to Israel’s Meteorological Service, Metula is characterized by a warm-summer Mediterranean climate: Summers are typically very warm and dry, and winters are cool and wet. Rain periods generally occur from October through May, and the average annual rainfall is 800-900 mm (31-35 inches). Occasionally Metula experiences brief winter snows.

== Demographics ==
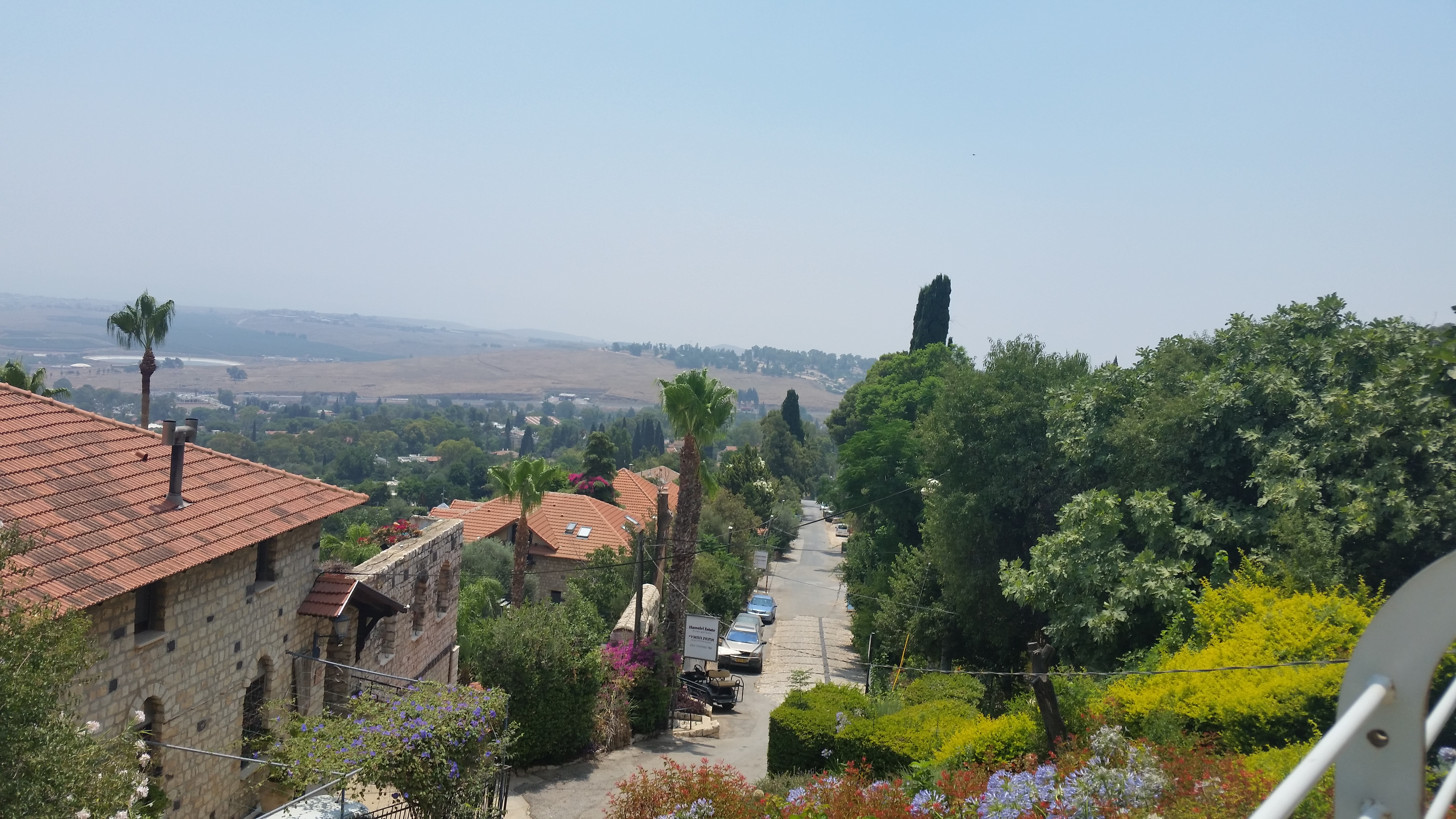
Street in Metula

According to the Israel Central Bureau of Statistics (CBS), in September 2003 Metula had a population of 1,400, predominantly Jewish. Metula was declared a local council in 1949. Also according to the CBS, the population over the years was:

- 1948 – 172
- 1961 – 261
- 1972 – 333
- 1983 – 589
- 1995 – 942
- 2008 – 1,500
- 2024 – 2,248

== Notable residents ==
- Nancy Caroline (1944-2002), American-born physician and pioneer in emergency medical services
- Olga Danilov (born 1973), Olympic speed skater
- Alexandra Zaretsky (born 1987), ice dancer
- Roman Zaretsky (born 1983), ice dancer

== Bibliography ==
- Alexandre, Yardenna (2008-12-30). "Metulla Final Report". Hadashot Arkheologiyot – Excavations and Surveys in Israel (121).
- Avneri, Aryeh L. (1984). The Claim of Dispossession: Jewish Land-settlement and the Arabs, 1878–1948. Transaction Publishers. pp. 96-98. ISBN 0-87855-964-7.
- Bentwich, N. (1919). Palestine of the Jews: past, present and future. London: K. Paul, Trench, Trubner.
- Biger, Gideon (2004). The boundaries of modern Palestine, 1840-1947. Routledge. ISBN 978-0-7146-5654-0.
- Buckingham, J.S. (1825). Travels among the Arab Tribes inhabiting the countries east of Syria and Palestine…. London: Longman, Hurst, Rees, Orme, Brown and Green.
- Conder, C.R.; Kitchener, H.H. (1881). The Survey of Western Palestine: Memoirs of the Topography, Orography, Hydrography, and Archaeology. Vol. 1. London: Committee of the Palestine Exploration Fund.
- Dauphin, C. (1998). La Palestine byzantine, Peuplement et Populations. BAR International Series 726 (in French). Vol. III : Catalogue. Oxford: Archeopress. ISBN 0-860549-05-4.
- Guérin, V. (1880). Description Géographique Historique et Archéologique de la Palestine (in French). Vol. 3: Galilee, pt. 2. Paris: L'Imprimerie Nationale.
- Hadawi, S. (1970). Village Statistics of 1945: A Classification of Land and Area ownership in Palestine. Palestine Liberation Organization Research Center.
- Jaffe, Gilad Bezal'el (2010-02-28). "Metulla Final Report". Hadashot Arkheologiyot – Excavations and Surveys in Israel (122).
- Mills, E., ed. (1932). Census of Palestine 1931. Population of Villages, Towns and Administrative Areas. Jerusalem: Government of Palestine.
- Morris, B. (2001). Righteous Victims. Vintage. ISBN 0-679-42120-3.
- Palmer, E.H. (1881). The Survey of Western Palestine: Arabic and English Name Lists Collected During the Survey by Lieutenants Conder and Kitchener, R. E. Transliterated and Explained by E.H. Palmer. Committee of the Palestine Exploration Fund.
