= Israeli war crimes =

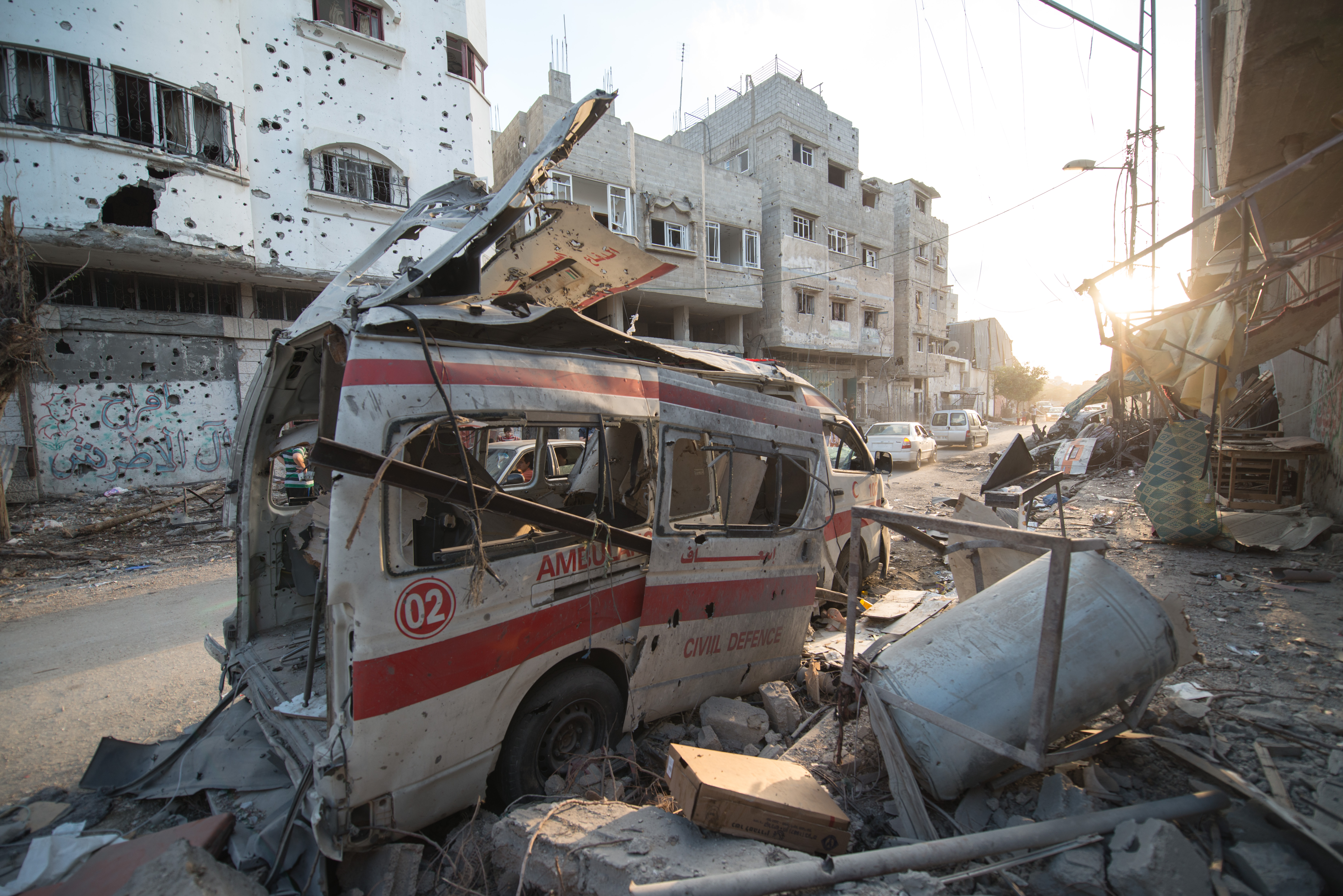
Ambulance destroyed in the neighborhood of Shuja'iyya in Gaza City during the 2014 Gaza War

Israeli war crimes are violations of international criminal law, including war crimes, crimes against humanity and the crime of genocide, which Israeli security forces have committed or been accused of committing since the founding of Israel in 1948. These have included murder, intentional targeting of civilians, killing prisoners of war and surrendered combatants, indiscriminate attacks, collective punishment, starvation, persecution, the use of human shields, sexual violence and rape, torture, pillage, forced transfer, breach of medical neutrality, enforced disappearance, targeting journalists, attacking civilian and protected objects, wanton destruction, incitement to genocide, and genocide.

Israel ratified the Geneva Conventions on 6 July 1951, and on 2 January 2015 the State of Palestine acceded to the Rome Statute, granting the International Criminal Court (ICC) jurisdiction over war crimes committed in the occupied Palestinian territories. Human rights experts argue that actions taken by the Israel Defense Forces during armed conflicts in the occupied Palestinian territories fall under the rubric of war crimes. Special rapporteurs from the United Nations, organizations including Human Rights Watch, Médecins Sans Frontières, Amnesty International, and human rights experts have accused Israel of war crimes.

Since 2006, the United Nations Human Rights Council has mandated several fact finding missions into violations of international law, including war crimes, in the occupied Palestinian territories, and in May 2021 established a permanent, ongoing inquiry. Since 2021, the ICC has had an active investigation into Israeli war crimes committed in the occupied Palestinian territories. Israel has refused to cooperate with the investigations. In December 2023, South Africa invoked the 1948 Genocide Convention and charged Israel with war crimes and acts of genocide committed in the occupied Palestinian territories and Gaza Strip. The case, South Africa v. Israel, was set to be heard at the International Court of Justice (ICJ), and South Africa presented its case to the court on 10 January. In March 2024, the UN special rapporteur on the situation of human rights in the occupied Palestinian territories found there were "reasonable grounds to believe that the threshold indicating the commission" of acts of genocide had been met. In November 2024, the ICC issued arrest warrants for Benjamin Netanyahu and Yoav Gallant for war crimes and crimes against humanity. In December 2024, Amnesty International and Human Rights Watch accused Israel of genocide. In October 2026, a further UN Commission of Inquiry report reaffirmed that Israel has committed war crimes and crimes against humanity in the Occupied Palestinian Territory amid the continuing genocide in Gaza, specifically those of extermination, persecution, torture, rape and other forms of sexual violence.

== 1948 – 1956 ==
=== 1948 Palestine War ===
During the 1948 Palestine war in which the State of Israel was established, around 700,000 (Note: The exact number of refugees is disputed. See List of estimates of the 1948 Palestinian expulsion and flight for details.) Palestinian Arabs, or 85% of the total population of the territory Israel captured, were expelled or fled from their homes. Most scholars consider that the majority of Palestinians were directly expelled or else fled due to fear. Causes of the exodus include direct expulsions by Israeli forces, destruction of Arab villages, psychological warfare including terrorism, dozens of massacres, crop burning, water deprivation, and typhoid epidemics in some areas caused by Israeli well-poisoning. Many historians consider the events of 1948 to fit the definition of ethnic cleansing. (Note: Laila Parsons, McGill University, 2009, Review of Ilan Pappé's 'The Ethnic Cleansing of Palestine', "Ilan Pappe has added another work to the many that have already been written in English on the 1948 Arab-Israeli War and the expulsion of more than 750,000 Palestinians from their homes. These include works by Walid Khalidi, Simha Flapan, Nafez Nazzal, Benny Morris, Nur Masalha, and Norman Finkelstein, among others. All but one of these authors (Morris) would probably agree with Pappe's position that what happened to the Palestinians in 1948 fits the definition of ethnic cleansing, and it certainly is not news to Palestinians themselves, who have always known what happened to them.")

Between 10 and 70 massacres occurred during the 1948 war. According to Benny Morris the Yishuv (or later Israeli) soldiers killed roughly 800 Arab civilians and prisoners of war in 24 massacres. Aryeh Yizthaki lists 10 major massacres with more than 50 victims each. Palestinian researcher Salman Abu-Sitta lists 33 massacres, half of them occurring during the civil war period. Saleh Abdel Jawad lists 68 villages in which the indiscriminate killing of prisoners and civilians took place while no threat was posed to Yishuv or Israeli soldiers.

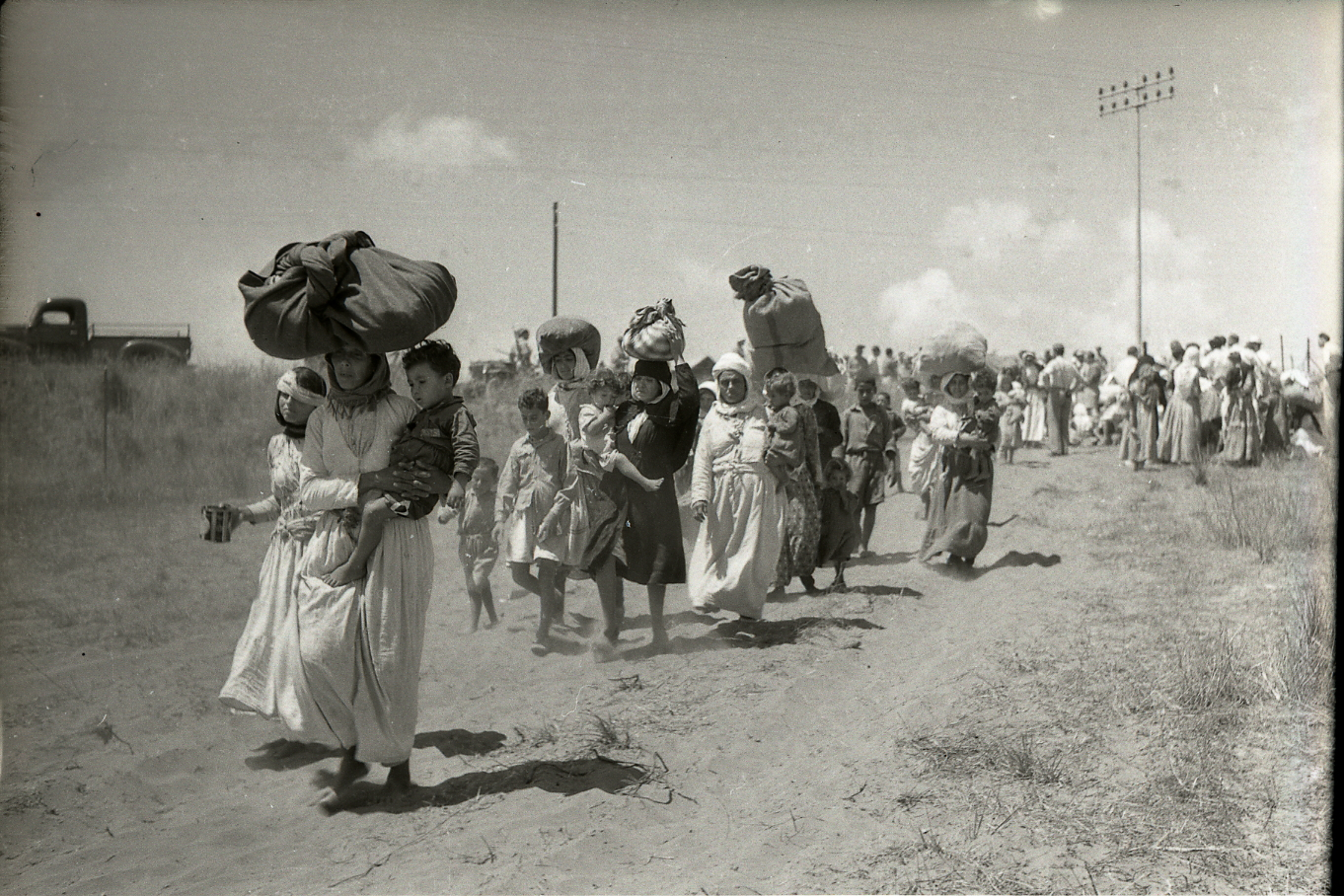
June 1948 expulsion of Palestinian villagers from Tantura, following the Tantura massacre

According to Rosemarie Esber, both Israeli archives and Palestinian testimonies confirm mass-killings occurred in numerous Arab villages. Israeli soldiers raped Palestinian women in at least a dozen incidents, often murdering their victims afterwards. Most of these occurred as villages were overrun and captured during the Second phase of the Civil War, Operation Dani, Operation Hiram and Operation Yoav. Morris said that the "worst cases" were the Lydda massacre with around 250 killed, the Deir Yassin massacre with around 112, the Saliha massacre with 60 to 70, and the Abu Shusha massacre with 60–70. In Al-Dawayima, accounts of the death toll vary. Saleh Abd al-Jawad reports 100–200 casualties, Morris has estimated "hundreds" and also reports the IDF investigation which concluded 100 villagers had been killed. David Ben-Gurion gave the figure of 70–80. Saleh Abd al-Jawad reports on the village's mukhtar account that 455 people were missing following the al-Dawayima massacre, including 170 women and children.

=== 1949–1955 Interwar period ===
On 6 January 1952, Israeli forces conducted a raid at the West Bank town of Beit Jala, then under Jordanian control, and demolished three homes using explosives. This operation resulted in the deaths of seven Palestinian civilians, including a 23-year-old man and his wife, as well as a mother and her four children aged between 6 and 14. Leaflets left at the scene, written in Arabic, claimed the attack was a "penalty" for the rape and murder of an Israeli Jewish girl, Leah Feistinger, in Jerusalem a month prior, attributing responsibility to residents of Beit Jala. The United Nations Truce Supervision Organization (UNTSO) condemned the raid as a serious breach of the 1949 Armistice Agreements, highlighting the indiscriminate nature of the attack and the targeting of civilians.

On the night of 28 August 1953, Ariel Sharon and his military Unit 101 carried out a massacre on the Bureij refugee camp, killing at least 20 civilians. According to UN officials, the Israelis threw bombs through the windows of huts while Palestinian refugees were sleeping and shot at those who tried to flee. The incident was described as an "appalling case of deliberate mass murder" by the UN Mixed Armistice Commission, which was set up to monitor the 1948 truce.

On 14 October 1953, Sharon and his forces carried out a massacre in the village of Qibya, in the then Jordanian-controlled West Bank, killing 69 villagers, two thirds of them women and children. In addition to that, they destroyed forty-five houses, a school, and a mosque. Ariel Sharon wrote in his diary that "Qibya was to be an example for everyone," and that he ordered "maximal killing and damage to property". Post-operational reports speak of breaking into houses and clearing them with grenades and shooting. The attack was condemned internationally, with the Mixed Armistice Commission calling it "coldblooded murder." Britain and the United States also denounced the attack, with the US State Department saying that "those responsible should be brought to account."

On 28 March 1954, around midnight, Israeli forces attacked the Jordanian village of Nahalin with mortars, machine guns, grenades and incendiary bombs. Between one and 14 civilians were killed, including at least one woman, and 10 to 18 civilians were injured, including women and children. Explosives were placed and detonated, destroying houses and the village mosque. The Jordanian National Guard and Arab Legion intercepted and engaged the IDF, resulting in the deaths of five national guards and three legionnaires.

=== Suez Crisis ===
During the Suez Crisis in 1956, Israel invaded the Sinai Peninsula and the Gaza Strip. Historian Benny Morris estimates Israeli forces killed around 500 Palestinian civilians in massacres and summary executions during and immediately following the conquest of Gaza, primarily in Khan Yunis and Rafah. According to the head of the United Nations observer mission, these actions were intended to expel the refugee population from the Gaza Strip.

==== Kafr Qasim massacre ====
On 29 October 1956, the Israeli army ordered that all Arab villages near the Jordanian border be placed under a wartime curfew from 5 p.m. to 6 a.m. on the following day. Any Arab on the streets was to be shot. The order was given to Israel Border Police units before most of the Arabs from the villages could be notified. The new curfew regulations were imposed in the absence of laborers who were at work and unaware of the new rules, and did not reach the mukhtar of Kafr Qasim until 4:30 p.m.. Between 5 p.m. and 6:30 p.m., in nine separate shooting incidents, the platoon stationed in Kafr Qasim killed 49 Palestinian civilians, including 19 men, 6 women and 23 children, who did not make it home before curfew. One survivor, Jamal Farij, recalled arriving at the entrance to the village in a truck with 28 passengers, stating, "We talked to them. We asked if they wanted our identity cards. They didn't. Suddenly one of them said, 'Cut them down' – and they opened fire on us like a flood." According to accounts from survivors collected by Samia Halaby, the many injured were left unattended and could not be succored by their families because of the curfew. When the curfew ended, the wounded were picked up from the streets and trucked to hospitals. Israeli soldiers gathered volunteers under duress from the nearby village of Jaljuliya to dig graves, and buried the dead at night, while the curfew was underway, without the permission of their confined families.

==== Khan Yunis massacre ====
On 3 November, after capturing Khan Yunis, the IDF searched the town and its refugee camp for fedayeen. During the search, the IDF troops shot and killed 275 Palestinian local residents and refugees, including dozens of summary executions. Israeli authorities later stated that there was resistance to their occupation, while the refugees stated that all resistance had ceased at the time of the incident. According to Jean-Pierre Filiu, the process of identifying 'fedayin' was inexact, it sufficing to have a picture of Nasser on one's wall to become suspect, or be arrested because one had a similar name to someone on Shin Bet's suspect list. Local children were reported to have been used by the IDF as human shields in areas where snipers were suspected of lying in wait, or where sites might have been booby-trapped. Homes and shops were often willfully damaged and looted. According to one account from a fleeing fedayeen, Saleh Shiblaq, Israeli forces walked through the town on the morning of 3 November, forcing men out of their homes or shooting them where they were found. In 2003, Shiblaq told Joe Sacco in an interview that all the old men, women, and children were removed from his household. Upon their departure, the remaining young men were sprayed with bursts of gunfire by Israeli soldiers. Adult male residents of Jalal Street were allegedly lined up and fired upon with Bren light machine guns, firing extraneously to the point that a stench of cordite filled the air. Israeli soldier Marek Gefen, in his account of post-occupation Khan Yunis, said, "In a few alleyways we found bodies strewn on the ground, covered in blood, their heads shattered. No one had taken care of moving them. It was dreadful. I stopped at a corner and threw up. I couldn't get used to the sight of a human slaughterhouse."

==== Rafah massacre ====
Israel's invasion of Rafah began on 1 November, and on 7 November fighting between Israeli forces and Egyptians and local militants had ceased. On 12 November, the IDF killed 111 in Rafah and the nearby refugee camp. As with the earlier Khan Yunis massacre, Israeli forces claimed that refugees continued to resist the occupying army, while Palestinian accounts maintain that all resistance had ceased when the killings took place. On the morning on 12 November, Israeli troops in Rafah summoned all men aged 15 to 60 to gather at a school, using loudspeakers and firing rifles into the air to enforce compliance. According to an UNRWA official, the Israeli loudspeaker summons was not heard throughout all of Rafah, and insufficient time was given for those summoned to reach the screening points, so that many refugees ran in order not to show up late. It appears soldiers panicked on observing the rush and opened fire on the crowd. Soldiers searched homes for those who failed to appear, killing any they found. As the men were herded toward the school, they were taunted and subjected to sporadic gunfire, leading to additional deaths. Survivors were lined up against a wall and forced to walk while being shot at, with many wounded or killed. Upon reaching the schoolyard, the men faced further humiliation, including beatings, intimidation, and being forced to relieve themselves publicly, as soldiers continued firing over their heads. The bodies of those killed were dumped in the Tell Zurub neighborhood on the western side of Rafah, where their families in defiance of the curfew, went to pick up the bodies of their kin and bury them. These burials took place without identification, making subsequent attempts to arrive at a precise figure for those killed difficult.

== 1967 – 2005 ==
=== Six-Day War ===
During the Six-Day War in 1967, the IDF killed surrendering Egyptian soldiers, Egyptian POWs, and civilians. Gabby Bron, a journalist for Yedioth Ahronoth, said he witnessed ten executions of Egyptian prisoners that were first forced to dig their own graves. Michael Bar-Zohar said that he had witnessed the murder of three Egyptian POWs by a cook, and Meir Pa'il said that he knew of many instances in which soldiers had killed POWs or Arab civilians. Israeli historian Uri Milstein stated there were many incidents in the 1967 war in which Egyptian soldiers were killed by Israeli troops after they had raised their hands in surrender. "It was not an official policy, but there was an atmosphere that it was okay to do it," Milstein said. "Some commanders decided to do it; others refused. But everyone knew about it." Israeli historian and journalist Tom Segev, in his book "1967", quotes one soldier who wrote, "Our soldiers were sent to scout out groups of men fleeing and shoot them. That was the order, and it was done while they were really trying to escape. If they were armed, they got shot. There was no other option. You couldn't even really take prisoners. And sometimes you had to finish people off when they were lying on the ground with their heads on their hands. Simply shoot them."

In addition, the war also caused displacement of civilian populations, as around 280,000 to 325,000 Palestinians and 100,000 Syrians fled or were expelled, known as the Naksa, from the West Bank and the Golan Heights, respectively. A number of Palestinian villages were also destroyed by the Israeli military, such as Imwas, Yalo, Bayt Nuba, Beit Awwa, and Al-Jiftlik, among others.

In September 1995, The New York Times reported that the Egyptian government had discovered two shallow mass graves in the Sinai at El Arish containing the remains of 30 to 60 Egyptian civilian and military prisoners allegedly shot by Israeli soldiers during the 1967 war. Israel declined to pursue charges, owing to its 20-year statute of limitations. The Israeli Ambassador to Cairo, David Sultan, asked to be relieved of his post after the Egyptian daily Al Shaab said he was personally responsible for the killing of 100 Egyptian prisoners, although both the Israeli Embassy and Foreign Ministry denied the charge. After his retirement, Brigadier-General in reserve, Arieh Biroh admitted in interviews to killing 49 Egyptian prisoners of war in the Sinai. In June 2000, Egypt's Al-Wafd newspaper reported that a mass grave was discovered in Ras Sedr, containing remains of 52 prisoners killed by Israeli paratroopers during the war. The report said that some skulls had bullet holes in them, indicating execution. Initial reports in Israeli newspaper Haaretz were censored. The New York Times reported that as many as 300 unarmed Egyptians were killed in the 1967 and 1956 wars. Israeli military historian Aryeh Yitzhaki estimated from army documents that, in the 1967 war, Israeli soldiers killed about 1,000 Egyptians after they surrendered.

=== War of Attrition ===
On 12 February 1970, Israeli Air Force aircraft launched an airstrike on the Abu Zaabal metal factory in Qalyubia Governorate, near Cairo. The factory, owned by the Private Company for Metal Industries, employed approximately 1,300 workers at the time. The attack involved the use of rockets, delayed-action bombs, and napalm, resulting in the deaths between 70 and 80 workers and injuring 69 others. Israel claimed that the factory was being used for military purposes, while Egypt maintained that it was a civilian industrial site. The bombing was widely condemned internationally, with many viewing it as a deliberate attack on a civilian target.

On 8 April 1970, four F-4 Phantoms of the Israeli Air Force bombed a primary school in the village of Bahr El-Baqar, located in the Province of Sharqia. The attack killed 46 children and injured at least another 50, many of whom suffered permanent disabilities. The school was also completely destroyed. Israel claimed the bombing was an accident, alleging the school was mistaken for a military installation, while Egypt and international observers widely condemned the attack as a war crime, pointing to the deliberate targeting of a civilian school.

=== 1982 Lebanon War ===
In 1982, Israel invaded Lebanon to drive out the Palestine Liberation Organization (PLO), and the IDF occupied Southern Lebanon. Following the siege of Beirut, the PLO forces and their allies negotiated passage from Lebanon with the aid of United States Special Envoy Philip Habib and the protection of international peacekeepers. By expelling the PLO, removing Syrian influence over Lebanon, and installing a pro-Israeli Christian government led by President Bachir Gemayel, Israel sought to sign a treaty which Israeli Prime Minister Menachem Begin promised would give Israel "forty years of peace". However, after the assassination of Gemayel in September, Israel's position in Beirut became untenable and the signing of a peace treaty became increasingly unlikely. Outraged by the assassination, Phalangists called for a revenge attack.

On 16 September the IDF allowed Lebanese militias to enter Beirut's Sabra neighbourhood and the adjacent Shatila refugee camp. From approximately 18:00 on 16 September to 08:00 on 18 September, the militias carried out a massacre while the IDF had the Palestinian camp surrounded. The IDF had ordered the militias to clear out the fighters of the PLO from Sabra and Shatila as part of a larger Israeli maneuver into western Beirut. As the massacre unfolded, the IDF received reports of atrocities being committed, but did not take any action to stop it. Israeli troops were stationed at the exits of the area to prevent the camp's residents from leaving and, at the request of the militias, fired flares to illuminate Sabra and Shatila through the night. Between 460 and 3,500 (Note: The number of victims is disputed.) civilians—mostly Palestinians and Lebanese Shias—were killed in the massacre. Many of the victims were tortured before they were killed; women and girls were repeatedly raped; some victims were skinned alive, some had limbs chopped off with axes, while others were tied to cars and dragged through the streets. Afterward, bulldozers were brought in to bury bodies and demolish the camps.

On 16 December 1982 the United Nations General Assembly condemned the massacre and declared it to be an act of genocide. In February 1983, an independent commission chaired by Irish diplomat Seán MacBride (the then-assistant to the Secretary-General of the United Nations) launched an inquiry into the violence and concluded that the IDF, as the erstwhile occupying power over Sabra and Shatila, bore responsibility for the militia's massacre. The commission also stated that the massacre was a form of genocide. That same month, the Israeli government launched the Kahan Commission to investigate the cause and circumstances of the Sabra and Shatila massacre, and found that Israeli military personnel had failed to take serious steps to stop the killings despite being aware of the militia's actions. The Israeli commission deemed that the IDF was indirectly responsible for the events, and forced erstwhile Israeli defense minister Ariel Sharon to resign from his position "for ignoring the danger of bloodshed and revenge" during the massacre.

=== Israeli occupation of Southern Lebanon ===
Israeli forces withdrew from Beirut on 29 September 1982, but continued to occupy Lebanon's southern half. Amid rising casualties from guerrilla attacks, the IDF withdrew south to the Awali river on 3 September 1983. For nearly the next two decades, an armed conflict took place in which Hezbollah, along with Shia Muslim and left-wing guerrillas, fought against Israel and its ally, the Catholic Christian-dominated South Lebanon Army, until Israel's withdrawal in May 2000.

==== Sohmor massacre ====
On 20 September 1984, the South Lebanon Army, with the backing of the IDF, opened fire at a group of men, killing 13 civilians in the Lebanese village of Sohmor. Lebanese Information Minister Joseph Skaff called the attack part of a "series of massacres perpetrated by Israel or encouraged by it and carried out under its direct coverage and with its full support".

==== Operation Accountability ====
On 25 July 1993, Israeli forces launched a week-long attack against Lebanon known as Operation Accountability. Israel specified two purposes to the operation: to strike directly at Hezbollah, making it difficult for Hezbollah to use southern Lebanon as a base for striking Israel, and to displace Lebanese and Palestinian civilians in the hopes of pressuring the Lebanese government to intervene against Hezbollah. During the attack, around 120 Lebanese civilians were killed and close to 500 injured by Israeli assaults on population centers, which also displaced around 300,000 Lebanese villagers and Palestinian refugees. Israeli bombardment fully destroyed 1,000 homes, partially destroyed another 1,500, lightly damaged another 15,000, and damaged schools, mosques, churches, and cemeteries. Israeli forces also cut civilian water and electricity supplies, a war crime. Human Rights Watch stated, "To the extent that civilians were the immediate targets of this military assault-to sow terror and induce behavior that would serve Israel's political goals-Israel was in grave violation of international humanitarian law." They further stated that Israel gave inadequate or ineffective warnings to civilians before attacks, and said that the likely intent of some warnings was to sow terror among the population, inducing them to flee in service of pressuring the Lebanese government. International humanitarian law prohibits actions primarily aimed at terrorizing a population. Human Rights Watch also stated that Israeli forces directly attacked civilian targets with no military objective, including a market and refugee camp, hindered and attacked ambulances and vehicles of relief organizations, attacked civilians attempting to flee, and used flechettes and white phosphorus munitions in an antipersonnel capacity in populated areas.

==== Operation Grapes of Wrath ====
On 17 April 1996, Israel launched a seventeen-day campaign known as Operation Grapes of Wrath against Hezbollah which attempted to force the group north of the Litani River. In their attempt to degrade and destroy Hezbollah, the IDF conducted more than 600 air raids and fired approximately 25,000 shells, killing approximately 154 Lebanese civilians and wounding 351. During the operation, Hezbollah launched cross-border rocket attacks targeting northern Israel, and participated in numerous engagements with Israeli and South Lebanon Army forces. The conflict was de-escalated on 27 April by a ceasefire agreement banning attacks on civilians.

===== Mansouri attack =====
On 13 April 1996, an IDF helicopter rocketed an ambulance carrying 13 civilians in Mansouri, killing two women and four children. Reporters on the scene filmed the incident. The IDF claimed the ambulance was being used by Hezbollah fighters to flee, but UN soldiers who arrived immediately after found no weapons or military equipment in the car, and an investigation by Amnesty International found no connection between anyone in the vehicle to Hezbollah. Both Amnesty and B'Tselem called it a war crime.

===== Nabatieh Fawka attack =====
On 18 April 1996, when Israeli warplanes bombed an apartment in the village of Nabatiyya al-Faqwah, killing at least nine people, including a mother and seven of her children. The planes returned and hit a neighbouring house, causing no injuries, and, at about the same time, helicopters rocketed a third house with no injuries. Israeli Prime Minister Shimon Peres stated that Katyusha rockets had been fired from the houses–a claim the IDF did not itself make. The IDF said that Hezbollah fighters who had fired on them from a nearby position were sheltering in the houses. Human Rights Watch stated that the IDF provided no evidence to support either claim. Amnesty and B'Tselem also disputed the IDF claim, and said it wouldn't have justified the attack, with Amnesty stating it indicated a "blatant disregard for the need to maintain the principle of distinction at all times."

===== Qana massacre =====
On 18 April 1996, near Israeli-occupied Qana, a village Southern Lebanon, the Israeli military fired artillery shells at a UNIFIL compound, which was sheltering around 800 Lebanese civilians, killing 106 and injuring around 116. Four Fijian UNIFIL soldiers were also seriously injured. Israel said it had launched the artillery barrage to cover an Israeli special forces unit after it had come under mortar fire launched from the vicinity of the compound, but its claims were later refuted by a United Nations investigation which said that the Israeli shelling was deliberate, based on video evidence showing an Israeli reconnaissance drone over the compound before the shelling. The Israeli government at first denied the existence of the drone, but then said, after being told of the video evidence, that the drone was on a different mission. Amnesty International visited the compound and conducted an investigation which found the attack to have been deliberate. Human Rights Watch said it was both an indiscriminate and disproportionate attack, respective war crimes.

=== First Intifada ===
On 13 April 1989, a raid was conducted by Israeli Border Police during the First Intifada. The raid took place in the early morning hours in the West Bank village of Nahalin, near Bethlehem. It was aimed at arresting individuals suspected of stone-throwing, removing Palestinian flags, and erasing nationalist graffiti. Around 30 officers entered the village around 3:30 AM, during the Muslim holy month of Ramadan, when many residents were already awake for the suhoor. When local youths began throwing stones at the soldiers, Israeli forces responded by imposing a curfew and using live ammunition. The confrontation quickly escalated, resulting in the deaths of five Palestinian youths and injuries to at least 50 others. Human rights organizations and UN bodies later condemned the operation, citing it as an example of disproportionate use of force and indiscriminate targeting. The firing of live rounds against stone-throwers raised serious concerns about violations of the principle of proportionality, which requires military responses to be commensurate with the threat posed. Moreover, the imposition of a village-wide curfew and the punitive nature of the raid were seen as forms of collective punishment, explicitly prohibited under Article 33 of the Fourth Geneva Convention. An internal Israeli investigation concluded that the troops had "lost control and fired excessively," recommending disciplinary measures against some personnel.

On 10 October 1990, amid elevated tensions over the Sukkot march, a crowd of Palestinians began throwing rocks at Jewish worshippers at the Western Wall of the Temple Mount. In response, 40 Israeli Border Police opened fire with automatic weapons on the Palestinian crowd, killing at least 21 and injuring at least 150. There were no Israeli deaths. In a resolution on 12 October, the UN condemned the violence committed by the Israeli forces, and proposed an investigation. Israel rejected the resolution and refused to cooperate with an investigation. Failing to get agreement from Israel, the Secretary-General Javier Pérez de Cuéllar on 31 October published his report. In it, he said, "some 17 to 21 Palestinians were killed and more than 150 wounded by Israeli security forces, and more than 20 Israeli civilians and police were wounded by Palestinians. While there are conflicting opinions as to what provoked the clashes, observers on the spot, including personnel of the International Committee of the Red Cross (ICRC), stated that live ammunition was used against Palestinian civilians."

Subsequently, United Nations Security Council Resolution 681 on 20 December 1990, referring to Resolutions 672 and 673, called on Israel to apply the Fourth Geneva Convention to Palestinians in the occupied territories. In their Annual 1990 World Report Human Rights Watch condemned the Israeli report on the incident as "only mentioning in passing the 'uncontrolled use of live ammunition' by police, giving scant attention to what should have been a central issue: the use of excessive force, including shooting into a crowd with bursts of automatic-weapon fire." Palestinians stated they only threw rocks after being attacked with tear gas and live weapons, in an effort to defend themselves and stop the soldiers.

=== Second Intifada ===
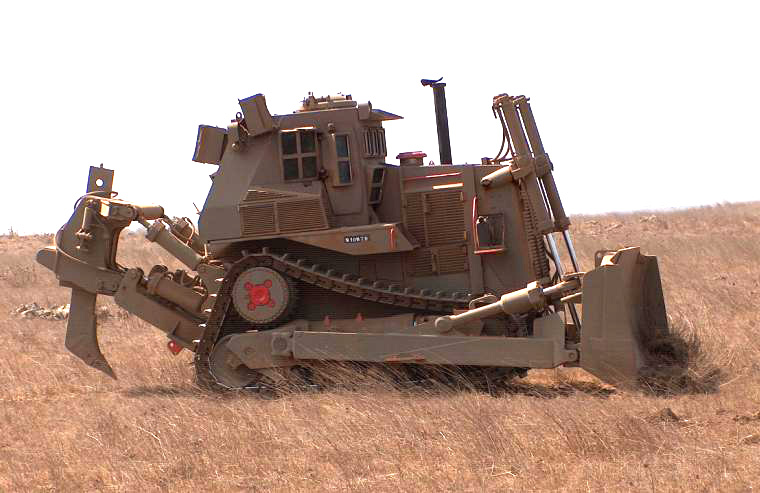
IDF Caterpillar D9

Between 2 and 11 April 2002 a siege and fierce fighting took place in the Palestinian refugee camp of the city of Jenin. The camp was targeted during Operation Defensive Shield after Israel determined that it had "served as a launch site for numerous terrorist attacks against both Israeli civilians and Israeli towns and villages in the area." The Jenin battle became a flashpoint for both sides, and saw fierce urban combat as Israeli infantry supported by armor and attack helicopters fought to clear the camp of Palestinian militants. The battle was eventually won by the IDF, after it employed a dozen Caterpillar D9 armored bulldozers to clear Palestinian booby traps, detonate explosive charges, and raze buildings and gun-posts; the bulldozers proved impervious to attacks by Palestinian militants.

During Israeli military operations in the camp, Palestinian sources alleged that a massacre of hundreds of people had taken place. A senior Palestinian Authority official alleged in mid-April that some 500 had been killed. During the fighting in Jenin, Israeli officials had also initially estimated hundreds of Palestinian deaths, but later said they expected the Palestinian toll to reach "45 to 55." In the ensuing controversy, Israel blocked the United Nations from conducting the first-hand inquiry unanimously sought by the Security Council, but the UN nonetheless felt able to dismiss claims of a massacre in its report, which said there had been approximately 52 deaths, criticising both sides for placing Palestinian civilians at risk.

At the same time human rights organizations charged Israel with war crimes and crimes against humanity. In November, Amnesty International reported that there was "clear evidence" that the IDF committed war crimes against Palestinian civilians in Jenin and Nablus. The report accused Israel of blocking medical care, using people as human shields, shooting and killing unarmed civilians, including one in custody, bulldozing houses with residents inside, in one case knowingly crushing a severely disabled man to death, in another case killing eight members of a family, the reckless killing of civilians with explosives charges on doors, mass arbitrary detentions and beatings of prisoners, which resulted in one death, and preventing ambulances and aid organizations from reaching the areas of combat even after the fighting had reportedly stopped. Amnesty criticized the UN report, noting that its officials did not actually visit Jenin.

The Observer reporter Peter Beaumont wrote that what happened in Jenin was not a massacre, but that the mass destruction of houses was a war crime, covered by Article 147 of the Fourth Geneva Convention in its prohibition on "the extensive destruction or unlawful appropriation of property, not justified by military necessity committed either unlawfully or wantonly." Some reports noted that Israel's restriction of access to Jenin and refusal to allow the UN investigation access to the area were evidence of a coverup, a charge echoed by Mouin Rabbani, Director of the Palestinian American Research Center in Ramallah.

== 2006 – 2013 ==
=== 2006 Gaza–Israel conflict ===
On 28 June 2006, Israel invaded Gaza in response to the capture of Israeli soldier Gilad Shalit by Palestinian militants on 25 June 2006. Hamas sought the release of a large number of Palestinian prisoners held by Israel in exchange for Shalit. Large-scale conventional warfare occurred in Gaza until 26 November, resulting in a ceasefire between Israel and Hamas and an Israeli withdrawal. No deal was reached for the release of Shalit or Palestinian prisoners.

==== Civilian deaths ====
On 12 July, nine members of the Abu Selmiyeh family were killed when the IDF landed a 550-pound bomb on a building in Gaza City. B'Tselem called for the attack to be investigated as a war crime, characterizing it as indiscriminate and disproportional.

==== Human shields ====
B'Tselem reported that the IDF used Palestinian civilians as human shields during a military operation in Beit Hanoun. According to the report, civilians were held on staircases near soldiers engaged in gunfire, forced to accompany soldiers during searches, walking ahead of them and opening doors the soldiers feared would be fired on when opened, and subjected to physical abuse, such as being tied, blindfolded, and beaten.

==== Attacks against civilian objects ====
On 28 June 2006, the Israeli Air Force bombed Gaza's only electrical power plant, leaving 1.4 million residents without reliable electricity and causing widespread disruptions to essential services, including healthcare, water, sewage, and refrigeration. Human Rights Watch and B'Tselem criticized the attack as a war crime, with the latter stating that the power plant was a civilian object and that less harmful alternatives were available. B'Tselem called on Israel to repair the damage, compensate affected residents, and investigate those responsible for the decision to target the plant, urging adherence to laws forbidding attacks on civilians and civilian infrastructure.

=== 2006 Lebanon War ===
In July 2006, a conflict erupted between Israel and Hezbollah in Lebanon, triggered by a cross-border raid by Hezbollah militants who captured two Israeli soldiers. The ensuing 34-day war involved extensive Israeli airstrikes and a ground invasion of southern Lebanon, resulting in at least 1,109 Lebanese deaths—of which at least 900 were civilians—4,399 injured, and an estimated 1 million displaced. In a 249-page report, Human Rights Watch found that "Israel conducted the war with reckless indifference to the fate of Lebanese civilians and violated the laws of war" and asked the secretary-general of the United Nations to establish an international commission of inquiry to investigate reports of war crimes. In a report, Amnesty International also said that during the month-long conflict in Lebanon, Israel committed war crimes, including indiscriminate attacks, if not direct attacks against civilians, disproportionate attacks, including the sustained artillery bombardment of south Lebanon and the widespread use of cluster bombs in civilian areas, attacks on civilian objects, and collective punishment.

=== 2008–2009 Gaza War ===
==== Collective punishment ====
The United Nations Fact Finding Mission on the Gaza Conflict found that Israel targeted the people of Gaza as a whole. The Mission gave its opinion that "the operations were in furtherance of an overall policy aimed at punishing the Gaza population for its resilience and for its apparent support for Hamas, and possibly with the intent of forcing a change in such support."

==== Disproportionate force ====
Israel was widely criticized by human rights groups for using heavy firepower and causing hundreds of civilian casualties. A group of soldiers who took part in the conflict echoed the criticism through both the Israeli NGO Breaking the Silence and a special report by Israeli filmmaker Nurit Kedar that was shown on Britain's Channel 4 in January 2011. Israel was accused of having a deliberate policy of disproportionate force aimed at the civilian population. Israel has said that operational orders emphasized proportionality and humanity while the importance of minimising harm to civilians was made clear to soldiers. Some IDF soldiers, however, reported that they had been encouraged to shoot indiscriminately and disproportionately, and were ordered to "cleanse the neighbourhoods, the buildings, the area."

==== Human shields ====
On 24 March 2009 a report from the UN team responsible for the protection of children in war zones was released: it found "hundreds" of violations of the rights of children and accused Israeli soldiers of using children as human shields, bulldozing a home with a woman and child still inside, and shelling a building they had ordered civilians into a day earlier. One case involved using an 11-year-old boy as a human shield, by forcing him to enter suspected buildings first and also inspect bags. The report also mentioned the boy was used as a shield when Israeli soldiers came under fire. The UK newspaper The Guardian has also received testimony from three Palestinian brothers aged 14, 15, and 16, who all claimed to have been used as human shields.

The Guardian conducted an investigation of its own, which, according to the paper, uncovered evidence of war crimes including the use of Palestinian children as human shields. An Israeli military court later convicted two Israeli soldiers of using human shields, which was outlawed by the Israeli Supreme court in 2005.

The UN fact-finding mission investigated four incidents in which Palestinian civilians were coerced, blindfolded, handcuffed and at gunpoint to enter houses ahead of Israeli soldiers during military operations. The mission confirmed the continued use of this practice with published testimonies of Israeli soldiers who had taken part in the military operations. The mission concluded that these practices amounted to using civilians as human shields in breach of international law. Some civilians were also questioned under threat of death or injury to extract information about Palestinian combatants and tunnels, constituting a further violation of international humanitarian law.

==== White phosphorus ====
Israeli forces made extensive use of white phosphorus during Operation Cast Lead. Reports of its use emerged in January, which Israel initially and repeatedly denied, then later admitted when faced with mounting evidence and international criticism. Civilian objects including homes, schools, hospitals, and UN buildings all took direct hits.

On 4 January, the IDF fired a white phosphorus shell into a house sheltering the Abu Halima family, killing one man and four of his children and igniting an intense fire; five more members of the family suffered burns, with one later dying from her injuries. Amnesty International and Human Rights Watch said the incident constituted the war crime of an indiscriminate attack. On 12 January, The Times reported that over 50 phosphorus burn victims were taken to Nasser Hospital. On 15 January, the IDF fired air-burst white phosphorus directly over homes and apartment buildings in the crowded neighborhood of Tel al-Hawa, killing at least four civilians from a single family.

On 15 January, the field office compound of the United Nations Relief and Works Agency for Palestine Refugees in the Near East (UNRWA), at the time sheltering 600 to 700 civilians and containing a large fuel depot, was shelled with high explosives and white phosphorus munitions. Despite being alerted to the risks, the IDF continued attacking for several hours. On the same day, according to the report, the IDF "directly and intentionally" attacked Al-Quds Hospital with white phosphorus, starting fires and causing evacuations. On 5, 6 and 16 January, the IDF hit Al-Wafa Hospital in eastern Gaza City with missiles and white phosphorus shells. The UN report said the IDF violated international law in both cases. An Israeli response to the report later admitted that "shells were fired in violation of the rules of engagement prohibiting use of such artillery near populated areas."

Al Jazeera video. Burning Israeli white phosphorus clusters in the streets of Gaza on 11 January 2009. Videos by Al Jazeera of the 2008–2009 Gaza War.

On 17 January, Israeli forces air-burst at least three white phosphorus shells over another UN facility, a school in Beit Lahiya sheltering around 1,600 displaced persons. One shell hit a classroom, killing two brothers, aged 4 and 5, and injuring their mother and cousin, resulting in amputations for both. Others were injured, and the classroom and parts of the school burned.

On 25 March 2009, Human Rights Watch published a 71-page report titled "Rain of Fire, Israel's Unlawful Use of White Phosphorus in Gaza" and said that Israel's usage of the weapon was illegal. Donatella Rovera, Amnesty's researcher on Israel and the Occupied Palestinian Territories said that such extensive use of this weapon in Gaza's densely populated residential neighborhoods is inherently indiscriminate. "Its repeated use in this manner, despite evidence of its indiscriminate effects and its toll on civilians, is a war crime," she said. The Goldstone Report said that the Israelis were "systematically reckless" in using white phosphorus in built up areas and called for serious consideration to be given to the banning of its use as an obscurant.

==== Accusations of misconduct by IDF soldiers ====
Testimonies from Israeli soldiers allegedly admitting indiscriminate killings of civilians, as well as vandalizing homes, were reported in March 2009. Israel military officials challenged notions of systematic violations, though with admissions of some wrongdoing. Following investigations, the IDF issued a report concluding that no war crimes were committed. Human rights groups criticized the Israeli investigation as hasty, biased, and ignoring key evidence. Nine Israeli rights groups issued a joint statement calling for an "independent nonpartisan investigative body to be established to look into all Israeli army activity" in Gaza.

In July 2009, the Israeli human rights organization Breaking the Silence published a 110-page report, including video interviews in which faces were blurred out, of testimonies from 26 soldiers who took part in the Gaza assault and said that the IDF used Gazans as human shields, improperly fired incendiary white phosphorus shells over civilian areas, in at least one case to incinerate a house, and used overwhelming firepower that caused needless deaths and destruction. Israeli military officials criticized Breaking The Silence, initially saying they had not submitted the report for the IDF to investigate. Yehuda Shaul, one of the heads of Breaking the Silence, countered that the report had been submitted 24 hours before its publication. Subsequently, Israeli officials accused Breaking The Silence of having a motive to slander the IDF, saying that if they wanted an investigation they would have turned over the identities of the soldiers and locations where the incidents took place. Shaul rejected the accusation, pointing out that the report included unit names along with most of the locations in the testimonies. Breaking the Silence said that their methodology includes the verification of all information by cross-referencing the testimonies it collects and that published material has been confirmed by a number of testimonies, from several different points of view. A representative stated "the personal details of the soldiers quoted in the collection, and the exact location of the incidents described in the testimonies, would readily be made available to any official and independent investigation of the events, as long as the identity of the testifiers did not become public."

In response to the report, a dozen English-speaking reservists who served in Gaza delivered signed, on-camera counter-testimonies via the SoldiersSpeakOut group, about Hamas' "use of Gazans as human shields and the measures the IDF took to protect Arab civilians". The special report by Israeli filmmaker Nurit Kedar shown on Channel 4 detailed similar allegations by former IDF soldiers that included vandalism and misconduct by Israeli troops.

==== Prosecutions ====
The first Israeli soldier to be prosecuted for actions committed during the war was a Givati Brigade soldier who stole a Visa credit card from a Palestinian home and used it to withdraw NIS 1,600 ($405). He was arrested and tried before the Southern Command Military Court on charges of looting, credit card fraud, and indecent conduct. He was found guilty and sentenced to seven and a half months in military prison.

In a report submitted to the UN in January 2010, the IDF stated that two senior officers were disciplined for authorizing an artillery attack in violation of rules against their near populated areas. Several artillery shells hit the UNRWA compound in Tel al-Hawa. During the attack on 15 January 2009, the compound was set ablaze by white phosphorus shells. The officers involved were identified as Gaza Division Commander Brigadier-General Eyal Eisenberg and Givati Brigade Commander Colonel Ilan Malka. An IDF internal investigation concluded that the firing of the shells violated the IDF orders limiting the use of artillery fire near populated areas and endangered human life. IDF sources added later that the shells had been fired to create cover to assist in the extrication of IDF troops, some of whom were wounded, from an area where Hamas held a superior position. An Israeli Government spokesman stated that in this particular case they had found no evidence of criminal wrongdoing and so had not referred the case to criminal investigation.

In October 2010 Colonel Ilan Malka was interrogated by Israeli military police over the Zeitoun killings, and a criminal investigation was opened. Malka was suspected of authorizing an airstrike on a building that left numerous members of the Samouni family dead. His promotion to the rank of Brigadier-General was suspended due to the investigation. Malka told investigators that he was unaware of the presence of civilians. He was eventually reprimanded over the incident, but it was decided not to indict him. No other charges were brought over this incident. The IDF denied that they were targeting civilians and The New York Times reported that Hamas members had launched rockets at Israel about a mile away from the residents, an area "known to have many supporters of Hamas". The Palestinian Center for Human Rights called the result "disgraceful" and Btselem stated the need for an external investigator to look into IDF actions during Cast Lead.

In July 2010, Chief Advocate General Avichai Mandelblit announced manslaughter charges against an unnamed IDF sniper for firing on a group of civilians waving white flags, killing the 35 year old Majda Abu Hajaj and her 64-year-old mother, Rayah. In 2012, the soldier agreed to a plea bargain, the manslaughter charges were dropped, and the soldier was sentenced to 45 days in prison.

In July 2010, the officer who authorized the airstrike on the Ibrahim al-Maqadna Mosque was subjected to disciplinary action, as shrapnel caused "unintentional injuries" to civilians inside. The IDF said that the officer "failed to exercise appropriate judgement", and that he would not be allowed to serve in similar positions of command in the future. Another Israeli officer was also reprimanded for allowing a Palestinian man to enter a building to persuade Hamas militants sheltering inside to leave.

In November 2010 two Givati Brigade Staff Sergeants were convicted by the Southern Command Military Court of using a Palestinian boy as a human shield. The soldiers had been accused of forcing nine-year-old Majed R. at gunpoint to open bags suspected of containing bombs in the Tel al-Hawa neighborhood. Both soldiers were demoted one rank and given three-month suspended sentences.

According to the U.S. State Department's 2010 Human Rights Report, the Military Advocate General investigated over 150 wartime incidents, including those mentioned in the Goldstone Report. As of July, the Military Advocate General launched 47 criminal investigations into the conduct of IDF personnel, and completed a significant number of those.

==== Goldstone controversy ====
The UN report on the conflict was denounced by the United States Congress and Israeli leadership, with Benjamin Netanyahu stating that the report, along with Hamas rockets and a nuclear-armed Iran, was one of the three main threats to Israel. Judge Richard Goldstone, the report's lead author, was subjected to personal attacks. Robert Fisk reported that Goldstone was pressured by Israel and members of his family to recant his report, was harassed by the Jewish community of South Africa, and was "in a state of great personal distress." On 1 April 2011 Goldstone published an op-ed piece in The Washington Post titled "Reconsidering the Goldstone Report on Israel and war crimes". In the piece, though he maintained the validity of incidents involving individual soldiers, Goldstone said that subsequent investigations conducted by Israel indicated that civilians were not intentionally targeted as a matter of policy, and that such evidence "probably would have influenced our findings about intentionality and war crimes." The other principal authors of the UN report, Hina Jilani, Christine Chinkin and Desmond Travers, rejected Goldstone's reassessment, arguing that there was "no justification for any demand or expectation for reconsideration of the report as nothing of substance has appeared that would in any way change the context, findings or conclusions of that report with respect to any of the parties to the Gaza conflict". After publication his op-ed, and pressure from the United States and Israel to nullify the report, Goldstone refused to recant it, stating, "As presently advised I have no reason to believe any part of the report needs to be reconsidered at this time."

=== 2012 Gaza War ===
On 18 November 2012, the IDF conducted an airstrike that killed ten members of the al-Dalu family, including five children and an elderly woman, and two of the family's neighbors. At least nine other civilians were injured, and several nearby houses were destroyed. Human Rights Watch called the strike disproportionate and a war crime, and called for the perpetrators of the strike to be punished and the surviving family members of the victims to be compensated.

== 2014 – 2022 ==
=== 2014 Gaza War ===
Israel received some 500 complaints concerning 360 alleged violations. 80 were closed without criminal charges, 6 cases were opened on incidents allegedly involving criminal conduct, and in one case regarding 3 IDF soldiers in the aftermath of the Battle of Shuja'iyya, a charge of looting was laid. Most cases were closed for what the military magistrates considered to be lack of evidence to sustain a charge of misconduct. No mention was made of incidents during the "Black Friday" events at Rafah.

According to Assaf Sharon of Tel Aviv University, the IDF was pressured by politicians to unleash unnecessary violence whose basic purpose was 'to satisfy a need for vengeance', which the politicians themselves tried to whip up in Israel's population. Asa Kasher wrote that the IDF was pulled into fighting "that is both strategically and morally asymmetric" and that, like any other army, it made mistakes, but the charges it faces are "grossly unfair". The Israeli NGO Breaking the Silence, reporting on its analysis of 111 testimonies concerning the war by some 70 IDF soldiers and officers, cited one veteran's remark that "Anyone found in an IDF area, which the IDF had occupied, was not a civilian," to argue that this was the basic rule of engagement. Soldiers were briefed to regard everything inside the Strip as a threat. The report cites several examples of civilians, including women, being shot dead and defined as "terrorists" in later reports. Since leaflets were dropped telling civilians to leave areas to be bombed, soldiers could assume any movement in a bombed area entitled them to shoot. In one case that came under investigation, Lt Col Neria Yeshurun ordered a Palestinian medical centre to be shelled to avenge the killing of one of his officers by a sniper.

==== Civilian deaths ====
Many of those killed were civilians, prompting concern from many humanitarian organisations. An investigation by Human Rights Watch concluded that Israel had probably committed war crimes on three specific incidents involving strikes on UNWRA schools. Amnesty International stated that: "Israeli forces have carried out attacks that have killed hundreds of civilians, including through the use of precision weaponry such as drone-fired missiles, and attacks using munitions such as artillery, which cannot be precisely targeted, on very densely populated residential areas, such as Shuja'iyya. They have also directly attacked civilian objects." B'Tselem has compiled an infogram listing families killed at home in 72 incidents of bombing or shelling, comprising 547 people killed, of whom 125 were women under 60, 250 were minors, and 29 were over 60. On 24 August, Palestinian health officials said that 89 families had been killed.

Nine people were killed while watching the World Cup in a café, and 8 members of a family died that Israel has said were inadvertently killed. A Golani soldier interviewed about his operations inside Gaza said that the IDF often could not distinguish between civilians and Hamas fighters. U.S. military officials said that Israel took measures to limit civilian casualties.

===== Warnings prior to attacks =====
International humanitarian law requires giving effective advance warning of attacks that affect civilians. Prior to attacks, the IDF issued evacuation warnings to civilians with phone calls, leaflets, and roof knocks with light or inert missiles, but was criticized for giving ineffective warnings in many cases. Amnesty International stated, "When Israeli forces have given warning in many cases key elements of effective warning have been missing, including timeliness, informing civilians where it is safe to flee, and providing safe passage and sufficient time to flee before an attack. There also have been reports of lethal strikes launched too soon after a warning to spare civilians." A report by Jaffa based NGO Physicians for Human Rights, released in January 2015, said that Israel's alert system had failed, and that the roof-knock system was ineffective. The Geneva-based Euro-Mid Observer for Human Rights stated that roof knock warnings were lethal and had resulted in civilian casualties, and that insufficient time was provided for civilians to evacuate, with attacks following only a minute after the warning shot. Amnesty International said that "although the Israeli authorities claim to be warning civilians in Gaza, a consistent pattern has emerged that their actions do not constitute an "effective warning" under international humanitarian law." Human Rights Watch concurred, finding several cases where an attack was carried out within five minutes the warning, and noted that Gaza has no bomb shelters or places for civilians to realistically flee. While condemning Israeli air attacks against civilian objects as war crimes, Sarah Leah Whitson, the Middle East director at Human Rights Watch, said, "Warning families to flee might reduce civilian casualties but they don't make illegal attacks any less illegal." Many Gazans, when asked, told journalists that they remained in their houses simply because they had nowhere else to go. OCHA's spokesman said civilians had no safe place to evacuate to in Gaza. The UN Fact Finding Mission of the 2008 war had previously condemned roof knocking as unlawful.

==== Destruction of homes ====
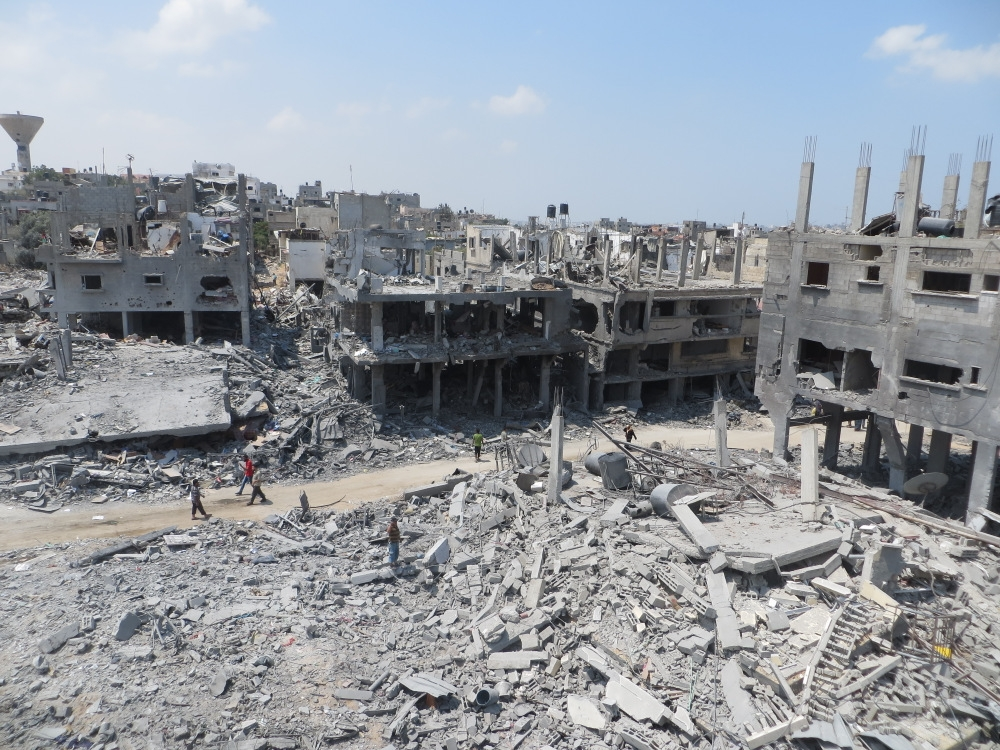
Ruins of a residential area in Beit Hanoun in 2014

Israel targeted many homes in this conflict. UNWRA official Robert Turner estimated that 7,000 homes were demolished and 89,000 were damaged, some 10,000 of them severely. This has led to many members of the same family being killed. B'Tselem documented 59 incidents of bombing and shelling, in which 458 people were killed. In some cases, Israel has stated that these homes were of suspected militants and were used for military purposes. The New York Times noted that the damage in this operation was higher than in the previous two wars and stated that 60,000 people had been left homeless as a result. The destruction of homes has been condemned by B'Tselem, Human Rights Watch, and Amnesty International as unlawful, amounting to collective punishment and war crimes.

Israel destroyed the homes of two suspects in the case of the abduction and killing of the three teenagers. B'Tselem condemned the house demolitions as unlawful. Palestinians returning to their homes during the ceasefire reported that IDF soldiers had trashed their homes, destroyed home electronics such as TV sets, spread feces in their homes, and carved slogans such as "Burn Gaza down" and "Good Arab = dead Arab" in walls and furniture. The IDF did not respond to a request by The Guardian for comment.

On 5 November 2014, Amnesty International published a report examining eight cases where the IDF targeted homes, resulting in the deaths of 111 people, of whom 104 were civilians. Barred from access to Gaza by Israel since 2012, it conducted its research remotely, supported by two contracted Gaza-based fieldworkers who conducted multiple visits of each site to interview survivors, and consulted with military experts to evaluate photographic and video material. It concludes, in every case, that "there was a failure to take necessary precautions to avoid excessive harm to civilians and civilian property, as required by international humanitarian law" and "no prior warning was given to the civilian residents to allow them to escape." As Israel did not disclose any information regarding the incidents, the report said it was not possible for Amnesty International to be certain of what Israel was targeting; it also said that if there were no valid military objectives, international humanitarian law may have been violated, as attacks directed at civilians and civilian objects, or attacks which are otherwise disproportionate relative to the anticipated military advantage of carrying them out, constitute war crimes.

The report was dismissed by the Israeli Ministry of Foreign Affairs as "narrow", "decontextualized", and disattentive of alleged war crimes perpetrated by Hamas. Amnesty, it asserted, was serving as "a propaganda tool for Hamas and other terror groups."

==== Shelling of UNRWA schools ====
There were seven shellings at UNRWA facilities in the Gaza Strip which took place between 21 July and 3 August 2014. The incidents were the result of artillery, mortar or aerial missile fire which struck on or near the UNRWA facilities being used as shelters for Palestinians, and as a result at least 44 civilians, including 10 UN staff, died. During the 2014 Israel-Gaza conflict, many Palestinians fled their homes after warnings by Israel or due to air strikes or fighting in the area. An estimated 290,000 people (15% of Gaza's population) took shelter in UNRWA schools.

On three occasions, on 16 July, 22 July and on 29 July, UNRWA announced that rockets had been found in their schools. UNRWA denounced the groups responsible for "flagrant violations of the neutrality of its premises". All of these schools were vacant at the time when rockets were discovered; no rockets were found in any shelters which were shelled. The Israel Defense Forces (IDF) stated that "Hamas chooses where these battles are conducted and, despite Israel's best efforts to prevent civilian casualties, Hamas is ultimately responsible for the tragic loss of civilian life. There has been repeated abuse of UN facilities by Hamas, with at least three cases of munitions storage within such facilities."

The attacks were condemned by members of the UN (UNRWA's parent organization) and other governments, such as the U.S., have expressed "extreme concern" over the safety of Palestinian civilians who "are not safe in UN-designated shelters." The Rafah shelling in particular was widely criticized, with Ban Ki-moon calling it a "moral outrage and a criminal act" and US State Department calling it "appalling" and "disgraceful". UN High Commissioner for Human Rights Navi Pillay said that both Hamas militants and Israel might have committed war crimes. A Human Rights Watch investigation into three of the incidents concluded that Israel committed war crimes because two of the shellings "did not appear to target a military objective or were otherwise indiscriminate", while the third Rafah shelling was "unlawfully disproportionate". On 27 April 2015, the United Nations released an inquiry which concluded that Israel was responsible for the deaths of at least 44 Palestinians who died in the shelling and 227 were injured.

==== Infrastructure ====
On 23 July 12 human rights organizations in Israel released a letter to Israeli government warning that "Gaza Strip's civilian infrastructure is collapsing". They wrote that "due to Israel's ongoing control over significant aspects of life in Gaza, Israel has a legal obligation to ensure that the humanitarian needs of the people of Gaza are met and that they have access to adequate supplies of water and electricity." They note that many water and electricity systems were damaged during the conflict, which has led to a "pending humanitarian and environmental catastrophe". The Sydney Morning Herald reported that "almost every piece of critical infrastructure, from electricity to water to sewage, has been seriously compromised by either direct hits from Israeli air strikes and shelling or collateral damage."

Between five and eight of the 10 power lines that bring electricity from Israel were disabled, at least three by Hamas rocket fire. On 29 July, Israel was reported to bomb Gaza's only power plant, which was estimated to take a year to repair. Amnesty International said the crippling of the power station amounted to "collective punishment of Palestinians". Human Rights Watch has stated that "[d]amaging or destroying a power plant, even if it also served a military purpose, would be an unlawful disproportionate attack under the laws of war". Israel immediately denied damaging the power plant, stating there was "no indication that [IDF] were involved in the strike ... The area surrounding the plant was also not struck in recent days." Contradicting initial reports that it would take a year to repair, the power plant resumed operation on 27 October.

==== Attacks on journalists ====
At least 16 journalists were killed in the conflict, (Note: 17 were reported killed, initially. On 14 November, the Director-General of UNESCO, Irina Bokova, retracted a statement she issued on 29 August 2014, regarding Abdullah Murtaja, one of the 17 killed, who was later determined to be an active combatant and, therefore, not a civilian journalist.) of which five were off-duty and two, from Associated Press, were covering a bomb disposal team's efforts to defuse an unexploded Israeli artillery shell when it exploded. In several cases, the journalists were killed while having markings distinguishing them as press on their vehicles or clothing. The IDF stated that in one case it attacked a vehicle marked "TV" that was in military use, although noted in the statement that at the time of the strike the IDF could not discern the markings. Several media outlets, including the offices of Al-Jazeera, were hit. The International Federation of Journalists condemned the strikes as "appalling murders and attacks". The Israeli army said it does not target journalists, and that it contacts news media "in order to advise them which areas to avoid during the conflict". Israel has made foreign journalists sign a waiver stating that it is not responsible for their safety in Gaza, which Reporters Without Borders calls contrary to international law. The intentional targeting of journalists is a war crime.

Israel bombed Hamas's Al-Aqsa radio and TV stations because of their "propaganda dissemination capabilities used to broadcast the messages of (Hamas's) military wing." Reporters Without Borders and Al-Haq condemned the attacks, saying "an expert committee formed by the International Criminal Court's prosecutor for the former Yugoslavia, to assess the NATO bombing campaign of 1999, specified that a journalist or media organization is not a legitimate target merely because it broadcasts or disseminates propaganda."

==== Human shields ====
The UN High Commissioner for Human Rights Navi Pillay accused Israel of having "defied international law by attacking civilian areas of Gaza such as schools, hospitals, homes and U.N. facilities. "None of this appears to me to be accidental," Pillay said. "They appear to be defying – deliberate defiance of – obligations that international law imposes on Israel."" The Jaffa based NGO Physicians for Human Rights stated in a report in January 2015 that the IDF had used human shields during the war. IDF criticized the report's conclusions and methodology which "cast a heavy shadow over its content and credibility". Defense for Children International-Palestine reported that 17-year-old Ahmad Abu Raida was kidnapped by Israeli soldiers who, after beating him up, used him as a human shield for five days, forcing him to walk in front of them with police dogs at gunpoint, search houses and dig in places soldiers suspected there might be tunnels. Some of the key claims could not be verified because his father said he forgot to take photographs of the alleged abuse marks and discarded all the clothing IDF soldiers provided Abu Raida when he was freed, though the IDF confirmed his detention during that time.

The IDF confirmed that the troops suspected Ahmad of being a militant based on the affiliation of his father (a senior official in Gaza's Tourism Ministry) with Hamas and so detained him during the ground operation. The IDF and Israeli authorities challenged the credibility of DCI-P noting their "scant regard for truth". The IDF Military Advocate General opened criminal investigation into the event.

=== 2015–2016 wave of violence ===
During the 2015–2016 wave of violence in the Israeli–Palestinian conflict, multiple human rights organizations documented serious concerns regarding the conduct by Israeli forces.

==== Extrajudicial killings ====
During the wave of violence, several human rights organizations, including Amnesty International and B'Tselem, documented numerous cases of alleged extrajudicial executions committed by Israeli security forces. These incidents occurred primarily during responses to suspected Palestinian attacks, particularly at checkpoints or within urban areas of the West Bank. A concerning pattern emerged in which Israeli soldiers used lethal force against Palestinians who no longer posed an imminent threat—or, in some cases, no threat at all.

For instance, on 22 September 2015, an 18-year-old woman named Hadeel al-Hashlamoun was shot multiple times at a checkpoint in Hebron. Amnesty International concluded that al-Hashlamoun posed no immediate danger and that her killing constituted an extrajudicial execution.

Another example was on 24 March 2016, when Elor Azaria, an IDF soldier, shot a man in Tel Rumeida named Abdel Fattah al-Sharif at point-blank range while already wounded and lying motionless on the ground. In response, Amnesty International demanded action against the shooter, stating that any shooting of an incapacitated person is a "potential war crime", regardless of previous actions. Azaria was eventually sentenced to 18 months in prison.

==== Excessive use of force ====
During the wave of violence, Human Rights Watch documented that Israeli security forces killed at least 120 Palestinians and injured over 11,953 in the West Bank, Gaza, and Israel during this period. These figures include bystanders, protesters, and suspected assailants. The United Nations raised concerns of Israel's excessive use of force against Palestinians in the West Bank.

=== 2018–2019 Gaza border protests ===
In late February 2019 a United Nations Human Rights Council's independent commission found that of the 489 cases of Palestinian deaths or injuries analyzed, only two were possibly justified as responses to danger by Israeli security forces. On 18 March 2019, a three-person United Nations commission urged Israeli authorities to "step up" their investigations into Israeli troops shootings of Palestinian demonstrators during the protests. The U.N. investigators believe that the shootings "may have constituted war crimes and crimes against humanity." The commission of inquiry presented the United Nations Human Rights Council a full 250-page report.

=== May 2019 Gaza–Israel clashes ===
During the clashes in May 2019, Human Rights Watch reported that Israeli airstrikes struck targets that appeared to lack a clear military objective or caused disproportionate civilian harm. For instance, on 5 May, Israeli airstrikes killed 13 Palestinian civilians, including individuals in their homes, a café, and a workplace. HRW noted that these attacks might have violated the laws of war due to the absence of evident military targets and the high civilian toll. On that same day, an Israeli airstrike killed three people in the northern Gaza town of Beit Lahiya, including a pregnant woman.

=== November 2019 Gaza–Israel clashes ===
During the clashes from 12 to 14 November 2019 in Gaza, Human Rights Watch reported that two Israeli airstrikes during this period killed at least 11 civilians, including women and children, in apparent violations of the laws of war. For instance, on 14 November 2019, an Israeli airstrike killed eight members of the al-Sawarka family, five of whom were children and critically injured 12 others. Al Jazeera reported that the family was sleeping in their home in Deir al-Balah when the strike occurred.

=== 2021 Israel–Palestine crisis ===
Human Rights Watch accused Israel of conducting three airstrikes against civilian targets on 10 May 15 May, and 16 May and said there were no military targets in the vicinity at the time of the airstrike. A total of 62 Palestinian civilians were killed in these three airstrikes. Israel disputed these allegations, but IDF Spokesperson Hidai Zilberman said that Israel's actions in Gaza are "as far from pinpoint accuracy as you can get. They're making Gaza City shake." B'Tselem stated that Israel's bombing of residential high rises was a war crime, both because they were inhabited by civilians and because their destruction offered no military advantage, adding that "the message conveyed in the IDF Spokesperson's statement is that no matter how Israel responds or how horrific the results – its actions will be legitimate. This stance is unreasonable, unlawful and empties the fundamental norms of international humanitarian law, which Israel is obligated to uphold, of meaning." According to the OHCHR, 128 Palestinian civilians were killed by the IDF in the conflict, including 40 women and 63 children, with another 2000 injured, including 600 children and 400 women.

In 2021 Amnesty International which documented 'four deadly attacks by Israel launched on residential homes without prior warning', asked the International Criminal Court to immediately investigate these attacks that may amount to war crimes or crimes against humanity.

=== 2022 Gaza–Israel clashes ===
On 7 August, five children were killed by a missile while visiting a grave at the Al-Falluja cemetery. Amnesty International’s research indicated that the explosion was likely caused by guided missile fired by a drone by the Israeli army, raising concerns about the legality of the strike under international law.

== 2023 – present ==
=== May 2023 Gaza–Israel clashes ===
In May 2023, a former PIJ spokesman, Khader Adnan, died in an Israeli prison after an 87-day hunger strike, prompting clashes between Israel and PIJ. On 9 May, Israel launched three separate attacks using precision-guided bombs, killing three senior Al-Quds Brigades commanders along with ten Palestinian civilians, including four children, and injuring at least 20 others. The strikes hit densely populated areas at 2:00 a.m., when most residents were asleep. Amnesty International said that the attacks caused disproportionate harm to civilians, constituting a war crime. Amnesty also said Israel unlawfully destroyed Palestinian homes without military necessity, amounting to collective punishment.

=== Gaza war (2023–present) ===
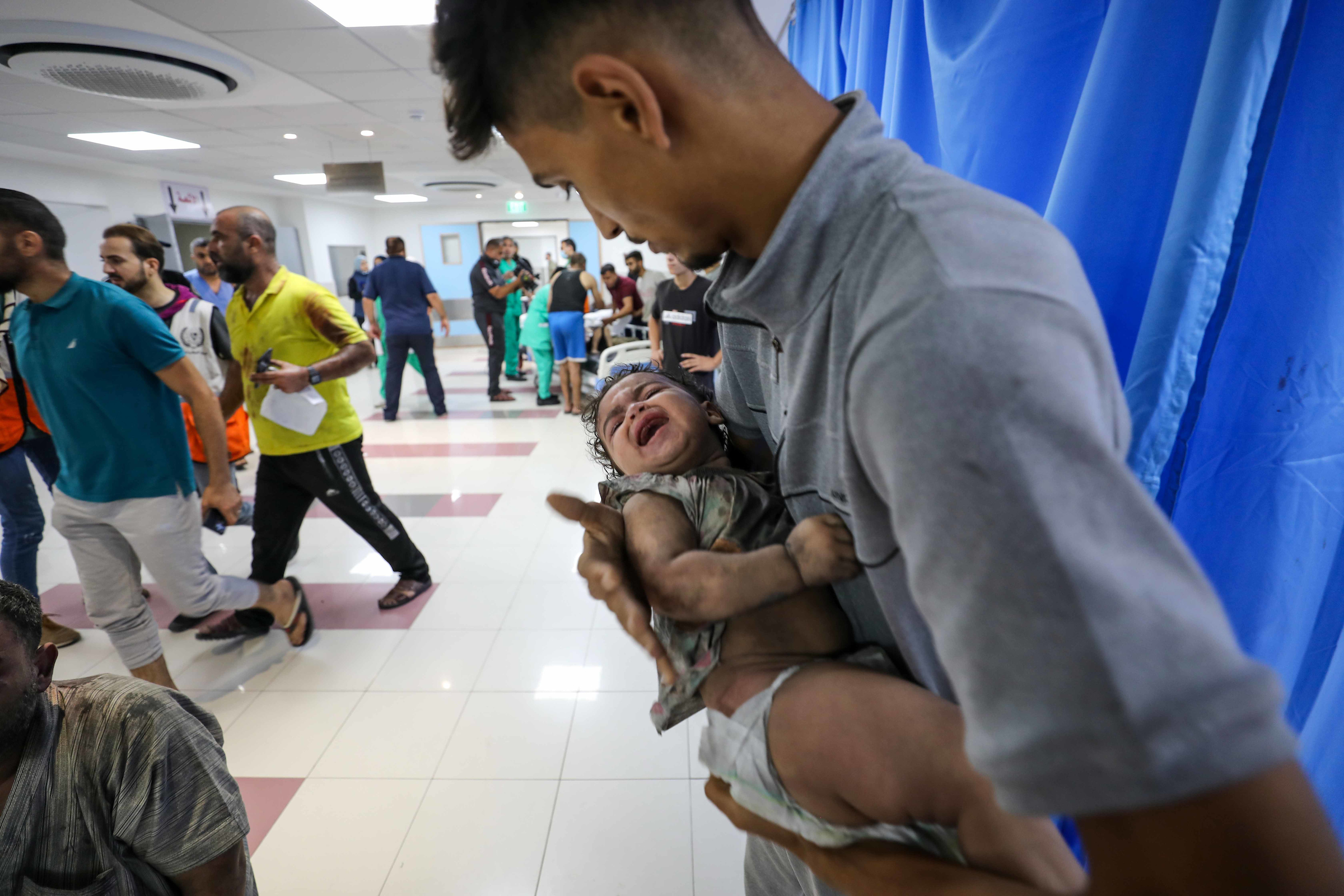
Medics transport an injured Palestinian child into Al-Shifa Hospital in Gaza City following an Israeli airstrike on 11 October 2023.

Since the beginning of the Gaza war on 7 October 2023, the Israeli military and authorities committed numerous war crimes, such as the collective punishment of the Palestinian people, attacks on civilians in densely populated areas (including bombings of hospitals and medical facilities, refugee camps, schools and educational institutions, and municipal services); the torture and executions of civilians; sexual violence including rape; and genocide. Further war crime charges against Israel include forced evacuations, mistreatment and torture of Palestinian prisoners, and the destruction of cultural heritage. Humanitarian organizations such as Human Rights Watch, Amnesty International, B'tselem, and Oxfam, as well as human rights groups and experts, including the UN Independent International Commission of Inquiry and United Nations special rapporteurs, have documented these actions.

Israel has faced legal charges for its conduct in the war. At the International Court of Justice, Israel was charged with committing genocide in Gaza. In May 2024, the International Criminal Court (ICC) issued arrest warrants against Israeli prime minister Benjamin Netanyahu and Israeli defence minister Yoav Gallant for war crimes and crimes against humanity, including using starvation as a weapon of war.

While Israel has faced international condemnation for its alleged war crimes, it has also maintained continued support from the United States. In October 2023, U.S. Secretary of State Antony Blinken indicated the Biden administration had no red lines for Israeli actions where it would stop military support. As Israel's largest supplier of weapons, the U.S. has been accused of complicity in Israel's war crimes.

=== Israel–Hezbollah conflict and invasion of Lebanon (2023–present) ===
==== Killing of Lebanese civilians ====
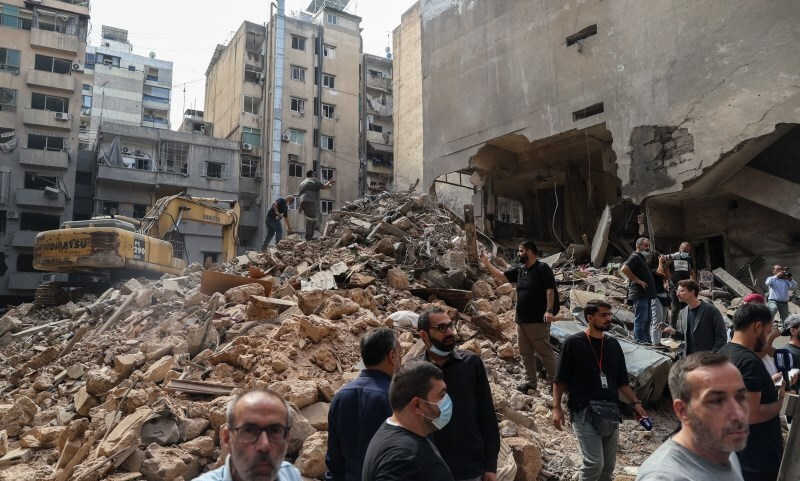
Aftermath of the October 2024 Bachoura airstrike in central Beirut

On 5 November 2023, an Israeli airstrike hit a car near Ainata, Lebanon, killing three children and their grandmother, and injuring their mother. The Israeli military admitted to striking the vehicle. Human Rights Watch stated that their killings was a war crime that warranted investigation. Najib Mikati, Lebanon's caretaker prime minister, called the attack a "heinous crime" and said that Lebanon would file a complaint to the U.N. Security Council.

In September 2024, thousands of wireless communication devices exploded throughout Lebanon and Syria in an attack attributed to Israel, killing dozens of people, including civilians and Hezbollah militants. Lama Fakih, a director of the Human Rights Watch, said that the explosions would constitute an indiscriminate attack if the IDF had no way of accurately determining the location of the explosive devices since there would be no distinction between civilians and military targets. UN High Commissioner for Human Rights Volker Türk said that the attacks violated international human rights since the IDF did not have knowledge regarding the users of the devices or their location and surroundings during the explosions. According to the Syrian Observatory for Human Rights, 232 Syrian refugees were killed by the IDF in Lebanon since the start of the war.

On 24 March 2026, amid the ongoing 2026 Iran War, Israeli Defence Minister Israel Katz announced plans for the IDF to establish a "defensive buffer zone" by occupying southern Lebanon up to the Litani River. This announcement, which followed calls from Bezalel Smotrich for annexation, was expanded on 31 March, when Katz stated that residential structures in border villages would be demolished to prevent the return of approximately 600,000 displaced residents. Since the Israeli offensive against Hezbollah began on 2 March 2026, more than 1.2 million people have been displaced and over 1,200 killed in Lebanon. In March 2026, Thameen al-Kheetan, spokesperson for the Office of the United Nations High Commissioner for Human Rights, said that Israel's deliberate attacks on residential buildings and civilian infrastructure may amount to a war crime.

==== Targeting of journalists ====
According to the Council of Europe, the intentional targeting of journalists constitutes a war crime. During the conflict, Reporters Without Borders (RSF) claimed that the Israeli army had deliberately targeted journalists. An RSF investigation said that Israel had targeted journalists in two missile strikes on 13 October 2023 that killed Reuters reporter Issam Abdallah and injured four others. These two strikes, 30 seconds apart, hit a group of seven journalists in southern Lebanon who were reporting on the border fighting between Israel and Hezbollah. In a video, the journalists are seen wearing vests and helmets identifying them as "PRESS". The marking was also present on the roof of their car, which exploded after being hit by the second missile. The Netherlands Organisation for Applied Scientific Research, which tests and analyses munitions and weapons, assisted Reuters by examining the material collected at the site of the explosion and found that a piece of metal was the fin of a 120 mm tank round fired 1.34 km away from the border from a smoothbore tank gun.

==== White phosphorus ====
On 31 October 2023, after an investigation, Amnesty International stated that an Israeli white phosphorus attack on 16 October was indiscriminate, unlawful, and "must be investigated as a war crime", due to its use on the populated Lebanese town of Dhayra, which injured at least nine civilians. On 2 November, Amnesty International stated its investigations into four incidents on 10, 11, 16 and 17 October showed Israel had used white phosphorus munitions. The claim was confirmed by the Washington Post, which identified two white phosphorus shell casings made in the U.S. Human Rights Watch verified IDF's use of white phosphorus in at least 17 municipalities in Lebanon, including five municipalities where airburst munitions were used over residential areas, and called on the Lebanese government to file a declaration to enable investigations in the International Criminal Court.

In southern Lebanon, Israel's white phosphorus bombs destroyed over 4,500 hectares (45,000,000 m^{2}) of forest with economic loses being valued at US$20 million. The American University of Beirut estimated use of white phosphorus has led to more than 134 forest fires as of June 2024 burning 1,500 hectares (15,000,000 m^{2}) of land. As of 28 May 2024, the Lebanese Ministry of Public Health said that exposure to white phosphorus had injured at least 173 people.

==== Targeting of medical and religious sites ====
The targeting of hospitals, as well as religious sites, constitutes a war crime. Lebanese health minister Firass Abiad said that 163 rescuers and health workers were killed and 273 others were injured in Lebanon since the start of Israel-Hezbollah conflict. Human Rights Watch stated that Israel's "repeated" attacks on medical workers and healthcare facilities were apparent war crimes.

The IDF shelled Meiss Ej Jabal Hospital, injuring a doctor on 10 November 2023. The missiles did not explode but caused damage to the emergency department and several cars. Lebanon's Ministry of Public Health condemned the attack, saying that "Israeli authorities were fully responsible for this unjustifiable act, which would have led to catastrophic results", and called for an investigation. Days before, four people were reportedly injured after an Israeli bombing that hit two ambulances. The Lebanese National News Agency said that an Israeli drone strike hit two ambulances belonging to the Risala Scout Association, which is affiliated with the Amal Movement.

On 26 December 2023, an anti-tank missile shot by Hezbollah fighters from Lebanon damaged a shed in a church compound in Iqrit, but not the church itself, wounding an elderly civilian. As IDF troops and medical services were working to evacuate him, they were hit by further missiles, which resulted in nine soldiers being wounded, one of them seriously.

On 11 January 2024, the IDF conducted strikes in the town of Hanine and targeted an emergency center affiliated with the Hezbollah-linked Islamic Health Authority. The attack killed two workers from the rescue force and destroyed an ambulance. Other attacks on Islamic Health Authority centers occurred in Kafr Kila, Odaisseh and Blida killed 7 paramedic and rescue workers and destroyed 17 ambulances.

On 27 March 2024, an Israeli airstrike targeted a paramedic center affiliated with the Islamic Group in Hebbariye, killing seven volunteer paramedics. The airstrike was condemned by the Lebanese Ministry of Health. Later in the day, Israeli airstrikes in Tayr Harfa killed two paramedics from the Islamic Health Society, while strikes in Naqoura killed one from the Amal Movement-affiliated Islamic Risala Scout Association. On 7 May 2024, Human Rights Watch declared the 27 March incident as an unlawful attack on civilians and said that they did not find any evidence of military targets at the site that was targeted. Investigations also showed that the IDF used an MPR 500 missile to conduct the raid.

On 27 May 2024, an Israeli airstrike near Salah Ghandour Hospital in Bint Jbeil killed three civilians. WHO in Lebanon condemned the attack and called for the protection of hospitals and healthcare workers. In October 2024, the head of Lebanon's Civil Defence in the south said Israel was specifically attacking health workers, stating, "We have had 40 ambulances which have been completely destroyed. On top of that 24 rescuing stations have been hit – just in this area." Lebanese health officials stated on 5 October 2024 that fifty health officials had been killed in the prior 72 hours. Lebanon's health minister Firas Abiad stated the attacks were war crimes and part of Israel's systematic targeting of Lebanon's healthcare system. A November 2024 investigation found Israel had struck in "lethal proximity" to nineteen different hospitals in Lebanon.

On 13 March 2026, an Israeli strike targeted a medical centre in Burj Qalaouiyah, southern Lebanon, killing at least 12 medical workers. The Lebanese Ministry of Health stated that the strike "violated all international humanitarian laws" and human rights groups called any attacks on medical workers as a war crime regardless of political affiliation.

==== Use of booby-trapped devices ====
Experts warned the 2024 Lebanon pager explosions potentially violated international humanitarian law. Josep Borrell, the European Union's High Representative for Foreign Affairs and Security Policy, questioned the legality of the pager attacks due to their high collateral damage among civilians, including the deaths of children. Jeanine Hennis-Plasschaert, the United Nations Special Coordinator for Lebanon, also raised concerns that the attacks were illegal. Belgian deputy prime minister Petra De Sutter went further, calling it a "terror attack." Volker Turk, the UN human rights chief, stated, "International humanitarian law prohibits the use of booby-trap devices in the form of apparently harmless portable objects".

Booby traps are mostly outlawed under the Protocol on Mines, Booby-Traps and Other Devices ("Amended Protocol II") of the Convention on Certain Conventional Weapons, to which Israel is a party. Article 7, paragraph 2 of Amended Protocol II prohibits the use of "booby-traps or other devices in the form of apparently harmless portable objects which are specifically designed and constructed to contain explosive material." The rules of engagement of some countries, such as the United Kingdom, also ban explosive devices disguised as harmless items. The United States Department of Defense Law of War Manual gives watches, cameras, tobacco pipes, and headphones as examples of such items, which are prohibited to "prevent the production of large quantities of dangerous objects that can be scattered around and are likely to be attractive to civilians, especially children".

==== Ceasefire violations by the IDF ====
Following the 27 November 2024, ceasefire agreement between Israel and Hezbollah, brokered by the United States and France, both parties committed to halting hostilities and facilitating Israeli military withdrawal from southern Lebanon within 60 days. Despite this, multiple reports indicate that Israel has engaged in hundreds of actions that were considered violations of the ceasefire.

On 27 and 28 November, the IDF shot at returning civilians in Khiam and flew drones in the area, killing several and wounding more. That same day, the IDF allegedly shelled several Lebanese villages. Additionally, IDF tanks wounded 2 Lebanese civilians. On 26 and 27 January 2025, the IDF killed at least 24 persons and injured more than 130 others who were attempting to return to their homes in southern Lebanon, in villages from which the Israeli soldiers were supposed to withdraw.

=== Red Sea crisis (2023–present) ===
From 20 July 2024, Israel launched Operation Outstretched Arm, deploying warplanes to strike Yemen's port of Hodeidah in retaliation for a Houthi drone that had hit Tel Aviv. The airstrikes ended up killing at least 14 people including twelve workers from the Yemen Petroleum Corporation and injured 90 others. The strikes also destroyed vital civilian infrastructure, including oil storage tanks belonging to the Yemen Petroleum Corporation, container cranes, and power-generating facilities.

Human Rights Watch called the strikes a possible war crime since they were considered as an "indiscriminate or disproportionate attack on civilians".

=== Israeli invasion of Syria (2024–present) ===
In December 2024, Israel invaded Syria after the fall of Bashar al-Assad, advancing ground forces as far as 25 kilometers into Syrian territory and conducting hundreds of airstrikes. According to the IDF, the primary objective of these strikes is to target and destroy strategic weapons depots, missile systems, and military infrastructure to prevent them from falling into the hands of extremist groups amid the ensuing power vacuum.

The attack was met with international condemnation as illegal and a violation of the 1974 ceasefire agreement. UN Secretary-General António Guterres called for an immediate cessation of Israel's actions, citing violations of Syrian sovereignty and territorial integrity. UN Special Rapporteur Ben Saul described Israel's invasion as a "completely lawless" attempt to preemptively disarm the country.

Prior to the Israeli invasion in Syria, Israeli forces carried out attacks on Syrian territory between 2013 and 2024 in their fight against Iranian militias, Hezbollah, and Syrian troops. During these attacks, Israeli Forces killed at least 35 Syrian civilians, according to the Syrian Observatory for Human Rights.

On 28 November 2025, Israel launched an incursion and strikes in Beit Jinn in an attempt to arrest members of the al-Fajr Forces, the armed wing of the Islamic Group. The operation ended up killing 13 people, including two children and injuring 25 others. The Syrian Foreign Ministry condemned the operation and called the incident as a war crime as well as a "horrific massacre".

=== Twelve-Day War (2025) ===
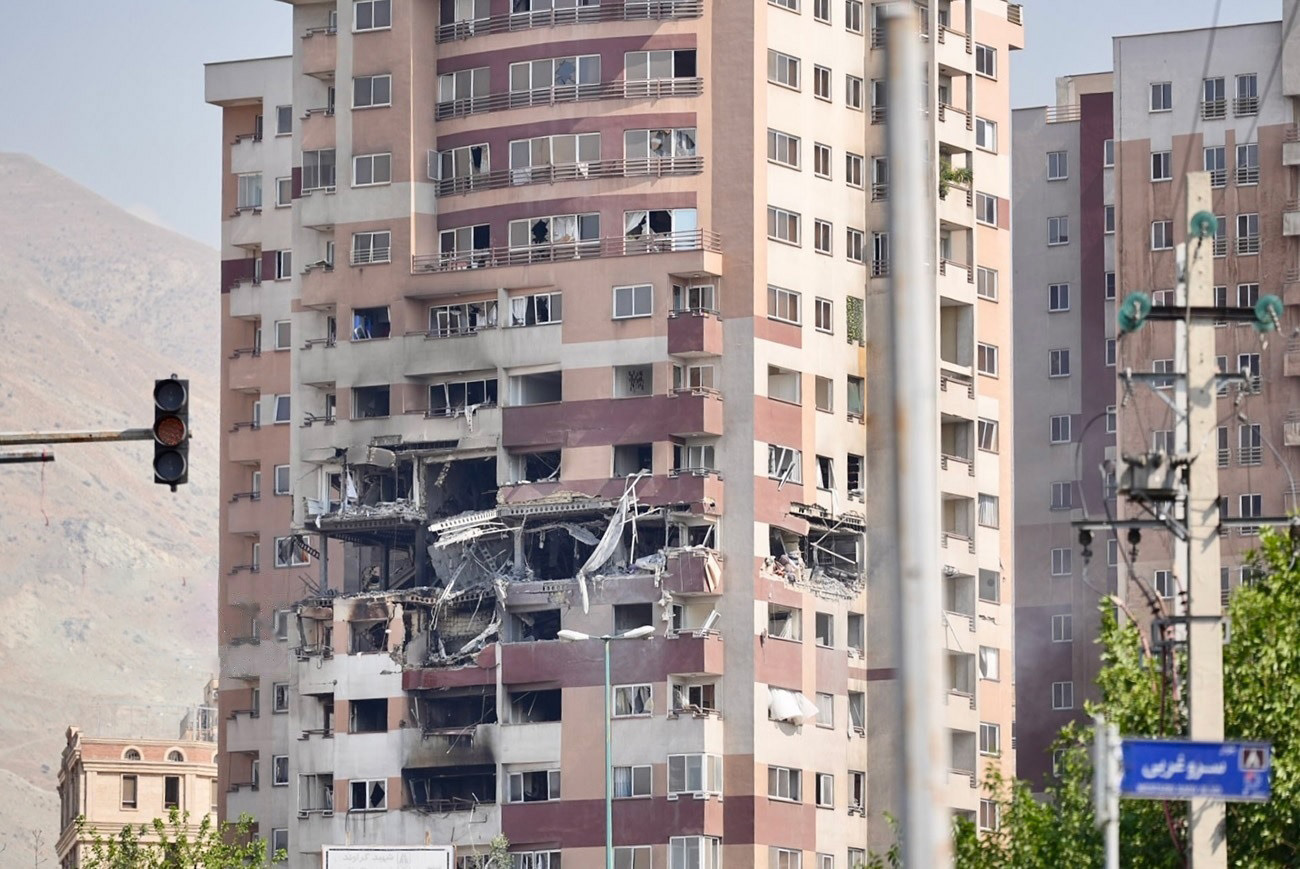
A residential building in Tehran damaged after an Israeli attack

On 13 June 2025, Israel began launching a large-scale military campaign against Iran, known as Operation Rising Lion, targeting over 100 sites including nuclear and military facilities in Tehran, Isfahan, and Natanz. Iranian news agencies reported that the attacks resulted in the deaths of at least 224 people and injured over a thousand others, many of whom were civilians including women and children, and included the damaging or destruction of civilian infrastructure such as energy facilities, a hospital and residential buildings. By the end of the war, more than 1,000 people were killed by Israeli attacks.

These attacks against civilian infrastructure in Iran raised concerns under international law and a violation of the Geneva Conventions. According to the International Commission of Jurists, they released a statement saying that "Israel's attack on Iran violates international law, threatening peace and security" and calling on "Iran and Israel to comply with their non-proliferation obligations and ensure IAEA's access to all their nuclear facilities". According to Marko Milanović, Kevin Jon Heller and Sergey Vasiliev, all scholars of international law, they have described these attacks as a crime of aggression. Other critics, including Australian lawyer and professor of international law, Ben Saul, wrote on The Guardian that the strikes could be considered unlawful acts of aggression.

=== 2026 Iran war ===
In April 2026, more than 100 U.S.-based international law experts signed an open letter published in Just Security, asserting that the U.S. and Israeli military strikes on Iran violated the United Nations Charter and could potentially constitute war crimes. In response, president Donald Trump stated his actions were making "the entire region safer" and dismissed the legal experts, describing them as "so-called experts".

== Other incidents ==
=== Israeli settlements ===
According to Article 8 (2) (b) (viii) of the Rome Statute, "the transfer, directly or indirectly, by an Occupying Power of parts of its own civilian population to the territory it occupies (...)" is a war crime. According to Michael Bothe, this provision was adopted with a view to prosecutions over Israeli settlements. Israel's vote against the Rome Statute's adoption was explained on concerns that Article 8 (2) (b) (viii) would lead to Israel's occupation policy being ruled criminal. In 2017, the country adopted the Settlement Regulation Law despite concerns that it could lead to prosecutions at the International Criminal Court.

According to Michael Lynk, the United Nations Special Rapporteur on the situation of human rights in the Palestinian Territory occupied since 1967, "the Israeli settlements violate the absolute prohibition against the transfer by an occupying power of parts of its civilian population into an occupied territory". He therefore asked international community to designate the Israeli settlements creation as a war crime under the 1998 Rome Statute of the International Criminal Court.

In a 2020 article in Revue des droits de l'homme, Ghislain Poissonnier and Eric David state that "Israel’s establishment of settlements in the Occupied Palestinian Territory includes the elements of the war crime of Article 8 (2) (b) (viii) of the Rome Statute, namely its legal element, its material element and its mental element. It will therefore be easy for the Prosecutor of the International Criminal Court to establish the criminal responsibility of the Israeli leaders, who organize the settlement policy." International law expert Victor Kattan also views the settlements as illegal under the Rome Statute.

As part of the International Criminal Court investigation in Palestine, the criminality of the settlements is being investigated. The underlying facts are well-documented and not disputed, but establishing the court's temporal jurisdiction is less clear. Depending on its interpretation as an instantaneous, continuous or continuing crime, the establishment of settlements prior to 2014 (when the Rome Statute came into effect in Palestine) could also be prosecuted by the ICC. Government officials, legislators, military commanders, and corporate executives could all be prosecuted for their role in the establishment of settlements.

=== International Criminal Court investigation ===
In 2021 Fatou Bensouda, the prosecutor of the International Criminal Court, launched an investigation into alleged Israeli war crimes in the Palestinian territories since 13 June 2014. On 21 November, the ICC issued arrest warrants for Benjamin Netanyahu and Yoav Gallant. Pre-Trial Chamber I stated that it found reasonable grounds that from "8 October 2023 until at least 20 May 2024" Netanyahu and Gallant bore criminal responsibility "as co-perpetrators for committing the acts jointly with others: the war crime of starvation as a method of warfare; and the crimes against humanity of murder, persecution, and other inhumane acts" and "as civilian superiors for the war crime of intentionally directing an attack against the civilian population."

== See also ==
- Criticism of Israel
- Human rights violations against Palestinians by Israel
- IDF admissions to misconduct after initial denials
- List of massacres in Palestine
- Palestinian war crimes
- United States war crimes
- War and genocide

== Notes, citations and sources ==
=== Sources ===
- Adem, Seada Hussein (2019). "Case Selection and Crimes Under the Rome Statute". Palestine and the International Criminal Court. T.M.C. Asser Press. ISBN 978-94-6265-291-0.
- Alpher, Yossi (2015). Periphery: Israel's Search for Middle East Allies. Rowman & Littlefield. ISBN 9781442231023. Archived from the original on 6 March 2023.
- Austenfeld, Thomas; Daphinoff, Dimiter; Herlth, Jens, eds. (2011). Terrorism and Narrative Practice. LIT Verlag Münster. ISBN 9783643800824.
- Bar-On, Mordechai; Morris, Benny; Golani, Motti (2002). "Reassessing Israel's Road to Sinai/Suez, 1956: A 'Trialogue'". In Gary A. Olson (ed.). Traditions and Transitions in Israel Studies: Books on Israel, Volume VI. SUNY Press. ISBN 978-0-7914-5585-2.
- Bilsky, Leora Y. (2004). Transformative Justice: Israeli Identity on Trial (Law, Meaning, and Violence). University of Michigan Press. ISBN 0-472-03037-X.
- Bowker, Robert (2003). Palestinian Refugees: Mythology, Identity, and the Search for Peace. Lynne Rienner Publishers. ISBN 978-1-58826-202-8. Archived from the original on 17 May 2024.
- Cobban, Helena (1984). The Palestinian Liberation Organisation: People, Power, and Politics. Cambridge University Press. ISBN 978-0-521-27216-2.
- Dayan, Moshe (1966). Diary of the Sinai Campaign. Da Capo Press. ISBN 9780306804519.
- Dunbabin, J.P.D. (2014). The Post-Imperial Age: The Great Powers and the Wider World. Routledge. ISBN 978-1-317-89293-9. Archived from the original on 8 October 2022.
- Esber, Rosemarie (2009). Under the Cover of War: The Zionist Expulsion of the Palestinians. Arabicus Books and Media.
- Filiu, Jean-Pierre (2014). Gaza: A History. Oxford University Press. ISBN 978-0-190-20191-3. Archived from the original on 28 February 2023.
- Fisk, Robert (2001). Pity the Nation: Lebanon at War. Oxford University Press. ISBN 978-0-19-280130-2. Archived from the original on 20 September 2023.
- Friedman, Thomas (2006). From Beirut to Jerusalem. New York: Anchor Books. ISBN 978-0-385-41372-5.
- Garner, Bryan A., ed. (2007). Black's Law Dictionary (8th ed.). St. Paul, MN: Thomson West. ISBN 978-0314151995.
- Gonen, Rivka (2003). Contested Holiness. Ktav. ISBN 9780881257991. Archived from the original on 3 October 2024.
- Gonzalez, Nathan (2013). The Sunni-Shia Conflict: Understanding Sectarian Violence in the Middle East. Nortia Media Ltd. ISBN 9780984225217. Archived from the original on 6 March 2023.
- Hanssen, Jens; Weiss, Max (15 February 2018). Arabic Thought Against the Authoritarian Age: Towards an Intellectual History of the Present. Cambridge University Press. ISBN 978-1-107-19338-3.
- Hirst, David (2010). Beware of Small States: Lebanon, Battleground of the Middle East. Nation Books. ISBN 9780786744411.
- Jawad, Saleh Abdel (2007). "Zionist Massacres: the Creation of the Palestinian Refugee Problem in the 1948 War". In Benvenisti, E.; et al. (eds.). Israel and the Palestinian Refugees. Berlin, Heidelberg, New-York: Springer. ISBN 978-3-540-68161-8.
- Klocker, Cornelia (2020). Collective Punishment and Human Rights Law: Addressing Gaps in International Law. Routledge, Taylor & Francis Group. ISBN 9780367332709.
- Kuper, Leo (1997). Andreopoulos, George J. (ed.). Genocide: Conceptual and Historical Dimensions. University of Pennsylvania Press. ISBN 9780812216165.
- Laurens, Henry (2007). L'accomplissement des prophéties. La Question de Palestine. Vol. 3. Paris: Fayard. ISBN 9782213633589.
- Lauterpacht, E.; Greenwood, C. J.; Weller, Marc (1991). The Kuwait Crisis: Basic Documents. Cambridge University Press. ISBN 0521463084. Archived from the original on 24 March 2024.
- Lucas, Noah (1975). The Modern History of Israel. New York: Praeger Publishers. ISBN 0-275-33450-3.
- MacBride, Seán (1983). Israel in Lebanon: The Report of the International Commission to Enquire into Reported Violations of International Law by Israel during its Invasion of the Lebanon. London: Ithaca Press. ISBN 978-0-903729-96-3.
- Masalha, Nur (2003). The Politics of Denial: Israel and the Palestinian Refugee Problem. Pluto Press. ISBN 978-0-7453-2120-2.
- McDowall, David (1991). Palestine and Israel: The Uprising and Beyond. Berkeley: University of California Press. ISBN 978-0-520-07653-2.
- Morris, Benny (1994). Israel's Border Wars, 1949–1956: Arab Infiltration, Israeli Retaliation, and the Countdown to the Suez War. Oxford University Press. ISBN 978-0198278504.
- Morris, Benny (2001). Righteous Victims: A History of the Zionist–Arab conflict, 1881–2001 (1st Vintage Books ed.). New York: Vintage Books. pp. 252–258. ISBN 978-0-679-74475-7.
- Morris, Benny (2004). The Birth of the Palestinian Refugee Problem Revisited. Cambridge University Press. ISBN 978-0-521-00967-6.
- Morris, Benny (2008). 1948: A History of the First Arab-Israeli War. Yale University Press.
- Morris, Benny (2011). Righteous Victims: A History of the Zionist-Arab Conflict. Random House. ISBN 978-0-307-78805-4.
- Pappé, Ilan (1999). "Were They Expelled?: The History, Historiography and Relevance of the Palestinian Refugee Problem". In Karmi, Ghada; Cotran, Eugene (eds.). The Palestinian Exodus 1948–1988. Ithaca Press. ISBN 978-0863722141.
- Pappé, Ilan (2006). The Ethnic Cleansing of Palestine. Simon & Schuster. ISBN 978-1-78074-056-0.
- Prior, Michael (1999). Zionism and the State of Israel: A Moral Inquiry. London: Routledge. ISBN 0-415-20462-3.
- Quandt, William B. (2005). Peace Process: American Diplomacy and the Arab-Israeli Conflict Since 1967. Brookings Institution Press. ISBN 978-0-520-24631-7. Archived from the original on 6 March 2023.
- Sacco, Joe (2009). Footnotes in Gaza. New York: Metropolitan Books. ISBN 978-0-8050-9277-6.
- Sayigh, Yezid (1997). Armed Struggle and the Search for State: The Palestinian National Movement, 1949–1993. Oxford University Press. ISBN 978-0-19-829643-0.
- Segev, Tom (2007). 1967: Israel, the War, and the Year That Transformed the Middle East. New York: Metropolitan Books. ISBN 9780805070576.
- Schabas, William (2009). Genocide in International Law: The Crime of Crimes. Cambridge University Press. ISBN 9780521883979.
- Schiff, Ze'ev; Ya'ari, Ehud (1985). Israel's Lebanon War. Simon & Schuster. ISBN 978-0-671-60216-1.

Tucker, Spencer C.; Roberts, Priscilla (2008). The Encyclopedia of the Arab-Israeli Conflict: A Political, Social, and Military History [4 volumes]: A Political, Social, and Military History. ABC-Clio. ISBN 978-1-85109-842-2.

- Tveit, Odd Karsten (2010). Goodbye Lebanon: Israel's First Defeat. Translated by Peter Scott-Hansen. Cyprus: Rimal Publications. ISBN 978-9963-715-03-9.
- Varble, Derek (2003). The Suez Crisis 1956. London: Osprey. ISBN 9781472895684.
- Zertal, Idith (2005). Israel's Holocaust and the Politics of Nationhood. Cambridge University Press. ISBN 0521850967.
