= Israel–Lebanon ceasefire =

Israel–Lebanon ceasefire may refer to:

- 1996 Israeli–Lebanese Ceasefire Understanding
- 2024 Israel–Lebanon ceasefire agreement
- 2026 Israel–Lebanon ceasefire
