= April War (disambiguation) =

The April War was the 1941 invasion of Yugoslavia.

April War may also refer to:

- Dominican Civil War (1965), known in Spanish as the Guerra de Abril
- Operation Grapes of Wrath (1996), called the "April War" by Hezbollah
- 2016 Nagorno-Karabakh clashes, sometimes referred to as the "April War"
