= United Nations Security Council Resolution 1052 =

UN Security Council Resolution 1052
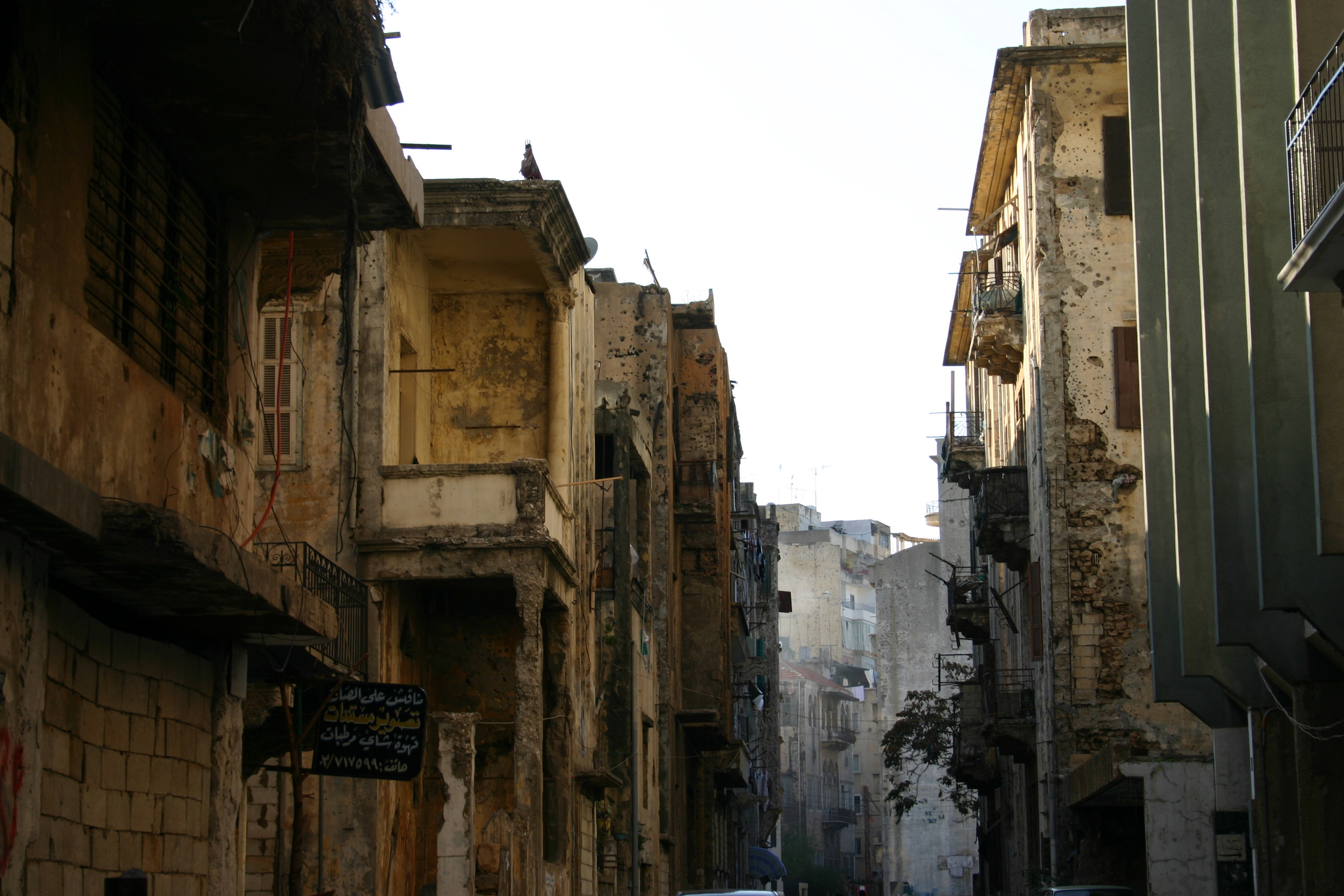
- Damaged buildings in the Lebanese capital Beirut
- Date: 18 April 1996
- Meeting no.: 3,654
- Code: S/RES/1052 (Document)
- Subject: The situation in the Middle East
- Voting summary: 15 voted for; None voted against; None abstained
- Result: Adopted

Security Council composition
- Permanent members: China; France; Russia; United Kingdom; United States
- Non-permanent members: Botswana; Chile; Egypt; Guinea-Bissau; Germany; Honduras; Indonesia; Italy; South Korea; Poland

United Nations Security Council resolution 1052, adopted unanimously on 18 April 1996, after recalling previous resolutions on Israel and Lebanon, including 425 (1978), the Council called for an immediate ceasefire during the Operation Grapes of Wrath.

The Security Council expressed concern at the consequences of the fighting between Israel and Lebanon, and attacks on civilian targets resulting in loss of life, would have on the Middle East peace process. It stressed the need for respect for international humanitarian law concerning the protection of civilians, and was concerned also for the safety of the United Nations Interim Force in Lebanon (UNIFIL) after an attack on a base by Israeli forces on 18 April 1996 resulted in the deaths of civilians.

The resolution called for a cessation of hostilities, and supported the need for ongoing diplomatic efforts to resolve the conflict. It reaffirmed its commitment to the sovereignty, territorial integrity and independence of Lebanon, and called for the protection of civilians and the freedom of movement of UNIFIL. A request was made for Member States to provide humanitarian assistance to the civilian population and to assist in the reconstruction of the country. The Secretary-General Boutros Boutros-Ghali was requested to keep the Council informed on developments in the situation.

A ceasefire was eventually reached on 28 April 1996, in the Israeli–Lebanese Ceasefire Understanding between Israel and Hezbollah.

== See also ==
- List of United Nations Security Council Resolutions 1001 to 1100 (1995–1997)
- South Lebanon conflict (1985–2000)
