= Operation Accountability =

1993 Israeli attack against Hezbollah in Lebanon

- Part of the Israeli-Lebanese conflict and the South Lebanon conflict (1985–2000)
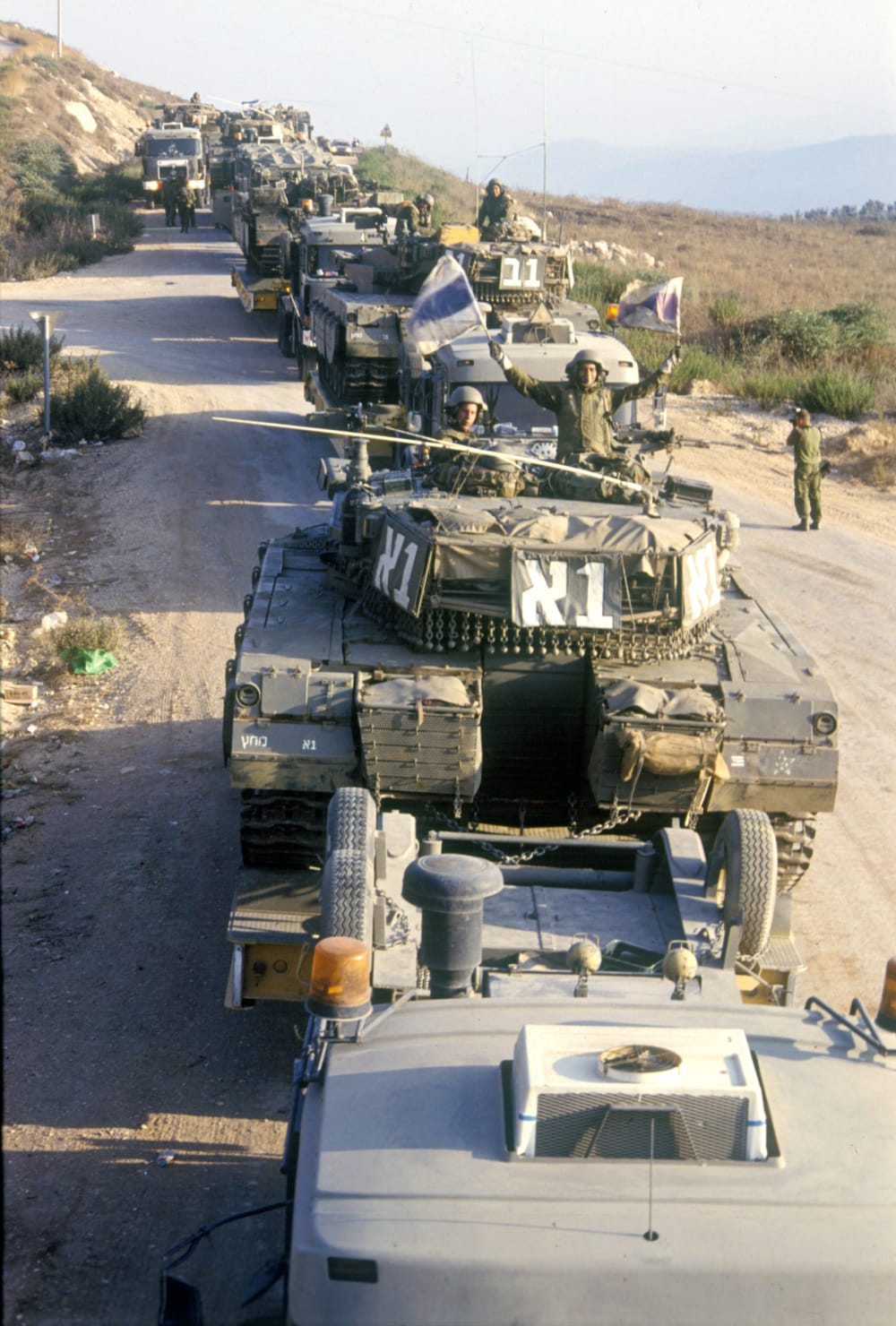
Date	25–31 July 1993 (6 days)
Location	Lebanon and Northern Israel
Result	Ceasefire on civilian targets; much of Lebanese infrastructure destroyed.

Belligerents
Israel; SLA	Hezbollah

Commanders and leaders
(Israel) Yitzhak Rabin; (Israel) Ehud Barak; Antoine Lahad	(Hezbollah) Hassan Nasrallah

Casualties and losses
1 killed; 3 wounded	13 killed
- 2 Israeli civilians killed; 24 Israeli civilians wounded; 140 Lebanese civilians killed; 500 Lebanese civilians wounded; 300,000 Lebanese civilians displaced; 6 Syrian soldiers

On July 25, 1993, Israeli forces launched a week-long attack against Lebanon named Operation Accountability (Hebrew: מבצע דין וחשבון, romanized: Mivtza Din VeHeshbon) in Israel and the Seven–Day War (Arabic: حرب الأيام السبعة) in Lebanon. Israel specified three purposes to the operation: to strike directly at Hezbollah, to make it difficult for Hezbollah to use southern Lebanon as a base for striking Israel, and to displace Lebanese and Palestinian civilians in the hopes of pressuring the Lebanese government to intervene against Hezbollah. The affected civilian population included both Lebanese and Palestinian people.

== Historical background ==
During the Lebanese Civil War, Hezbollah was among several militant groups formed in response to the Israeli invasion of Lebanon. Though chiefly funded by Iran, and later Syria, Hezbollah grew out of Lebanon’s Shia community.

When the Taif Agreement was signed, it amended the Lebanese constitution to end the civil war, and disband all Lebanese militias. Argument then arose over whether Hezbollah's existence in Lebanon displayed a failure of the government, a blind eye, or clandestine support. Hezbollah launched a public relations campaign, political statements and a political program. As a result, the Lebanese government classified Hezbollah's military wing, the "Islamic Resistance" as a resistance movement aimed at ending the Israeli occupation and not as a militia. Thus, the organization was exempted from disbanding and disarming.

The Taif accord called for an Israeli withdrawal from southern Lebanon based on UN Security Council Resolution 425, calling for "all steps necessary" to liberate Lebanese territories from Israeli occupation.

At the time Hezbollah claimed to have 3,000 fighters but some commentators estimated that the actual figure was 600–700. UNIFIL had 580 soldiers stationed in southern Lebanon close to the border with Israel, though other sources state that there were 4,500 troops serving with UNIFIL.

Israeli helicopters attacked a refugee camp near Tyre, 25 June 1993, and two days later they also attacked one of the Shia villages in their "security zone". The following day Hezbollah responded by firing rockets into northern Israel. On 8 July two Israeli soldiers were killed by the PFLP-GC after which an Israeli helicopter fired rockets at their headquarters near Naameh wounding three. A day later three Israelis were killed and five wounded in a clash with Hezbollah. Around the same time an explosion at a Hezbollah depot in the Beqaa Valley, blamed on the Israelis, killed at least five Iranians. On 22 July, an Israeli soldier was killed after Hezbollah fighters overran a SLA position.

== Participants ==
The IDF artillery fired 25,000 rounds. The IAF used 1,000 pound bombs. The Israeli Navy were also used in the bombardments. Hezbollah fired 150 rockets into northern Israel. The SLA, which was cooperating with the IDF, broadcast radio warnings for civilians to leave specific villages and the region on its radio station.

== War crimes ==
According to Human Rights Watch and other human rights organizations, both sides in the conflict violated the laws of war by attacking civilian targets.

During the week-long operation, Israel bombarded thousands of houses and buildings resulting in 300,000–400,000 civilians being displaced from southern Lebanon with 150,000 arriving in Beirut. Of the ninety towns and villages attacked fifty-five were heavily damaged. Israeli forces also destroyed much Lebanese infrastructure and civilian targets, such as major electricity stations and bridges, and have been accused of failing to take adequate measures to minimize civilian casualties, and may have used weapons inappropriate for the environment.

Hezbollah retaliated with rocket attacks on Israeli civilian targets, though it inflicted significantly fewer casualties. They were also accused of hiding small arms in civilian houses.

Ultimately, Israel declared that it attacked Hezbollah targets only to pressure Hezbollah to stop attacking Israeli civilians – while Hezbollah declared similar motive for their attacks along with liberating of Southern Lebanon.

== Outcome ==
A ceasefire was reached after a week, negotiated by the United States, in a form of an oral agreement. Global Security, a US-based organization that attempts to provide accurate facts without opinion, wrote: "An oral agreement was reached whereby Israel agreed to refrain from attacking civilian targets in Lebanon while the Hezballah pledged to stop firing rockets into northern Israel." The agreement, brokered by US Secretary of State Warren Christopher legitimised Hezbollah operations against the IDF inside the security zone. Another consequence of the agreement was the Lebanese army establishing bases in four villages with around 300 troops inside the UNIFIL area adjacent to the security zone. On 19 August seven Israeli soldiers were killed in a Hezbollah ambush near Shahin with one more later dying of his wounds; another soldier was killed in a separate incident. Two Hezbollah fighters were killed in airstrikes near Baalbek and targets close to the Syrian border.

However, that agreement was not completely respected. Hezbollah repeatedly violated the ceasefire agreement by launching rockets from within Lebanon into Israel targeting Israeli civilians. Israel’s next major engagement in an attempt to drive Hezbollah north of the Litani River and end the rocket attacks on Israel, Operation Grapes of Wrath, occurred in April 1996.

In addition to the deaths of 118 Lebanese civilians, a disputed number of Hezbollah combatants were also killed. Lebanese prime minister Rafik Hariri said that eight had been killed, while Israeli prime minister Yitzhak Rabin claimed more than fifty. There were two Israeli civilians killed by Hezbollah rocket attacks. One Israeli soldier was killed, and three wounded. Six Syrian soldiers illegally stationed inside Lebanon were killed in the bombardments.

The Lebanese government announced a reconstruction program under the auspice of the Majlis al-Janub (Council of the South) which was to give households grants of up to LL20 million (£12,000) but there were complaints of the money not arriving. More successful was the Hezbollah program, Jihad al-Bina’ (Construction Jihad), which allowed households to choose the workmen involved in the rebuilding and Hezbollah paid the costs.

In May 2000, Israel left all of the occupied Lebanese territories, in accordance with UN Security Council Resolution 425, twenty-two years after its adoption. Hezbollah was not required by the United Nations or the government of Lebanon to disarm, and has continued to launch attacks against Israel ever since.

No Lebanese government has ever attempted to disarm, prevent, or punish Hezbollah or similar armed groups for doing launching such attacks on Israel. Their failure to do so precipitated the later 2006 Israel-Lebanon war after a 2006 Hezbollah cross-border raid. On 12 July 2006, Hezbollah fighters fired rockets at Israeli border towns as a diversion for an anti-tank missile attack on two armored Humvees patrolling the Israeli side of the border fence. The ambush left three soldiers dead. Two Israeli soldiers were captured and taken by Hezbollah to Lebanon, sparking the war.

== See also ==
- 1978 South Lebanon conflict
- 1982 Lebanon war
- 2006 Lebanon War
- 2026 Lebanon war
- Israeli occupation of southern Lebanon
- Operation Grapes of Wrath

== Bibliography ==
- Bregman, Ahron (2016). Israel's Wars: A History Since 1947. London: Routledge. ISBN 0-415-28716-2
- Tveit, Odd Karsten (2010) Goodbye Lebanon. Israel's First Defeat. Rimal Publication. Translated by Peter Scott-Hansen. ISBN 978-9963-715-03-9
