= Operation Grapes of Wrath =

Israeli military operation in Lebanon against Hezbollah in 1996

- Part of the Israeli-Lebanese conflict and the South Lebanon conflict (1985–2000)
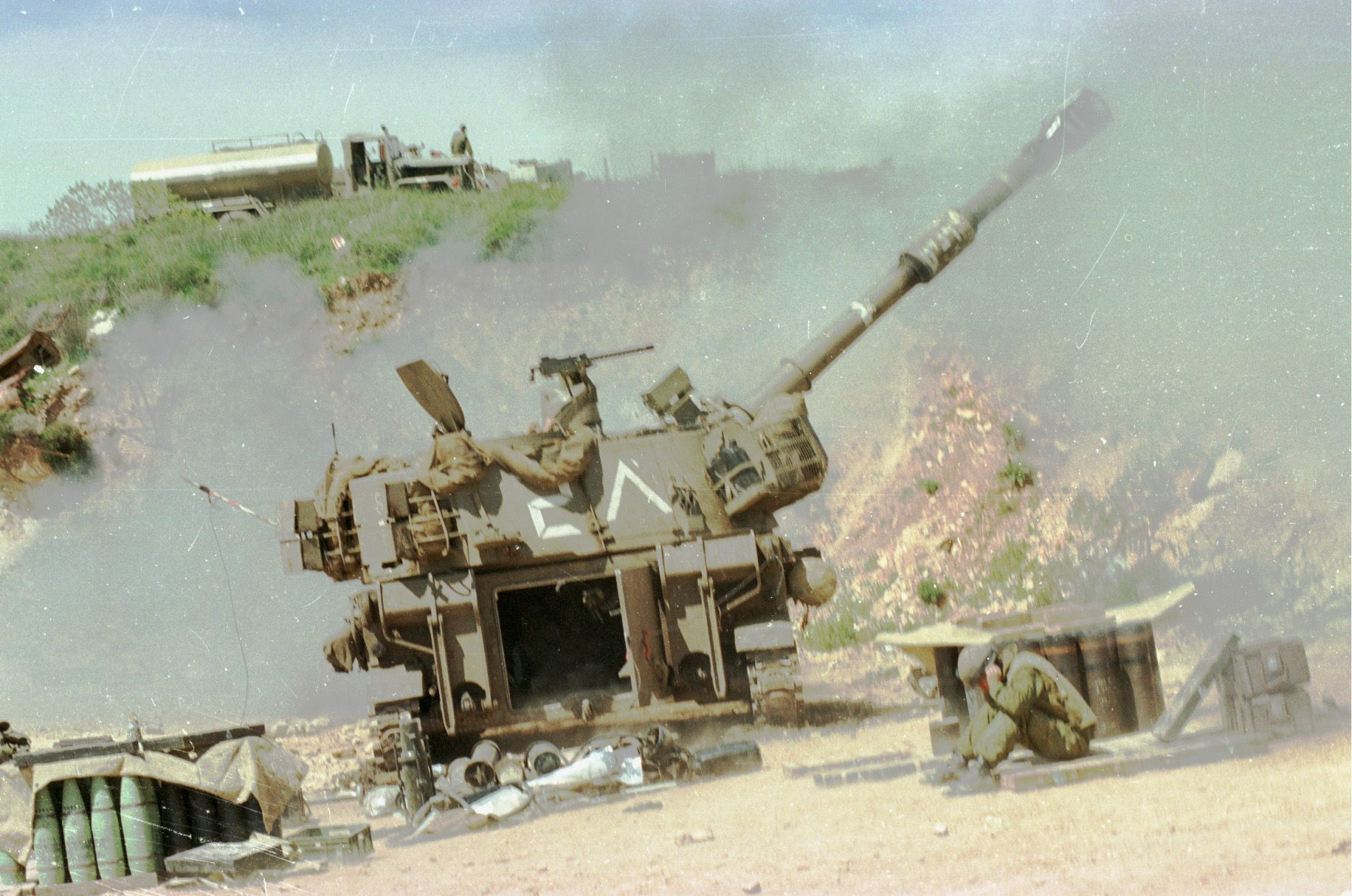
- An Israeli M109 Paladin firing on Hezbollah positions in Lebanon, taken on 15 April 1996
Date	11–27 April 1996 (2 weeks and 2 days)
Location	Lebanon, northern Israel
Result	Ceasefire on civilian targets; much Lebanese infrastructure destroyed.

Belligerents
Israel; SLA	Hezbollah (Ba'athist Syria) Syria

Commanders and leaders
(Israel) Shimon Peres (Israel) Amnon Lipkin-Shahak	(Hezbollah) Hassan Nasrallah (Ba'athist Syria) Mustafa Tlass

Casualties and losses
No casualties	13 Hezbollah fighters killed
- 62 Israeli civilians wounded 20,000–30,000 Israeli civilians displaced 149 – 250 Lebanese civilians killed 354 Lebanese civilians wounded 350,000–500,000 Lebanese civilians displaced

Operation Grapes of Wrath (Hebrew: מבצע ענבי זעם Mivtsa Enavi Zaam), known in Lebanon as the April Aggression (Arabic: عدوان نيسان, romanized: ʿUdwān Nīsān), was a seventeen-day campaign of the Israel Defense Forces (IDF) against Hezbollah in 1996 which attempted to end the Iran-backed group's rocket attacks on northern Israeli civilian centres by forcing the group north of the Litani River, out of easy range of these civilian centres. Prior to the operation, Hezbollah had launched 151 rockets from Lebanon into Israel, killing two Israeli civilians and seriously wounding 24 other Israeli civilians.

In their attempt to degrade and destroy Hezbollah, the IDF conducted more than 600 air raids and fired approximately 25,000 shells, killing approximately 154 Lebanese civilians and wounding 351. Over 100 Lebanese civilians died after the IDF shelled the UNIFIL position in Qana where they had taken shelter. After the outbreak of Israel’s response, 639 Hezbollah cross-border rocket attacks targeted northern Israel, wounding 62 civilians. Hezbollah forces also participated in numerous engagements with Israeli and South Lebanon Army forces.

The conflict was de-escalated on 27 April by a ceasefire agreement banning attacks on civilians.

== Historical background ==
The Israeli army invaded Lebanon for the second time in 1982, in order to stop the Palestinian attacks, starting the 1982 Lebanon War. After three months Israel occupied the capital city of Beirut. Over the next three years the Israeli army partially withdrew. In 1985, it established what it called the "Security Buffer Zone" in Southern Lebanon.

While Israel did succeed in ousting the PLO from Lebanon, armed insurgency by radical Shia organizations emerged in the region. In 1993, Israel responded with a massive attack against the Lebanese Hezbollah (Operation Accountability) to disrupt its actions. The military campaign ended in a ceasefire whose terms included unwritten understandings prohibiting the targeting of civilians. Both sets of belligerents later disregarded the prohibition when particular "red lines" had been crossed, creating cycles of retaliatory violence. Hezbollah continued attacking targets in both Lebanon and northern Israel, including Israeli armed forces, South Lebanon Army militia and civilian areas. The Israeli military shelled targets often in very close proximity to or inside civilian areas, frequently causing the death of many civilians.

On 30 March 1996, two men were killed by an IDF missile while working on a water tower in Yater, Lebanon. Hezbollah responded by launching 20 missiles into northern Israel, and the IDF acknowledged the attack as a mistake. A roadside bomb explosion that caused the death of a 14-year-old Lebanese boy and injury of three others in the village of Barashit was cited by Hezbollah as the reason for firing 30 missiles into northern Israel on 9 April. On 11 April, Israeli officials announced Operation Grapes of Wrath as a retaliatory and preventative action for Hezbollah shelling, which had injured six Israeli civilians.

== Operation ==
In the early morning of 11 April, Israeli aircraft and artillery began an intensive bombardment of Shiite villages in South Lebanon. The declared objective of these attacks was to cause a general flight of the civilian population towards the Beirut area. The humanitarian crisis was intended to put pressure on the Lebanese and Syrian governments to disarm Hezbollah. A secondary objective was to punish Hezbollah directly by destroying any objective connected to the organization.

Israel issued warnings, in leaflets dropped from the air and through the radio station of the South Lebanon Army (SLA), to the inhabitants of 44, later extended to 88, south Lebanese villages to evacuate their homes before 2:30 PM the following day. The attacks on the villages started at 4:30 PM. In the beginning, artillery and air strikes were directed at the outskirts of villages. Later, they were directed at randomly chosen houses.

After an Israeli attack on an ambulance in South Lebanon, Israeli government spokesman Uri Dromi declared that "We gave the residents advance warning to clear out so as not to get hurt. All those who remain there, do so at their own risk because we assume they're connected with Hizbollah." On April 14, an Israeli army spokesman said: "Anyone remaining in Tyre or these forty villages... is solely responsible for endangering his life." According to Human Rights Watch, such warnings were “in part designed to provoke a major humanitarian crisis by internally displacing upwards of 400,000 Lebanese civilians”.

Spreading panic among the civilian population is prohibited by International Humanitarian Law. In a rare public intervention in an ongoing conflict, the International Committee of the Red Cross (ICRC) flatly condemned the Israeli attack on Qana and further stated:

The ICRC draws attention to the fact that there are still almost 60,000 civilians in the areas of southern Lebanon where military operations are taking place. The orders to evacuate an entire region - in this case contrary to international humanitarian law - issued to the inhabitants of villages in southern Lebanon, do not exempt Israel from the obligation to respect the civilians still on the spot.

Israel blockaded the ports of Beirut, Sidon and Tyre. On 12 April, near Beirut, a Syrian military post was bombed by Israeli aircraft, resulting in the death of one soldier and injuring seven others. On 13 April, Israel struck an ambulance in Mansouri, killing 2 women and 4 children. On 14 April the electrical transformer station at Bsalim was hit by an airstike. The following day Lebanon's largest transformer station at Jumhour, five miles east of Beirut, was destroyed. The air-raids left Beirut without electricity.

On 16 April, the perimeter of Beirut Airport was bombed, killing four civilians and two Lebanese soldiers. Twenty-four people were wounded. On 18 April, the UNIFIL base outside Qana was shelled, killing 105 villagers sheltering in the compound.

It is estimated 400,000 people left their homes in southern Lebanon and 16,000 residents of Kiryat Shimona fled south during the bombardment.

== Aftermath ==
According to Human Rights Watch, about 154 Lebanese civilians were killed, and 351 were wounded. Ahron Bregman says that 250 Lebanese were killed in the Israeli attacks, including 106 civilians who died in the shelling of a UN compound at Qana and 9 civilians killed in an attack in Nabatiyeh when Israeli warplanes rocketed a two-story building where they were sleeping. The Israeli air force said that anti-aircraft fire was directed at its planes from the area around the building. Amnesty International was not able to confirm whether or not those said were true.

Some 350 civilians were wounded in Lebanon, according to a 1997 Human Rights Watch report. 62 Israeli civilians were wounded in Israel.

The damage to the Lebanese infrastructure was significant, as major bridges and power stations were destroyed. According to Human Rights Watch, 2,018 houses and buildings in South Lebanon were either completely destroyed, or severely bombarded. Lebanon's economic damage was estimated at $500 million by economist Marwan Iskandar, and endorsed as accurate by the Lebanese Center for Policy Studies. There was an estimated $140 million cost in rebuilding damaged infrastructure, $30 million for assisting those displaced, $260 million in lost economic output, and $70 million in losses due to delays in economic projects.

Israel estimated the total damage it suffered at 150 million NIS, about $53 million. Earlier, the damage to Israeli civilian property was estimated at 20 million NIS, about $7 million. The indirect damage to Israel's tourism industry at 40 million NIS, about $13 million.

Israeli Prime Minister Shimon Peres mounted an intense campaign to persuade the Lebanese that this punishment had come down upon them because of Hezbollah's continued presence and anti-IDF activities, and that they had only to repudiate and dismantle Hezbollah for it to stop. Because of Hezbollah's political activities over the preceding years, virtually the entire Lebanese body politic closed ranks around Hezbollah. There was no mention of "dismantling" Hezbollah, and the agreement—signed by Lebanon, Israel, the United States, France, and Syria—specifically allowed Hezbollah to continue its military activities against IDF forces inside Lebanon.

Hezbollah was very active in the reconstruction in the following months. They later claimed to have repaired 5,000 homes in 82 villages, as well as rebuilding roads and repairing infrastructure. They stated that compensation was paid to 2,300 farmers. According to neutral observers these figures were probably accurate.

=== Response by Al-Qaeda associated individuals ===
The deaths of civilians in Operation Grapes of Wrath and in particular at Qana have been cited by Al-Qaeda as motivations for its actions and policies towards the United States. Mohamed Atta is described in Lawrence Wright's account of the 11 September 2001 attacks to have committed himself to martyrdom in immediate response to the Israel strikes at the beginning of Operation Grapes of Wrath.

In his 23 August 1996 declaration of jihad against the United States, Osama bin Laden wrote, addressing his fellow Muslims, "Their blood was spilled in Palestine and Iraq. The horrifying pictures of the massacre of Qana, in Lebanon are still fresh in our memory." In November 1996, he told the Australian Islamist journal Nida'ul Islam about Qana again, saying that when the United States government accuses terrorists of killing innocents it is "accusing others of their own afflictions in order to fool the masses."

== Ceasefire ==
The United Nations Security Council originally called for a ceasefire on 18 April 1996, in Resolution 1052. In the wake of the Qana massacre, a wave of international condemnation ensued and there was diplomatic pressure on Israel to stop the operation. Hostilities retreated from their escalated level following the reaching of an Israeli–Lebanese Ceasefire Understanding – an informal written agreement – under American diplomatic auspices.

The understanding was announced at 18:00, 26 April 1996, and became effective at 04:00 on 27 April. The agreement barred cross-border attacks on civilian targets, as well as using civilian villages to launch attacks. The Monitoring Committee for the Implementation of the Grapes of Wrath Understandings was set up, comprising representatives from the U.S., France, Syria, Israel and Lebanon. The committee convenes to monitor and discuss infringements of the understandings by the two sides.

== Origins of name ==
The phrase "grapes of wrath" is a reference from the Book of Revelation, chapter 14 verses 19 and 20. It was a well-known idea in 19th century American Christian eschatology, and also appears in the abolitionist hymn "Battle Hymn of the Republic":

Mine eyes have seen the glory of the coming of the Lord:

He is trampling out the vintage where the grapes of wrath are stored;

He hath loosed the fateful lightning of His terrible swift sword:

His truth is marching on.

The irony, and potential controversy, of an Israeli military operation being named after a Christian religious doctrine was not entirely lost on the Israeli press. However, most commentators either believed the title was a reference from the Torah, or that the phrase merely referred to John Steinbeck's novel of the same name, The Grapes of Wrath.

== See also ==
- 1978 South Lebanon conflict
- 1982 Lebanon war
- 2006 Lebanon War
- Israeli occupation of southern Lebanon
- List of extrajudicial killings and political violence in Lebanon
- Operation Accountability
- Qana massacre
