= 1996 Israeli–Lebanese Ceasefire Understanding =

The Israeli–Lebanese Ceasefire Understanding (also known as The Grapes of Wrath Understandings and the April Understanding) was an informal written agreement between Israel and Hezbollah, reached through the diplomatic efforts of the US, which ended the 1996 military conflict between the two sides. It was announced at 18:00 on April 26, 1996.

Under its terms, both sides agreed to end cross-border attacks on civilian targets, and to refrain from launching attacks from using civilian villages. The Monitoring Committee for the Implementation of the Grapes of Wrath Understandings was created, composed of representatives from the US, France, Syria, Israel and Lebanon. It convenes to monitor and discuss infringements of the understandings by the two sides.

In February 2024, it was reported that the 1996 ceasefire understanding was a model for negotiations being undertaken to end the Gaza war.

== Full text of the agreement ==
The full text of the agreement and adjoining letter from US secretary of state Warren Christopher is as follows:

The United States understands that after discussions with the governments of Israel and Lebanon and in consultation with Syria, Lebanon and Israel will ensure the following:

1. Armed groups in Lebanon will not carry out attacks by Katyusha rockets or by any kind of weapon into Israel.
2. Israel and those cooperating with it will not fire any kind of weapon at civilians or civilian targets in Lebanon.
3. Beyond this, the two parties commit to ensuring that under no circumstances will civilians be the target of attack and that civilian populated areas and industrial and electrical installations will not be used as launching grounds for attacks.
4. Without violating this understanding, nothing herein shall preclude any party from exercising the right of self-defense.

A Monitoring Group is established consisting of the United States, France, Syria, Lebanon and Israel. Its task will be to monitor the application of the understanding stated above. Complaints will be submitted to the Monitoring Group.

In the event of a claimed violation of the understanding, the party submitting the complaint will do so within 24 hours. Procedures for dealing with the complaints will be set by the Monitoring Group. The United States will also organize a Consultative Group, to consist of France, the European Union, Russia and other interested parties, for the purpose of assisting in the reconstruction needs of Lebanon.

It is recognized that the understanding to bring the current crisis between Lebanon and Israel to an end cannot substitute for a permanent solution. The United States understands the importance of achieving a comprehensive peace in the region.

Toward this end, the United States proposes the resumption of negotiations between Syria and Israel and between Lebanon and Israel at a time to be agreed upon, with the objective of reaching comprehensive peace.

The United States understands that it is desirable that these negotiations be conducted in a climate of stability and tranquillity.

This understanding will be announced simultaneously at 1800 hours, April 26, 1996, in all countries concerned.

The time set for implementation is 0400 hours, April 27, 1996.

Following is the text of a letter written by U.S. Secretary of State Warren Christopher to Israeli Prime Minister Shimon Peres on 30 April 1996:

Dear Mr. Prime Minister:

With regard to the right of self-defense referred to in the Understanding dated April 26, 1996, the United States understands that if Hizballah or any other group in Lebanon acts inconsistently with the principles of the Understanding or launches attacks on Israeli forces in Lebanon, whether that attack has taken the form of firing, ambushes, suicide attacks, roadside explosives, or any other type of attack, Israel retains the right in response to take appropriate self-defense measures against the armed groups responsible for the attack.

With regard to the prohibitions on the use of certain areas as launching grounds for attacks, the United States understands that the prohibition refers not only to the firing of weapons, but also to the use of these areas by armed groups as bases from which to carry out attacks.

== See also ==
- Operation Grapes of Wrath

== Sources ==
- Israel Ministry of Foreign Affairs, Cease-fire understanding in Lebanon- and remarks by Prime Minister Peres and Secretary of State Christopher
