= Responses to the COVID-19 pandemic in July 2020 =

Aspect of the coronavirus outbreak

This article documents the chronology of the response to the COVID-19 pandemic in July 2020, which originated in Wuhan, China in December 2019. Some developments may become known or fully understood only in retrospect. Reporting on this pandemic began in December 2019.

== Reactions and measures at the United Nations ==
=== 1 July ===
The United Nations Security Council passed resolution S/RES/2532: 'Maintenance of international peace and security', demanding a global ceasefire. The United Nations Secretary-General announced that unless the world acts immediately, with "bold and creative" solutions, the COVID-19 pandemic and accompanying global recession would trigger "years of depressed and disrupted economic growth". The Director-General of the World Health Organization stated that some nations battling the COVID-19 pandemic who had been taking a "fragmented approach" to suppressing the deadly virus, "face a long, hard road ahead".

=== 2 July ===
The Secretary-General informed the Security Council that the COVID-19 pandemic was "profoundly affecting" global peace and security across the globe, and he urged it to employ its collective influence to mitigate the protections crisis facing millions of vulnerable people, including those affected by conflicts. The UN Department of Economic and Social Affairs urged countries' governments to do more support young entrepreneurs in the face of the pandemic as part of a sustainable recovery.

=== 3 July ===
UNESCO senior official stated that increased pillaging of endangered World Heritage Sites during COVID-19 lockdowns will likely result in a large number of stolen artifacts appearing online.

=== 6 July ===
Joint United Nations Environment Programme (UNEP) and International Livestock Research Institute (ILRI) report warns that the world can expect to see other animal-to-human transmission by diseases and states that there is still time to prevent further zoonotic pandemics.

At a High-Level Political Forum to discuss post-pandemic recovery, Mr. Mher Margaryan, vice-president of the UN Economic and Social Council, announced that the future of the United Nations Sustainable Development Goals would "depend on our policy choices today" on the global resolve to act in solidarity.

The United Nations Secretary-General warned that the pandemic had laid bare vulnerabilities to "new and emerging forms of terrorism", such as cyberattacks, bioterrorism and the misuse of digital technology.

=== 7 July ===
The World Health Organization announced that it would shortly issue a brief on the modes of transmission of the new coronavirus, including the matter of airborne transmission. Mona Juul, President of the Economic and Social Council addressed the inaugural meeting of the High-level Political Forum on Sustainable Development, noting that the dramatic impacts of the COVID-19 pandemic had revealed "weaknesses in our systems and societies", warned that “a new dynamic” was needed to address the negative shocks.

=== 8 July ===
New UN research published by the United Nations Office on Drugs and Crime warned of a surge in the trafficking of substandard and faulty medical products, due to COVID-19.

Independent UN human rights expert Saad Alfarargi, Special Rapporteur on the Right to Development, at the second day of the High-Level Political Forum on Sustainable Development, stated that the COVID-19 pandemic had resulted in “a serious setback” for the 2030 Agenda for Sustainable Development, urging prioritisation of the most vulnerable.

The UN Secretary General stated at The Global Summit, part of a five-day virtual event organized by the International Labour Organization, that decent jobs must fuel the COVID-19 recovery in order to "build back better".

=== 9 July ===
The United Nations Secretary-General called on UN Member States to urgently address the ‘unprecedented’ impact of coronavirus on Latin America and the Caribbean, as it now had the highest rates of transmission, exacerbating the severe poverty, hunger, unemployment and inequality in the region.

The World Food Programme and the UNHCR, the UN refugee agency, issued a joint alert calling attention to even greater food insecurity in Africa because of "aid disruption and rising food prices linked to the COVID-19 crisis".

Mohammed Ibn Chambas, Special Representative of the Secretary-General and Head of the United Nations Office for West Africa and the Sahel, warned that COVID-19 and climate change were fueling inter-communal violence and terrorist attacks and inflaming tensions in West Africa.

=== 10 July ===
The World Health Organization announced that COVID-19 cases globally had more than doubled in the previous six weeks, reaching 12 million.

United Nations High Commissioner for Human Rights, Michelle Bachelet, warned that Lebanon was "fast spiralling out of control", resulting in destitution and starvation, due to socioeconomic shocks from the pandemic.

Vladimir Voronkov, head of the United Nations Office of Counter-Terrorism, echoed the United Nations Secretary-General in stating the "need to keep up the momentum" in terms of multilateral action to counter the global threat of terrorism during the pandemic, which was magnifying the threats.

=== 11 July ===
As part of World Population Day, the United Nations Secretary-General highlighted that the pandemic had deepened "existing inequalities and vulnerabilities, particularly for women and girls", while the United Nations Population Fund warned of seven million unintended pregnancies and approximately 31 million additional cases of gender-based violence to come.

The United Nations warned that in Myanmar, the COVID-19 lockdown had laid bare the "stigmatization, discrimination and harassment faced by many LGBTQI people, particularly in rural areas" and committed to assisting the community.

=== 12 July ===
As part of its response to the pandemic, the International Monetary Fund called for tax systems to be reformed, including to reduce tax avoidance and tax evasion reduced, to ensure an equitable economic recovery.

=== 13 July ===
The United Nations launched its annual State of Food Security and Nutrition in the World report, which estimates that "130 million more people may face chronic hunger by the end of this year", with the United Nations Secretary General noting that in much of the world, "hunger remains deeply entrenched and is rising". With United Nations estimates of 1 billion children being outside schooling due to the pandemic, Audrey Azoulay, Director-General of UNESCO, highlighted the need to ensure education for refugee children.

=== 14 July ===
As part of the Ministerial Segment of the High-level Political Forum on Sustainable Development, the United Nations Secretary-General admitted that the planet was not on track year to deliver the Sustainable Development Goals by 2030, stating that "our world is in turmoil", due to the pandemic being "a massive global challenge" and noting that there were 12 million infections, 550,000 deaths, hundreds of millions of jobs lost, and the sharpest decline in per capita income since 1870, with approximately 265 million people facing food insecurity by the end of 2020, double the number before the pandemic. The Secretary-General called on Member States to "turn the tide".

In response to a press question, Dr. Michael Ryan, executive director of the WHO Health Emergencies Programme, called for the issue of school reopenings to be decided as part of comprehensive, data-driven COVID-19 public health strategies, rather than politically driven decision-making processes.

United Nations Deputy Secretary-General Amina Mohammed emphasized the importance of the ‘Women Rise for All’ UN forum in shaping leadership in pandemic response and recovery.

Qu Dongyu, Director-General of the Food and Agriculture Organization, launched its comprehensive COVID-19 Response and Recovery Programme to ward off a global food emergency during and after the pandemic and to provide "medium to long-term development responses for food security and nutrition", costing an initial $1.2 billion investment.

=== 15 July ===
The World Health Organization and UNICEF called for immediate efforts to vaccinate all children in order to avoid the pandemic worsening access, a problem affecting over 100 countries. United Nation Youth Envoy Jayathma Wickramanayake, along with the World Health Organization and the UN Children's Fund, considered via webinar "how young people can maintain good mental health and a sense of wellbeing" during the pandemic.

=== 16 July ===
Mark Lowcock, the United Nations' most senior humanitarian official, warned that the COVID-19 pandemic and resulting recession were set to cause the first increase in global poverty in three decades, pushing 265 million people to the point of starvation by the end of 2020, with an appeal to the G20 for $10.3 billion to fight the pandemic in 63 low-income countries.

The United Nations Human Right Council noted that there was a global rise in women prisoners that was accelerating faster than the rate of male prisoners and that COVID measures were "making sentences worse".

=== 17 July ===
The World Food Programme and Food and Agriculture Organization jointly warned that hunger threatened "to soar to devastating levels in 25 countries in the coming months", pushing the world poorest "closer to the abyss" of famine.

United Nations Secretary-General António Guterres, speaking during the High-Level Segment of the United Nations Economic and Social Council (ECOSOC) session to review progress towards achieving the United Nations Sustainable Development Agenda for 2030, stated that COVID-19 highlighted the need for "renewed, inclusive multilateralism" and leadership by ECOSOC, the UN's main body for deliberative and innovative strategizing.

=== 19 July ===
The United Nations highlighted the plight of hundreds of thousands of seafarers stranded at sea, some for over a year, due to COVID-19 travel restrictions.

=== 20 July ===
With Latin America now being the epicentre of the pandemic, the World Health Organization expressed concern at COVID-19's impact on indigenous people in the Americas.

=== 21 July ===
The United Nations Special Coordinator for the Middle East Peace Process warned that cooperation between Israelis and Palestinians on the COVID-19 pandemic was breaking down, "putting human lives at risk".

The International Organization for Migration warned that fear of the COVID-19 pandemic was causing fresh displacement in war-torn Yemen.

=== 22 July ===
Independent United Nations human rights experts called for Iran to urgently release human rights activist Narges Mohammadi, reportedly ill with COVID-19 symptoms, together with other arbitrarily detained individuals, "before it is too late".

=== 23 July ===
The United Nations High-level advisory board on Economic and Social Affairs released the report Recover Better: Economic and Social Challenges and Opportunities, calling for "an adjusted approach" to economic development and global solidarity in response to the worst recession in decades and first rise in global poverty since 1998.

The United Nations Secretary-General highlighted that the pandemic could provide a new opportunity to resolve long-standing conflicts and address structural problems in the Arab world.

The incoming United Nations ECOSOC President, Ambassador Munir Akram of Pakistan, outlined a triple focus on the pandemic, the SDGs, and climate action.

The United Nations confirmed that it would host its first ‘virtual’ UN General Assembly in September.

The Director-General of the World Health Organization urged people to play their part in preventing further spread of the pandemic, warning of no return to "the old normal" as global cases topped 15 million.

=== 24 July ===
The UN human rights office (OHCHR) reminded authorities in Zimbabwe that the COVID-19 pandemic should not be used as "an excuse to clamp down on fundamental freedoms".

=== 25 July ===
Tapan Mishra, the United Nations Resident Coordinator in Mongolia, warned of a major economic impact from the pandemic and development setback, despite its very few cases of COVID-19.

=== 27 July ===
The World Health Organization urged all countries to make the necessary "hard choices" in order to avoid a new wave of lockdowns and beat the pandemic, as it announced nearly 16 million cases of reported infection worldwide and over 640,000 deaths.

The World Bank's Chief Economist for Africa, Albert Zeufack, launching a new World Bank report, urged African nations to adopt the African Continental Free Trade Area as part of coronavirus economic mitigation measures, due to its potential to increase regional income by around $450 billion.

=== 28 July ===
United Nations Secretary-General António Guterres launched the latest UN policy brief, COVID-19 in an Urban World, noting that cities were 'ground zero' for the pandemic and stating "Now is the moment to adapt to the reality of this and future pandemics".

=== 29 July ===
The World Health Organization stated that the first wave of COVID-19 was still continuing and that the virus was likely not impacted by seasonal changes like other respiratory diseases; it also urged significantly more respect for physical distancing measures to prevent the virus's transmission.

The Food and Agriculture Organization issued a 'call to action' highlighting the plight of hundreds of millions of smallholder family farmers in Asia-Pacific, who produce the majority of the world's food, and whose livelihoods are disproportionately suffering due to the pandemic.

=== 30 July ===
United Nations Secretary-General António Guterres released his latest policy brief on the COVID-19 pandemic (The Impact of COVID-19 on South-East Asia), which examines impacts on the 11 countries in Southeast Asia and makes recommendations for a path to sustainable, inclusive recovery that prioritises gender equality.

The World Food Programme was urgently seeking more international support "to prevent millions of Zimbabweans plunging deeper into hunger" due to the COVID-19 pandemic aggravating an already severe hunger crisis in Zimbabwe.

The Director-General of the World Health Organization warned that, while older people were among those at highest risk of COVID-19, younger generations are "not invincible".

=== 31 July ===
Alicia Bárcena, head of the UN regional body for Latin America and the Caribbean (ECLAC), while noting that the economic crisis caused by the COVID-19 pandemic was "pushing millions more into poverty", affirmed that the public health crisis had to be addressed in order to address the economic crisis.

== Reactions and measures in Africa ==
Map of the WHO's regional offices and their respective operating regions. Africa; HQ: Brazzaville, Republic of the Congo Western Pacific; HQ: Manila, Philippines Eastern Mediterranean; HQ: Cairo, Egypt South East Asia; HQ: New Delhi, India Europe; HQ: Copenhagen, Denmark Americas; HQ: Washington, D.C., US

=== 1 July ===
Zimbabwe's Minister of Media, Information and Publicity Monica Mutsvangwa announced that national parks and wildlife centres will be allowed to reopen, and that restaurants will be able to resume indoor dining.

=== 2 July ===
The African Union revealed that the African continent has lost $55 billion in travel and tourism revenue during the COVID-19 pandemic. The Union's Infrastructure and Energy Committee warned that some African airlines may not survive the economic consequences of the pandemic.

The coronavirus lockdown imposed in Nigeria's Kano State was lifted.

=== 4 July ===
The cabinet of eSwatini was placed in quarantine after Transport Minister Ndlaluhlaza Ndwandwe tested positive for COVID-19 on Tuesday. Restaurants and casinos reopened in South Africa at a reduced capacity with strict social distancing rules in place.

=== 5 July ===
Authorities in Ghana announced that President Nana Akufo-Addo will enter a 14-day self-isolation after coming into contact with an individual who later tested positive for COVID-19.

Health officials in Madagascar placed the region of Analamanga, containing the capital city of Antananarivo, into a second coronavirus lockdown due to a sudden spike in infections. Under the new restrictions, schools and places of worship have been ordered to close and all non-essential travel has been banned until at least 20 July, with gatherings of more than fifty individuals also prohibited.

Newly elected President of Malawi Lazarus Chakwera announced that both his inauguration ceremony and the country's Independence Day celebrations would be scaled back due to public health concerns.

=== 6 July ===
Kenyan President Uhuru Kenyatta revealed his government's plan for a phased reopening of the Kenyan economy. International flights are scheduled to resume from 1 August, and travel bans in the cities of Nairobi, Mombasa and Mandera will be lifted on 7 July, although the country's curfew was extended for an additional month.

=== 8 July ===
Murtala Muhammed International Airport and Nnamdi Azikiwe International Airport in the Nigerian cities of Lagos and Abuja reopened for domestic flights, with all of the country's airports scheduled to be operational again by 15 July.

Certain businesses were allowed to reopen in the Sudanese capital of Khartoum, including restaurants, markets and non-essential shops, although the nationwide curfew will remain in place for the foreseeable future.

=== 10 July ===
Algerian authorities announced that some travel restrictions will be reimposed to slow the spread of coronavirus. Under the new restrictions, travel will be suspended to and from 29 provinces, including the capital Algiers, for a week, and testing capacity will be increased by allowing all private laboratories to conduct tests.

=== 12 July ===
South African President Cyril Ramaphosa reinstated a law prohibiting the sale of alcohol to reduce the number of people admitted to hospital with alcohol-related injuries, in order to increase capacity for treating coronavirus patients, over concerns of potential shortages of hospital beds in the country. A night curfew was also reinstated to reduce traffic-related accidents, and masks were made mandatory in public.

=== 13 July ===
South African health officials announced that a curfew will be reimposed from 20 July and that face masks will be mandatory in all indoor spaces and vehicles in an attempt to slow the spread of coronavirus in the country.

=== 14 July ===
The South African Democratic Teachers Union urged education authorities to close all schools in South Africa due to the rapidly rising coronavirus cases in the country, with general secretary Mukwena Maluleke highlighting evidence suggesting that cases have been rising quicker since the reopening of schools, and that schools remaining open in the current situation puts students and staff at a greater risk of contracting COVID-19.

=== 15 July ===
International flights were permitted to resume from airports in Senegal after being suspended for four months. All arriving travellers are required to provide evidence of a negative COVID-19 test result received in the last week; the country's land borders and ports remain closed.

=== 16 July ===
President of the International Olympic Committee Thomas Bach announced that the 2022 Summer Youth Olympics, scheduled to be held in the Senegalese capital of Dakar, will be postponed to 2026 due to the postponement of several international sporting events and the economic consequences of the COVID-19 pandemic.

Health workers in Zimbabwe issued a two weeks' strike notice to the country's government due to low wages and the lack of protective equipment needed to treat coronavirus patients safely.

=== 19 July ===
Nigerian Foreign Minister Geoffrey Onyeama announced that he would be self-isolating after testing positive for COVID-19, becoming the first member of the Nigerian Cabinet to do so.

The United Nations issued an urgent appeal to member states to provide almost $300 million in financial aid to Sudan, in order to assist the country in mitigating the COVID-19 pandemic and also dealing with the economic consequences.

=== 21 July ===
South Africa's Labour Minister Thulas Nxesi and Minister of Mineral Resources Gwede Mantashe were both separately admitted to hospital after testing positive for coronavirus over a week ago.

President of Zimbabwe Emmerson Mnangagwa announced that a night-time curfew will be enforced from 22 July to slow the spread of coronavirus in the country.

=== 22 July ===
President of the Democratic Republic of the Congo Félix Tshisekedi lifted the country's health emergency imposed to control the coronavirus outbreak due to a sustained drop in new deaths. Tshisekedi revealed a three-stage plan to reopen the country's schools, businesses and international borders; from 23 July, non-essential businesses including banks and restaurants will be permitted to reopen, as well as social gatherings and public transport.

Managers at restaurants and bars in South Africa urged the government to lift coronavirus restrictions preventing the sale of alcohol after 9pm, claiming that such services provide vital sources of income for businesses.

=== 23 July ===
The African Development Bank announced an aid package worth $285 million to assist several countries in the Sahel region to fight the pandemic. Under the scheme, Niger will receive $110 million, Burkina Faso $55 million and Mali $50 million in loans and grants, and Chad will receive $60 million and Mauritania $10 million in grants.

South African President Cyril Ramaphosa announced that all public schools in the country will close from 27 July for four weeks to attempt to limit the transmission of coronavirus, as the number of confirmed cases in South Africa passed 400,000. Ramaphosa also revealed a 500 billion rand ($30 billion) economic support package to fund the healthcare sector in fighting the pandemic.

=== 24 July ===
The health ministry of Senegal announced that four new coronavirus testing centres will be constructed in the capital Dakar to increase the testing capacity for arriving travellers.

=== 25 July ===
South African Trade Minister Ebrahim Patel tested positive for COVID-19, and thus he and all ministers who he had come into contact with entered a period of self-isolation.

=== 26 July ===
President of Madagascar Andry Rajoelina opened a new coronavirus testing centre in the capital city of Antananarivo, able to accommodate up to 250 patients expressing severe coronavirus symptoms, in response to surging cases overwhelming the country's healthcare system.

=== 27 July ===
President of Kenya Uhuru Kenyatta extended the country's curfew by thirty days to reduce community transmission of coronavirus, ordered restaurants to close an hour earlier and banned the sale of alcohol, and instructed bars to remain closed indefinitely. It was also announced that schools and leisure centres could potentially be converted into quarantine facilities if required.

Nigeria's Ministry of Education announced that secondary schools will be permitted to reopen from 4 August for students preparing for the West African Examination, scheduled to begin from on 17 August.

The executive board of the International Monetary Fund approved $4.3 billion in financial aid to assist South African authorities in mitigating the COVID-19 pandemic.

The Parliament of Zimbabwe suspended most parliamentary activities after two lawmakers tested positive for COVID-19.

=== 29 July ===
President of The Gambia Adama Barrow announced that he will be self-isolating for two weeks after vice-President Isatou Touray tested positive for COVID-19. Touray urged the public to wear face masks and adhere to government guidelines.

=== 31 July ===
Authorities in Botswana's capital city of Gaborone reimposed a coronavirus lockdown for two weeks following a surge in infections. Under the new restrictions, people are only permitted to leave their homes for essential reasons, with all social gatherings strictly prohibited; non-essential businesses including restaurants, gyms and hotels were also ordered to close.

Namibian President Hage Geingob announced that all nursery and primary schools in the country, as well as the first two years of high schools, will be closed for four weeks from 4 August to slow the spread of coronavirus, with the social gathering limit decreased from 250 to 100; restaurants and pubs will also be prohibited from selling alcohol. However, an easing of restrictions for international travellers was also announced, with arriving travellers not required to undergo a 14-day quarantine if they present evidence of a negative COVID-19 test result taken at most three days before travel.

== Reactions and measures in the Americas ==
=== 1 July ===
United States Secretary of Health and Human Services Alex Azar announced that the American government has purchased nearly all of the next three months' estimated production of the only licensed COVID-19 therapeutic, remdesivir, from the biopharmaceutical company Gilead Sciences for use in American hospitals, prompting both domestic and international criticism.

California Governor Gavin Newsom ordered the closure of most indoor businesses in 19 counties.

Mayor of New York City Bill de Blasio delayed the planned resumption of indoor dining at restaurants in the city over concerns of a possible rise in infections.

Google announced that the company's offices in the US would remain closed until 7 September after initially being scheduled to reopen on 6 July. The reopening was postponed in response to the surge in coronavirus cases in the country.

=== 2 July ===
Cuba eased lockdown restrictions in the capital city Havana, as the remainder of the country moved from phase two to phase three. Under the new restrictions in Havana, public transport resumed and beaches reopened, although the government maintained strict social distancing rules and the wearing of face masks.

=== 3 July ===
Brazilian President Jair Bolsonaro vetoed a law requiring people to wear face masks in shops, schools and places of worship, stating that such a law could lead to violation of property rights.

Mayor of Miami-Dade County Carlos A. Giménez imposed an indefinite curfew overnight for the Independence Day holiday weekend. Giménez also delayed the scheduled reopening of entertainment venues including theatres and casinos due to a spike in cases in Florida.

Governor of Texas Greg Abbott introduced legislation making it mandatory to wear a face mask in public due to rising cases of coronavirus in Texas, with fines of up to $250 for those who are caught not wearing a mask.

=== 4 July ===
Authorities in Mexico announced that additional health checkpoints will be installed along the Mexico-United States border over concerns of a potential surge of border crossings during the Independence Day holiday weekend in the United States.

United States President Donald Trump extended the country's Paycheck Protection Program relief fund for businesses to 8 August.

=== 5 July ===
President of Chile Sebastián Piñera revealed an economic stimulus package of $1.5 billion to assist the country's struggling economy during the pandemic. The measures available include access to zero-interest loans and subsidised rent.

President of El Salvador Nayib Bukele delayed moving the country into the second phase of lifting coronavirus lockdown restrictions to 21 July, blaming the increasing number of cases.

=== 6 July ===
Governor of São Paulo João Doria stated that the Brazilian government will start the third phase of clinical trials of a potential vaccine for COVID-19 developed by Chinese biopharmaceutical company Sinovac Biotech on 20 July, involving 9,000 volunteers.

Mayor of Miami-Dade Carlos A. Giménez announced that restaurants must close their indoor dining areas again due to the rapidly rising coronavirus cases in Florida. This comes as the US death toll reached 130,000.

US President Donald Trump stated via Twitter that he wants to see all schools in the country reopen after the summer break, despite rising coronavirus cases.

=== 7 July ===
Brazilian President Jair Bolsonaro tested positive for COVID-19.

Director of the National Institute of Allergy and Infectious Diseases Anthony Fauci urged the public to wear face masks in public as a result of the surging coronavirus cases in the US. This came as United States President Donald Trump formally withdrew the US from the World Health Organization.

Organisers of the Republican Party's annual convention in Jacksonville announced that all attendees will be required to have a test for coronavirus before entering the convention.

=== 8 July ===
Brazilian President Jair Bolsonaro vetoed a law requiring the federal government of Brazil to provide indigenous communities with COVID-19, including provisions of drinking water and medication. In response to Bolsonaro testing positive for COVID-19 on 7 July, RecordTV and Empresa Brasil de Comunicação announced that journalists who had interviewed the president would be required to produce evidence of a negative test result before being allowed to resume work.

Health authorities in Chile announced that some coronavirus lockdown restrictions can be lifted in Los Ríos Region and Aysén Region from 13 July. Under the eased restrictions, non-essential businesses including theatres and restaurants will be permitted to reopen at a reduced capacity, and sporting events can resume with a maximum crowd size of fifty people outdoors.

Governor of New Jersey Phil Murphy announced that the wearing of face masks in public spaces outdoors will be made mandatory.

New York City Mayor Bill de Blasio stated that students will not reopen fully after the summer break due to health concerns. Students will only attend physical lessons for at most three days a week, with the remainder of education taking place virtually.

=== 9 July ===
Bolivian President Jeanine Áñez tested positive for COVID-19, and announced that she would continue to work whilst self-isolating at home.

Mayor of the Brazilian city of Rio de Janeiro Marcelo Crivella announced that the city's beaches will only officially reopen when a vaccine for COVID-19 is found.

The United States Department of Labor revealed that a further 1.3 million Americans applied for unemployment benefits in the last week.

American coffee company Starbucks announced that face coverings will be mandatory at all stores in the US from 15 July.

=== 10 July ===
Mayor of Bogotá Claudia López Hernández will raise the Colombian capital's COVID-19 alert level to amber on 13 July, with intensive care units on red alert, due to surging coronavirus cases. López also stated that a "strict quarantine" will be imposed.

Governor of California Gavin Newsom announced that up to 8,000 prisoners will be released from the state's prisons in an effort to slow the spread of the coronavirus throughout the facilities.

Players and owners of the National Hockey League in the US and Canada approved an agreement to resume the season from 1 August in Toronto and Edmonton, although all games will be played without audiences due to the risk of transmission of COVID-19.

=== 11 July ===
Magic Kingdom and Animal Kingdom at Walt Disney World Resort in Orlando, Florida reopened to the public with a reduced capacity, mandatory temperature checks on arrival, hand sanitising stations throughout the park, and the requirement to wear a face mask. It had been previously announced that all live performances would be suspended when the park reopens to lower the risk of transmission.

United States Ambassador to the United Nations Andrew Bromberg stated that the US Government welcomed the inquiry launched by the World Health Organization into the origins of the COVID-19 pandemic in China.

=== 12 July ===
Health authorities in the Brazilian state of Santa Catarina announced that a football match between Associação Chapecoense de Futebol and Avaí FC would be cancelled after 14 players tested positive for COVID-19.

In the United States, a Major League Soccer game between D.C. United and Toronto FC was postponed after one of the players tested positive for COVID-19.

=== 13 July ===
In Canada, Premier of Ontario Doug Ford announced that the province will enter the third stage of reopening from 17 July, with nearly all businesses and public spaces being permitted to reopen, as well as allowing gatherings of up to fifty people indoors and a hundred people outdoors, although a strict social distance of at least two metres must be maintained.

Authorities in Honduras extended the country's curfew by a week in an attempt to control the spread of coronavirus.

Governor of California Gavin Newsom announced that all restaurants, museums, leisure centres, bars and cinemas must close across the state due to surging coronavirus cases, with places of worship, gyms, shopping centres and salons being forced to close in the worst-affected counties. In response, the Los Angeles Unified School District and San Diego Unified School District announced that all education will resume online after the summer break in August.

Organisers of the 2020 Chicago Marathon, scheduled to be held on 11 October, cancelled the event in response to rising coronavirus cases in the US, with scheduled participants offered the choice of either receiving a refund or deferring their place to a future event.

The Treefort Music Fest in Boise, Idaho, which initially had been postponed to September 2020 was further postponed to September 2021 and/or March 2022.

The City Of Toronto cancels all event permits and festivals until 30 September.

=== 14 July ===
Director of the United States Centers for Disease Control and Prevention Robert R. Redfield stated that the COVID-19 pandemic in the US could be controlled in as little as eight weeks if all Americans wore face masks.

Secretary-General of the United Nations António Guterres warned that the pandemic has the potential to push the world back "years and even decades" in terms of economic progression, with estimates suggesting 100 million people could be forced into extreme poverty during the pandemic.

=== 15 July ===
The United States Department of Health and Human Services announced that the American government will take direct control of all coronavirus-related data from the Centers for Disease Control and Prevention, which has been criticised for its slow and inconsistent reporting throughout the pandemic. All information will be sent to computer databases in Washington, D.C.

Managers at the American retail corporation Walmart announced that customers will be required to wear face masks in-store from 20 July amid rising coronavirus cases in the US.

Organisers of the 2021 Rose Parade, scheduled to be held in Pasadena, California on 1 January, cancelled the event due to concerns over coronavirus; this is the first time the event has been cancelled since World War II.

=== 16 July ===
United States Secretary of Homeland Security Chad Wolf announced that the American borders with Mexico and Canada will remain closed to non-essential travel until at least 20 August to prevent further spread of COVID-19, with Canadian authorities stating that there may be increased surveillance and enforcement along the country's border.

Governor of Arkansas Asa Hutchinson and Governor of Colorado Jared Polis announced that it will now be mandatory to wear a face mask in public in the states of Arkansas and Colorado. The Governor of Georgia Brian Kemp continues to receive criticism for preventing cities in the state from mandating the wearing of face masks in public, arguing that cities do not have the statutory authority to make such a decision.

Governor of New York Andrew Cuomo stated that New York City is "not ready" to reopen shopping centres and museums even if authorities move into the next phase of reopening. Cuomo stated that no additional indoor activity will open in the state during the fourth phase of reopening due to the risk of coronavirus transmission.

The US Centers for Disease Control and Prevention extended the ban on cruise ships sailing in U.S. waters to 30 September, due to the rapidly rising coronavirus cases in the country.

President of Venezuela Nicolás Maduro announced that coronavirus restrictions will be tightened in the cities of Caracas and Cumaná, and the states of Miranda and Zulia following a rise in infections. Under the "Level 1 - Radical Quarantine" measures, people can only leave their homes for essential reasons, and all non-essential businesses were forced to close.

=== 17 July ===
Canadian Prime Minister Justin Trudeau revealed further details about the Canadian government's $14 billion economic recovery programme, to restart the economy after the COVID-19 pandemic. Measures included in the programme include contact tracing, providing appropriate PPE to healthcare workers, assisting financially struggling municipalities to pay operating costs, and improving long-term social care for the elderly.

United States Secretary of the Treasury Steven Mnuchin stated that policymakers should consider blanket loan forgiveness for smaller businesses that received funding from the Paycheck Protection Program, and also stated that additional funds could be made available, with businesses badly affected potentially entitled to a second emergency loan.

Governor of Georgia Brian Kemp announced that he would be suing authorities in the city of Atlanta after Mayor Keisha Lance Bottoms attempted to introduce legislation requiring residents to wear face masks in public spaces; Kemp claims that city officials do not have the authority to make such a decision.

=== 18 July ===
The 2020 Indianapolis 500 was delayed until August of the same year.

=== 19 July ===
President of Chile Sebastian Piñera revealed his government's plan to gradually reopen the country's economy after a sustained fall in daily infections. Officials stated that the programme will take place for five weeks, although any progress would be subject to epidemiological data and the capacity of the country's healthcare system.

President of El Salvador Nayib Bukele announced that the country will move into the second phase of reopening after the COVID-19 pandemic, with manufacturing industries and public transport scheduled to reopen on 21 July.

=== 20 July ===
Bahamian Prime Minister Hubert Minnis announced that the country's borders will be closed to international flights and ships from 22 July; Minnis stated that the UK, USA and Canada would be exempt from the restrictions.

Despite announcing yesterday that El Salvador would move into the second phase of reopening after the COVID-19 pandemic, President Nayib Bukele postponed all further reopening plans for the foreseeable future after discussions with health experts.

United States President Donald Trump announced that the government's daily coronavirus briefings will resume this week.

=== 21 July ===
Regional Director for the Americas at the World Health Organization Carissa Etienne stated that the COVID-19 pandemic is still rapidly spreading through in the Americas and is showing "no signs of slowing down".

Advanced trials of a potential COVID-19 vaccine being developed by Chinese biopharmaceutical company Sinovac Biotech and the Instituto Butantan began in the Brazilian state of São Paulo, involving around 900 volunteers employed in the healthcare sector. Brazilian Health Minister Eduardo Pazuello also revealed that the government was in discussions with American pharmaceutical company Moderna to potentially get priority in purchasing a possible COVID-19 vaccine being developed by the company.

United States Minority Senate Leader Chuck Schumer urged leaders of the Republican Party to present details for further coronavirus legislation in the United States Congress.

=== 22 July ===
The National Football League announced that all spectators will be required to wear face masks when the season resumes in September to reduce the risk of coronavirus transmission.

Mayor of Washington, D.C. Muriel Bowser announced that face masks will be made compulsory in all areas outside of the home due to a recent rise in cases in the city, with authorities citing the effectiveness of similar orders elsewhere in reducing transmission of the virus. Exceptions to the rule include children under three, exercising at a suitable distance from others, and working alone in an office. This comes as President Donald Trump urged Americans to wear face masks in public, the first time he has advocated such a measure.

The United States Department of Health and Human Services announced that the U.S. government will pay the pharmaceutical companies Pfizer and BioNTech $1.95 billion to produce an initial order of 100 million doses of a potential COVID-19 vaccine, with the government then able to acquire an additional 500 million doses.

=== 23 July ===
Bolivia's Plurinational Electoral Organ postponed the country's general election, scheduled to be taking place in early September, to 18 October as a result of restrictions imposed to mitigate the COVID-19 pandemic and experts predicting that the virus will spike in Bolivia in August or September.

The Chilean Parliament passed legislation allowing citizens to withdraw up to 10 per cent of their pension savings to reduce the economic consequences of the COVID-19 pandemic, although President Sebastian Piñera must sign it into effect.

Mexican Foreign Affairs Minister Marcelo Ebrard stated that Chinese officials offered a $1 billion loan to countries in Latin America and the Caribbean to provide any potential COVID-19 vaccine developed by a Chinese company.

The Walt Disney Company postponed the debuts of several films due to the COVID-19 pandemic. The release of the live-action version of Mulan was postponed indefinitely, and the releases of Avatar: The Way of Water and a new Star Wars film were postponed to December 2022 and December 2023 respectively.

The United States Department of Labor revealed that over 1.4 million American citizens applied for unemployment benefits in the last week, an increase on the figure reported last week, despite several weeks of decreasing numbers.

The 66th Annual Art in the Park (the major fundraiser for the Boise Art Museum, scheduled to be held in September) was cancelled as an in-person event and shifted to the virtual realm. Two major Jehovah's Witnesses conventions were also cancelled, as was the Veteran's Day Parade.

=== 24 July ===
Chilean Health Minister Enrique Paris announced an easing of coronavirus lockdown restrictions in the capital city of Santiago. Under the new restrictions, residents of the city's least densely populated suburbs will be permitted to gather in small groups and leave their homes without permission from authorities.

The Nicaraguan Government announced that citizens returning to the country will not be allowed to enter without proof of a negative coronavirus test result in the last 72 hours, which resulted in several hundred Nicaraguan travellers becoming stranded at the Costa Rica-Nicaragua border.

Mayor of Washington, D.C. Muriel Bowser announced that from 27 July, travellers arriving into Washington, D.C. for non-essential reasons from any area deemed to be a coronavirus hotspot must enter a mandatory 14-day quarantine to reduce the risk of transmission, although the neighbouring states of Maryland and Virginia were excluded from the restrictions. Despite the increasing restrictions, the US National Zoological Park in Washington, D.C. reopened with various coronavirus measures in place. Visitors must pre-book tickets, with a reduced capacity, and face masks are compulsory for both visitors and staff; social distancing measures were also introduced with some areas of the zoo implementing a one-way system.

Speaker of the United States House of Representatives Nancy Pelosi stated that she was not considering an extension to the enhanced unemployment benefits scheme, scheduled to end on 31 July.

White House Press Secretary Kayleigh McEnany stated that President Trump aims to fully reopen all American schools at the start of the academic year despite concerns from teachers and parents about a potential increase in transmission of COVID-19.

=== 25 July ===
Chilean President Sebastián Piñera signed a law allowing citizens to withdraw up to ten per cent of their pension savings to reduce the economic consequences of the pandemic, thus bringing the law into effect.

The Supreme Court of the United States voted to maintain legislation imposed by the state government of Nevada which prevented more than fifty people gathering together after a Calvary Chapel in Dayton Valley requested changes to the legislation to allow larger religious services.

=== 26 July ===
A study by the international news agency Reuters revealed for the first time that Latin America has the highest number of coronavirus cases than any other region in the world, with over 4.3 million confirmed cases.

The United States Government announced a further $470 million in funding to the biopharmaceutical company Moderna to support the company's development of a potential COVID-19 vaccine, particularly involving the third phase of clinical trials.

=== 27 July ===
President of Guatemala Alejandro Giammattei urged the country's population to remain vigilant as several coronavirus restrictions were lifted: shopping centres and restaurants reopened, and public transport was also permitted to resume, although the night-time curfew and border closures remain in place.

Majority leader of the United States Senate Mitch McConnell revealed further details about a coronavirus economic relief programme proposed by the Republican Party. Under the scheme, each American citizen will be entitled to $1,200, schools will receive over $100 billion in funding, more money will be injected into small businesses struggling with the financial consequences of the pandemic, $16 billion in funding was allocated to improve individual states' capacity to test for COVID-19, and over $25 billion in funding will be provided to increase production of personal protective equipment and potential COVID-19 vaccines in the US.

Organisers of Major League Baseball postponed two games scheduled to be held in Miami and Philadelphia due to concerns over the coronavirus after several Miami Marlins players tested positive for COVID-19.

CEO of Google Sundar Pichai announced that the company's employees will be encouraged to remote work until July 2021 due to surging cases worldwide.

American biopharmaceutical company Moderna and the National Institutes of Health announced that the potential COVID-19 vaccine being developed by the two organisations and supported by the US government has moved into the late stage of human trials, involving 30,000 volunteers at nearly 90 different sites; half of the volunteers will receive small doses of the vaccine and half will receive a placebo.

=== 28 July ===
Health authorities in Ecuador opened several mobile coronavirus testing centres in schools, sports stadiums and entertainment venues in the capital Quito after the government declared a "critical situation" in the city after intensive care units reached capacity. Health Minister Juan Carlos Zevallos also announced that medical staff will be patrolling the worst-affected neighbourhoods to carry out spot tests.

Governor of Georgia Brian Kemp withdrew his court request to prevent authorities in the state mandating the wearing of face masks in public, after previously attempting to sue the mayor of Atlanta Keisha Lance Bottoms over the decision.

Organisers of Major League Baseball postponed all games due to be played by the Miami Marlins up to and including 2 August after seventeen of the team's players and staff tested positive for COVID-19. The MLB game between the Philadelphia Phillies and New York Yankees was also postponed after some members of the Phillies were awaiting COVID-19 test results after playing against the Marlins at the weekend.

=== 29 July ===
Speaker of the United States House of Representatives Nancy Pelosi announced that all representatives and visitors will be required to wear face masks in the House of Representatives to prevent transmission of coronavirus after Republican Representative Louie Gohmert tested positive for COVID-19, although members will be permitted to remove their mask when addressing the house.

Miami-Dade County Public Schools announced that schools will not reopen physically after the summer break due to the COVID-19 pandemic in the US, with schools instructed to hold virtual classes from 31 August.

The Academy of Television Arts & Sciences announced that the upcoming 72nd Primetime Emmy Awards will be held virtually across the United States. It is normally held on its usual venue at Microsoft Theater in Los Angeles.

The World Bank announced $4 billion in funding to increase the production and distribution of healthcare equipment, including personal protective equipment, ventilators and coronavirus testing kits, to assist developing countries in fighting the pandemic.

=== 30 July ===
Brazilian Science and Technology Minister Marcos Pontes announced that he will be working remotely and self-isolating after testing positive for COVID-19, becoming the fifth minister of Jair Bolsonaro's government to do so.

Paraguay's Health Minister Julio Mazzoleni announced that a planned lockdown in the country's second-largest city of Ciudad del Este will be eased following violent protests. It was revealed that some non-essential businesses will be allowed to operate during the day, however, bars and gyms must still close, with all large social gatherings strictly prohibited.

Mayor of the District of Columbia Muriel Bowser announced that schools in Washington, D.C. will not reopen as planned after the summer break due to the escalating coronavirus situation in the US and concerns from parents and teachers over the safety of reopening schools, with schools expected to organise virtual learning for students.

Governor of Wisconsin Tony Evers declared a public health emergency and announced that face masks will be mandatory in all indoor areas due to surging coronavirus cases in the state.

=== 31 July ===
President of Argentina Alberto Fernández announced that further easing of coronavirus lockdown restrictions in the country would be postponed to at least 16 August due to increasing numbers of cases and concerns of healthcare facilities becoming overwhelmed.

The US Government announced that it will pay over $2 billion to the European pharmaceutical companies GlaxoSmithKline and Sanofi to secure potential COVID-19 vaccines for 50 million Americans. The deal amounts to a total of 100 million doses, two for each patient, with the possibility of purchasing a further 500 million at a later stage, pending the results of clinical trials at the end of the year.

== Reactions and measures in the Eastern Mediterranean ==
=== 1 July ===
The national carrier of Egypt EgyptAir resumed operations from Cairo International Airport, with airports reopening to international tourists across the country. Museums and landmarks including the Giza pyramid complex also reopened.

Israel's national airline El Al revealed that the company had a steep decline in revenue in the first quarter, forcing it to reduce the workforce and fleet of aircraft. Bosses are reportedly requesting state-backed loans to ensure the company's survival.

Beirut-Rafic Hariri International Airport in the Lebanese capital of Beirut reopened at 10% capacity to encourage tourism in the country after the COVID-19 pandemic.

The Palestinian National Authority announced that a five-day lockdown will be imposed in the West Bank after an increase in coronavirus cases.

The Qatari government began a partial reopening of restaurants, beaches, parks and places of worship.

Authorities in the United Arab Emirates stated that residents cannot travel abroad for non-essential purposes yet, and that all foreign travel still requires a permit.

=== 2 July ===
King Salman of Saudi Arabia extended various government schemes to support private sector businesses and investors through the economic consequences of the COVID-19 pandemic.

The national airline of the United Arab Emirates Emirates revealed that almost 650,000 refunds had been processed during the COVID-19 pandemic, resulting in losses of over $500 million, with the company expecting a further 500,000 refunds to be processed in the next two months.

=== 4 July ===
President of Iran Hassan Rouhani stated that people caught not wearing a face mask in public will be denied access to state services, and that employers who fail to follow government guidelines regarding the safety of their workplaces could have their business closed for a week.

Authorities in Jordan began issuing all arriving travellers with electronic wristbands to enforce the country's coronavirus quarantine rules. All arriving travellers must self-isolate for 14 days at a hotel on the Dead Sea, followed by a further 14-day quarantine at home.

Data from the Central Bank of Tunisia shows that revenue from the country's tourism industry decreased by 47 per cent in the first half of the year, as a direct consequence of the COVID-19 pandemic.

=== 5 July ===
President of the State of Palestine Mahmoud Abbas declared a state of emergency across Palestine for thirty days, with residents only permitted to leave their homes for essential reasons.

Non-essential American diplomats have been leaving Saudi Arabia due to the surging coronavirus cases in the country.

=== 6 July ===
Health authorities in Saudi Arabia announced rules for this year's Hajj pilgrimage to attempt to prevent transmission of COVID-19. Restrictions include the mandatory wearing of face masks, strict social distancing between all pilgrims during prayers, reduced capacity on public transport, measures to prevent pilgrims from touching the Kaaba, restaurants selling pre-packaged food and drink, compulsory coronavirus tests, and only pilgrims living in Saudi Arabia permitted to travel to Mecca.

=== 7 July ===
The Palestinian National Authority extended the coronavirus lockdown in the West Bank for a further five days due to rising numbers of cases.

In the United Arab Emirates, Dubai reopened borders to international tourists, with mandatory coronavirus tests on arrival for travellers without proof of a negative test result.

=== 9 July ===
Emirates, the national airline of the United Arab Emirates, announced a further loss of thousands of jobs, including pilots and cabin crew, due to the economic consequences of the COVID-19 pandemic.

=== 10 July ===
Kuwait's Ministry of Health advised the country's citizens against foreign travel due to the COVID-19 pandemic, and the increased spread of the virus in spite of the various measures implemented by foreign governments.

=== 11 July ===
President of Iran Hassan Rouhani stated that all weddings should be cancelled due to the risk of coronavirus transmission, prompting authorities in the capital city of Tehran to close all wedding and funeral venues. Rouhani also stated that Iran cannot close its economy again, largely as a result of international sanctions.

Crown Prince of Dubai Hamdan bin Mohammed Al Maktoum announced a 1.5 billion dirham economic stimulus package to aid Dubai's financial recovery from the COVID-19 pandemic.

A report revealed that the national airline of the United Arab Emirates, Emirates has reduced its workforce by 10 per cent during the COVID-19 pandemic, with the loss of over 9,000 jobs, after the company temporarily suspended all operations due to public health concerns.

=== 12 July ===
King Abdullah II of Jordan announced that Jordan has brought the COVID-19 pandemic under control, and can now prioritise the reopening of the country's economy after unemployment rose to over 19 per cent in the first quarter of the year.

The Palestinian National Authority announced that a night-time curfew will be imposed in the West Bank due to rising coronavirus cases. The cities of Bethlehem, Hebron, Nablus and Ramallah have suspended all travel for four days, with travel between provinces strictly prohibited for two weeks.

The Abu Dhabi Fund for Development in the United Arab Emirates suspended debt service repayments for several countries and companies due to the economic consequences of the COVID-19 pandemic.

=== 13 July ===
The International Monetary Fund warned that the Middle East and North Africa region could face a steeper recession than previously predicted as a result of the pandemic.

Tunisian Investment Minister Slim Azzabi revealed that the country's economy is predicted to contract by 6.5% in 2020 as a direct result of the COVID-19 pandemic.

=== 14 July ===
Authorities in Oman announced that citizens will soon be able to travel abroad, although no date was specified. International travel will require citizens to register with authorities and undergo a mandatory quarantine on return; it was also revealed that the lockdowns in Dhofar Governorate and on Masirah Island will be maintained due to high numbers of coronavirus cases.

Authorities in territory controlled by Houthi rebels in Yemen announced an easing of coronavirus lockdown restrictions, allowing the reopening of restaurants, parks and wedding venues, whilst encouraging the public to maintain a social distance and use hand sanitiser regularly.

=== 16 July ===
A spokesperson for the Jordanian Government Amjad Adaileh announced that commercial flights from Queen Alia International Airport will resume from August to countries on an internationally agreed safe travel list.

Authorities in the United Arab Emirates announced that trials of a potential COVID-19 vaccine being developed jointly by the China National Pharmaceutical Group, the UAE's Ministry of Health and the private company G42 Healthcare had entered the third phase, involving 15,000 volunteers, the first such trials to be carried out worldwide.

=== 17 July ===
Commercial flights between Iran and the United Arab Emirates resumed after an Emirates plane flew from Dubai to Tehran.

=== 18 July ===
The leaders of the G20 took part in a virtual meeting hosted by the Saudi capital of Riyadh to discuss the recovery of the global economy. The G20 had previously announced a one-year debt freeze for poorer countries, although World Bank President David Malpass recommended that the scheme be extended to 2022. The G20 leaders concluded the meeting by stating that a possible extension to the debt suspension scheme would be discussed further at the 2020 G20 Riyadh summit.

=== 19 July ===
Iran's Civil Aviation Organisation announced that Turkish authorities suspended flights to and from the country due to new outbreaks of coronavirus in Iran.

The Iranian Health Ministry confirmed the country's number of cases to be significantly lower than the 25 million previously suggested by President Hassan Rouhani.

=== 20 July ===
Authorities in Saudi Arabia announced that the annual Hajj pilgrimage to Mecca will begin on 29 July, with social distancing guidelines in place and a heavily reduced capacity.

=== 21 July ===
Authorities in Oman announced that, from 25 July to 8 August, all travel between the country's provinces will be suspended and a night-time curfew will be imposed, during which all public spaces must close, in order to prevent the transmission of coronavirus.

=== 22 July ===
The Egyptian government extended the permitted operating hours for restaurants to midnight, and also increased the permitted capacity to 50 per cent. The operating hours for shops were extended to 10pm; both pieces of legislation will come into effect from 26 July.

The Qatari government announced that the country's borders will reopen to international travellers from 1 August as part of a further easing of coronavirus lockdown restrictions. All arriving travellers from a list of 40 countries deemed to be low-risk will be required to take a COVID-19 test at the airport and undergo a mandatory quarantine for a week whilst awaiting the result; anybody testing positive will be transferred to a secure government facility to self-isolate.

=== 23 July ===
The Kuwaiti government announced that the country's curfew will be adjusted to be in place from 9pm to 3am and will be reviewed after the Eid al-Adha festival; it was also announced that the third phase of reopening after the pandemic will begin on 28 July. Under the new restrictions, hotels and places of worship will be permitted to reopen and taxi drivers will also be allowed to resume operations.

Newly released data from the World Health Organization highlighted that the countries of Qatar and Bahrain have the highest per capita rates of coronavirus infection anywhere in the world.

=== 25 July ===
Iranian President Hassan Rouhani urged the public to follow social distancing measures in order to prevent a second spike of infections in the country during the Islamic festival of Eid al-Adha, which begins at the end of July.

Authorities in Kuwait announced that the coronavirus lockdown imposed in Farwaniya Governorate will be lifted on 26 July.

=== 27 July ===
Authorities in Lebanon re-imposed several coronavirus restrictions for a fortnight in response to a recent surge in infections in the country. Under the new restrictions, non-essential businesses including cinemas, places of worship, bars, markets and sporting venues were ordered to close, with shops, schools and banks only permitted to open on Tuesdays and Wednesdays, although the country's main airport, ports, border crossings and businesses deemed to be essential (largely medical, agricultural, industrial and governmental organisations) can remain open. All arriving international travellers will be required to enter a mandatory 48-hour quarantine to receive the results of a COVID-19 test.

=== 30 July ===
The internationally recognised Libyan government announced that a full lockdown of its territory will be imposed from 4 August following a surge in coronavirus infections and last for a minimum of five days, with people only allowed to leave their homes for strictly essential reasons.

In the Saudi Arabian holy city of Mecca, a limited number of Islamic pilgrims participated in prayers on Mount Ararat on the peak day of the Hajj pilgrimage, to enable coronavirus measures. All pilgrims were required to undergo mandatory COVID-19 tests and enter a period of self-isolation prior to the pilgrimage, and must travel in groups of no more than twenty, with strict social distancing measures in place throughout.

== Reactions and measures in Europe ==
=== 1 July ===
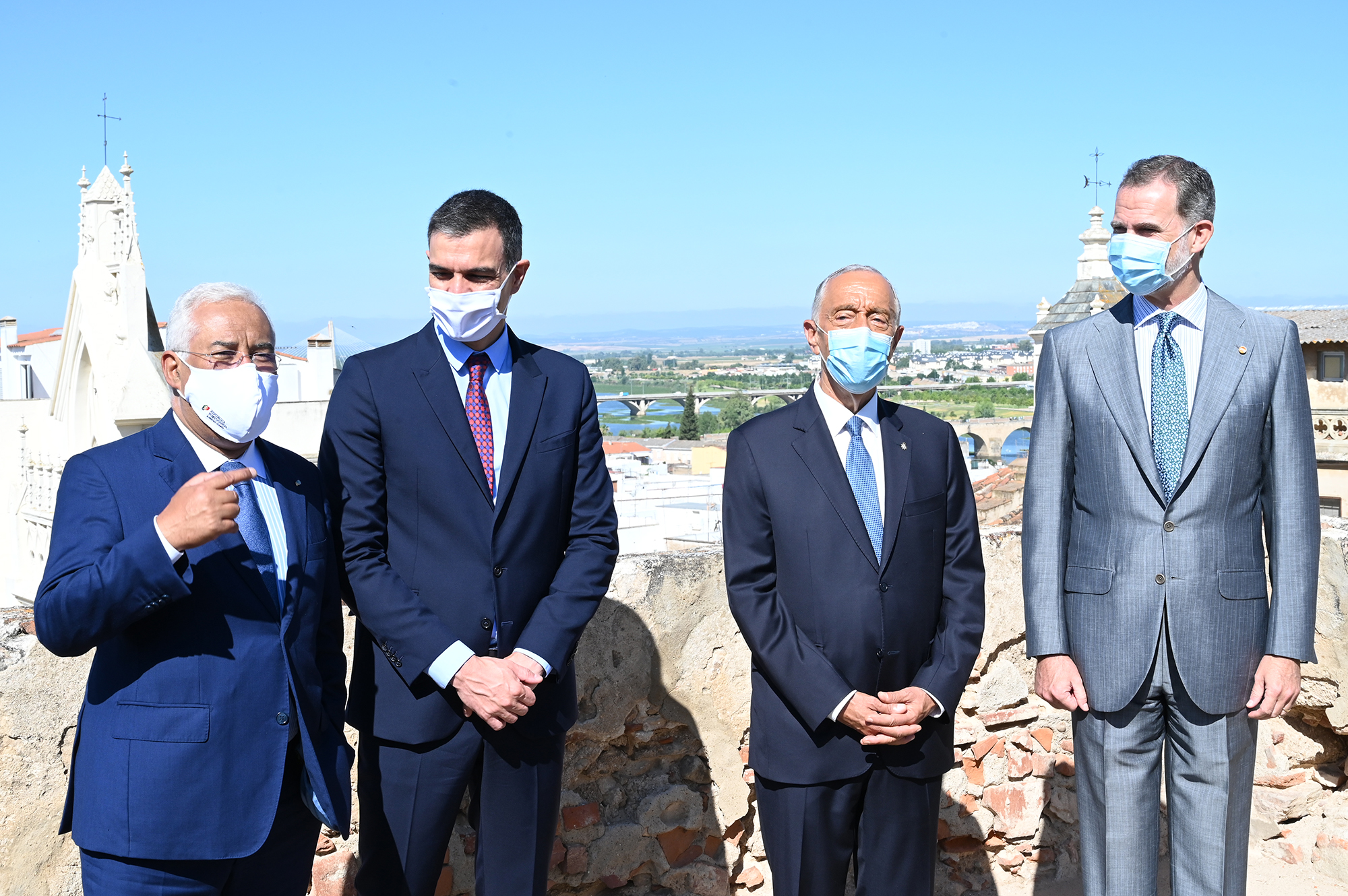
Portuguese and Spanish premiers António Costa and Pedro Sánchez, alongside Portuguese President Marcelo Rebelo de Sousa and King Felipe VI of Spain during the ceremony of the reopening of the Portugal-Spain border, on 1 July 2020

Austrian Foreign Affairs Minister Alexander Schallenberg warned citizens not to travel to six countries in the Balkans that are not part of the European Union. The six countries were later revealed to be Albania, Bosnia & Herzegovina, Kosovo, Montenegro, North Macedonia and Serbia.

Belgium moved into phase 4 of the country's plan to ease coronavirus lockdown restrictions, with cinemas, casinos and concert halls reopening and 'social bubble' sizes expanding from ten to fifteen people.

The European Union reopened borders to travellers from fifteen countries deemed to be low-risk for coronavirus transmission.

European airline manufacturing company Airbus announced it would be cutting 15,000 jobs due to the impact of the COVID-19 pandemic on aviation, with most jobs being lost in the UK, Germany and Spain.

Greek authorities reopened the country's borders to international travellers from some countries, with airports and ports reopening across the country.

The border between Portugal and Spain was officially reopened by President of Portugal Marcelo Rebelo de Sousa and King Felipe VI of Spain after being closed for more than three months to prevent the spread of coronavirus between the two countries.

The Swiss Federal Councillor for Home Affairs Alain Berset announced that a 10-day mandatory quarantine will be enforced on all travellers arriving from countries deemed to be high-risk from 6 July, in line with measures introduced by the European Union.

=== 2 July ===
Hungarian Prime Minister Viktor Orbán announced that countries outside of the European Union, with the exception of Serbia, will not be added to the government's list of safe countries.

President of Kazakhstan Kassym-Jomart Tokayev introduced a second coronavirus lockdown in the country from 5 July after a rise in infections. Under the new restrictions, non-essential businesses have been forced to close and travel between provinces has been limited, although restaurants will be able to remain open for outdoor dining and people will be allowed to leave their homes.

Spanish Prime Minister Pedro Sánchez pledged 9 billion euros of emergency funding for the autonomous communities of Spain to improve the country's regional health services, and suggested possible tax rises to strengthen the country's economy.

Authorities in Switzerland revealed that travellers from 29 countries, including the US, Brazil and Sweden, will have to enter a mandatory 14-day quarantine upon arrival in the country from 6 July to prevent the spread of coronavirus.

British Secretary of State for Education Gavin Williamson revealed the British government's plans to reopen schools at full capacity in September. It was announced that children will only be able to mix with their own year group with no large events and regular hand-washing. Williamson further stated that staff and students were not expected to wear face masks and that parents would be fined for refusing to send their child to school; pupils showing any symptoms of COVID-19 must not go to school and schools reporting any cases would have to be closed.

British Prime Minister Boris Johnson announced an easing of the country's mandatory 14-day quarantine for anybody arriving from abroad. Countries will be placed in a traffic-light system, whereby travellers from countries in the green and orange "low-risk" categories will not have to self-isolate when arriving in the UK.

First Minister of Scotland Nicola Sturgeon announced that it will be mandatory to wear face masks in shops from 10 July and that children from different households would no longer need to maintain a social distance when outside.

=== 3 July ===
The European Commissioner for Health and Food Safety Stella Kyriakidou announced that the European Commission has approved the use of remdesivir to treat severe cases of coronavirus, the first such drug approved by the European Union.

In France, the Cour de Justice de la République, a court specialising in government misconduct, announced that an inquiry into the actions of several government ministers' handling of the COVID-19 pandemic will be opened, including former Prime Minister of France Edouard Philippe, former Health Minister Agnès Buzyn and current Health Minister Olivier Véran. The court revealed that all three were accused of "failing to fight a disaster".

French national airline Air France revealed plans to cut over 7,500 jobs after reportedly losing 15 million euros a day.

The Akim of East Kazakhstan Region Daniyal Akhmetov will impose a full lockdown on the cities of Oskemen and Semey from 5 July due to rising coronavirus cases.

The Portuguese Ministry of Planning and Infrastructure revealed that the Portuguese government had reached an agreement with shareholders in Portugal's national airline TAP Air to take a controlling stake, in an attempt to prevent to the company collapsing due to the economic consequences of the pandemic.

Serbian President Aleksandar Vučić announced that a state of emergency will be reimposed in the capital city of Belgrade after a surge in coronavirus cases. Under the new restrictions, it will be mandatory to wear face masks in public and there will be a limit on the size of both indoor and outdoor gatherings.

The British Government announced that travellers arriving from several countries and territories will not be required to self-isolate for 14 days including Ireland, the Channel Islands, the Isle of Man, several European Union countries, Turkey, all British Overseas Territories, Australia, New Zealand, Fiji, Vietnam, South Korea, French Polynesia, and New Caledonia. It was also revealed that the British government were discussing the possibility of joining the EU's plan to secure supplies of a potential coronavirus vaccine.

=== 4 July ===
The World Health Organization announced that it would be stopping trials of the antimalarial drug hydroxychloroquine to treat COVID-19 after they failed to reduce the mortality rate amongst hospitalised patients.

Director of the Louvre museum in Paris Jean-Luc Martinez announced that the popular tourist attraction would reopen to the public from 6 July with strict social distancing rules in place and some areas of the museum remaining closed to visitors. All visitors will be required to book tickets in advance and wear a face mask.

Greek health authorities announced an extension to coronavirus lockdowns in the country's migrant camps due to concerns over the spread of the virus, despite some international criticism that the government has extended the restrictions to limit the movement of migrants.

Catalan Health Minister Alba Vergés announced that a local coronavirus lockdown will be enforced in the province of Lleida affecting 200,000 people due to an outbreak of COVID-19 cases. Under the new restrictions, movement in and out of the area will be heavily restricted by police checkpoints. The capital of the autonomous community of Catalonia, Barcelona, reopened the Sagrada Familia to essential workers and their families as part of an easing of lockdown restrictions there.

In England, non-essential businesses including pubs, cinemas, hairdressers, places of worship and tourist attractions reopened to the public. Some controversy was generated over the British Government's decision to reopen pubs on a Saturday, with the day being referred to by the media as 'Super Saturday', sparking concerns over potential violence and breaches of restrictions.

=== 5 July ===
Authorities in Greece announced that the country's border will be closed to Serbian travellers until 15 July after the country declared a state of emergency on 3 July in response to rising coronavirus cases.

Irish Transport Minister Eamon Ryan stated that the country will ease foreign travel restrictions from 20 July. Similar to measures adopted by the United Kingdom, travellers arriving from countries deemed to be low-risk will be exempt from quarantining for 14 days upon arrival.

The Government of Kazakhstan announced a further tightening of lockdown restrictions in the country due to a surge in cases. Under the new restrictions, malls, salons and leisure facilities have been ordered to close for two weeks.

The British Government revealed an investment of over £1.5 billion to support the country's arts industry, with emergency grants available for theatres, museums, galleries and cinemas.

=== 6 July ===
The Louvre museum in Paris reopened to the public with a reduced capacity and strict social distancing rules.

Flights between Greece and the UK were revealed to be resuming from 15 July.

Israeli Prime Minister Benjamin Netanyahu announced that bars, gyms and events venues will be forced to close with immediate effect as a result of a surge in cases in the country. The Bank of Israel also predicted a six per cent contraction of the country's GDP.

British sandwich company Pret A Manger announced that a total of thirty stores across the country will close due to the COVID-19 pandemic, with more than 1,000 jobs expected to be lost. It was revealed that the company had sales 74 per cent lower than in the same period last year, with monthly losses of as much as £20 million.

=== 7 July ===
The Armenian Deputy Minister of Sport Artur Martirosyan announced that Armenian athletes will not participate at the Commonwealth of Independent States Games in Kazan in September due to public health concerns.

The German state of Saxony revealed that events with more than 1,000 attendees will be permitted to resume from 1 September.

Italian Minister of Health Roberto Speranza announced that flights between Italy and Bangladesh will be suspended for a week after several passengers tested positive for coronavirus on a flight from Dhaka to Rome on 6 July.

Portuguese Prime Minister António Costa revealed that the Portuguese Government are discussing the possibility of a travel corridor to the UK with the British Government after Portugal was initially excluded from the UK's list of safe countries.

Serbian President Aleksandar Vučić imposed a nationwide curfew from 10 to 13 July due to the rise in coronavirus cases in the country, with Vučić stating that most hospitals in Belgrade were close to capacity, and therefore social gatherings will be reduced to five people both indoors and outdoors from 8 July.

Spanish Transport Minister José Luis Ábalos stated that 1.8 billion euros of financial aid will be provided to transport companies in Spain. It was revealed that the state-owned rail company Renfe Operadora will receive 1 billion euros of the sum, with the remaining to be provided to private companies.

=== 8 July ===
The Austrian Government issued travel warnings for the Eastern European countries of Bulgaria, Romania and Moldova due to the rising numbers of cases there, as well as imported cases being recorded in Austria from those countries. Under the new guidance, all arriving travellers from the listed countries will be required to show documentation of a negative COVID-19 test result or undergo a 14-day quarantine.

The German pharmaceutical company Merck revealed that it had reached an agreement with the European Union to supply the company's potential COVID-19 vaccine upon request to member states of the EU.

President of the Government of Catalonia Quim Torra announced that it will be mandatory to wear a face mask anywhere in Catalonia from 10 July, with fines of up to 100 euros if caught without a mask.

The British Royal Collection Trust announced that some of the residences of Queen Elizabeth II will reopen from 23 July with strict social distancing and hygiene measures in place, as well as the requirement to prebook tickets. The residences named as reopening were Windsor Castle, the Royal Mews and Queen's Gallery of Buckingham Palace, and Holyrood Palace.

British Chancellor of the Exchequer Rishi Sunak unveiled the British government's plans to mitigate the economic consequences of the COVID-19 pandemic. It was announced that a VAT cut would be provided for the hospitality industry, a stamp duty holiday, and an 'eat out to help out' discount on a selected number of restaurants, whereby diners can receive fifty per cent off of their meal up to £10 per person from Monday-Wednesday. Sunak also announced that £2 billion will be spent on helping 16-25 year-olds to find employment, with businesses scheduled to receive £1,000 for each employee brought off of the furlough scheme. The Treasury also revealed a £3 billion green recovery plan to create jobs and encourage businesses to become more environmentally-friendly.

=== 9 July ===
The World Health Organization announced that an independent inquiry will be launched into the organisation's handling of the COVID-19 pandemic following strong criticism, and eventual withdrawal, from the United States. Director-General Tedros Adhanom that former Prime Minister of New Zealand Helen Clark and former President of Liberia Ellen Johnson Sirleaf would chair the panel.

Italian Minister of Health Roberto Speranza announced that Italian borders will be closed to travellers from a list of countries deemed to have unsafe levels of coronavirus transmission. The countries listed were Armenia, Bahrain, Bangladesh, Bosnia & Herzegovina, Brazil, Chile, Dominican Republic, Kuwait, Moldova, North Macedonia, Oman, Panama and Peru.

Serbian Prime Minister Ana Brnabić announced that a previously planned weekend curfew would not be enforced as a result of anti-lockdown protests in the capital city of Belgrade; instead, indoor gatherings will be limited to ten individuals and working hours at restaurants will be reduced.

President of the Balearic Islands Francina Armengol confirmed that it will be mandatory to wear a face covering in all public spaces from 13 July, with the only exemptions being for children under six, with fines of up to 100 euros if caught without a mask.

British Secretary of State for Digital, Culture, Media and Sport Oliver Dowden announced that certain leisure and beauty businesses will be permitted to reopen later in the month. Outdoor swimming pools will be permitted to reopen on 11 July, with indoor sports facilities and gyms reopening later on 25 July. It was also confirmed that beauty businesses including tattoo parlours, spas and tanning salons can largely reopen from 13 July, although face treatments will be excluded due to a higher risk of transmission.

=== 10 July ===
European Council President Charles Michel revealed the European Union's plans to aid economic recovery from the COVID-19 pandemic. He proposed a 750 billion euro recovery fund, although did not state whether the fund would take the form of grants or loans, although Finnish Prime Minister Sanna Marin and Swedish Minister for EU Affairs Hans Dahlgren expressed concerns over the potential fund.

President of Kazakhstan Kassym-Jomart Tokayev warned that the cabinet may be sacked if the coronavirus situation does not improve in the country by the end of the second nationwide lockdown, imposed on 5 July.

The Norwegian Government announced that some travel restrictions will be lifted from 15 July, with travel permitted to resume to most countries in the Schengen area (although only some provinces of Sweden are included) and the UK; it was confirmed that the list of safe countries will be reviewed every two weeks.

Deputy Prime Minister of Russia Tatyana Golikova stated that Russia could begin lifting restrictions on international air travel from 15 July, two weeks earlier than the scheduled date of 1 August. Flights will only be permitted to countries where cases do not exceed 40 per 100,000 people, where the rate of transmission is less than one, and where the average daily increase in cases over the last 14 days is lower than one per cent.

New quarantine measures came into place in England, allowing travellers arriving from a list of 75 countries and all overseas British territories deemed to have low risk of coronavirus transmission to enter without having to undergo an otherwise mandatory 14-day quarantine, in an attempt to boost income for the struggling aviation and hospitality sectors, although the government advised citizens against cruise holidays. Similar measures were implemented in Northern Ireland, with an almost identical list of safe countries. British Prime Minister Boris Johnson also announced that tighter restrictions on the use of face masks may be needed after they were made mandatory in shops in Scotland.

From today, Northern Ireland allowed businesses including gyms, playgrounds, cinemas and arcades to reopen with strict social distancing and hygiene measures in place. Authorities also introduced legislation requiring people to wear face masks on public transport, with the only exemptions being for people with medical conditions, children under thirteen, and on school transport.

=== 11 July ===
The Bulgarian Football Union announced that the start of the First Professional Football League's season will be postponed by two weeks due to public health concerns relating to coronavirus, with a new start date of 7 August.

Researchers at Germany's University of Tübingen announced that 4,000 volunteers have registered to take part in clinical trials for a potential COVID-19 vaccine, which began in June.

Swiss football club FC Zürich announced that the team's next two games have been cancelled after they were placed into quarantine until 17 July due to multiple cases of COVID-19 being reported amongst the team's players and staff, including defender Mirlind Kryeziu.

=== 12 July ===
Hungarian authorities announced that border restrictions will be tightened from 15 July due to rising coronavirus cases in various parts of the world. Under the new restrictions, countries with higher rates of transmission will be divided into "yellow" and "red" categories, with travellers arriving from "yellow" countries being required to undergo a mandatory 14-day quarantine, with borders closed to travellers from "red" countries; Hungarian citizens returning from "red" countries must enter a quarantine and produce two negative test results before being permitted to leave.

Prime Minister of Israel Benjamin Netanyahu announced that immediate financial aid will be provided to citizens affected by the COVID-19 pandemic, including disbursements of up to 7,500 shekels to the self-employed in response to growing criticism of the Israeli Government's handling of the pandemic.

Health officials in the Spanish regions of Galicia and the Basque Country introduced strict safety measures to allow voting in the 2020 Galician regional election and 2020 Basque regional election to go ahead. Voters were required to wear face masks and adhere to a strict 1.5 metre social distance.

In the United Kingdom, 200 employees at a farm in Herefordshire were forced to self-isolate after 73 individuals tested positive for COVID-19.

=== 13 July ===
Irish Minister for Tourism, Culture, Arts, Gaeltacht, Sport and Media Catherine Martin stated that authorities were considering introducing tighter measures on arriving international travellers after criticism from opposition politicians, including the possibility of making it mandatory to undergo a 14-day quarantine, which is currently only recommended.

President of Kazakhstan Kassym-Jomart Tokayev announced that the country's coronavirus lockdown will be extended by a further two weeks until the end of July, and that struggling families will be able to access financial aid from the government.

A local court in the Spanish Province of Lleida in Catalonia suspended the stay-at-home order imposed on the province by health officials despite rising coronavirus cases.

British Prime Minister Boris Johnson announced that face coverings will be compulsory in all shops and supermarkets in England from 24 July, with fines of up to £100 for those who do not comply with the new rules, although children under 11 and those with certain medical conditions will be exempt.

=== 14 July ===
French President Emmanuel Macron announced that face masks will be mandatory in all indoor areas from 1 August.

Head of the German Chancellery and coordinator of the German government's response to the COVID-19 pandemic Helge Braun announced that authorities are considering introducing local travel bans to prevent a second wave of coronavirus infections, and that social distancing and the wearing of face masks in public will likely remain in place for the next few months.

Hungarian Prime Minister Viktor Orbán announced that he will veto the pandemic recovery fund proposed by the European Union if poorer countries receive less funding or conditions such as migration policy conformity are imposed.

Italian Minister of Health Roberto Speranza revealed that restrictive measures will remain in place until August to avoid a possible second wave of coronavirus infections, and that the mandatory 14-day quarantine for all travellers arriving in Italy from outside the European Union will be maintained.

Health authorities in the Spanish autonomous community of Catalonia re-imposed a stay-at-home order in the city of Lleida and several surrounding towns for 15 days after a surge in coronavirus infections, although must be improved by a judge to come into effect. Under the new restrictions, residents will only be permitted to leave their homes for essential reasons and non-essential businesses will be forced to close, with social gatherings of more than ten people also prohibited.

Organisers of the 2020 Swiss Indoors tennis tournament cancelled the event due to concerns over coronavirus.

The national rail operator of Turkmenistan Türkmendemirýollary announced that all trains will be halted for a week from 16 to 23 July after some media outlets reported that the first coronavirus cases had been identified in the country.

=== 15 July ===
Austria's Federal Ministry for European and International Affairs lifted warnings currently advising against non-essential travel to the Italian region of Lombardy after a decline in the number of coronavirus cases.

The postponed 2020 North Macedonian parliamentary election was held with several coronavirus measures implemented, including strict social distancing rules and the mandatory wearing of face masks.

Authorities on the Spanish island of Mallorca announced that bars and nightclubs popular with foreign tourists in Magaluf and Las Palmas must close to prevent large gatherings of people behaving in a disorderly manner.

British Prime Minister Boris Johnson announced that an independent inquiry into the government's handling of the COVID-19 pandemic will be held to attempt to prevent a potentially deadlier second wave of the virus, although Johnson stated that "now is not the time" due to the current situation in the country. Health Secretary Matt Hancock also stated that face coverings will not be compulsory in offices.

=== 16 July ===
The European Union removed Montenegro and Serbia from the list of countries deemed safe to allow non-essential travel to as a result of rising coronavirus infections in the two countries, effectively re-introducing a travel ban.

Hungarian Minister of the Prime Minister's Office Gergely Gulyás announced that celebrations scheduled for Hungary's national day on 20 August have been cancelled due to concerns over potential increased coronavirus transmission.

Russian scientific researchers revealed that the country plans to produce 30 million doses of a COVID-19 vaccine domestically in 2020, with the possibility of manufacturing a further 170 million doses abroad. This attracted criticism from governments in the US, Canada and the UK, who claimed that state-sponsored Russian cyber attacks had been carried out on research institutions in their respective countries to attempt to gain information relating to coronavirus vaccine trials, although the Russian Government strongly denied the allegations.

British Health Secretary Matt Hancock announced an easing of coronavirus lockdown restrictions in the city of Leicester due to a decrease in cases. Under the new restrictions, non-essential retail outlets, schools and nurseries will be permitted to reopen from 24 July, although bars and restaurants will remain closed; the ban on social gatherings of more than six people was also maintained, as well as bans on non-essential travel.

=== 17 July ===
Austrian Chancellor Sebastian Kurz announced that his government rejected the economic recovery programme proposed by the European Union, arguing that there should not be a long-term debt union.

Leaders from the 27 member states of the European Union met in Brussels to discuss the proposed coronavirus economic recovery programme, which aims to disburse 750 billion euros as part of a long-term recovery plan, with all payments expected to last until 2026. Czech Prime Minister Andrej Babiš later stated, however, that the EU was no closer to reaching an agreement, and that views on the proposal were widely varied.

Authorities in Israel imposed a weekend lockdown from 17 to 19 July, with non-essential shops, zoos, museums and leisure facilities all instructed to close, although the government reiterated that it was not a stay-at-home order. Russian pharmaceutical company R-Pharm revealed that it has reached an agreement with AstraZeneca and the University of Oxford to manufacture the potential COVID-19 vaccine being developed by the two companies.

Catalan Health Minister Alba Vergés urged four million residents of the Barcelona metropolitan area to stay at home as a result of a rise in coronavirus cases. All non-essential travel was advised against, with entertainment venues including cinemas and theatres being forced to close, restaurants operating at a significantly reduced capacity, and the social gathering limit being reduced to ten people.

British Prime Minister Boris Johnson announced that fans could possibly return to sports stadiums by October, with a number of pilot schemes scheduled to take place from the end of July; these pilot schemes were later revealed to be held at two country cricket matches from 26 to 27 July, the 2020 World Snooker Championship from 31 July to 16 August, and the Goodwood horse racing festival on 1 August. All stadiums will be expected to follow strict hygiene measures, including providing hand sanitising stations and implementing social distancing. Johnson also revealed an additional £3 billion in funding to the National Health Service to prepare for a possible second wave of coronavirus infections, with testing capacity scheduled to be increased to 500,000 a day by the end of October.

The national airline of the United Kingdom British Airways announced that all of the company's Boeing 747 planes, equivalent to 10% of the company's entire fleet, will be retired with immediate effect due to the COVID-19 pandemic.

=== 18 July ===
Authorities in Azerbaijan announced that coronavirus lockdown restrictions will be extended to 31 August after a further surge in cases. It was stated that people in urban areas, including the capital Baku, must obtain special permission to leave their homes between 20 July and 5 August, with non-essential businesses including shopping centres, restaurants and entertainment facilities all remaining closed; beauty salons were given permission to reopen.

Leaders of member states of the European Union reconvened in Brussels to discuss the proposed 750 billion euro economic recovery plan. Officials stated that several wealthy northern countries had expressed concern over access to the recovery fund; several leaders stated that the negotiations had been challenging, with German Chancellor Angela Merkel describing them as "very, very difficult negotiations" and Polish Prime Minister Mateusz Morawiecki stating that it is "highly probable" that a deal will not be reached by Sunday.

Greek authorities extended the coronavirus lockdown in the country's migrant camps to 2 August in order to prevent further spread of the virus.

The British Government temporarily suspended daily reporting on new COVID-19 deaths after some scientists claimed that Public Health England has been over-reporting new deaths. Also in the UK, a COVID-19 antibody test developed by the University of Oxford passed the first phase of scientific trials with over 98 per cent accuracy.

=== 19 July ===
Leaders of the member states of the European Union did not reach an agreement on a proposed economic recovery grants after the third day of talks in Brussels. It was reported that the main disagreements lie with the size of the grants, with several countries, led by the Netherlands, stating that 350 billion euros should be the maximum amount, whilst others stated that 400 billion euros should be the minimum amount.

French Health Minister Olivier Véran announced that from 20 July, there will be a fine of 135 euros for people caught without a face mask in indoor public spaces.

Minister-President of the German state of Bavaria Markus Söder stated that free coronavirus tests will soon be provided for returning passengers at all airports in the state.

Health officials in the Spanish autonomous community of Catalonia strongly advised residents to stay at home in the municipalities of Figueres, Vilafant and Sant Feliu de Llobregat after a surge in coronavirus cases. Although no mandatory lockdown was imposed, new restrictions included reducing the social gathering limit to ten people, and restaurants operating at a 50 per cent capacity, with strict social distancing measures in place. Authorities in Barcelona also announced that access to the city's beaches will be limited by law enforcement officers as a result of rising cases in the city and its surrounding areas.

=== 20 July ===
Danish Business Minister Simon Kollerup stated that merchant sailors stranded at sea during the COVID-19 pandemic will be permitted to dock at Danish ports due to a sustained drop in cases in the country.

Organisers of the 2020 Ballon d'Or cancelled the award for the first time in its 64-year history due to the impact of coronavirus on the sporting industry.

A spokesperson for the Greek government announced that tighter restrictions will be introduced to control the movement of international seasonal workers, with any agricultural workers leaving the country before 4 August not able to return until further notice. It was also announced that land entry into Greece will be limited to six northern border crossings to control any possible imported cases.

Health authorities in the United Kingdom revealed that the government has purchased 90 million doses of potential COVID-19 vaccines from several pharmaceutical companies including Pfizer, Valneva SE and BioNTech. The British government has already secured 100 million doses of a potential vaccine being developed by AstraZeneca.

=== 21 July ===
Austrian Chancellor Sebastian Kurz reintroduced legislation mandating the wearing of face coverings in public spaces including supermarkets and banks as a result of a surge in coronavirus infections in the country.

President of the European Council Charles Michel announced that leaders of the European Union had reached an agreement over a coronavirus economic recovery fund dubbed Next Generation EU after four days of negotiations. Under the scheme, 750 billion euros of joint debt will be issued to assist the recovery of the economies of all member states, comprising 390 billion euros of grants and 360 billion euros of low-interest loans. A long-term recovery fund will also provide economic aid from 2021 to 2027.

Polish Education Minister Dariusz Piontkowski stated that the government is working to fully reopen schools at the start of the academic year in September, and is working on legislation to ensure the safety of students and staff.

The Russian Finance Ministry revealed plans to cut government spending by up to 10 per cent (a total of $65 billion) between 2021 and 2023 as a result of increased spending during the COVID-19 pandemic, with the Russian GDP predicted to decrease by up to 5 per cent in 2020.

Spanish Foreign Affairs Minister Arancha González Laya announced that the Spanish government will provide 1.7 billion euros in aid to developing countries to assist them in fighting the COVID-19 pandemic.

Sarah Gilbert, the lead researcher of the potential COVID-19 vaccine being developed by the University of Oxford and AstraZeneca, stated that the vaccine could possibly be available for purchase by the end of the year after the first stages of clinical trials showed that the vaccine initiated an immune response in volunteers.

=== 22 July ===
Spanish Tourism Minister Reyes Maroto stated that the France-Spain border should stay open as the recent outbreaks of coronavirus in Catalonia come under control.

Organisers of the Nobel Prizes cancelled the traditional banquet, scheduled to be held in December at Stockholm City Hall, for the first time since 1956 due to public health concerns relating to the pandemic.

Health authorities in Switzerland expanded the country's coronavirus watch list to include a total of 42 countries; travellers arriving from these countries are required to undergo a mandatory 14-day quarantine upon entry to Switzerland, or receive a fine of 10,000 Swiss francs. The new additions to the list included Bosnia & Herzegovina, Costa Rica, Ecuador, El Salvador, eSwatini, Guatemala, Kazakhstan, Kyrgyzstan, Luxembourg, the Maldives, Mexico, Montenegro, Suriname and the United Arab Emirates. Sweden and Belarus were removed from the list.

President of Ukraine Volodymyr Zelenskyy announced that tourists arriving in the country from Australia, New Zealand and several Arab states will no longer require a visa, in an attempt to increase tourism after the COVID-19 pandemic.

=== 23 July ===
Israeli Prime Minister Benjamin Netanyahu appointed Ronni Gamzu, the director of the Tel Aviv Sourasky Medical Center, as the country's National Coronavirus Project Manager; Gamzu will be responsible for coordinating the Israeli government's response to the pandemic: Israel Shield.

The Dutch Museum Association urged Prime Minister Mark Rutte to provide the country's arts industry with vital economic support as a result of months of closures during the COVID-19 pandemic, with a large number of smaller businesses warning that they could potentially go bankrupt without further support from the Dutch government.

Statistics Sweden revealed that Sweden's unemployment rate reached 9.4 per cent in June as a direct result of the COVID-19 pandemic, the highest level of unemployment recorded in the country since 1998. 557,000 people were recorded as being unemployed, 150,000 higher than at the same time in 2019.

=== 24 July ===
Bulgarian Prime Minister Boyko Borisov entered a period of self-isolation after a senior government official tested positive for COVID-19.

French Prime Minister Jean Castex advised French citizens not to travel to the Spanish autonomous community of Catalonia after a surge of cases in the region, and also announced that there will be increased controls at French borders with travellers arriving from some countries having to undergo mandatory COVID-19 tests.

German Health Minister Jens Spahn announced that travellers arriving from countries deemed to have high rates of coronavirus transmission may be required to take a mandatory COVID-19 test at the airport or undergo a 14-day quarantine.

Italian Health Minister Roberto Speranza announced that any travellers arriving in Italy from Bulgaria and Romania would be required to enter a mandatory quarantine to prevent the importation of any COVID-19 cases.

Norwegian health authorities announced that any travellers arriving in the country from Spain will be required to enter a mandatory 10-day quarantine as a result of surging cases there. It was also announced that free travel will resume between Norway and the Swedish regions of Kalmar, Örebro, Östergötland and Värmland.

=== 25 July ===
Spanish Minister for Foreign Affairs Arancha González Laya stated that the recent localised outbreaks of coronavirus in the country were under control and affected communities had been promptly isolated. González also stated that discussions were ongoing with foreign governments to arrange travel restrictions.

The British Government announced that travellers arriving in the country from mainland Spain will be required to enter a 14-day self-isolation due to a recent outbreak of cases in several regions, and that Spain had been removed from the government's list of safe countries and thus all non-essential travel was advised against, prompting several airlines and tour operators to cancel flights.

=== 26 July ===
European tour operator TUI cancelled all holiday bookings to mainland Spain up to 9 August and all bookings to the Canary Islands and Balearic Islands up to 4 August due to international travel restrictions imposed in response to a surge in coronavirus cases in some Spanish regions.

French health authorities announced that PCR nasal swab tests for COVID-19 will be made available for free in response to a rise in new cases recorded in the country.

Health authorities in the Bavarian district of Dingolfing-Landau imposed a lockdown on 480 employees at a farm after a recent outbreak led to over 170 testing positive for COVID-19.

President of the Italian region of Campania Vincenzo De Luca announced that people who do not wear a face mask in indoor areas in the city of Salerno will receive a 1,000 euro fine, with transport operators receiving powers to deny access to passengers who refuse to wear a mask. It was also announced that businesses failing to comply with coronavirus restrictions imposed by the regional or national government could also be fined and be ordered to close for up to thirty days.

=== 27 July ===
Restaurants and nightclubs were ordered to close and people were advised to stay at home in the Austrian town of St. Wolfgang im Salzkammergut after a recent outbreak of cases there, thought to be linked to the town's nightlife.

Belgian Prime Minister Sophie Wilmès announced a further tightening of coronavirus restrictions in response to rising cases in the country, in effect from 29 July. Under the new restrictions, the social gathering limit will be reduced from fifteen to five people, and remote work will be "strongly encouraged" by the Belgian government. All cultural events in the worst-affected municipalities will be prohibited, with indoor venues only permitted to have a maximum audience size of 100 and outdoor venues only permitted to have 200.

Minister-President of the German state of Bavaria Markus Söder announced that free-to-use coronavirus testing facilities will be constructed at train stations in the cities of Munich and Nuremberg, as well as at three major motorway routes near the Austria-Germany border: the border crossing at Walserberg in Austria, and near the Bavarian towns of Pocking and Kiefersfelden. German Health Minister Jens Spahn also announced that all travellers returning to Germany from countries deemed to be at a higher risk of coronavirus transmission will be required to have a mandatory test for the virus to prevent the possible importation of cases.

Health authorities in Greece announced that the government will likely extend legislation requiring people to wear face masks in shopping centres and places of worship.

Irish airline Ryanair reported a loss of 185 million euros in the first financial quarter of 2020 as a direct result of restrictions imposed during the COVID-19 pandemic, with passenger numbers falling by as much as 99 per cent.

Spanish Foreign Affairs Minister Arancha González Laya stated that negotiations were ongoing with British authorities to exclude the Canary Islands and Balearic Islands from the UK's 14-day quarantine measures for returning travellers, arguing that the coronavirus situation on the islands is on a similar level to in the UK.

British Minister of State for Health and Social Care Helen Whately stated that authorities are reviewing the coronavirus situation in several countries, including France and Germany, after criticism surrounding the abrupt quarantine imposed on travellers returning from Spain by the British government.

=== 28 July ===
American pharmaceutical company Pfizer announced that negotiations are ongoing with the European Union and several individual member states to agree on the sale of the company's potential COVID-19 vaccine.

French Transport Minister Jean-Baptiste Djebbari stated that the government will review proposed plans to build a fourth terminal at Charles de Gaulle Airport in the capital Paris as a result of the impact of the COVID-19 pandemic on the aviation industry, with the International Air Transport Association forecasting that global air traffic will not return to pre-coronavirus levels until 2024 at the earliest.

Greek Tourism Minister Harry Theocharis announced that the ports in Athens, Corfu, Heraklion, Katakolo, Rhodes and Volos will reopen to cruise ships from 1 August.

The Italian Senate approved legislation proposed by Prime Minister Giuseppe Conte to extend the country's state of emergency to 15 October, granting the government the authority to continue to make decisions regarding the COVID-19 pandemic without having to pass through parliament.

Authorities on the Portuguese island of Madeira announced that it will be mandatory to wear a face mask in all public areas, both indoors and outdoors, from 1 August, to attempt to prevent an increase in infections.

Spanish Economy Minister Nadia Calviño announced that the government has approved 40 billion euros in credit lines to help businesses deal with the COVID-19 pandemic. An initial tranche of 8 billion euros was released into the Spanish economy, with 5 billion euros of that going to small or mid-sized businesses. The National Institute of Statistics also revealed that over one million Spanish citizens have become unemployed during the second fiscal quarter of 2020, largely from the tourism industry.

President of the Spanish Community of Madrid Isabel Díaz Ayuso announced a tightening of coronavirus restrictions following surges in infections in several Spanish regions. From 30 July, face masks will be made mandatory in all public areas of the capital city Madrid, with the only exceptions being for children under six or when exercising, and social gatherings will be limited to ten people. It was also revealed that information campaigns will target the region's youth, to whom the spread of the virus is largely attributed.

The Turkish government announced that schools will be permitted to reopen from 31 August as long as the daily infection rate continues to decline. To be certified as "COVID-19 secure" and be permitted to reopen, schools will be required to take several preventive measures, including regular use of hand sanitiser, temperature screening for students and staff on arrival and ensuring that each room is well ventilated; authorities will inspect each school before it is allowed to reopen.

=== 29 July ===
The European Commission revealed that it has paid 63 million euros to secure a limited supply of the anti-viral drug remdesivir from the American pharmaceutical company Gilead Sciences, with orders placed to secure enough doses to treat approximately 30,000 coronavirus patients. Diplomats stated that they hope to secure more orders in the future.

Dutch Medical Care Minister Tamara van Ark stated that the country's government will not advise residents to wear face masks in public after mixed scientific evidence received by the Health Ministry; instead, authorities will emphasise the importance of social distancing to prevent coronavirus transmission.

The Portuguese Foreign Affairs Ministry stated that several member states of the European Union have already breached agreements aiming to ensure freedom of movement between all member countries after coronavirus lockdown restrictions were sufficiently eased to enable such a measure. Authorities cited travel restrictions to Portugal imposed by multiple countries, including Belgium, Finland and Ireland.

Pharmaceutical companies Sanofi and GlaxoSmithKline reached an agreement with the British government to provide up to 60 million doses of the companies' potential COVID-19 vaccine, with clinical trials scheduled to begin in September.

=== 30 July ===
The World Rugby Council approved the dates for the final rounds of the Six Nations Championship, played between England, France, Ireland, Italy, Northern Ireland and Scotland, now scheduled to be held on 24 and 31 October.

The mayors of several French cities announced a tightening of coronavirus restrictions to prevent further transmission of the virus. In the cities of Saint-Malo and Bayonne, masks were made mandatory throughout the city with the only exceptions being for children under 11; authorities in Orleans announced that masks will be mandatory at the city's markets and in the evening along the River Loire; the resort town of Biarritz announced that masks will be compulsory in the city centre and that access to beaches will be restricted at night to prevent large gatherings.

The Norwegian Foreign Affairs Ministry removed Belgium from a list of safe countries to travel to due to rising coronavirus cases in the country, therefore requiring all travellers returning to Norway from 1 August to enter a mandatory 10-day quarantine.

Polish Prime Minister Mateusz Morawiecki stated that his government may re-impose quarantine measures on travellers returning to the country from several European Union member states, including France and Spain, following recent surges in infections.

British Health Secretary Matt Hancock announced that coronavirus restrictions will be tightened in the county of Greater Manchester, and parts of West Yorkshire and eastern Lancashire due to high levels of transmission. Under the new restrictions, people from different households will not be able to meet in homes or gardens, and will not be allowed to mix in restaurants and pubs. The same restrictions were also imposed on the city of Leicester, in lockdown since 30 June, although restaurants, pubs and other leisure facilities will be permitted to reopen in the city from 31 July.

=== 31 July ===
European pharmaceutical companies GlaxoSmithKline and Sanofi revealed that they are in advanced discussions with leaders of the European Union to provide up to 300 million doses of potential COVID-19 vaccines.

The French National Institute of Statistics reported a record 13.8 per cent decrease in the country's GDP in the second quarter of 2020, directly linked to the closure of non-essential businesses during the COVID-19 pandemic.

The German Foreign Office issued a travel warning against all non-essential travel to the Spanish autonomous communities of Aragon, Catalonia and Navarre following surges in coronavirus infections there, with all returning travellers required to receive either a COVID-19 test or enter quarantine for two weeks.

Greek authorities announced an extension of the country's mask-wearing requirements, with face masks now mandatory in all indoor areas and also in outdoor areas where social distancing cannot be maintained.

The Italian National Institute of Statistics reported that the country's GDP decreased by 12.4 per cent in the second quarter of 2020 as a direct result of restrictions imposed to control the spread of coronavirus.

Norwegian cruise ship company Hurtigruten instructed 160 crew and around 200 passengers who had travelled on board the Roald Amundsen to self-isolate after three crew members tested positive for COVID-19.

Scottish First Minister Nicola Sturgeon advised the public against all non-essential travel to some northern parts of England, including the entire county of Greater Manchester, after new lockdown restrictions were imposed there following rises in rates of infection.

British Prime Minister Boris Johnson postponed the next stage of easing coronavirus restrictions in England after rising rates of infection in several northern counties, with casinos, bowling alleys and facial beauty salons remaining closed; it was also announced that face coverings will be mandatory in all cinemas, museums and places of worship from 8 August. England's Chief Medical Officer Chris Whitty stated that the country has "probably reached the limit of what we can do".

== Reactions and measures in South and Southeast Asia ==
=== 1 July ===
Malaysian Education Minister Mohd Radzi Md Jidin has announced that schools for other students will reopen in two stages from 15 July. Secondary school pupils, senior primary pupils, and remove class students will return on 15 July while junior primary pupils will return on 22 July.

In Thailand, schools and leisure venues such as restaurants reopened with strict social distancing rules and temperature checks in place.

=== 3 July ===
Malaysian Minister of Health Adham Baba announced that both Malaysian citizens and foreign nationals traveling to Malaysia would be required to pay fees while undergoing COVID-19 tests.

=== 5 July ===
Managers of the India's Taj Mahal tourist attraction in Agra announced that it will remain closed for the foreseeable future due to public health concerns.

=== 9 July ===
Pakistani Federal Minister for Education and Professional Training Shafqat Mahmood announced that all schools, colleges, and universities will reopen on 15 September with strict hygiene measures in place.

=== 10 July ===
Indian Prime Minister Narendra Modi announced that a nine-day curfew will be imposed in Aurangabad due to a spike in coronavirus cases. The state of Uttar Pradesh also entered lockdown for two days due to surging cases.

Malaysian Senior Minister Ismail Sabri Yaakob announced that family entertainment centres including game arcades, karaoke centres, indoor funfairs, edutainment centres for children, and kids' gymnasiums will be allowed to resume operations from 15 July.

=== 11 July ===
Authorities in the Indian-administered territory of Jammu and Kashmir are reportedly considering imposing a regional lockdown after the number of confirmed coronavirus cases there passed 10,000.

India's Drug Controller General granted approval for the drug itolizumab developed by Indian biopharmaceutical company Biocon Ltd to be used in emergency situations on moderately to severely affected coronavirus patients.

=== 12 July ===
Researchers at Chulalongkorn University in Bangkok announced that human trials of a potential vaccine for COVID-19 will begin with 10,000 volunteers in November, with the aim of producing by the end of 2021.

=== 13 July ===
The Government of Sri Lanka ordered all state schools in the country to close due to a rise in coronavirus cases, with private schools strongly encouraged to close as well.

=== 14 July ===
Human Rights Watch urged the National Bank of Cambodia and the Cambodian Government to suspend debt collection and interest accruals for those who can no longer make the payments as a result of the COVID-19 pandemic, arguing that debt relief measures provided to struggling citizens by micro-loan providers have not been successful.

The Indian city of Bangalore returned to lockdown for a week as a result of surging coronavirus cases in the country. Under the new restrictions, all non-essential shops were forced to close, with essential shops and pharmacies only permitted to open in the morning. All public transport and travel to different regions was also suspended.

Malaysian Foreign Minister Hishammuddin Hussein and Singaporean Foreign Minister Vivian Balakrishnan have announced that cross-border travel and traffic between the two countries will resume on 10 August 2020.

=== 15 July ===
Indian Prime Minister Narendra Modi revealed that several cities and states, including the cities of Bangalore, Pune and Shillong and the states of Uttar Pradesh, Tamil Nadu and Assam, will have coronavirus lockdowns re-imposed due to surging infections in the country.

Primary and secondary schools in Malaysia were permitted to reopen in stages due to a sustained drop in coronavirus infections in the country, with strict hygiene measures in place.

=== 16 July ===
Authorities in Indian-controlled territory of Kashmir announced that Hindus will be allowed to make the pilgrimage to the holy Amarnath Temple in the Himalayas, due to begin on 21 July, although only 500 pilgrims a day will be permitted to ensure social distancing measures can be enforced.

=== 17 July ===
Indian pharmaceutical company Cadila Healthcare announced that late-stage trials of the company's possible COVID-19 vaccine are due to be completed in March 2021, with the potential to produce 100 million doses of the vaccine every year.

Health authorities in the Pakistani province of Sindh extended the lockdown there until at least 15 August in response to surging coronavirus cases, with most non-essential businesses remaining closed, and residents advised to maintain a social distance of three feet and wear a face mask in all public spaces.

=== 20 July ===
Malaysian Prime Minister Muhyiddin Yassin has announced that the Malaysian Government is considering making face masks compulsory following the emergence of 13 clusters after the Government relaxed lockdown restrictions on movement and businesses in June 2020.

=== 21 July ===
Authorities in Nepal announced that international flights to and from the country will resume on 17 August after being suspended during the COVID-19 pandemic.

=== 22 July ===
Organisers of the holy Hindu pilgrimage to Amarnath Temple cancelled the event due to the surging coronavirus cases in the Indian-controlled territory of Kashmir.

Officials in Thailand stated that the country's state of emergency imposed to control the COVID-19 pandemic will be extended to the end of August, despite the Thai government not reporting a domestically transmitted case in almost two months. Taweesin Visanuyothin, a spokesperson for the Thai Health Ministry, stated that business executives, migrant labourers, film crews and medical tourists will be gradually permitted to travel to the country in an attempt to recover some economic losses; all arriving travellers will be tested for COVID-19 on arrival and must undergo a mandatory 14-day quarantine.

=== 23 July ===
Malaysian Senior Minister Ismail Sabri Yaakob has announced that it will be compulsory for people to wear face masks in public spaces such as markets and public transportation from 1 August. Violators may face a RM1,000 (US$235 fine).

=== 25 July ===
Malaysian Trade Minister Mohamed Azmin Ali stated that the 2020 Asia-Pacific Economic Cooperation summit could potentially go ahead in the capital Kuala Lumpur in November, despite various international travel restrictions imposed because of the COVID-19 pandemic.

=== 26 July ===
Indian Aviation Minister Hardeep Singh Puri revealed that over 800,000 Indian citizens have been repatriated from over fifty countries since May under the government's Vande Bharat Mission.

Malaysian Senior Minister Ismail Sabri Yaakob announced that the federal government will limit inter-zone movement in Sarawak particularly around the state capital Kuchin in a bid to curb the spread of COVID-19 within that state.

=== 27 July ===
Indian Prime Minister Narendra Modi virtually opened three high-tech coronavirus testing facilities in the cities of Noida, Mumbai and Kolkata, with each facility having the capacity to perform over 10,000 tests a day.

=== 28 July ===
Pakistani Prime Minister Imran Khan urged Pakistanis to continue to follow government guidelines including social distancing and limiting contact with others over concerns that the Islamic festival of Eid al-Adha on 31 July could lead to a surge in coronavirus infections.

=== 29 July ===
Indian pharmaceutical company Hetero Drugs received approval from drug regulators to distribute its version of the anti-viral drug favipiravir, with sales scheduled to begin from 5 August. This comes as a study in the city of Mumbai found that over half of the city's slum residents had COVID-19 antibodies, implying that they have previously had the virus, raising concerns over the accuracy of the Indian government's official data.

=== 30 July ===
The Nepalese government reopened hotels, restaurants and casinos to reduce the economic consequences of the COVID-19 pandemic; permits for climbing several mountains in the Himalayas, including Mount Everest were also issued for the first time in over four months.

=== 31 July ===
Indian automotive manufacturing company Tata Motors reported a net loss of 84 billion rupees during the second quarter of 2020, as a result of declining sales in Europe and China exacerbated by the COVID-19 pandemic.

== Reactions and measures in the Western Pacific ==
=== 1 July ===
Health authorities in the Australian state of Victoria announced that a stage-three lockdown will be enforced in 36 suburbs north of Melbourne for a month from midnight on 2 July after a recent surge in cases in the area, prompting concerns over a possible second wave of infections. Under the new restrictions, residents will only be allowed to leave their homes for essential reasons, with Premier of Victoria Daniel Andrews warning that tighter restrictions could be brought in if the situation does not improve.

In Japan, Tokyo Disneyland and Tokyo DisneySea reopened to the public after closing at the peak of the COVID-19 pandemic. Visitors to the attractions must maintain a social distance, book any admission tickets in advance and undergo mandatory temperature checks on arrival, with the number of entrants at a reduced capacity.

North Korea's Ministry of Public Health has reopened the country's schools and made it mandatory to wear a face covering in public spaces. The country's ban on large gatherings was also maintained.

=== 2 July ===
New Zealand Health Minister David Clark resigns from his portfolio, stating that "he had becoming a distraction in the Government's ongoing response to the COVID-19 pandemic in New Zealand and health reforms."

=== 3 July ===
Japan's Government Pension Investment Fund recorded losses of $77 billion in the most recent fiscal year according to government data, the largest decrease since the Great Recession. It was directly attributed to the COVID-19 pandemic.

=== 4 July ===
Governor of Tokyo Yuriko Koike asked residents not to travel beyond the city's borders to prevent the spread of coronavirus, after Tokyo recorded over 100 new cases for the third consecutive day.

=== 6 July ===
The Victorian Premier Daniel Andrews and New South Wales Premier Gladys Berejiklian have closed the border between their states for the first time since the Spanish flu pandemic of 1918–1919 in response to a spike of cases in Victoria, which recorded 127 cases overnight.

=== 7 July ===
In Australia, Victorian Premier Daniel Andrews announced that metropolitan Melbourne and Mitchell Shire would re-enter lockdown from 12am 9 July for 6 weeks.

The New Zealand Government has requested that Air New Zealand and Singapore Airlines managed international bookings to New Zealand over the next three weeks to ensure that quarantine facilities are not overwhelmed. Air New Zealand had confirmed that 5,500 people are confirmed to travel back to New Zealand with the airline over the next three weeks.

=== 9 July ===
The Australian state of Queensland closed its borders to people arriving from Victoria as the city of Melbourne began a new lockdown in response to rising coronavirus cases, with residents given stay-at-home notices for six weeks.

The Chinese Ministry of Science and Technology announced that it would be seeking international cooperation to work on developing vaccine and drugs to treat COVID-19. Chinese authorities also stated that no international sports events will take place for the remainder of the year, with the exception of trials for the 2022 Winter Olympics, to prevent possible imported cases.

=== 10 July ===
Australian Prime Minister Scott Morrison stated that the number of Australian citizens allowed to return to the country every day will be halved from 8,000 to 4,000 on 13 July in response to rising cases, most notable in the state of Victoria.

The Education Bureau of Hong Kong announced that schools will be immediately suspended from 13 July as a result of a spike in domestically transmitted coronavirus cases in the territory.

Scientific researchers at Japan's Fujita Health University published the results of a potential favipiravir drug developed by Fujifilm to treat COVID-19; results of the tests yielded inconclusive results as to the efficacy of the drug.

The New Zealand Government has announced that overseas-based victims of the Christchurch mosque shootings would receive special border passes and financial help in order to fly to New Zealand for the duration of the gunman Brenton Tarrant's sentencing, which begins on 24 August.

The General Statistics Office of Vietnam revealed that the COVID-19 pandemic has resulted in 900,000 job losses in the country, with 18 million people receiving a lower income than before the pandemic. Unemployment in Vietnam's urban communities reportedly rose to the highest level in ten years as a direct result of lockdown restrictions.

=== 12 July ===
Governor of Okinawa Prefecture Denny Tamaki urged American military officials to take tougher preventative measures and have greater transparency after 61 military personnel tested positive for COVID-19 at two different Marine Corps bases, Air Station Futenma and Camp Hansen, in a matter of days. US military officials responded by placing the bases into quarantine.

The Taipei Film Festival in Taiwan went ahead despite the COVID-19 pandemic, making it the first in-person film-festival to be held worldwide in 2020.

=== 13 July ===
The Walt Disney Company announced that Hong Kong Disneyland will be temporarily closed again from 15 July due to rising coronavirus cases in the city, although all on-site hotels will remain open with limited services available.

Organisers of the 2020 Hong Kong Book Fair postponed the event, scheduled to be held from 15 July, after the Hong Kong Government announced that large public gatherings will be banned due to rising coronavirus cases in the city.

=== 14 July ===
Health authorities in Hong Kong announced a tightening of lockdown restrictions after several days of rising coronavirus cases, raising concerns of a possible second wave of infections. Under the new restrictions, face masks were made mandatory on public transport with fines of up to 5,000 Hong Kong dollars if caught without one; non-essential businesses including gyms and entertainment venues were forced to close and restaurants were told to close indoor dining areas. Social gatherings were also reduced to a maximum of four people.

Health authorities in the Japanese capital of Tokyo revealed that they urgently needed to contact around 800 people who had attended productions at the Theatre Molière after several cases of coronavirus were reported in the cast and audience.

In the Philippines, Secretary of the Interior and Local Government Eduardo Año announced that house-to-house searches for coronavirus patients will be conducted by the Philippine National Police to prevent further spread of the virus in the country.

Data from Singapore's Ministry of Trade and Industry suggested that the country's economy contracted by a record 41% in the second quarter due to the COVID-19 pandemic; the country's economy entered its first recession since the Great Recession.

=== 15 July ===
The Chinese Ministry of Culture and Tourism announced an easing of restrictions on domestic tourism, with popular destinations allowed to increase visitor capacity from 30 per cent to 50 per cent, and inter province tours also permitted to resume.

Authorities in the Japanese capital of Tokyo raised the city's coronavirus alert level to the highest level following a surge in infections. Governor Yuriko Koike urged residents to avoid non-essential travel outside of Tokyo and also to avoid visiting businesses that have not implemented suitable preventative measures for COVID-19.

New Zealand Prime Minister Jacinda Ardern released the Government's COVID-19 response framework, which would involve localised lockdowns in the event there was another community-wide outbreak of COVID-19.

Health officials in the South Korean city of Pyeongtaek have asked the country's government to request pre-arrival coronavirus tests for American soldiers stationed at Camp Humphreys following a spike in infections amongst American military personnel there.

Organisers of the 2020 Mercuries Taiwan Masters golf tournament cancelled the event, scheduled to be held from 17 to 20 September, due to coronavirus health concerns and international travel restrictions on players and audiences, with the event now scheduled to be played in the same time period in 2021.

=== 16 July ===
Chinese pharmaceutical company Fosun Pharmaceutical received permission from health authorities to begin the first phase of human trials of the company's potential COVID-19 vaccine using technology developed by German company BioNtech.

The National Bureau of Statistics of China revealed that the Chinese GDP increased by 3.2 per cent in the second fiscal quarter of 2020 despite the COVID-19 pandemic, attributed to lifting of lockdown restrictions and the reopening of factories.

=== 17 July ===
Australian Prime Minister Scott Morrison announced a 400 million Australian dollar funding programme to provide cash grants to international film studios, with the aim of encouraging companies to work in Australia over a seven-year period, with an estimated AU$3 billion in foreign expenditure and 8,000 jobs predicted to be created under the scheme.

In China, the capital of the Xinjiang province Ürümqi cancelled more than 600 flights from Ürümqi Diwopu International Airport after the first case in over five months was confirmed in the province, sparking fears of a potential new wave of infections. Subway services in the city were also suspended.

The World Health Organization announced that the team of international experts tasked with studying the spread of COVID-19 from China will be delayed to the end of July.

=== 19 July ===
Premier of the Australian state of Victoria, Daniel Andrews, announced that it will now be mandatory for the public to wear face masks in public areas due to the rising coronavirus cases in the state, with fines of up to 200 Australian dollars if caught without one.

Health authorities in the Chinese province of Xinjiang declared the capital Ürümqi and the surrounding area to be in a "wartime situation" due to the recent outbreak of coronavirus infections in the city. Several restrictions were introduced, including a ban on visits to different households and mass COVID-19 screening in public buildings; authorities also urged residents of Ürümqi not to leave the city for non-essential reasons.

Chief Executive of Hong Kong Carrie Lam announced a tightening of coronavirus restrictions in Hong Kong due to the surging daily infections in the city. All non-essential civil servants were instructed to work remotely, and face masks were made mandatory in all indoor public areas, with non-essential leisure businesses including gyms and theme parks remaining closed for an additional week.

=== 20 July ===
Cinemas in several "low-risk" Chinese cities were permitted to reopen at 30 per cent capacity, with mandatory temperature checks on arrival and the requirement for customers and staff to wear face masks; the sale of refreshments was also prohibited. Some cities, including the capital Beijing, kept their cinemas closed, instead allowing local authorities to decide whether or not to reopen them.

Several major international banking companies in Hong Kong announced that they would be temporarily closing some branches in the city due to a surge in domestically transmitted coronavirus cases. Banks closing some services included HSBC, Bank of China, Standard Chartered and Bank of East Asia.

=== 21 July ===
Health authorities in the Chinese province of Xinjiang announced that free coronavirus tests will be provided to the 3.5 million residents of the capital Ürümqi after a recent outbreak of cases there. The Civil Aviation Administration of China also announced that passengers on international flights to China must provide evidence of a negative COVID-19 test result taken at most five days before departure to be allowed to board the plane.

The New Zealand Health Minister Chris Hipkins announced that the Government would be investing NZ$302 million into various health services over the next two years including the National Close Contact Service, the National Immunisation Solution, telehealth services, and purchasing more ventilators, respiratory equipment, and personal protective equipment supplies.

=== 22 July ===
Face masks became mandatory in the Australian city of Melbourne after surging coronavirus cases in the state of Victoria. The Victoria State Government announced that workers who do not have sick leave will be able to apply for a payment of 300 Australian dollars while they await a COVID-19 test result, after reports suggested that recent outbreaks could be attributed to employees not taking time off work to wait for results.

Hong Kong Secretary for Food and Health Sophia Chan announced that face masks will be mandatory on public transport and in indoor spaces, as well as transport hubs, with immediate effect until 5 August due to recent outbreaks of the virus in Hong Kong. Chan also urged residents to only travel for essential reasons.

The Japanese Health Ministry approved the use of dexamethasone to treat moderate or advanced cases of COVID-19, after trials showed that the drug significantly reduced the mortality rate.

=== 23 July ===
The China National Pharmaceutical Group stated that the company's potential COVID-19 vaccine could be available for purchase by the end of the year, despite previous estimates of trials of the vaccine not being completed until 2021. Researchers stated that clinical trials of the potential vaccine should be completed within three months.

Authorities in Papua New Guinea asked the World Health Organization to deploy an emergency medical team to assist the country in mitigating the COVID-19 pandemic after almost twenty of the country's thirty cases were reported within a week.

Authorities in the Philippines reimposed a ban on non-essential travel both domestically and internationally due to complications with health insurance and surging infection rates in many parts of the world.

The Bank of Korea reported that South Korea's gross domestic product (GDP) contracted by 3.3 per cent in the second fiscal quarter between April and June, making it the steepest decline since 1998. The country's vital exports industry also declined by a record 16.6 per cent.

=== 24 July ===
Authorities in the Chinese coastal city of Dalian placed the city into a "war-time mode" to contain a recent outbreak of COVID-19 cases linked to a seafood factory. New restrictions imposed by the government include mandatory tests for anybody travelling on the city's subway system, nurseries being forced to close, and the potential for some communities to be placed under a lockdown if authorities see no improvement in the situation.

The Chinese Civil Aviation Authority revealed that daily commercial flights had increased to approximately 80 per cent of pre-COVID levels, as a result of authorities lifting restrictions imposed on the aviation industry in recent months.

=== 25 July ===
The Chinese capital of Beijing partially reopened cinemas in districts with lower rates of coronavirus transmission. Under the new restrictions, all tickets must be pre-booked, social distancing must be maintained and venues can only operate at thirty per cent capacity; it was also announced that mandatory temperature screening will be enforced upon entry.

Prime Minister of Vietnam Nguyễn Xuân Phúc signed legislation prohibiting all wildlife imports and the operation of wildlife markets after considerable scientific evidence of increased transmission involving such industries; tougher penalties for poachers will also be introduced. This comes as Vietnam recorded its first domestically transmitted case of COVID-19 in over three months.

=== 26 July ===
Cruise tour operator Genting Hong Kong resumed island-hopping cruises around the Taiwanese islands with several coronavirus restrictions: social distancing must be maintained at all times, increased ventilation, routine sanitisation of public areas, and all crew members were placed in a three-week quarantine with mandatory COVID-19 tests before the cruise departed.

North Korean Supreme Leader Kim Jong-un imposed a total coronavirus lockdown and declared a state of emergency in the border city of Kaesong over concerns of a possible outbreak in the city after authorities identified an individual expressing COVID-19 symptoms. The suspected case and all of their social contacts have been placed into quarantine according to North Korean state media.

Health authorities in the Vietnamese city of Da Nang announced a tightening of coronavirus lockdown measures after Vietnam reported its first two domestically transmitted cases in over three months. Under the new restrictions, gatherings of more than thirty people are prohibited, and non-essential businesses including amusement parks, bars, beauty salons and nightclubs were ordered to close.

=== 27 July ===
Authorities in Hong Kong announced a further tightening of coronavirus restrictions in effect from 29 July after a recent surge in cases. Under the new restrictions, social gatherings of more than two people will be prohibited, all restaurants must close indoor dining, and face masks will be made mandatory in all public spaces, both indoors and outdoors.

Japanese Economy Minister Yasutoshi Nishimura urged business leaders to improve coronavirus preventative measures, including increasing the level of telecommunications to encourage employees to work remotely.

Authorities in Vietnam postponed the 2020 ASEAN summit to September and instructed over 80,000 tourists in the city of Da Nang to leave the country after a recent outbreak of domestically transmitted cases, despite not reporting any new cases in three months.

=== 28 July ===
Australian health authorities announced that a medical team will be sent to Papua New Guinea to assist the country in dealing with a surge in coronavirus infections. Australian Prime Minister Scott Morrison also cut short an interstate tour of Australia after reports of several large outbreaks of coronavirus in nursing homes.

Japanese automobile manufacturer Nissan reported a $2.7 billion net loss in the first fiscal quarter of 2020, warning that the company could finish the financial year with an annual net loss of $6.4 billion, as a direct result of restrictions imposed to mitigate the COVID-19 pandemic.

Authorities in Vietnam announced that a two-week lockdown will be imposed in the city of Da Nang after a surge in domestically transmitted cases there. All public transport in and out of the city has been suspended, and tourists have been told to leave the city as soon as possible; residents must only leave their homes for essential reasons, and all non-essential businesses including beauty salons and bars were ordered to close, with all large sporting, religious and cultural events cancelled. Authorities established several police checkpoints to ensure that the population comply with the measures.

=== 29 July ===
Premier of the Australian state of Queensland Annastacia Palaszczuk announced that the state's border with Sydney will be closed from 2 August to prevent transmission of coronavirus, and that all Queensland residents returning to the state will be required to undergo a mandatory 14-day quarantine at their own expense. Australian health authorities also deployed an emergency medical team to nursing homes in the Victorian state capital of Melbourne due to a recent coronavirus outbreak there.

Several new coronavirus restrictions came into effect in Hong Kong following consistent increases in daily infections: social gatherings of more than two people were prohibited, restaurants were forced to close all indoor areas, masks were made mandatory in all public spaces, and quarantine measures for crew on planes and cruise ships were tightened.

On 29 July, New Zealand Housing Minister Megan Woods announced that citizens entering the country temporarily and most non-citizens and non-residents with the exception of family members of citizens, diplomats, or those in the country for the Christchurch mosque shootings trial would have to pay for their 14-day stay in managed isolation. However, New Zealanders intending to return home permanently will be exempt from these charges.

Authorities in the Vietnamese capital of Hanoi ordered bars and pubs to close from midnight on 30 July, and announced a ban on large social gatherings, as a result of a COVID-19 outbreak in the city of Da Nang, as well as state-owned media reporting several cases of the virus in Hanoi and Ho Chi Minh City, despite the country having previously gone three months without reporting a single domestically transmitted case.

=== 30 July ===
Premier of the Australian state of Victoria, Daniel Andrews, announced that face masks will be mandatory in all indoor and outdoor spaces from 2 August, and that residents of the local government areas of Colac Otway, Golden Plains, Greater Geelong, Moorabool, Queenscliffe and Surf Coast will not be permitted to visit other households or have visitors in their homes in an attempt to limit the spread of coronavirus; Andrews did not rule out imposing tougher restrictions if the situation in Victoria does not improve.

Authorities in the Chinese city of Ürümqi announced a tightening of travel restrictions following recent outbreaks of coronavirus in the city. Under the new restrictions, non-residents planning on leaving the city must test negative for COVID-19 before being permitted to leave if they have stayed there for more than two weeks, in an attempt to contain the outbreak.

Authorities in Hong Kong reversed previous legislation prohibiting restaurants from offering indoor dining due to public disapproval.

Health officials in the Vietnamese capital of Hanoi revealed plans to perform COVID-19 tests on over 20,000 tourists who have returned from the city of Da Nang following an outbreak of domestically transmitted cases there, with residents instructed to contact their local authorities to receive a testing kit.

=== 31 July ===
Officials in the Chinese city of Ürümqi announced a further tightening of travel restrictions, with anybody arriving from areas deemed to have higher levels of coronavirus transmission required to undergo a mandatory 14-day quarantine, with arrivals from areas with lower transmission rates required to provide evidence that they are in "good health".

The Indonesian island of Bali reopened to domestic tourists, although international tourism cannot resume until 11 September.

President of the Philippines Rodrigo Duterte extended several coronavirus restrictions in the capital city of Manila to the middle of August due to rises in infection rates. The capital and surrounding areas were placed into a 'general community quarantine', enabling authorities to restrict the movements of the elderly and children, as well as the operation of non-essential businesses including gyms and restaurants. Duterte also stated that any COVID-19 vaccines available by the end of the year will be free to receive, with the poor and middle class populations prioritised in receiving them, and added that the Philippines will receive priority from the Chinese government for vaccine distribution.

Authorities in Vietnam recorded the country's first two coronavirus-related deaths in the city of Da Nang, raising concerns both nationally and internationally of a possible escalation of the pandemic in the country, which had gone almost three months without a domestically transmitted case before a recent outbreak. The island nation of Fiji also recorded its first coronavirus death.

== See also ==
- Timeline of the COVID-19 pandemic
