= Saad Alfarargi =

United Nations Special Rapporteur

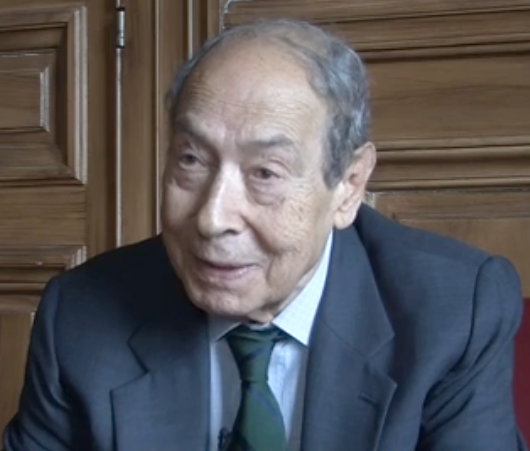
- In a UNOHCHR video in 2017

United Nations Special Rapporteur on the right to development
- In office 1 May 2017 – Present

Personal details
- Born: 1 November 1936 Dakahlia, Egypt
- Education: Cairo University
- Occupation: United Nations Special Rapporteur on the right to development

Saad Alfarargi (born 1936) has been the United Nations Special Rapporteur on the Right to Development from 1 May 2017 until 31 April 2023.

== Education ==
Bachelor in Commerce, Cairo University, 1956. Master of Science in Political Science, University Cairo, 1956. degree in International Relations, London School of Economics.

== Responsibilities ==
=== In Egypt ===
Assistant to Minister of Foreign Affairs of Egypt; Chief of the Presidential Bureau for Economic Affairs, Presidency, Cairo Director General for International Economic Affairs, Ministry of Foreign Affairs, Cairo; Chief of Cabinet of the Minister of State for Foreign Affairs and Special Political Adviser, Ministry of Foreign Affairs, Cairo;

=== At the United Nations ===
UN Assistant Secretary General (ASG) Assistant Administrator of the UNDP and Regional Director for Arab States, New York Ambassador, Permanent Representative of Egypt to the UN in Geneva Specialized Agencies and other International Organizations in Switzerland; Special rapporteur for the United Nations Special Session on Disarmament Expert for the United Nations Disarmament Centre

== Activities ==
- 1956—1957: Attaché League of Arab States, Cairo
- 1957—1960: Worked at Ministry of Foreign Affairs, Cairo
- 1960—1964: Third secretary Embassy of Egypt, Vienna
- 1969—1972: Head of economic section, Ministry of Foreign Affairs, Cairo,
- 1972—1973: Chief of cabinet of minister of state
- 1973—1977: Counsellor permanent mission of Egypt United Nations, New York City
- 1989—1995: Governor Egypt Common Fund for Commodities, Amsterdam
- 1998—2012: Permanent Observer of the League of Arab States to the UN Geneva
- Present: Editor-in-Chief of the political affairs periodical Diplomat

== Articles by Saad Alfarargi ==
Saad Alfarargi has published articles on different subjects including business and security. peace and security, economic development, disarmament and world trade, international order.
