= Marada Movement =

Marada Movement تيار المردة
- Abbreviation: MM
- President: Suleiman Frangieh, Jr.
- Founder: Suleiman Frangieh
- Founded: 1967 (as militia); 1991 (as party)
- Headquarters: Zgharta, Lebanon
- Ideology: Lebanese nationalism Christian democracy Historically: Pro-Syria (before 2025)
- Political position: Right-wing
- Religion: Maronite Catholicism
- National affiliation: March 8 Alliance
- Colors: Blue and green
- Parliamentary bloc: Independent National Bloc
- Military wing: Marada Brigade (1967-1991)
- Parliament of Lebanon: 2 / 128
- Cabinet of Lebanon: 0 / 24

Party flag

Website
- elmarada.org

The Marada Movement (Arabic: تيار المردة, romanized: Tayyār Al-Marada) is a Lebanese political party and a former militia active during the Lebanese Civil War named after the legendary Marada (also called Mardaites) warriors of the early Middle Ages that fought on the external edge of the Byzantine Empire. Originally designated the Marada Brigade (لواء المردة Liwa al-Marada), the group initially emerged as the personal militia of Suleiman Frangieh, president of Lebanon at the outbreak of the war in 1975, which also had a Parliamentary wing known as the Frangieh Bloc. They were also initially known as the Zgharta Liberation Army, after Frangieh's hometown of Zgharta in northern Lebanon.

== Marada in Lebanese history ==
The Marada were a group of independent communities in Lebanon and the surrounding highlands after the conquest of Syria by the Arab army in 630 CE. While some historians argue that the Marada "States" were that of a Maronite Aramaic-speaking Christian warrior elite, other historians tend to downplay their importance, and describe a more complex scenario. The Maronites and thus the Marada were given relative autonomy in the Umayyad Caliphate. The Marada were known by some as a fierce warrior group, and according to some, the name was synonymous with the Arabic word for rebels or also Maronites.

=== Lebanese civil war ===
During the Lebanese civil war was called one of the Maronite militias "Marada Movement". During the Lebanese civil war, Zgharta was the frontline and Christian stronghold of the north in northern Lebanon. The Zgharta-based Marada Brigade militia successfully repulsed and responded with attacks on armed militias from Tripoli, Danniyeh and Koura districts, and from PLO militias from the neighboring Palestinian refugee camps of Beddawi and Nahr al-Bared.

In March 1976, the Marada Brigade supported the hard-pressed Lebanese Army Republican Guard Battalion in defending the Presidential Palace in Baabda from a two-pronged combined LNM–LAA assault, though prior to the attack the Lebanese President had decamped to the safety of Jounieh.

The Marada were initially allied with the Kataeb until 1978, the year when Suleiman Frangieh refused the Lebanese Front's plan to declare a Christian canton, a Christian enclave separated from the rest of the country. A new alliance was formed between Suleiman Frangieh and Prime Minister Rachid Karami to counter the Lebanese Front's plan that called for separate enclaves/cantons of Christians, Druze and Muslims. Frangieh became firmly set against the onset of a Lebanese federal state that would make an alliance with Israel, promoted instead an Arab pro-Syrian alliance and stopped attending meetings with the Lebanese Front.

The incident is known as the Ehden massacre. Kataeb member at the time Samir Geagea, who allegedly headed the Phalangist force responsible for the Ehden massacre, admitted that he was among the "military squad" that was in charge of the Ehden "operation", but he denied taking part in the massacre, claiming that he was shot in his right hand before getting to the area and was taken to a hospital. Elie Hobeika has always denied taking part in the killing.

=== Modern politics ===
After the 2005 legislative elections, the Marada became a member of the (pro-Syrian) opposition alliance together with Hezbollah.

In June 2006, the Marada Movement was officially launched as a political party during a ceremony attended by supporters and representatives from Hezbollah, Amal Movement, the Free Patriotic Movement, and several pro-Syrian political figures.

In the 2009 Lebanese general election, Marada won all 3 seats in the electoral district of Zgharta, Marada was initially part of the Change and Reform bloc but left in 2013.

In the 2010 municipal election, Marada won in Zgharta and won a total of 17 out of 31 municipalities in the Zgharta District.

In the 2018 Lebanese general election, Marada won 3 seats in North III: 2 Maronite seats in Zgharta and 1 Orthodox seat in Koura. After the elections, Frangieh formed the Independent National Bloc (Arabic: التكتل الوطني) with Farid Haykal Khazen, Faisal Karami, Jihad Al Samad and Jbeil Shia MP Moustafa Husseini.

Faisal Karami and Jihad Al Samad left the bloc, Koura MP Fayez Ghosn and Jbeil MP Moustafa Husseini died which left the bloc with only 2 MP.

In the 2022 Lebanese general election, only one official Marada candidate Tony Frangieh Jr. won, Marada candidate in Tripoli Rafli Diab got the highest preferential votes for the Orthodox seat in North II but lost, Koura candidate Fadi Ghosn (brother of Fayez Ghosn) lost in favor of William Tawk.

After the elections, Tony Frangieh formed a bloc with several MPs that represent feudal families (Frangieh, Khazen, Tawk, Murr) and their presidential candidate for the 2022–2025 Lebanese presidential election is Suleiman Frangieh.

== Controversy ==
=== Killings ===
On 16 June 1957, Sleiman Frangieh and his followers killed 30 people loyal to the Douaihy family in a church in Miziara. The massacre is known as Miziara massacre.

Amid tensions in the North between the Kataeb and Marada parties when the Kataeb tried to expand their power in the region, Marada militiamen assassinated Joud el Bayeh, a Kataeb leader in Zgharta, which ignited the Ehden massacre. To seek revenge for the Ehden massacre, on 28 June 1978, Marada brigades affiliates captured and killed 26 Kataeb members in the villages of Qaa and Ras Baalback, the massacre is known as Qaa massacre.

On 2 May 1987, a Zgharta unit called Marada 3/400 set up an ambush to kill Bahaa Douaihy and Roumanos Douaihy amid the long-running Frangieh and Douaihy clans conflict.

Between 2005 and 2008 numerous attacks targeted and killed multiple Lebanese Forces members. Those killed include: Riad Abi Khater in Batroun, Pierre Ishac in Bsarma and Tony Issa in Dahr-al-Ain.

=== Attacks ===
The Marada militia destroyed the house of Greek Orthodox MP Fouad Ghosn in the town of Kousba in the Koura district after he voted for Bachir Gemayel during the 1982 Lebanese presidential election.

Marada loyalist burned the house of newly elected MP Samir Frangieh because Sleiman Frangieh lost the 2005 elections.

== List of Marada leaders ==
- Suleiman Frangieh (1967–1976)
- Tony Frangieh (1976–1978)
- Robert Frangieh (1978–1990)
- Suleiman Frangieh, Jr. (1990–present)

== See also ==
- Army of Free Lebanon
- Ehden massacre
- Lebanese Civil War
- Lebanese Front
- Lebanese National Salvation Front
- Marada Brigade

== Bibliography ==
- Claire Hoy and Victor Ostrovsky, By Way of Deception: The Making and Unmaking of a Mossad Officer, St. Martin's Press, New York 1990. ISBN 0-9717595-0-2
- Denise Ammoun, Histoire du Liban contemporain: Tome 2 1943-1990, Fayard, Paris 2005. ISBN 978-2-213-61521-9 (in French)
- Edgar O'Ballance, Civil War in Lebanon, 1975-92, Palgrave Macmillan, London 1998. ISBN 0-333-72975-7
- Jago Salmon, Massacre and Mutilation: Understanding the Lebanese Forces through their use of violence, Workshop on the 'techniques of Violence in Civil War', PRIO, Oslo, 20–21 August 2004. – [PDF] Understanding the Lebanese Forces through their use of - Free Download PDF
- Rex Brynen, Sanctuary and Survival: the PLO in Lebanon, Boulder: Westview Press, Oxford 1990. ISBN 0 86187 123 5 – Sanctuary and Survival: The PLO in Lebanon
- Robert Fisk, Pity the Nation: Lebanon at War, London: Oxford University Press, (3rd ed. 2001). ISBN 0-19-280130-9
- Matthew S. Gordon, The Gemayels (World Leaders Past & Present), Chelsea House Publishers, New York 1988. ISBN 1-55546-834-9
