= Inter-Christian conflicts in Lebanon =

Sub-conflict within the final phase of the Lebanese Civil War

- Part of the Lebanese Civil War
Date	1978–1991
Location	Lebanon
Result	Tactically inconclusive: Syrian occupation of Northern and Eastern Lebanon until 2005; Lebanese Army loyal to Aoun surrender to Syrian Army.; Lebanese Forces reliniquish its military arsenal to Hrawi's pro-Syrian Lebanese Government and disbands as a militia.; Aoun forced into exile and Geagea imprisoned soon after.

Belligerents
Lebanese Forces; Kataeb Regulatory Forces; Tigers Militia; Al-Tanzim; Guardians of the Cedars; Lebanese Youth Movement; Tyous Team of Commandos; South Lebanon Army; Supported by: Israel (until 1982; Israel only continued supporting the South Lebanon Army.); Iraq (1986–1991); Lebanese Front (until its dissolution in 1986); (Palestine) PLO (1986-1991; supported the Lebanese Forces after Geagea's coup.)	Marada Brigade; Free Tigers (1980-1981); LFEC (1986–1991); Eagles of the Whirlwind; Popular Guard; Pro-Hrawi Faction of the Lebanese Army (1989–1991); Supported by: Syria; FPNP (1976-1982); LNM (1978–1982); LNRF (1982–1991); (Palestine) PNSF (1985-1991)	Pro-Aoun Faction of the Lebanese Army (1989–1991); Supported by: Iraq (1989–1991)

Commanders and leaders
Bachir Gemayel †; Samir Geagea; Fadi Frem; Fouad Abou Nader; Elie Hobeika (1978–1985); Fouad Malek; Hanna Atik; Boutros Khawand; Pierre Gemayel # Amine Gemayel; Karim Pakradouni; Camille Chamoun # Dany Chamoun †; Dory Chamoun; Saad Haddad # Antoine Lahad; Aql Hashem	Suleiman Frangieh; Tony Frangieh †; Robert Frangieh; Suleiman Frangieh Jr.; Elias el-Hannouche; Elie Hobeika (1986–1991); Asaad Hardan; Georges Hawi; Elias Atallah; Elias Hrawi; Émile Lahoud; Elie Ferzli	Michel Aoun; Edgar Maalouf; Issam Abou Jamra

Inter-Christian conflicts in Lebanon were sub-conflicts between Christian or secular militias but heavily composed of Christians during the Lebanese Civil War. It involves Lebanese nationalist Christian forces against pro-Syrian right-wing Christian forces, secular and left-wing Christian forces.

== History ==
In 1977, relations within the Lebanese Front became strained between the Lebanese Phalanges and its close allies in the Marada Movement. This follows a decision by the Phalanges to try to ally with Israel, which the Maradas, long-time allies of Syria and anti-Zionists, categorically refuse.

It was then that regular clashes between the phalanges of Bachir Gemayel and the Marada Brigade were reported. This separation within the Lebanese Front poisons relations with former allies, notably the Kataeb, who try to encroach on the areas held by the maradas, which will lead to the death of Joud al-Bayeh, assassinated by several maradas, and will lead to in June of that same year, 1978, a FL raid on Zghorta and Ehden, strongholds of the Marada. The initial plan, ordered by Bashir Gemayel, was to arrest those who had murdered al-Bayeh. It was known that they were hiding in Frangié's summer residence in Ehden, but apparently degenerated in the heat of the moment, Tony Frangieh, his wife Vera and his daughter Jihane as well as 35 people were killed during this surprise attack. against 10 FL fighters. This event is known as the Ehden massacre.

This massacre prompted the maradas and the Frangieh family to ally themselves with the Lebanese enemies of the Lebanese Phalanges, notably the Lebanese National Movement. In retaliation, around a hundred Phalangists were massacred by the maradas in the following days and the others forced to flee or hide, another intervention led to the Qaa massacre, carried out by the Syrian armed forces on the orders of Rifaat al-Assad, with the aim of avenging Tony Frangieh.

During the same period, Bachir Gemayel tried to forcefully integrate the Christian militias into the Lebanese Forces (LF) by abolishing the old militias. As a result, this policy led to inter-Christian massacres until 1980, when Dany Chamoun's Tiger Militia was forcibly integrated into the LF. This also gave rise to the Free Tigers, who did not accept integration within the LF. The Free Tigers repeatedly attacked American representations in Lebanon to discredit the LF and were protected by the Syrian army.

At the same time, the organization of the Eagles of the Whirlwind (composed of many Orthodox and Maronite Christians with a strong Shiite Muslim component) linked to the secular Syrian Social Nationalist Party (SSNP) was organized following the invasion of Lebanon by the Israeli troops via the south of the country. It is at this precise moment that the Lebanese National Resistance Front replaces the Lebanese National Movement, of which the SSNP and then the Marada Brigade will integrate.

The September 14, 1982 Habib Shartouni, a pro-Syrian social-nationalist activist of the Maronite faith, detonated his homemade bomb located in his sister's apartment, killing Bachir Gemayel and 25 other Phalangists. The motive for the attack was the open collaboration between the Lebanese Phalanges and Israel.

Subsequently, the Lebanese Phalanges were led by Fadi Frem then by Fouad Abou Nader between 1982 and 1985, the forces were generally unified, until the ousting of Abou Nader and the taking of office of Elie Hobeika. On March 12, 1985, Samir Geagea, Elie Hobeika and Karim Pakradouni rebelled against the command of Abu Nader, apparently to return the Lebanese Forces to their original path. Elie Hobeika then takes charge of the FL. However, relations with Samir Geagea became strained, Hobeika moved closer to the Syrians and ended up signing a tripartite agreement sponsored by Syria and aimed at ending the Lebanese civil war.

In December 1985, Hobeika signed on behalf of the LF an agreement with the Syrian government, the Druze Progressive Socialist Party (PSP) led by Walid Jumblatt and the Shiite Muslim Amal movement led by Nabih Berri, known as the Tripartite Agreement. One of the cornerstones of the agreement was the dismantling of Lebanese militias of all factions. He also planned to initiate political changes that would end sectarian domination over the Lebanese parliament and army.

Within the LF, there has been dispute over whether to maintain ties with Israel and how to respond to Syrian-sponsored negotiations to end the fighting. Hobeika was opposed to retaining existing ties with Israel. In October 1985, while negotiations were underway, skirmishes took place between Geagea's supporters and Hobeika's supporters, where Hobeika's supporters attempted to bribe Geagea's supporters to betray Geagea. Samir Geagea and President Amine Gemayel decided not to accept the tripartite agreement and Geagea's LF attacked Hobeika's supporters, with the aim of carrying out an internal coup within the LF in favor. What they managed to do in January 1986 with the expulsion of Hobeika and the creation of the dissident formation of the Lebanese Forces – Executive Command which allied itself with the Syrian armed forces.
