= Zgharta Liberation Army =

Marada Movement branch in the Lebanese Civil War

Marada Brigade/Zgharta Liberation Army جيش التحرير الزغرتاوي/لواء المردة
- Flag of the Marada Brigade/Zgharta Liberation Army (1967–1991)
- Leaders: Suleiman Frangieh; Tony Frangieh †; Robert Frangieh; Suleiman Frangieh Jr.
- Dates active: 1967 – 1991
- Headquarters: Zgharta
- Active regions: Northern Lebanon
- Ideology: Lebanese nationalism; Christian democracy; Pro-Syria
- Political position: Right-wing
- Size: 3,500 fighters
- Part of: Marada Movement; Lebanese Front (until 1978); Lebanese National Salvation Front
- Wars: Lebanese Civil War

The Zgharta Liberation Army – ZLA (Arabic: جيش تحرير زغرتا, romanized: Jayish Tahrir Zaghrita), also known as Zghartawi Liberation Army, was the paramilitary branch of the Lebanese Marada Movement during the Lebanese Civil War. The militia was formed in the late 1960s by the future President of Lebanon and za'im Suleiman Frangieh as the Marada Brigade (also translated as Mardaite Brigade (Arabic: Liwa' al-Marada) and was initially led by Suleiman Franjieh's son, Tony Frangieh, who held the command until his death in the June 1978 Ehden massacre. The ZLA operated mainly out of Tripoli and Zgharta, but it also fought in Beirut, Bsharri and Ehden, where they clashed with various Palestine Liberation Organization (PLO) guerrilla factions and their allied leftist Muslim militias of the Lebanese National Movement (LNM), as well as the rival Christian Kataeb Regulatory Forces (KRF) militia and its successor, the Lebanese Forces (LF).

== Origins ==
The Al-Marada's military wing was secretly formed in 1967, and at the outbreak of the war in April 1975, its fighters numbered just 700–800 men armed with obsolete firearms acquired on the black market. They first came to light on 17 August 1970 in Beirut, when Tony Frangieh forced his way into the Parliament House leading a group of armed militiamen in order to secure his father's election to the Presidency – an illegal move that the Lebanese official authorities proved powerless to prevent.

== Political beliefs ==
Often described as a Mafia-style gangster organization rather than a true political party, the Al-Marada/ZLA seems to have never devised a coherent program or adhered to a particular ideology. Although conservative in outlook, sharing with the other right-wing Christian parties similar viewpoints regarding the Palestine Liberation Organization's (PLO) military presence in Lebanon and the preservation of the pre-war Christian-dominated political status quo, they were generally regarded as a corps of feudal retainers infamous for their brutality and corruption.

== Military structure and organization ==
Structured along semi-conventional lines into mechanized infantry, 'commando', signals, medical and military police branches, the ZLA had a distinct regional orientation, since its military HQ was established at the small town of Ehden near Zgharta, where the latter residents spend the summer. While their membership and command structure was predominantly Maronite, they did included a number of Greek-Catholics and Greek-Orthodox into their ranks. They initially allied themselves with the other Christian rightist parties' militias – Kataeb Regulatory Forces (KRF), Tigers Militia, Guardians of the Cedars (GoC), Al-Tanzim, Lebanese Youth Movement (LYM), and Tyous Team of Commandos (TTC) –, operating mainly in and out of Tripoli, and other areas of northern Lebanon, being engaged mostly in fighting local Muslim militias, but also fought in East Beirut. Thanks to the secret support provided by the Lebanese Army, by January 1976 the Frangieh-controlled militia ranks had swollen to 2,400 troops, a total comprising 800 full-time fighters and 1,500 irregulars. At its height in the late 1970s, the Al-Marada mustered some 3,500 men and women equipped with modern small-arms.

== List of Marada military commanders ==
- Tony Frangieh (1967–1978)
- Robert Frangieh (1978–1982)
- Suleiman Frangieh Jr. (1982–1990)

== Administrative organization and illegal activities ==
The Frangieh clan established in 1978 their own fief in the northern Lebanon, the so-called 'Northern Canton', which comprised the districts of Tripoli, Koura, Zgharta, Bsharri and parts of Batroun. The Canton was run by the Al-Marada's own civil administration of 80 public servants, who were also entrusted of running the militia's own television and radio service, "The Voice of the Marada" (Arabic: عزة صوت المرادة | Iza'at Sawt al-Marada) or "La Voix des Maradah" in French, by hijacking the television and radio signals emitted by the government-owned station at Fih in the Koura District, sending pirate broadcasts.

Initially funded by Suleiman Frangieh's own personal fortune, the Al-Marada/ZLA also resorted to racketeering, with additional revenues being generated by the illegal ports of Chekka – Lebanon's industrial hub at the time – and Selaata, both located in the Batroun District, which were used for contraband of arms, agricultural goods and industrial products, drug-trafficking, and barratry. They also levied tolls on the transit trade of agricultural products and other goods at a number of in-land checkpoints, such as Madfoun in the Batroun District.

== The ZLA in the Lebanese Civil War ==
=== Early stages and expansion 1975–78 ===
The small ZLA entered the civil war only in July 1975, in response to a series of attacks in the Sunni Muslim-dominated northern port city of Tripoli on shops and offices owned by Christians from Zgharta by local Muslim militias. On 28 August 1975, the ZLA clashed again at Tripoli with the local Sunni militias, but also at Zahlé with the local Greek-Catholic Zahliote Group (ZG) militia, despite the intervention of Lebanese Army troops in a vain attempt to curb the fighting. In October that year, ZLA militiamen were heavily committed in the Battle of the Hotels in Beirut, though later on 14 January 1976 they were rushed to defend Zgharta, which was besieged by PLO – Lebanese National Movement (LNM) forces in retaliation for the fall of the Palestinian refugee camp of Dbayeh in the hands of the Lebanese Front's Christian militias earlier that same day. Deployed again to Beirut in March 1976, they assisted the hard-pressed Republican Guard battalion in the defense of the Presidential Palace in the Baabda District from a two-pronged combined PLO – LNM – Lebanese Arab Army (LAA) assault, though prior to the attack President Suleiman Frangieh had decamped to the safety of Zouk Mikael, near Jounieh, and later to Kfour in the Keserwan District.

Despite having joined in January 1976 the Lebanese Front alliance that gathered the main rightist Christian parties and their militias, the Frangiehs close ties to Syria (Suleiman was a personal friend of Syrian President Hafez al-Assad), along with their bitter political squabbling with the Gemayel clan – leaders of the Kataeb Party or 'Phalange' – and their disagreements with the other Christian leaders over their tactical alliance with Israel, prompted them to break from the Lebanese Front in 1977, an act that would ultimately led to the tragic events of the following year.

=== The later years 1979–1990 ===
On June 7, 1978, six Marada militiamen assassinated the Kataeb party leader Joud el Bayeh who represented the party in Zgharta and wanted to open an office in the region. This would bring about retaliation as the Lebanese Forces would respond with an attack on Ehden where Tony Frangieh commanded his militia from. After Tony Frangieh was killed in the Ehden massacre perpetrated by the Lebanese Forces (LF) in June 1978, he was replaced in the militia's command by his younger brother Robert Frangieh, later succeeded by his nephew Suleiman Frangieh Jr. in 1982.

In the months immediately after the Ehden killings, the Frangiehs were not only able to prevent the ZLA from being totally destroyed or absorbed into the Lebanese Forces, but also succeeded in ruthlessly driving the latter out of the Koura District by the end of the 1970s, kidnapping or slaughtering nearly 100 Phalange' members and forcing the remaining 25,000 to either flee the region or go underground. It has also been suspected that the Al-Marada/ZLA were behind the assassinations of Bashir Gemayel's infant daughter and bodyguards by a car bomb explosion in February 1979 and later of Bashir himself in September 1982, although the degree of involvement of the Zgharta-based militia on any of these attacks remains unclear. After 1978, the Frangiehs switched their allegiance to the LNM camp and then to Syria, even lending their support to Syrian Army units at east Beirut against the Christian militias and the Army of Free Lebanon (AFL) during the Hundred Days' War. They joined in July 1983 the Lebanese National Salvation Front (LNSF), subsequently supporting in 1988–1990 the Syrian-sponsored Taif Agreement and the parliament-based provisional government of Sunni Prime-Minister Selim Al-Hoss against General Michel Aoun's Maronite-dominated military interim government.

Pushed to the sidelines for the rest of the civil war, the Al-Marada/ZLA was able to remain active thanks to Syrian support and although its numbers dwindled to 1,600 fighters by the mid-1980s, the Al-Marada managed to hold on to the 'Northern Canton'. On July 11, 1984, the Al-Marada/ZLA clashed with the Syrian Social Nationalist Party (SSNP) militia forces for the control of the Christian villages of Kousba, Kfaraakka, Bsarma, Dahr-al-Ain and several others in the Koura District, with the ZLA eventually managing to drive out the SSNP and assert their dominance over the entire region until the end of the war. It was also alleged that they received the tacit backing from a contingent of unspecified number from the 1,700 men-strong Lebanese Army's Seventh Brigade stationed at Byblos, being regarded as loyal to former president Suleiman Frangieh.

== Controversy ==
Ruthless fighters with a reputation for racketeering and brutality, the Marada themselves were not above committing sectarian violence against other Christians (and not just Muslims), a trait they manifested in the early years of the civil war.

Amid tensions in the North between the Kataeb and Marada parties when the former tried to expand their power in the region, ZLA/Marada militiamen assassinated Joud el Bayeh, a Kataeb leader in Zgharta, which ignited the Ehden massacre. To seek revenge for the Ehden massacre, on 28 June 1978, ZLA militiamen captured and killed 26 Kataeb Regulatory Forces members in the villages of Qaa and Ras Baalbek.

They also disguised themselves as Kataeb militiamen in a false flag operation and massacred 13 Kataeb members in Chmout on 22 April 1979, being tipped off about the gathering of the victims by the Syrians.

The ZLA/Marada militia destroyed the residence of Greek Orthodox MP Fouad Ghosn at the town of Kousba, Koura district in retaliation after he voted for Bachir Gemayel during the 1982 Lebanese presidential election.

On 2 May 1987, a ZLA unit called Marada 3/400 set up an ambush meant to kill Bahaa Douaihy and Roumanos Douaihy amid the long-running Frangieh and Douaihy clans feud.

== Disbandment ==
Upon the end of the war in October 1990, Al-Marada/ZLA militia forces operating in Beirut and the 'Northern Canton' were ordered by the Lebanese Government on March 28, 1991 to disband and surrender their heavy weaponry by April 30 as stipulated by the Taif Agreement. Disbanded in the early 1990s as a military force, they later re-emerged as a legal political organization, the Marada Movement (Arabic: تيار المردة | Tayyar al-Marada). The ZLA is no longer active.

== Weapons and equipment ==
Prior to the war, the ZLA militia initially received covert support from the Lebanese Army, who besides providing training, weapons and ammunition, also lent to the ZLA sophisticated mobile communications equipment. Additional weapons, vehicles, and other non-lethal equipment were procured on the international black market or drawn from Lebanese Armed Forces (LAF) reserves and Internal Security Forces (ISF) police stations. After June 1978, they were financed and armed mainly by Syria.

=== Infantry weapons ===
Al-Marada/ZLA militiamen were provided with a variety of small-arms, including Lee–Enfield SMLE Mk III and MAS-36 bolt-action rifles, MAS-49, M1 Garand (or its Italian-produced copy, the Beretta Model 1952), M14 and SKS semi-automatic rifles, plus MAT-49 and Heckler & Koch MP5 submachine guns. Assault rifles and carbines consisted of M16A1, FN FAL, Heckler & Koch G3, Vz. 58, AK-47 and AKM assault rifles (other variants included the Zastava M70, Zastava M80, and former East German MPi-KMS-72 assault rifles). Shotguns consisted of Winchester Model 1200, Franchi SPAS-12, and Franchi SPAS-15 semi-automatic models. Sniper rifles were also used, and models comprised the Dragunov SVD-63, Tabuk, Zastava M76/M78 and SSG 82. Handguns included MAB PA-15 pistols, FN P35, SIG Sauer P220 and Glock 19 pistols.

Squad weapons consisted of Chatellerault FM Mle 1924/29, Bren Mk. I .303 (7.7mm), FN MAG, Rheinmetall MG 3, VZ 59, Zastava M77, and PK/PKM (variants included the Chinese Type 80 and the Yugoslav Zastava M84) light machine guns. Heavier Browning M2HB .50 Cal, DShKM, Type 77 and NSV (or its Yugoslav variant, the Zastava M87) machine guns were employed as platoon and company weapons, but could also be found mounted on APCs and technicals.

Portable anti-tank weapons and guided missile systems were also widely employed, comprising RPG-7 and M80 Zolja anti-tank rocket launchers, M2 Carl Gustaf 84 mm and M67 90 mm anti-tank recoilless rifles, and MILAN and BGM-71 TOW anti-tank missiles. Crew-served and indirect fire weapons included L16 81mm mortars, plus SPG-9 73 mm, B-10 82 mm, M40 106 mm and L6 Wombat 120 mm recoilless rifles (often mounted on technicals).

=== Vehicles ===
The Al-Marada/ZLA fielded since January 1976 a mechanized corps made of ex-Lebanese Army M113 armored personnel carriers and gun trucks or 'Technicals'. The latter consisted of commandeered Jeep CJ-5 and Jeep CJ-8 (civilian versions of the Willys M38A1 MD jeep), Land-Rover series II–III, Santana Series III (Spanish-produced version of the Land-Rover series III), Toyota Land Cruiser (J40), Toyota Land Cruiser (J44), Dodge Power Wagon W200, Dodge D series (3rd generation), GMC Sierra Custom K25/K30, Chevrolet C-10/C-15 Cheyenne and Chevrolet C-20 Scottsdale light pickup trucks armed with heavy machine guns, recoilless rifles and anti-aircraft autocannons. For logistical support, the ZLA relied on Range Rover first generation Sport utility vehicles, Toyota Land Cruiser (J42) hardtop light pickups, Chevrolet C-50 medium-duty, Dodge F600 medium-duty and GMC C4500 medium-duty trucks, and GMC C7500 heavy-duty cargo trucks.

=== Artillery ===
Yugoslav Zastava M55 20mm, Soviet ZPU (ZPU-1, ZPU-2, ZPU-4) 14.5mm, and ZU-23-2 23mm AA autocannons (mostly mounted on technicals and heavier transport trucks) were employed in both air defense and direct fire support roles. These light Anti-Aircraft pieces were either seized from Lebanese Army stocks, acquired on the black market or provided by Syria.

=== Naval craft ===
They also maintained a small 'naval' branch equipped with some Zodiac rubber inflatable boats and converted civilian fishing craft armed with heavy machine guns and anti-aircraft autocannons, being used as a shock force for both military and barratry operations.

== See also ==
- Army of Free Lebanon
- Ehden massacre
- Kataeb Regulatory Forces
- Lebanese Civil War
- Lebanese Forces
- Lebanese National Salvation Front
- List of weapons of the Lebanese Civil War
- Marada Movement
- Najjadeh Party
- Zahliote Group
- 7th Infantry Brigade (Lebanon)

== Bibliography ==
- A.E. Sawan and Pierre Jabbour, Burden of Trust: The true story of the Commander of the SADM Unit, Independently Published, 2020. ISBN 9798664183597
- Bassil A. Mardelli, Middle East Perspectives: From Lebanon (1968–1988), iUniverse, 2012. ISBN 978-1-4759-0672-1 –
- Barry Rubin (editor), Lebanon: Liberation, Conflict, and Crisis, Middle East in Focus, Palgrave Macmillan, London 2009. ISBN 978-1-349-37326-0 –
- Claire Hoy and Victor Ostrovsky, By Way of Deception: The Making and Unmaking of a Mossad Officer, St. Martin's Press, New York 1990. ISBN 0-9717595-0-2
- Chris McNab, The SVD Dragunov Rifle, Weapon series 87, Osprey Publishing Ltd, Oxford 2023. ISBN 9781472855961
- Dan Bavly & Eliahu Salpeter, Fire in Beirut: Israel's War in Lebanon with the PLO, Stein & Day, New York 1984. ISBN 978-0-8128-2924-2
- Denise Ammoun, Histoire du Liban contemporain: Tome 2 1943–1990, Éditions Fayard, Paris 2005. ISBN 978-2-213-61521-9 (in French) –
- Edgar O'Ballance, Civil War in Lebanon, 1975–92, Palgrave Macmillan, London 1998. ISBN 0-333-72975-7
- Farid El-Khazen, The Breakdown of the State in Lebanon 1967–1976, I.B. Tauris, London 2000. ISBN 0-674-08105-6 –
- Fawwaz Traboulsi, Identités et solidarités croisées dans les conflits du Liban contemporain; Chapitre 12: L'économie politique des milices: le phénomène mafieux, Thèse de Doctorat d'Histoire – 1993, Université de Paris VIII, 2007 (in French) –
- Itamar Rabinovich, The war for Lebanon, 1970-1985, Cornell University Press, Ithaca and London 1989 (revised edition). ISBN 978-0-8014-9313-3 –
- Leigh Neville, Technicals: Non-Standard Tactical Vehicles from the Great Toyota War to modern Special Forces, New Vanguard series 257, Osprey Publishing Ltd, Oxford 2018. ISBN 978-1472822512
- Matthew S. Gordon, The Gemayels (World Leaders Past & Present), Chelsea House Publishers, New York 1988. ISBN 1-55546-834-9
- Naomi Joy Weinberger, Syrian Intervention in Lebanon: The 1975–76 Civil War, Oxford University Press, Oxford 1986. ISBN 978-0195040104
- Oren Barak, The Lebanese Army – A National institution in a divided society, State University of New York Press, Albany 2009. ISBN 978-0-7914-9345-8 –
- Paul Jureidini, R. D. McLaurin, and James Price, Military operations in selected Lebanese built-up areas, 1975–1978, Aberdeen, MD: U.S. Army Human Engineering Laboratory, Aberdeen Proving Ground, Technical Memorandum 11-79, June 1979.
- Rex Brynen, Sanctuary and Survival: the PLO in Lebanon, Boulder: Westview Press, Oxford 1990. ISBN 0861871235 –
- Robert Fisk, Pity the Nation: Lebanon at War, London: Oxford University Press, (3rd ed. 2001). ISBN 0-19-280130-9 –
- Roger J. Azzam, Liban, L'instruction d'un crime – 30 ans de guerre, Cheminements, Paris 2005. ISBN 978-2-84478-368-4 (in French)
- Leroy Thompson, The G3 Battle Rifle, Weapon series 68, Osprey Publishing Ltd, Oxford 2019. ISBN 978-1472828620
- Jean Huon, Un Siècle d'Armement Mondial: Armes à feu d'infanterie de petit calibre, tome 4, Crépin-Leblond éditions, Chaumont 1981. ASIN B009GJSUTE (in French)
- Joseph Hokayem, L'armée libanaise pendant la guerre: un instrument du pouvoir du président de la République (1975–1985), Lulu.com, Beyrouth 2012. ISBN 9781291036602, (in French) –
- Samir Makdisi and Richard Sadaka, "The Lebanese Civil War, 1975–1990", American University of Beirut, Institute of Financial Economics, Lecture and Working Paper Series (2003 No.3), pp. 1–53. – Archived 2017-08-10 at the Wayback Machine
- Samer Kassis, 30 Years of Military Vehicles in Lebanon, Beirut: Elite Group, 2003. ISBN 9953-0-0705-5
- Samuel M. Katz, Lee E. Russel, and Ron Volstad, Armies in Lebanon 1982–84, Men-at-Arms series 165, Osprey Publishing Ltd, London 1985. ISBN 978-0-85045-602-8
- Thomas Collelo (ed.), Lebanon: a country study, Library of Congress, Federal Research Division, Headquarters, Department of the Army (DA Pam 550-24), Washington D.C., December 1987 (Third edition 1989). –
- Tom Najem and Roy C. Amore, Historical Dictionary of Lebanon, Second Edition, Historical Dictionaries of Asia, Oceania, and the Middle East, Rowman & Littlefield Publishers, Lanham, Boulder, New York & London 2021. ISBN 9781538120439, 1538120437
- Zachary Sex & Bassel Abi-Chahine, Modern Conflicts 2 – The Lebanese civil war from 1975–1991 and Beyond, Modern Conflicts Profile Guide Volume II, AK Interactive, 2021. EAN 8435568306073

=== Further reading ===
- Antoine J. Abraham, The Lebanon war, Greenwood Publishing Group, Westport, Connecticut 1996. ISBN 9780275953898, 0275953890
- Fawwaz Traboulsi, A History of Modern Lebanon: Second Edition, Pluto Press, London 2012. ISBN 978-0745332741
- Jean Sarkis, Histoire de la guerre du Liban, Presses Universitaires de France – PUF, Paris 1993. ISBN 978-2-13-045801-2 (in French)
- Jonathan Randall, The Tragedy of Lebanon: Christian Warlords, Israeli Adventurers, and American Bunglers, Just World Books, Charlottesville, Virginia 2012. ISBN 978-1-935982-16-6
- Marius Deeb, The Lebanese Civil War, Praeger Publishers Inc., New York 1980. ISBN 978-0030397011
- Richard Labévière, La Tuerie d'Ehden ou la malédiction des Arabes chrétiens, Éditions Fayard, Paris 2009. ISBN 978-2213643656, (in French)
- Samir Kassir, La Guerre du Liban: De la dissension nationale au conflit régional, Éditions Karthala/CERMOC, Paris 1994. ISBN 978-2865374991 (in French)
- Walid Khalidi, Conflict and Violence in Lebanon: Confrontation in the Middle East, Cambridge, MA: Center for International Affairs, Harvard University, 1983. ISBN 978-0876740378, 0876740379
- William W. Harris, Faces of Lebanon: Sects, Wars, and Global Extensions, Princeton Series on the Middle East, Markus Wiener Publishers, Princeton, New Jersey, 1997. ISBN 978-1558761155, 1-55876-115-2
