= 1968 Lebanese general election in Zgharta District =

Voting to elect three members of the Lebanese parliament took place in the Zgharta District in northern Lebanon in 1968, part of the national general election of that year. All of the seats of the constituency were earmarked for the Maronite community (for more information about the Lebanese election system, see Elections in Lebanon). Zgharta District had 35,099 eligible voters, out of whom 13,412 voted.

== Background ==
In the years preceding the election Zgharta had witnessed violent clashes between different Maronite families, conflicts that carried political overtones. In 1965 clashes erupted between the Douaihy and Karam families. In January 1967 the driver of parliamentarian Sam'an Douaihy was shot dead. This act provoked the declaration of Zgharta as a military zone, and soldiers and policemen poured into the area. Night curfew was issued.

Zgharta was the home turf of Maronite strongman Suleiman Frangieh, landlord and one of the most powerful politicians in the country. He had been appointed as Minister of Interior earlier the same year, with the task of overseeing the elections. The Frangieh family owned mulberry plantations in the area. Manifesting its political influence the clan founded an armed militia under their command in the same year, the Zgharta Liberation Army.

== Frangieh ticket ==
In the 1968 election Frangieh fielded a ticket with three candidates, headed by himself. His running mates were René Moawad and Father Sam'an Douaihy. All three were incumbent parliamentarians.

René Moawad was a parliamentarian affiliated with the Democratic Front. He had been elected to parliament from 1957 onwards. Professionally, he was a lawyer.

Once a foe of Frangieh, Father Sam'an Douaihy had joined forces with the local strongman ahead of the 1964 election. Douaihy was the first priest ever to be elected to the Lebanese parliament. He was a member of the National Liberal Party.

== The challenger ==
Only one man attempted to challenge the hegemony of Frangieh. As'ad Karam, running on an individual ticket, was a 27-year-old student of law at Saint Joseph University. He lacked electoral experience, but was son of former parliamentarian Youssef Salim Karam.

== Results ==
All three candidates on the Frangieh ticket were re-elected. Karam did however muster a significant portion of the votes, considering Frangieh's dominance over the political life of the constituency.

Candidate	Votes
Suleiman Frangieh	10,569
René Moawad	8,774
Sam'an Douaihy	8,164
As'ad Karam	5,027
