= Joud el Bayeh =

Lebanese politician

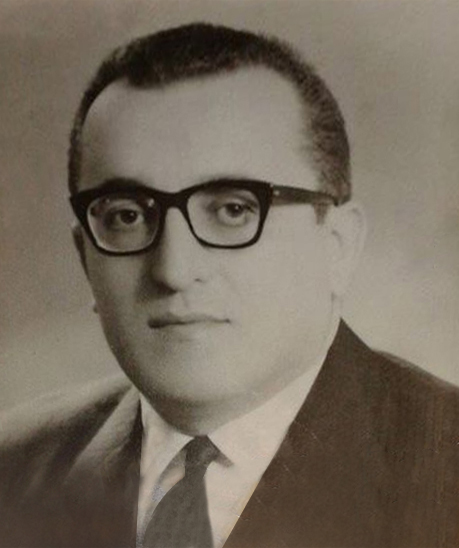
- Cause of death: Assassination
- Occupations: Bank director, political leader
- Political party: Kataeb

Joud el Bayeh (also spelled Jud Bayeh or Judd Bayeh, Arabic: جود البايع) was a Lebanese Kataeb party leader, responsible for the area of Zgharta in the North of Lebanon. His assassination on June 7, 1978 is believed to have triggered the Ehden Massacre. He was director of the Banque de la Méditerrannée (later BankMed) in Chekka, president of the municipal council of Kfardlakos (a village in Zgharta), and vice-president of the Zgharta region of the Kataeb. The Joud el Bayeh Foundation (مؤسسة جود البايع الخيرية) was created in his name.

== Assassination ==
Bayeh was born to a Maronite family. In 1978, tensions were high in the North between the Kataeb and Marada parties when the Kataeb tried to expend their power in the region. Bayeh attempted to open a Phalanges (Kataeb) office in Zgharta, but was killed on June 7, 1978 by six armed men sent by Tony Franjieh. On June 13, Kataeb leader Bashir Gemayel decided to strike back, killing Franjyeh, his wife Vera, their three-year-old daughter Jihane, and 30 other Marada bodyguards and aides; it came to be known as the Ehden Massacre. Franjyeh's son, Suleiman, survived as he was in Beirut during the massacre.

The raid was carried out by a force of 500 commandos. Commander Elie Hobeika was responsible for firing the deadly shots, and commander Samir Geagea was wounded and lost consciousness before getting into the house.

Gemayel initially tried to settle the problem by negotiations through Maronite Patriarch Antonios Khreich, but they were unsuccessful. He then decided to retaliate with a reprisal raid deep into Frangieh's mansion in Ehden. The original plan was to arrest those who had murdered Al Bayeh, who were known to be hiding in Frangieh's summer residence in Ehden.

== See also ==
- Ehden Massacre
- Kataeb Regulatory Forces
- Lebanese Civil War
- Lebanese Forces (Militia)
- Zgharta Liberation Army
