= Ehden massacre =

Massacre occurred during the Lebanese Civil War in June 1978

Ehden Massacre
- Part of the Lebanese Civil War and Inter-Christian conflicts in Lebanon
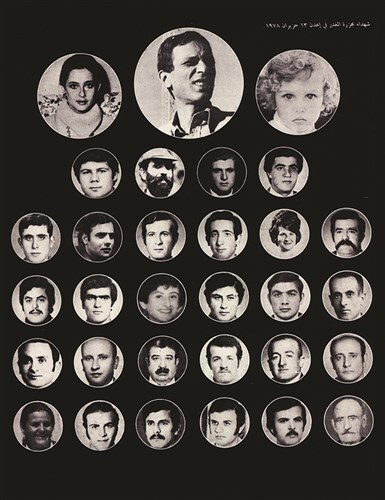
- Poster showing the victims of the Ehden massacre
- Location: 34°18′30″N 35°58′0″E; Ehden, Lebanon
- Date: 13 June 1978; 48 years ago 4 am (GMT+2)
- Target: Frangieh family
- Attack type: Massacre
- Deaths: Approximately 40 people
- Perpetrator: Kataeb Regulatory Forces
- Motive: Political rivalry, the murder of a Phalange leader, Joud Al Bayeh, and suspicion of collaboration by Suleiman Franjieh's Marada Brigade with the Syrian government

The Ehden massacre (Arabic: مجزرة إهدن, romanized: Majzarat Ehden) took place on 13 June 1978, during the 1975–1990 Lebanese Civil War. It was an inter-Christian attack between Maronite clans. A Kataeb militia attacked the summer house of the Frangieh family in Ehden leading to the death of over 40 people including Tony Frangieh and his family. Tony Frangieh was the eldest son of Sulaiman Frangieh, leader of the Marada Brigade and scion of one of the most powerful northern Maronite clans. He was 36 years old when he was killed.

== Background ==
Before the Lebanese Front was formed, many of the future leaders of the Lebanese Front organized their political parties into militias, most notably Camille Chamoun's 'Tigers', Pierre Gemayel's 'Kataeb Militia', and Suleiman Frangieh's 'Marada Brigade'.

Despite having joined in January 1976 the Lebanese Front alliance that gathered the main rightist Christian parties and their militias, the Frangiehs' close ties to Syria, along with their bitter political squabbling with the Gemayel clan – leaders of the Kataeb Party or 'Phalange' – and their disagreements with the other Christian leaders over their tactical alliance with Israel, prompted Frangieh to break from the Lebanese Front in 1977.

In 1978, tensions were high in Northern Lebanon between the Kataeb and Marada parties when the Kataeb tried to expand their power in the patriarchal seat of power of the Frangieh family. Following the killing of many Phalangist members, it was the killing of senior Phalangist member Joud El Bayeh that triggered the subsequent events. Joud El Bayeh was killed on 7 June 1978 by armed men sent by Tony Franjieh when he tried to open a political office in Zgharta.

The Lebanese Forces command in east Beirut, which was dominated by the Phalangists, decided to retaliate. The initial plan was to capture Tony Frangieh and force him to surrender the members of the Marada militia that killed the Phalangists. However, there was concern about the consequences of this move. Instead it was decided that the goal of the operation would be to capture the supposed members of the Marada militia that killed the Phalangists. The operation would be done on a Tuesday to assure Tony Frangieh would have left Ehden.

== Events ==
On 13 June 1978, Bachir Gemayel sent a force of 500 commandos to Ehden; however what Bachir Gemayel did not know was that Tony Frangieh hadn't left Ehden as his car wasn't running. As soon as the squadron arrived, bullets were flying over their heads and the squadron returned fire indiscriminately.

Tony Frangieh, his wife Vera Frangieh (née el Kordahi), their three-year-old daughter Jihane, and thirty other Marada bodyguards and aides who were at the mansion were killed in the raid. More than ten Phalangist gunmen were also killed in the attack.

“Even the family dog did not escape the carnage of that day”. Suleiman Frangieh claimed that the Phalangist gunmen forced Tony and his young wife Vera to watch the shooting of their infant daughter Jihane, then made him watch the murder of his wife before killing him.

Tony Frangieh's son, Suleiman Frangieh, Jr., escaped the massacre. He was not with his family in Ehden, but with his grandfather in east Beirut at that time.

== Aftermath ==
On 14 June 1978, a funeral ceremony was organized for the victims in Zgharta. Syrian troops stormed a village, Deir el Ahmar, nearly 15.5 miles southeast of Ehden to search for the perpetrators on the same day. Marada forces also carried out a series of revenge killings and kidnappings. In the following period the Phalange members in the area were displaced and nearly 100 of them were killed. On 28 June 1978, Marada allies responded with another massacre known as the Qaa massacre which resulted in the death of 26 Phalangists.

== Responses to allegations ==
The Marada Movement, headed by Suleiman Frangieh Jr. in 1982, accused the Lebanese Forces of carrying out the Ehden massacre. Bachir Gemayel argued that the massacre was a "social revolt against feudalism." In addition, the Phalangist Party declared that its forces carried out the attack since the Marada Brigade did not surrendered the killers of the Phalangist leader Joud El Bayeh.

Samir Geagea, who allegedly headed the Phalangist commando force responsible for the Ehden massacre admitted that he was among the "military squad" that was in charge of the Ehden "operation", but he denied taking part in the massacre, claiming that he was shot before the incident.

== Investigation and arrests ==
Hanna Shallita was arrested during a 1994 government crackdown on Samir Geagea's Lebanese Forces' commandos, who were accused of staging the Ehden massacre. Shallita was set free after paying an LL5 million bail in August 2002. However, no official investigation ever opened to find out who killed the Frangieh family and others. To date the killers have not been officially indicted.

When the file was reopened in 2002, Suleiman Frangieh Jr., son of Tony Frangieh, criticised the move, arguing that its aim was to show him manipulation of his slain family's blood for political ends. He further stated "the affair is a bygone for me, buried in the past."

=== Reconciliation ===
On 3 October 2008 reconciliation talks between the Lebanese Forces Party and the Marada Movement started under the auspices of the Maronite Church. After a decade of negotiations, on 14 November 2018, the Maronite Patriarch Bechara Boutros al-Rahi brokered a reconciliation agreement between the Lebanese Forces Party and the Marada Movement in Bkirki.

== Legacy ==
On 13 June 2008 OTV made a documentary about the massacre in which Youssef Frangieh revealed that he was the one who shot Samir Geagea. Later on 17 September of that same year, Youssef Frangieh was killed in a conflict between Lebanese Forces Party's and Marada Movement's members in Bsarma.

== Scholarly views ==
The travel writer and historian William Dalrymple reaches the conclusion that the Ehden massacre was remarkable and revealed more clearly than anything the medieval feudal reality behind the civilized twentieth-century veneer of Lebanese politics.

== Related publications ==
French journalist Richard Labeviere published a book entitled The Ehden Massacre. The Curse of Arab Christians (2009). The book provides alleged details of how Samir Geagea, the current leader of the Lebanese Forces Party, was chosen in 1978 by the Mossad to execute the Ehden massacre.

== See also ==
- Kataeb Regulatory Forces
- Lebanese Civil War
- Lebanese Forces
- Lebanese Forces (militia)
- Lebanese Front
- List of extrajudicial killings and political violence in Lebanon
- Marada Brigade
- Marada Movement
- Tigers Militia
