= Lebanese Front =

1976–1986 Christian Lebanese nationalist coalition

- الجبهة اللبنانية
- Unofficial Flag of the Lebanese Front
- Leaders: Main leaders: Pierre Gemayel; Camille Chamoun; Suleiman Franjieh (until 1978); Other leaders: Etienne Saqr; Obad Zouein; Bachir el-Khoury; Joseph Hanna; Aziz Wardeh; Farid Hamadeh
- Dates active: 1976–1990
- Groups: Main groups: Kataeb Party; Kataeb Regulatory Forces; National Liberal Party; Tigers Militia; Marada Movement (until 1978); Marada Brigade; Other groups: Guardians of the Cedars; Al-Tanzim; Lebanese Youth Movement; Tyous Team of Commandos; Zahliote Group; Vanguard of the Maani Army; Shuraya Party
- Headquarters: East Beirut
- Active regions: Beirut; Mount Lebanon; North Lebanon
- Ideology: Lebanese nationalism Anti-communism; Factions: Christian nationalism Falangism; Phoenicianism; Anti-Arabism; Anti-Palestinianism; Ultra-nationalism
- Political position: Right-wing; Far-right
- Size: 20,000 (1976)
- Wars: Lebanese Civil War

The Lebanese Front (Note: Arabic: الجبهة اللبنانية, romanized: al-Jabha al-Lubnaniyya) was a coalition of mainly right-wing Lebanese Nationalist parties and organizations formed in 1976 by majority Christian militia groups during the Lebanese Civil War. It was intended to act as a reaction force to the Lebanese National Movement (LNM) of Kamal Jumblatt and other left-wing allies. They played a significant role against Palestinian and Syrian military intervention and occupation of Lebanon during the Lebanese Civil War.

== History ==
The Lebanese Front was presided by the former president of Lebanon, Camille Chamoun, and its main participants were Pierre Gemayel, the founder and leader of the then-largest political party in Lebanon, the Kataeb Party, president Suleiman Frangieh, who had just finished his presidential years in office. It also included first class intellectuals, such as distinguished professor of philosophy and eminent diplomat Charles Malik who had been president of the United Nations General Assembly in 1958, and Fouad Frem al-Boustani, the president of the Lebanese University. The front also included religious figures such as Father Charbel Qassis, who was later replaced by Father Bulus Naaman the "head of the permanent congress of the Lebanese monastic orders". For a brief while the poet Said Aql was a member.

As soon as the war erupted in Lebanon, and before the Lebanese Front was formed, many of the future leaders of the Lebanese Front organized their political parties into militias, most notably Camille Chamoun's National Liberal Party, Pierre Gemayel's influential longstanding Kataeb Party, and Suleiman Frangieh's Marada Brigade. The number of men totalled around 18,000, which was a relatively large number given that the total population of Lebanon was less than three million.

However, the relations among the participants became tense mainly due to Frangieh's pro-Syrian approach. In addition, in 1978, Suleiman Frangieh's son Tony and his family were killed by armed Kataeb militiamen trying to kidnap him acting on orders from Bashir Gemayel, the son of Pierre Gemayel. The incident is known as the Ehden massacre. It was this turning point that prompted Suleiman Frangieh to resign from the Front.

In 1982, the Lebanese Front promoted Bachir Gemayel for the presidency. He was elected as president by the Lebanese parliament by 58 out of 62 votes from both Christians and Muslims, only to be assassinated three weeks later.

During the second half of the 1980s, most of the prominent leaders of the Lebanese Front died (Pierre Gemayel in 1984, both Chamoun and Charles Malik in 1987) and were replaced by other leaders like George Saadeh, Amin Gemayel and Karim Pakradouni. The Lebanese Front then lived for a short period only. Dany Chamoun, son of deceased Camille Chamoun, formed a new Lebanese Front, but a week after the end of the Lebanese Civil War in October 1990, Dany was assassinated and the Lebanese Front came to an end.

== See also ==
- Lebanese Civil War
- Lebanese Forces
- List of extrajudicial killings and political violence in Lebanon
- Lebanese National Movement
