= Zahliote Group =

Christian Lebanese militia active during the Lebanese Civil War

Zahliote Group – ZG مجموعة زحلوتي
- Leader: Aziz Wardeh
- Dates active: 1975–1978
- Headquarters: Zahlé
- Active regions: Zahlé (Beqaa Valley)
- Ideology: Lebanese nationalism; Anti-communism
- Political position: Right-wing
- Size: 500 fighters
- Part of: Lebanese Front; Lebanese Forces
- Wars: Lebanese Civil War

The Zahliote Group – ZG (Arabic: مجموعة زحلوتي | Majmueat Zhlouty) or Groupement Zahliote (GZ) in French, was a small Lebanese Christian militia raised in the Greek Catholic town of Zahlé in the Beqaa Valley, which fought in the Lebanese Civil War from 1975 to 1981.

== Structure and organization ==
The ZG was led by Aziz Wardeh, a wealthy banker and entrepreneur, who formed it in 1975 as a movement of middle-class businessmen who contested the rule of the local feudal clans, gathered in the so-called 'Seven Families' (Arabic: سبع عائلات | Sabe Eayilat) coalition headed by the za'im (political boss) Joseph Skaff. Wardeh's Zahliotes were estimated at about 100-500 fighters equipped with small-arms purchased on the black market or taken from Lebanese Army depots and Internal Security Forces (ISF) Police stations, backed by a few gun trucks or technicals (Willys M38A1 MD jeeps, CJ-5 Jeeps, Toyota Land Cruiser (J40) and Land-Rover series II-III pickups, Chevrolet C-10/C-15 Cheyenne light pickups and US M35A2 2½-ton 6x6 cargo trucks) armed with Heavy machine-guns, recoilless rifles and Anti-aircraft autocannons, controlled most of Zahlé until 1978, when they were finally absorbed into the Lebanese Forces.

== The Zahliotes in the Lebanese Civil War (1975-1981) ==
On 28 August 1975, The Zahliote Group militia clashed at Zahlé with the predominantly Maronite Zgharta Liberation Army (ZLA, a.k.a. the "Marada Brigade") militia led by Tony Frangieh, despite the intervention of Lebanese Army troops in a vain attempt to curb the fighting. Allied with the other rightist Christian factions in the Lebanese Front, the Zahliotes held their ground successfully against the PLO, the Leftist Muslim Lebanese National Movement (LNM) militias and Lebanese Arab Army (LAA) attempts to take Zahlé in early 1976. On 14 January that year, they defended their town when it was besieged by PLO–LNM joint forces in retaliation for the fall of the Palestinian refugee camp of Dbayeh in the hands of the Lebanese Front's Christian militias earlier that same day.

Although the ZG was integrated into the Lebanese Forces structure in 1978, its former members certainly played a role in the defence of their town on 20 December 1980, when the Free Tigers militia (a.k.a. the "Hannache Group") managed to seize by force the local National Liberal Party (NLP) offices and again in March 1981, when it was besieged by the Syrian Army during the Battle of Zahleh.

== See also ==
- Lebanese Arab Army
- Lebanese Civil War
- Lebanese Forces (militia)
- Lebanese Forces – Executive Command
- Lebanese Front
- Lebanese National Movement
- List of weapons of the Lebanese Civil War
- Tigers Militia
- Zgharta Liberation Army
