= Bassam Frangieh =

Scholar of Arabic literature and culture

Bassam Frangieh (born 1949, Arabic: بسام فرنجيه) is a Palestinian scholar of contemporary Arabic literature and culture. He is best known for his pedagogical innovations in the study of the Arabic language, as well as his translations of modern Arabic poets and novelists. He is a Professor of Arabic Language, Literature, and Poetry at Claremont McKenna College.

== Education and career ==
Frangieh was born in a refugee camp in Lebanon in 1949. His family, Palestinians who had owned an orange grove in Yaffa, had been relocated there due to the conflicts associated with the creation of the state of Israel. His family is distantly related to the famous Frangieh family of Lebanon, including former Lebanese president Suleiman Frangieh, but the Palestinian Frangieh family tree diverged from the Lebanese family tree several generations ago. Frangieh eventually moved to Syria to attend university, earning a B.A. from Damascus University in 1976. While in Syria, he earned fame as a boxing champion and professional soccer player. Frangieh attended graduate school in the United States, and received a Ph.D. in Arabic literature from Georgetown University in 1987. After receiving his doctorate, Frangieh taught Arabic at Georgetown for several years before accepting a position at Yale University. After his resignation from Yale in 2007, Frangieh joined Claremont McKenna College as a full-time Arabic professor and the head of the Arabic Department for the five Claremont Colleges while writing and researching new Arabic books. He is the head of the Middle East Studies Department.

== Bibliography ==
Frangieh is a prolific author in both Arabic and English on contemporary Arabic literature. This is a list of some of his most prominent books and articles.

=== Textbooks ===
- Arabic For Life: A Textbook for Beginning Arabic (2011)
- Anthology of Arabic Literature, Culture, and Thought (2005)

=== Translations ===
- Arabian Love Poems (1993), selected poems by Nizār Qabbānī
