= Qaa massacre =

Massacre occurred during the Lebanese Civil War in June 1978

Qaa Massacre
- Part of the Lebanese Civil War
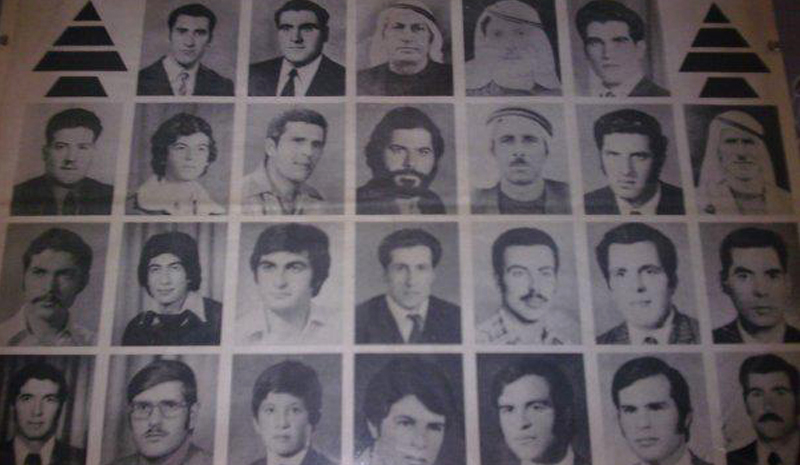
- Victims of the massacre
- Location: Qaa, Lebanon
- Date: 28 June 1978; 48 years ago
- Target: Kataeb and National Liberal Party Members
- Attack type: Massacre
- Deaths: 26 people
- Perpetrators: Marada Brigade; Defense Companies
- Motive: Revenge for the murder of Tony Frangieh

The Qaa massacre (Arabic: مجزرة القاع) took place on June 28, 1978, in which four villages in Baalbek District (Ras Baalbek, Qaa, Fakiha and Jdeide) were attacked in apparent retaliation for Ehden massacre.

The New York Times reported that the victims were believed to have taken part in the killing of 40 people two weeks earlier in the northern town of Ehden. The report quoted Camille Chamoun as saying that the attack on the four villages was by “non-Lebanese, non-civilians” and that the gunmen entered the villages with lists of names. Phalangist radio reported 40 people were kidnapped and 26 of them killed. The dead were reported to be members of the Phalangist Kataeb party and Chamoun's National Liberal Party.

== Background ==
Fifteen days earlier, Kataeb committed a massacre in Ehden, killing 40 people including Tony Frangieh.

== See also ==
- List of extrajudicial killings and political violence in Lebanon
