= Independent National Bloc =

Parliamentary bloc in the Lebanese parliament

Independent National Bloc (Arabic: التكتل الوطني المستقل) is a parliamentary bloc in the Lebanese parliament, formed in 2018 by Marada Movement, Dignity Movement, Farid Haykal Khazen and Moustafa El Husseini.

After the 2022 Lebanese general election, the Independent National Bloc includes Tony Frangieh, Farid Haykal-Khazen, William Tawk and Michel Murr.

After the 2022–2025 Lebanese presidential election, Michel Murr left the bloc.

== Election summary ==
Election	Seats	Change
2018	7 / 128 (5%)	▲4
2022	4 / 128 (3%)	▼3

== 2018–2022 session deputies ==
Name	Election Area	Political Affiliation	Sect
Tony Suleiman Frangieh	Zgharta	Marada Movement	Maronite
Estephan Douaihy	Zgharta	Marada Movement	Maronite
Fayez Ghosn	Koura	Marada Movement	Greek Orthodox
Faisal Karami	Tripoli	Dignity Movement	Sunni
Jihad Al Samad	Danniyeh	Dignity Movement	Sunni
Farid Haykal Khazen	Kesserwan	Independent	Maronite
Moustafa El Husseini	Jbeil	Independent	Shia

== 2022–2026 session deputies ==
Name	Election Area	Political Affiliation	Sect
Tony Suleiman Frangieh	Zgharta	Marada Movement	Maronite
William Gebran Tawk	Bsharri	Independent	Maronite
Farid Haykal Khazen	Kesserwan	Independent	Maronite
~~Michel Elias El Murr~~ Withdrew after the presidential election	~~Metn~~	~~Independent~~	~~Greek Orthodox~~

== See also ==
- List of members of the 2018–2022 Lebanese Parliament
- List of members of the 2022–2026 Lebanese Parliament

== Bloc allies ==
- Loyalty to the Resistance Bloc
- Amal Movement
