= Hamid Frangieh =

Lebanese politician

Hamid Bey Frangieh
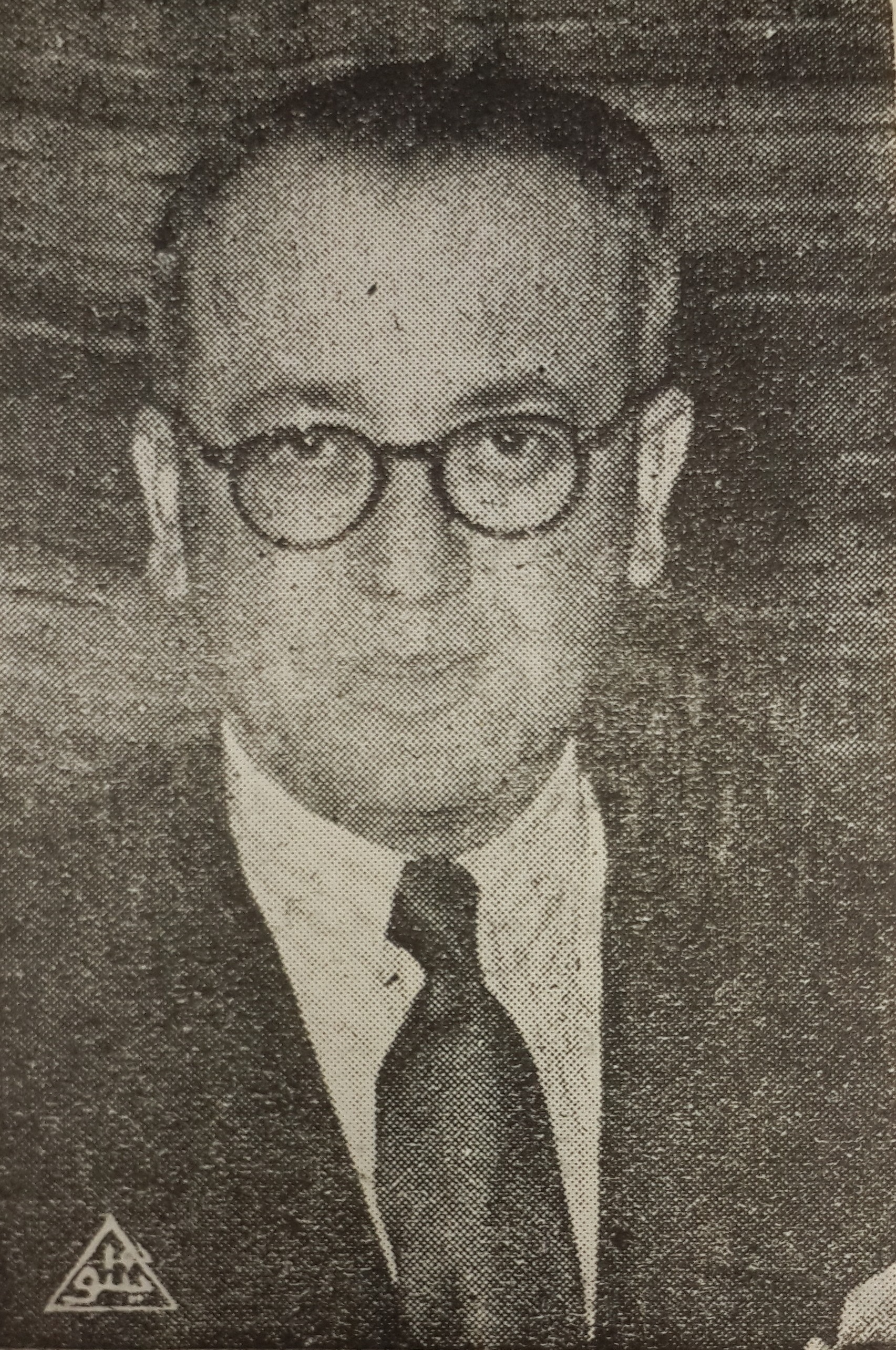
- Hamid Bey Frangieh in 1948

7th Foreign Minister of Lebanon
- In office 1955–1955
- Prime Minister: Sami El Solh
- Preceded by: Alfred Naccache
- Succeeded by: Salim Lahoud

2nd Finance Minister of Lebanon
- In office 3 July 1944 – 9 January 1945
- Prime Minister: Riad Al Solh
- Preceded by: Riad Al Solh
- Succeeded by: Abdul Hamid Karami

Personal details
- Born: 6 August 1907 Ehden, Mount Lebanon Mutasarrifate, Ottoman Empire
- Died: 5 September 1981 (aged 74)
- Party: Independent
- Children: 6, including Samir
- Relatives: Suleiman Frangieh (brother)

Hamid Frangieh (6 August 1907 – 5 September 1981) was a Lebanese member of the Parliament of Lebanon and held numerous ministerial positions in the Lebanese government. He was one of the Maronite leaders of Lebanon.

== Early life ==
Hamid was born in Ehden Lebanon, the son of politician Kabalan Suleimen Frangieh and Lamia Raffoul from Ejbeh Lebanon. The family had a long history of public service. Kabalan Frangieh was district governor of Ehden (1908–1913) and a member of the parliament (1929–1932). His grandfather, Suleiman Ghnatios Frangieh, was district governor of Ehden (1904–1908); and his brother Suleiman became President of Lebanon.

Hamid attended "Frères des Ecoles Chrétiennes" school in Tripoli, for his primary education, then to Aintoura for his secondary education. In 1930, he graduated in law from the Université de Saint-Joseph in Beirut.

His early career was both in the law and journalism, with Hamid becoming one of the cofounders and columnists of the Le Jour newspaper in 1933.

== Government career ==
Frangieh was elected as a member of Parliament for the first time in 1932 aged 25. In 1937 he became the sole member of the opposition in North Lebanon to be elected. He was elected again on a further five times in 1943, 1947, 1951, 1953 and 1957 before he withdrew from political life due to illness. He was instrumental in ensuring UNESCO's first world conference was held in Beirut.

During his tenure as a member of Parliament, he also held ministerial offices, including as follows:

- Minister of Finance (July 1944 - January 1945)
- Minister of Foreign Affairs and Minister of Education (1945 - 1949)
- Minister of Foreign Affairs and Emigration, resigned 2 months later due to ill health (1941, 1955)

== Personal life ==
In 1941 he married his cousin and they had six children: Kabalan, Samir, Nabil, Marie-Claude, Zeina and Liliane.
