= Tony Frangieh Jr. =

Lebanese politician

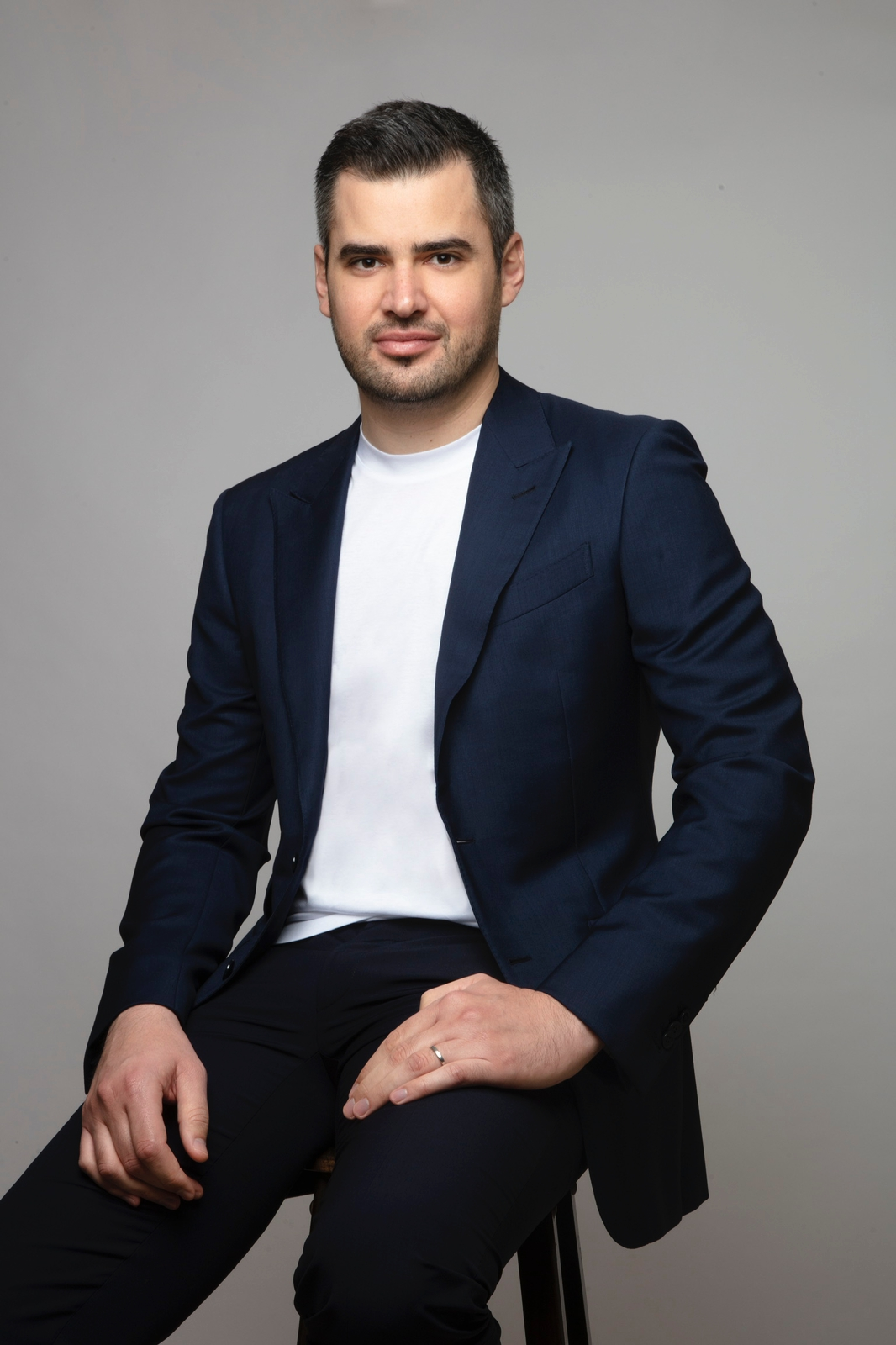
- Frangieh in 2022

Member of the Lebanese Parliament
- Incumbent
- Assumed office 15 May 2018
- Constituency: Zgharta (2018, 2022)

Personal details
- Born: 22 September 1987 (age 39) Zgharta, Lebanon
- Party: Marada Movement
- Spouse: Lynn Zeidan
- Children: Three Daughters
- Education: University of Balamand
- Occupation: Politician

Tony Frangieh (Arabic: طوني فرنجية; born 22 September 1987) is a Lebanese politician who serves as member of parliament since 2018. He is a member of the Marada Movement and the son of its leader, Suleiman Frangieh.

== Early life and family ==
Franjieh was born on 22 September 1987, in the town of Zgharta to the Maronite Christian Frangieh family. His father, Suleiman Frangieh Jr., is the head of the Marada Movement and was a former Lebanese MP. His mother is Marian Sarkis and has one brother and a half-sister. He holds a university degree in economics from the University of Balamand, and a master's degree in economics from the City University of London.

On 28 September 2019, MP Frangieh married Saida-born Lynn Zeidan in an open to all celebration attended by all the town. They both have 3 children.

== Career ==
Tony Frangieh was born into a popular political family of the Zgharta region. He became involved in the field of politics and contributed to the management of the Marada movement headed by his father, Suleiman Franjieh, where he worked on many internal projects in the movement, including those concerned with youth, students, unions, education and other issues. He had an active presence and participation in many political and diplomatic meetings.

He also represented the movement on many occasions outside Lebanon, including Australia in 2012 and Venezuela in 2015 with the aim of meeting with the Lebanese community in these countries. He sponsored a large number of activities specialized in public affairs and social services, and participated in more than 5,000 activities across Lebanon.

Tony Frangieh is expected to succeed his father as party and clan leader.

== See also ==
- Frangieh family
- Suleiman Frangieh (politician, born 1965)
- Marada Movement
