= National Salvation Front (Lebanon) =

The National Salvation Front was a Lebanese political alliance that was founded during the Lebanese Civil War in opposition to Amine Gemayel's government and the May 17 Agreement. It was considered the parliamentary wing of the Lebanese National Resistance Front militia.

== Background ==
With U.S. assistance, Israel and Lebanon reached an accord in May 1983, that set the stage to withdraw Israeli forces from Lebanon while letting them patrol a "security zone" together with the Lebanese Armed Forces. The agreement terminated the state of war between Israel and Lebanon that had lasted since the 1948 Arab–Israeli War and provided for a staged withdrawal of Israeli forces, on the condition of the establishment of a Lebanese Army "security zone" in South Lebanon along the border area. It contained numerous clauses detailing security cooperation between Lebanon and Israel designed to prevent the Palestine Liberation Organization (PLO) and other groups from infiltrating the border areas. This agreement was discussed in the Lebanese parliament in June 14 in which it was approved by 65 MPs and 2 members voted against. Those abstained were Rashid Karami and former president Suleiman Frangieh who were close allies to the Syrian regime. And one of those who objected was Walid Jumblatt, the leader of the Druze People's Liberation Army, due to the Lebanese Forces' presence in the Chouf and Aley regions in which they needed the assistance of the Syrian forces during conflict with the LF.

== Formation ==
On July 23, 1983, Walid Jumblatt announced that the National Salvation Front was formed in Baalbek and Ehden, headed by Franjieh, Karami and himself. The Lebanese Communist Party, the Organization for Communist Action and the Syrian Social Nationalist Party, who were members of the Lebanese National Movement which collapsed in the aftermath of the Israeli invasion of June 1982, joined the Front. And so did the Lebanese branch of the pro-Syria Ba'ath Party and the Arab Democratic Party. The political interests of the National Salvation Front did not deal with political or social reforms, but focused on the sole issue of the abrogation of the May 17 Agreement.

== Involvement in the Lebanese Civil War ==
=== Mountain War ===
Fighting between the Druze PLA and LF and between the Druze and LAF, intensified during the month of August. Intense Druze PLA artillery shelling forced the Beirut International Airport to close between 10 and 16 August, and the Druze PSP/PLA leadership made explicit their opposition to the deployment of Lebanese Army units in the Chouf District. The U.S. Marines compound came under further Druze PLA shell-fire on 28 August, this time killing two Marines, which led the Marines to retaliate with their own artillery, shelling the Druze positions in the Chouf District with 155mm high-explosive rounds. This incident marked the beginning of the shooting war for the U.S. military forces in Lebanon. Although President Gemayel accused Syria of being behind the Druze shelling and threatened to respond accordingly, artillery duels between the LAF and Druze militias continued sporadically until a ceasefire came in effect on late August.

== See also ==
- Lebanese National Resistance Front
- Walid Jumblatt
- Amine Gemayel
- Mountain War
