= Suleiman Frangieh (politician, born 1965) =

Lebanese politician

- سليمان فرنجية
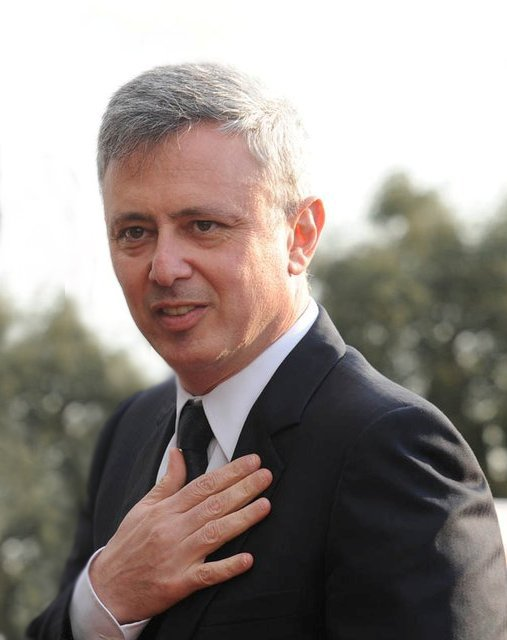

Leader of the Marada Movement
- Incumbent
- Assumed office 20 August 1990
- Preceded by: Robert Frangieh

Member of Lebanese Parliament
- In office 20 June 2009 – 15 May 2018
- Constituency: Zgharta
- In office 7 June 1991 – 20 June 2005
- Constituency: Zgharta

Minister of Interior and Municipalities
- In office 26 October 2004 – 19 April 2005
- Prime Minister: Omar Karami
- Preceded by: Elias Murr
- Succeeded by: Hassan Sabeh

Minister of Public Health
- In office 26 October 2000 – 26 October 2004
- Prime Minister: Rafic Hariri
- Preceded by: Karam Karam
- Succeeded by: Mohamad Jawad Khalifeh
- In office 7 November 1996 – 4 December 1998
- Prime Minister: Rafic Hariri
- Preceded by: Marwan Hamadeh
- Succeeded by: Karam Karam

Personal details
- Born: 18 October 1965 (age 60) Zgharta, Lebanon
- Party: Marada Movement
- Spouse: Rima Karkafi
- Children: 3
- Parent: Tony Frangieh (father)
- Relatives: Suleiman Frangieh (grandfather)
- Occupation: Politician

Suleiman Antoine Frangieh (Arabic: سليمان أنطوان فرنجية; born 18 October 1965) is a Lebanese politician. He is the incumbent leader of the Marada Movement, and a former Member of the Lebanese Parliament for the Maronite seat of Zgharta–Zawyie, in North Lebanon. Politically he is considered an ally of former Syrian president Bashar al-Assad. He was the primary candidate for Hezbollah's faction for the 2022–2025 Lebanese presidential election, before withdrawing. In June 2026 the US Government sanctioned Frangieh for his ties with Hezbollah.

== Early life ==
Suleiman was born in Zgharta, Lebanon on 18 October 1965 into the Frangieh family, a prominent Lebanese political family who claim descent from Franks that settled in Lebanon during the Crusades. He is the son of the late Tony Frangieh, who was assassinated in the Ehden massacre in 1978, and grandson of the former Lebanese President Suleiman Frangieh. Lebanese journalist and politician Samir Frangieh was Suleiman's cousin once removed.

=== Lebanese civil war ===
Suleiman Frangieh's grandfather brought him to Syria after the Ehden massacre, which was perpetrated by the rival Maronite Kataeb Party's militia forces. In Syria, Suleiman was taken under the wing of Bassel Assad, eldest son of then Syrian President Hafez al-Assad. His friendship with the Al Assad family has remained close since then.

Suleiman Frangieh's military career began when he was 17 years old. In 1982, he became leader of the Marada Brigades. The militia later disbanded to become a political group following the Taif Agreement. Marada began to participate in social, cultural, educational, health and political affairs.

== Political career ==
He was appointed to Parliament for the first time on 7 June 1991 to fill his late father's seat and was then the youngest Member of Parliament. He was subsequently elected for three successive terms in 1992, 1996 and 2000. Frangieh served as Minister of Health in the 1996 Rafic Hariri cabinet. Frangieh was allied with former Syrian President Bashar al-Assad.

Suleiman Frangieh joined mourners gathered in front of Beirut's city palace to pay his final respects to Rafic Hariri who was killed by a bomb on 14 February 2005. His presence made many uneasy, since it was his ministry that was overseeing the investigation into Hariri's assassination.

During the Lebanese Parliamentary Elections of 7 June 2009, Suleiman Frangieh was elected as a Member of Parliament for the seat of Zgharta-Zawyieh after he had lost that seat in the 2005 elections. He won the seat along with his two running partners Estephan Douaihy and Salim Bey Karam. Together, these three politicians, along with the addition of MP Emile Rahme, formed the 'Free and Unified Lebanon' bloc in the Lebanese Parliament.

In August 2012, Frangieh commented on the Syrian civil war stating that the pro-Assad coalition would win the war and gave his full support to the Syrian government. Frangieh also added that he opposes the "negative neutrality" which is "pretending to be neutral while arms are smuggled from Lebanon to Syria". He called the "negative neutrality" a "conspiring against Syria".

He did not run for re-election in the 2018 and 2022 General elections. His son, Tony, succeeded him in the Parliament.

Frangieh became a contender in the Lebanese presidential election to succeed Michel Aoun and to fill an ongoing presidential vacuum. He obtained his first vote on November 17 during the sixth session of presidential elections. Hezbollah and the Amal Movement have announced their endorsement for Suleiman Frangieh in the upcoming ballots. In parallel, an initiative led by independent MP Ghassan Skaff culminated in talks between opposition parties, taking advantage of the growing rift between the Free Patriotic Movement and Hezbollah and the warming of Syrian-Gulf diplomatic relations. With the support of Maronite Patriarch Bechara Boutros al-Rahi, it was announced in late May 2023 that the Lebanese Forces, the Kataeb, the FPM and the PSP had agreed to endorse the candidacy of IMF economist and former Minister of Finance Jihad Azour for the role of President On 14 June 2023 economist Jihad Azour received 60 votes, 51 votes for Suleiman Frangieh. Later, other candidates were proposed as an alternative to Frangieh by mediation officials, however, leaders of the main opposition Christian Blocs, Samir Geagea and Samy Gemayel, reacted with refusal to negotiate with Hezbollah unless they let go of their primary candidate Frangieh who is considered their preferred candidate.

On January 8, 2025, he announced he withdrawal from candidacy for the Lebanese presidency and his support to Army Commander General Joseph Aoun.

== Sanctions ==
On 18 June 2026, the US Government sanctioned Frangieh due to his ties to Hezbollah, claiming he was using them to interfere with the peace process and delay the disarmament of Hezbollah.

== Personal life ==
In 1983, at the age of 18, he married Marian Sarkis, and they had Tony (born 1987) and Basil (born 1992). They divorced in 2003.

Days after his divorce, he married media personality Rima Karakafi, and they had Vera (born 2007).

Party political offices
Preceded by Robert Frangieh	Leader of the Marada Movement; 1990–present	Incumbent
Political offices
Preceded by Elias Murr	Minister of Interior and Municipalities; 2004–2005	Succeeded by Hassan Sabeh
