= Kousba =

Village in Koura District, Lebanon

Kousba كوسبا
- Village
- Location within Lebanon
- Coordinates: 34°18′6″N 35°51′10″E
- Country: Lebanon
- Governorate: North Governorate
- District: Koura District
- Highest elevation: 500 m (1,600 ft)
- Lowest elevation: 450 m (1,480 ft)
- Time zone: UTC+2 (EET)
  - Summer (DST): UTC+3 (EEST)
- Dialing code: +961

Kousba (Arabic: كوسبا) is a village in the Koura District, in the Northern Governorate of Lebanon. Kousba has around 5,000 residents, most of which are Greek Orthodox.

== Etymology ==
According to the elderly residents of this town, the name Kousba comes from the word "hidden" because of how it lies between mountains.

== Geography ==
Kousba's surface is 6.02 square kilometers, with an altitude of 500 meters.

Kousba is situated 18 km south of Tripoli and 12 km east of Chekka. A main road that runs from Chekka to Bsharri (called "Chekka Arz Highway") passes through Kousba.

There are many landmarks in Kousba, including ancient historical monuments, touristic attractions, religious sites, sport clubs, teaching institutions and social clubs.

== Demographics ==
In 1953, Kousba's population was 1,732, making it the second most populous village in the Koura District after Amyoun. Its population has since increased to about 5,000 residents. Statistics from the 2004 municipal elections indicated that Kousba had 7,193 registered voters—of which 4,940 voted.

In 2014, Christians made up 94.96% of registered voters in Kousba. 79.10% of the voters were Greek Orthodox and 13.09% were Maronite Catholics.

== Economy ==
There are 23 companies in Kousba that have more than five employees.

== Education ==
There were 311 students enrolled in its two public schools in 2002.

== Human resources ==
=== Health ===
Kousba has one medical center but no hospitals.

== Families in Kousba ==
Abdullah, Andraous, Antoun, Atieh, Awad, Ayoub, Azar, Bchara, Braheem, Chehade, Dannawi, Fadil, Farah, Fayad, Ghazi, Gosen, Greij, Habib, Hakeem, Hanna, Haykal, Ibrahim, Isaac, Israel, Jabbour, Kamar, Kanaan, Kheir, El-Khoury, Manssour, Mitri, Moussa, Nahas, Namey, Nasr, Nassar, Rihana, Roumi, Saab, Saba, Saddic, Sarkis, Sarraf, Sassine, El-Tom, Wakeem, Yacoub, Younis, Youssef, Zeidan and El Zalameh.
