= Dahr-al-Ain =

Village in Koura District, Lebanon

Coordinates: 34.3917°N 35.8481°E

Dahr Al-Ain ضهر العين
- Village
- Location within Lebanon
- Country: Lebanon
- Governorate: North Governorate
- District: Koura District

Government

Area
  - Total: 144 km^{2} (56 sq mi)
- Elevation: 114 m (374 ft)

Population
  - Total: 62,352
  - Density: 443/km^{2} (1,150/sq mi)
- Time zone: UTC+2 (EET)
  - Summer (DST): UTC+3 (EEST)
- Dialing code: +961

Dahr-al-Ain (Arabic: ضهر العين, romanized: Ḍahr al-ʿAyn) is a in the Koura District of Lebanon, with a Maronite-majority population.

== Demographics ==
In 2014, Christians made up 98.39% of registered voters in Dahr-al-Ain. 70.43% of the voters were Maronite Catholics and 19.35% were Greek Orthodox.

== Murder case ==
It attracted media attention in May 2010 when two brothers, Tony and Nayef Saleh, were shot by Hanna al-Bersawi on May 28, apparently for political reasons only days before the municipal polls.
