= Frangieh family =

Frangieh (Arabic: فرنجية: "Franc", meaning "occidental" in Arabic), also spelled Frangié, Franjieh, or Franjiyeh, is a prominent Lebanese political family.

- Bassam Frangieh (born 1949), Palestinan scholar of contemporary Arabic literature and culture. Distant relative of the politicians
- Hamid Beik Frangieh (1907–1981), Lebanese politician, older brother of Lebanese President Suleiman
- Suleiman Frangieh (1910–1992), President (1970–1976)
- Tony Frangieh (1941–1978), son of Suleiman sr, militia leader during the Lebanese Civil War
- Samir Frangieh (1945–2017), Lebanese politician and journalist
- Suleiman Frangieh, Jr. (born 1965), son of Tony, current leader of the Marada Movement
- Lamitta Frangieh (born 1980), 1st runner-up at 2004 Miss Lebanon competition

== See also ==
- List of political families in Lebanon
