= Douaihy =

Noble family of Lebanon

Ancestral coat of arms of Douaihy Clan

The House of Douaihy (also "Al Douaihy" in some cases Doueihy, Douaihi, Doueihi, Dowaihi, Duayhe, Duwayhi', Dwaihy, Arabic: الدويهي, French: de Douai), is an important Levantine noble family of which can be traced up until the 7th century. The first prominent feudal northern Lebanese Maronite Sheikhs (Lords) to have governed Zgharta and Ehden, (Zgharta District) in northern Lebanon came from the Douaihy clan.

Throughout history, the Douaihys endowed the community with research, faith, commerce and art. The Douaihys are also a religious family, among whom are recognized four Patriarchs, seventeen Bishops, hundreds of monks and nuns, dating from the 14th century to the present day.

On January 26, 2006 the Congregation of Saints in the Vatican has proclaimed the beginning of the process for Patriarch Estephan El Douaihy’s canonization.

It is a large and well-rooted family in the lands of Ehden, Kadisha and Khazahia, where its roots combine with the history of the Maronites for at least one thousand years. The clan had a substantial presence in the Galilee prior to 1948, but its numbers have dwindled in the Holy Land in general since then, with most Palestinian clan members moving to Europe and South America, as well as Lebanon.

The Douaihy family lineage continues to contribute meaningfully on the national and international scene as professors, academics, artists, diplomats, police and army generals, healthcare representatives, parliament members and minister.The family slogan, known by many as "Ana la min?" (Who am I for?), is being upheld by the rightful heir of the family, Duks III, who carries the torch of this legacy.

== Origins ==
Genealogy in the Middle East, especially of Christian families in Syria, Lebanon and the Holy Land, is complicated and depends on oral traditions much more than written ones.

In the Middle Ages when Tripoli was governed by the Crusaders, a mixed people lived in the area, a result of the intermarriages between the Christians from Europe and the local Christians (Maronites, Melkites, etc.). It was not unusual for a Tripolitan to be of French origin (but of local Christian culture), married to a local Christian, with a Greek son-in-law and an Armenian or Syriac daughter-in-law.

To this day you can find many people of Crusader origin in Lebanon, the Holy Land, Jordan and Syria. The El Douaihy clan are descendants of the French who came from the northern French city of Douai, the capital of the ancient Frankish Duchy of Ostrevant (the arms of the Douai family are still used as a blason of Ostrevant). In the First Crusade, Count Anselme II De Ribemont d’Ostrevant was the “right hand” of Godfroi de Bouillon in the East, so one would assume that his progenitors were related to the De Ribemont d’Ostrevant family.

If Jeremiah Al-Amshiti had been one of the Douai clan, as Patriarch Estephan El Douaihy claimed, the family progenitors would have been “easternized” just after the First Crusade 1096 -1099. The Douaihy clan spread across the Levant, including to Syria and Palestine.

== See also ==
- List of political families in Lebanon
