= Bsarma =

Christian village in Koura District, Lebanon

Coordinates: 34°20′N 35°50′E

Bsarma بصرما
- Village
- Location within Lebanon
- Country: Lebanon
- Governorate: North
- District: Koura

Bsarma (Arabic: بصرما, romanized: Bṣarmā) is a Christian village in the Koura District of Lebanon. The population is Greek Orthodox and Maronite.

== Demographics ==
In 2014, Christians made up 99.01% of registered voters in Bsarma. 57.41% of the voters were Greek Orthodox and 39.60% were Maronite Catholics.
