= North Lebanon =

Northern region of Lebanon

North Lebanon شمال لبنان
- Region
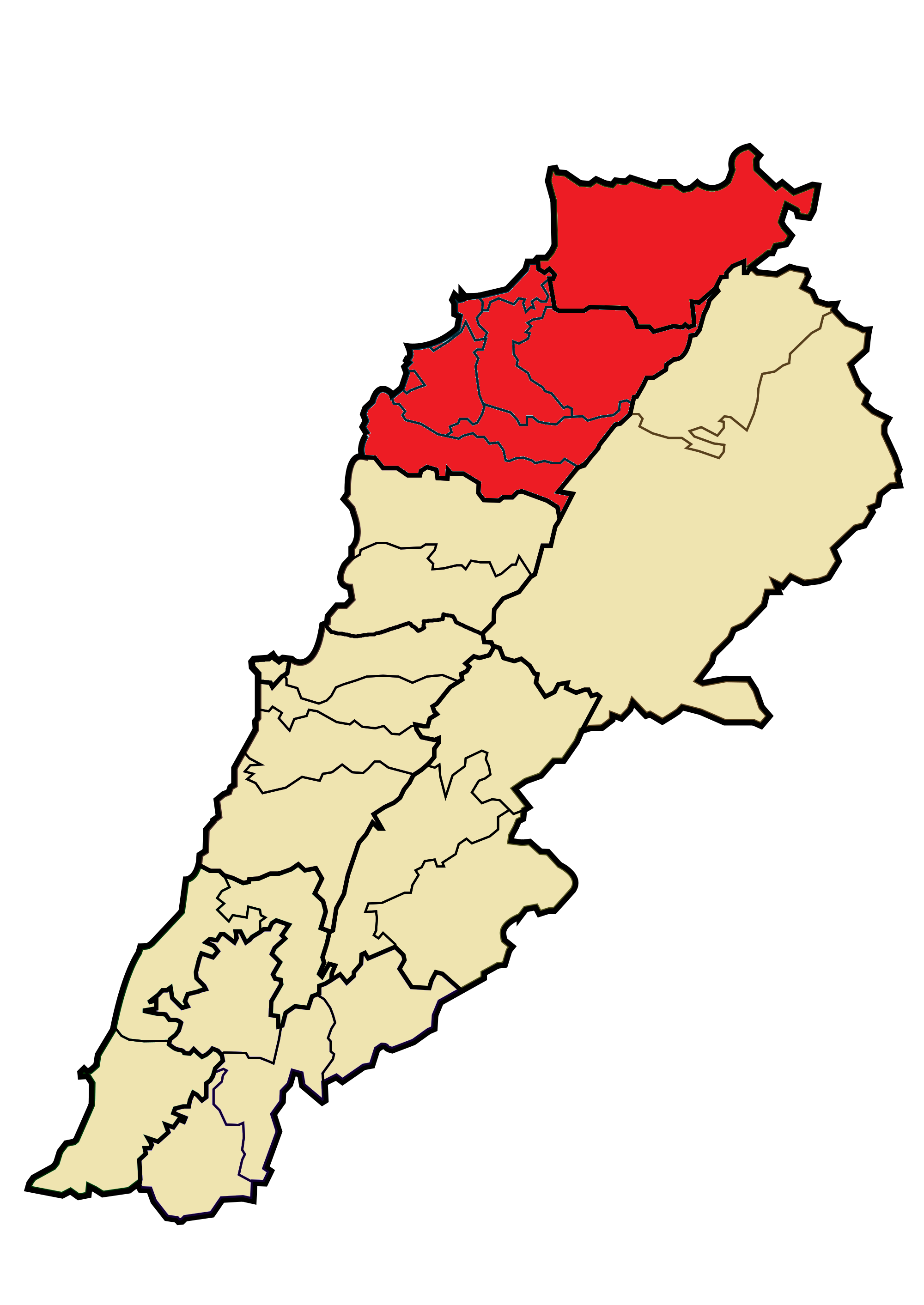
- Map of Lebanon with North Lebanon highlighted
- Country: Lebanon
- Region: North-Akkar
- Incorporated: 1959

Population
  - Total: 1,230,800
- Time zone: UTC+2 (EET)
  - Summer (DST): UTC+3 (EEST)

North Lebanon (Arabic: شمال لبنان, romanized: Šamāl Lubnān) is the northern region of Lebanon comprising the North Governorate and Akkar Governorate. On 16 July 2003, the two entities were divided from the same province by former Prime Minister Rafik Hariri. The division was known as Law 522.

The main cities and towns of the region are Halba, Tripoli, Miniyeh, Zgharta, Bsharri, Amioun and Batroun. The districts of Akkar, Tripoli and Miniyeh-Danniyeh are known for their large Sunni Muslim population while the districts of Zgharta, Bcharreh, Koura and Batroun are known for their large Christian population.

== Education ==
The University of Balamand (UOB) main campus is in North Lebanon.

The most modern public Lebanese University campus is the North Campus.

== History ==
=== French occupation ===
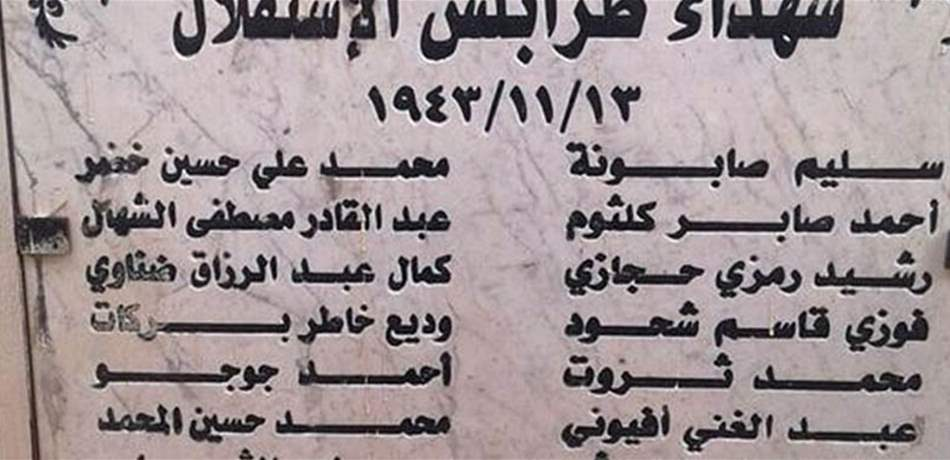
Name of the Martyrs

==== Tripoli Massacre ====
On 13 November 1943, a tragic incident took place in Tripoli, resulting in the loss of lives of 14 students, all under the age of 15. The students were struck by French tanks driven by Senegalese soldiers while participating in a peaceful march through the streets. During the demonstration, the students were fervently advocating for an end to the occupation. The massacre contributed to accelerating the declaration of Lebanon's independence.

==== Background ====
One day before the massacre, the French occupation army arrested Abdul Hamid Karami and imprisoned him in the Rashaya Citadel.

=== Governorate Creation ===
On 12 June 1959, North Lebanon Governorate was created which separated Koura, Zgharta, Bcharreh and Batroun from Mount Lebanon and joining them together with Tripoli and Akkar.

==== New Districts ====
On 23 November 1993, Minyeh and Danniyeh were separated from Tripoli and established their own district in North Lebanon.

==== Akkar Separation ====
On 16 July 2003, Akkar was separated from North Lebanon.

=== 2021 Akkar Explosion ===
On 15 August 2021, 28 people were killed and 79 injured when a fuel tank exploded in Akkar in North Lebanon.

=== 2024 Aitou Airstrike ===
On 15 October 2024, Israel killed at least 21 in strike on Christian town in North Lebanon.

=== 2025 Governor Dismissal ===
On 14 May 2025, during municipal elections the council of ministers dismissed North Lebanon governor Ramzi Nohra from his position.

== Electoral District ==
=== 2000 and 2005 ===
In the 2000 and 2005 Lebanese general election, North Lebanon was divided in two electoral districts: Akkar-Danniyeh-Bcharreh and Tripoli-Miniyeh-Zgharta-Koura-Batroun. Those division were made by Ghazi Kanaan and Rafik Hariri to ensure that the Sunni majority would take away the true Christian opposition representation.

=== 2009 ===
In the 2009 Lebanese general election, North Lebanon was divided into 7 electoral districts: Akkar, Minniyeh-Danniyeh, Tripoli, Zgharta, Bcharreh, Koura and Batroun.

=== 2018 - present ===
Since the 2018 Lebanese general election, North Lebanon is divided into 3 electoral districts: North I, North II and North III.

== Notable events ==
- Battle of Amioun
- Bab al-Tabbaneh–Jabal Mohsen conflict
- Chekka massacre
- Ehden massacre
- Battle of Qnat
- 2007 Lebanon conflict
- August 2013 Tripoli bombing
- North Lebanon clashes (2014)
- 2015 Tripoli, Lebanon bombings
- 2021 Akkar explosion
