= Suleiman Frangieh =

President of Lebanon from 1970 to 1976

His Excellency Suleiman Frangieh OM ONC
- سليمان فرنجية
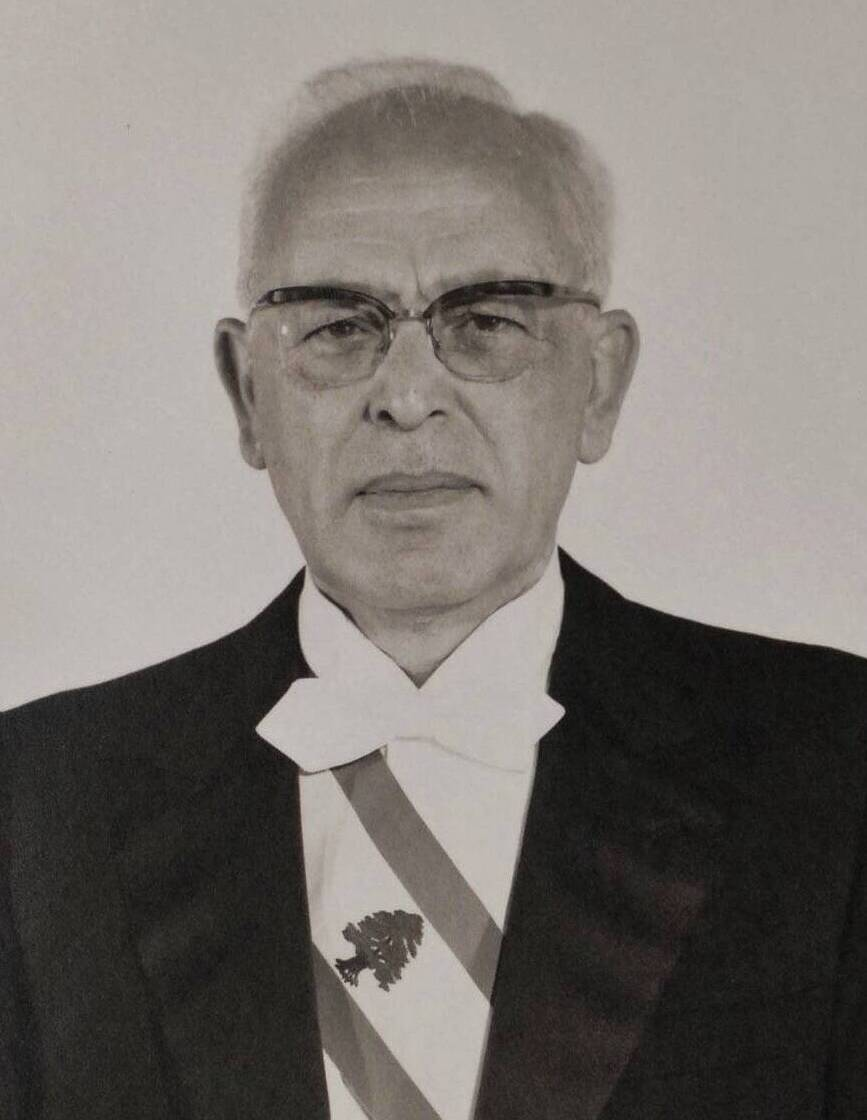
- Official portrait, 1970

5th President of Lebanon
- In office 23 September 1970 – 22 September 1976
- Prime Minister: Saeb Salam; Amin al-Hafez; Takieddin el-Solh; Rachid Solh; Nureddine Rifai; Rashid Karami
- Preceded by: Charles Helou
- Succeeded by: Elias Sarkis

Personal details
- Born: June 15, 1910 Zgharta, Beirut Vilayet, Ottoman Empire
- Died: July 23, 1992 (aged 82) Beirut, Lebanon
- Party: Marada Movement (1978–1992)
- Spouse: Iris Handaly (1913–1995)
- Children: 5, including Tony
- Relatives: Hamid Beik Frangieh (brother)
- Occupation: Politician, entrepreneur
- Religion: Maronite Catholicism

Suleiman Kabalan Frangieh (Note: Arabic: سليمان فرنجية) (Note: last name also spelled Frangié, Franjieh, or Franjiyeh) (15 June 1910 – 23 July 1992) was a Lebanese politician who served as the 5th president of Lebanon from 1970 to 1976.

In 1957, Frangieh was personally implicated in the murder by machine gun of 20 members of the rivaling Douaihy clan. This forced him into exile, but he returned in 1958 due to an amnesty. In 1960, he was first elected to Parliament. During his presidency, he was perceived as a consensus candidate, and he tried to strike a balance between different ethnic and political groups after the outbreak of the Lebanese Civil War in 1975. However, he also founded and led a personal militia, the Marada Movement. The related Marada Brigade was led by his son Tony Frangieh. These militias were right-wing and pro-Syrian, while the Marada Brigade has also been described as a mafia-style organisation.

== Early life and education ==
Suleiman Frangieh was a scion of one of the leading Maronite families of Zgharta, near Tripoli; the family's name comes from the Greek Φρὰγκοι (pron. "Frangi"), after the Franks.

Frangieh was born in Zgharta on 15 June 1910. He was the second son of a politician, Kabalan Suleiman Frangieh. His mother was Lamia Raffoul. Kabalan Frangieh was district governor of Ehden (1908–1913) and a member of the Lebanese Parliament (1929–1932). His grandfather, Suleiman Ghnatios Frangieh, was district governor of Ehden (1904–1908). Suleiman Frangieh's brother Hamid served as foreign minister under the French mandate in 1939. Though the Frangieh family were landowners in Ottoman times, they might have acquired most of their wealth through trade and business activities.

Suleiman Frangieh received education at Antoura, near Beirut. He was also educated in Tripoli and Beirut.

== Career and presidency ==
Suleiman Frangieh dealt with the family's export-import business in Beirut for a time before his political career. In 1957, he was accused in the machine-gun slaying of more than 20 members of a competing clan, the Douaihys, in a church not far from Zgharta. More specifically, he was believed to be responsible for killing around 700 people, 20 of them Christians shot to death during a requiem mass in the north Lebanese town of Miziara. Therefore, he had to take refuge in the Syrian coastal city of Latakia, where he met with two Syrian army officers, Hafez and Rifaat Assad who would be his friends. In 1958, he benefited from the amnesty and returned to Lebanon.

In 1960, Frangieh was elected to his elder brother Hamid's old seat in the Lebanese Parliament. He also became the head of his clan due to Hamid's illness. Frangieh was reelected to the Parliament in 1964 and 1968. Until 1970, he held the following ministerial posts: minister of post, telegraph and telephone (1960–1961), minister of agriculture (1961), minister of interior (1968), minister of justice (1968–1969) and minister of economy (1968–1970).

In the closest and possibly most controversial presidential election in Lebanese history, the National Assembly elected Frangieh to the Presidency of the Republic on 23 September 1970. He owed his upset victory over Elias Sarkis, the official candidate of the Chehabi regime, to a last minute change of mind by Kamal Jumblatt, whose supporters in the Parliament switched their votes to Frangieh.

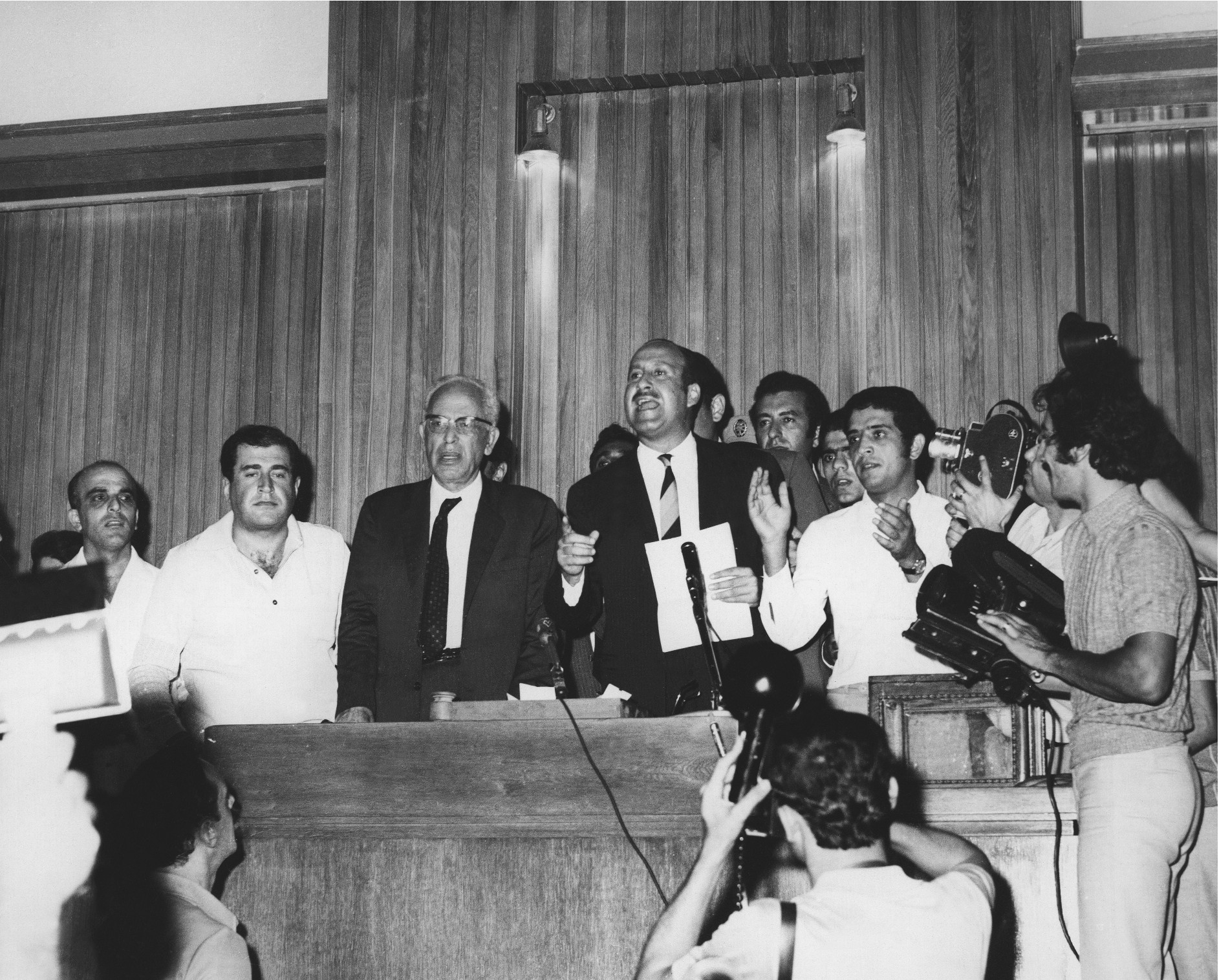
Deputy Speaker Michel Sassine declaring Suleiman Franjieh President of Lebanon in 1970

Posing as a consensus candidate, Frangieh drew support from both the right and the left and from all religious factions; his election was a backlash to the administrations of Presidents of Fuad Chehab (1958–1964) and Charles Helou (1964–1970) and the "Deuxième Bureau" (Arabic: المكتب الثاني) run by the preceding two administrations of Chehab and Helou, as the opposing candidate Elias Sarkis who was head of the Banque du Liban (Central Bank of Lebanon) was widely seen as a continuation of the earlier Chehabi regime.

There were three rounds of elections that year:
Round 1 – 99 Deputies, 5 candidates – no majority
Round 2 – 99 Deputies, 2 candidates – 50 votes each (1 fake vote found), round was negated.
Round 3 – 99 Deputies, 2 candidates, Kamal Jumblatt assigns one of his deputies to vote for Frangieh. Suleiman Frangieh becomes President legally. The events listed above as per the testimony of the late Kamal Joumblatt of his role in the vote.

Sabri Hamadeh, then Speaker of Parliament, had refused to announce the election of a President on a 1-vote difference. As Hamadeh exited parliament Michel Sassine, Deputy Speaker of Parliament, stepped up and exercised his powers of Deputy to announce Frangieh President. Frangieh's term lasted until 22 September 1976.

Frangie's term ended in 1976 when Elias Sarkis was elected as president. However, Sarkis could move to office four months after his election on 23 September 1976, since Frangieh objected at first to leave office.

== Civil War years ==
Civil war in Lebanon began on 13 April 1975. Frangieh as the Lebanese President declared the Constitutional Document on 14 February 1976 that was the first serious initiative to end the conflict and reach a consensus. The document empowered the office of prime minister and suggested a "parity between Christians and Muslims in Parliament", reducing the power of Maronites. Although it was supported by major politicians and religious leaders, it could not achieve its objectives.

In March 1976, a group of soldiers under the command of Brigadier General Aziz Al-Ahdab seized control of a Lebanese TV station, broadcasting a statement demanding President Frangieh's resignation. Frangieh refused to step down, and the Al-Ahdab coup was quickly suppressed due to lack of significant support from the Lebanese military.

Then Frangieh invited Syrian troops into Lebanon in May 1976 in the early stages of the Lebanese Civil War. He had full support of the Lebanese Christians in this regard, since they thought that Syria would be able to force a cease-fire and protect Christians. He is regarded as in large part being responsible for Lebanon's descent into war in the mid-1970s.

When the Lebanese Civil War began, Frangieh maintained a militia, the Marada Brigade, under the command of his son Tony Frangieh. These militias were right-wing and pro-Syrian, while the Marada Brigade has also been described as a mafia-style criminal organisation with little emphasis on ideology. Frangieh initially participated in the Lebanese Front, a right-wing, mainly Christian, coalition of politicians and militia leaders, but in early 1978 he broke with them because of his own pro-Syrian leanings. In June 1978, Tony, together with his wife and infant daughter, was assassinated by militiamen, with Phalangist militia being accused of the plot. After these killings, which became known as the Ehden massacre, the power of the Frangiehs decreased. Ever since then, Suleiman Frangieh was reported to have been depressed. He swore to take revenge, declaring in an interview “the family will exact its retribution.” By some accounts, he went on to engineer the killing of hundreds of Phalange members.

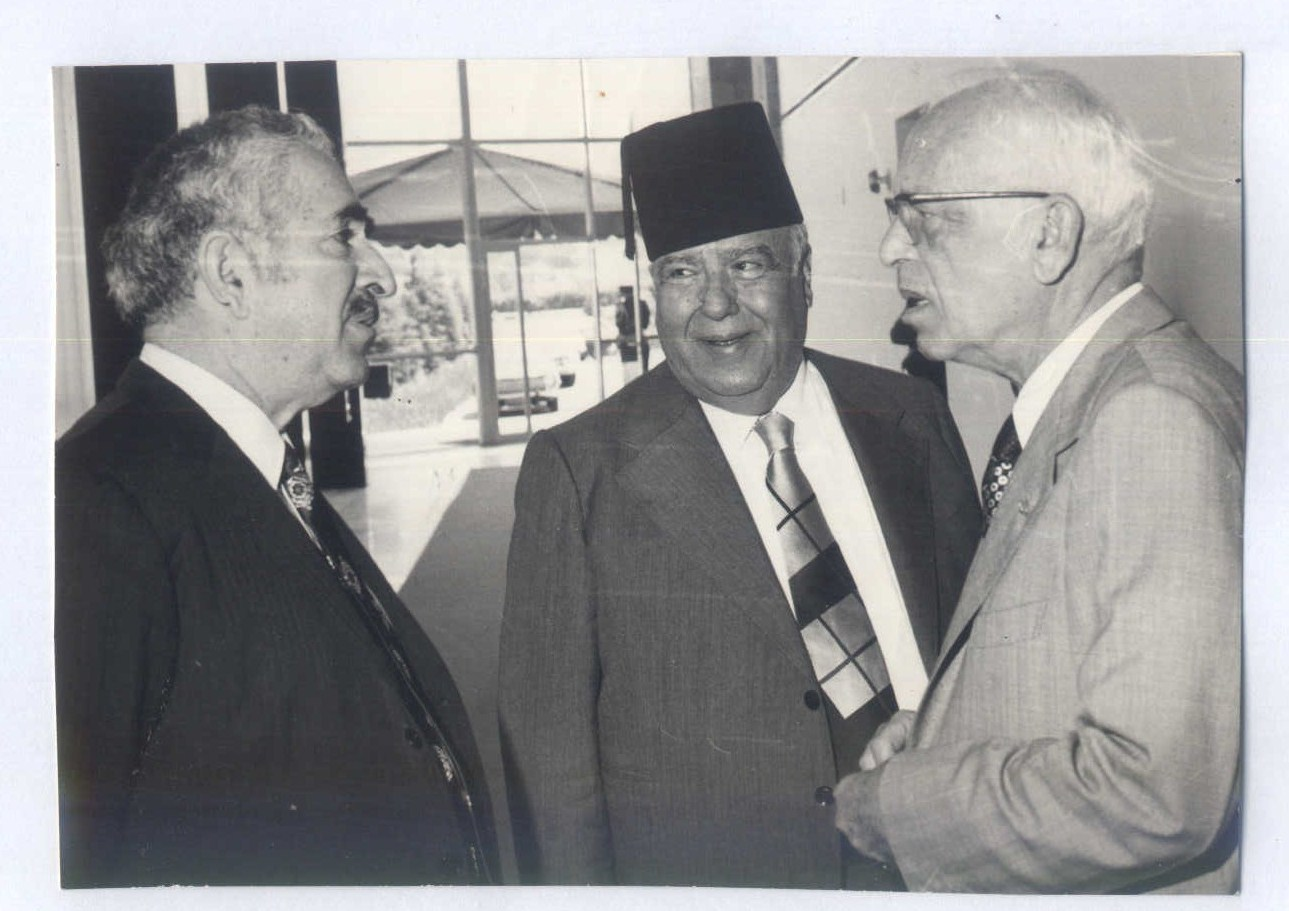
Suleiman Franjieh (right) with Boutros Khoury (middle) and Rachid Karami (left)

== Later years ==
Frangieh remained an ally of Syria. In July 1983, after Amine Gemayel became president, Frangieh along with Rashid Karami and Walid Jumblatt formed a Syrian-backed National Salvation Front to challenge Gemayel's rule and the pact between Lebanon and Israel that was financially supported by the United States. Later Syria tried to make Frangieh president for second term after the end of Amine Gemayel's term in 1988, but the National Assembly failed to achieve a quorum owing to a boycott by some Christian parliamentarians enforced by the Lebanese Forces militia. In fact, Frangieh announced his candidacy on 17 August 1988.

== Personal life ==
Suleiman Frangieh had five children with his Egypt-born wife, Iris Handaly: two sons, Tony and Robert, and three daughters, Lamia, Sonia and Maya. Of his daughters, Sonia, was married to Abdullah Al Rasi who was a physician and politician.

In June 1978, Suleiman Frangieh's son Tony Frangieh, himself then a Member of Parliament, was killed together with his wife, Vera, three-year-old daughter, Jihane, and thirty other Marada partisans in the Ehden massacre. Suleiman Frangieh Jr., the son of the murdered MP, first became the Minister of Public Health at the age of 22, and he served as the Ministry of Interior from 2004 to 2005. He is known to have served with the Marada Brigade in the 1980s.

Frangieh was called in Lebanon as "the tough man" due to his harsh tongue, volatile temper and ruthless approach to some of his opponents. Robert Fisk describes Frangieh as a "Christian warlord, mafioso, militia strongman, grief-stricken father, corrupt president, mountain baron and, eventually, a thoughtful, intelligent, rather frightening old man, living out his last years beside the lions of Ehden."

== Death ==
Suleiman Frangieh died at age 82 in the hospital of the American University in Beirut, after three weeks of hospitalization, on 23 July 1992. He reportedly died of acute pneumonia and had heart and stomach ailments. He was buried in Ehden next to his son Tony.

== Notes ==
Political offices
Preceded by Charles Helou	President of Lebanon; 1970–1976	Succeeded by Elias Sarkis
