= Tony Frangieh =

Lebanese politician (1941–1978)

- طوني فرنجية

Personal details
- Born: 1 September 1941 Zgharta, Greater Lebanon, Mandate for Syria and Lebanon
- Died: 13 June 1978 (aged 36) Ehden, Lebanon
- Cause of death: Assassination
- Party: Marada Brigade
- Spouse: Vera Kordahi
- Children: Suleiman Frangieh; Jihane Frangieh
- Parent: Suleiman Frangieh (father)

Antoine "Tony" Suleiman Frangieh (Arabic: أنطوان "طوني" سليمان فرنجية; 1 September 1941 – 13 June 1978) was a Lebanese politician and militia commander during the early years of the Lebanese Civil War. He was the son of Suleiman Frangieh, a former Lebanese president.

Tony Frangieh was an active participant in Lebanese politics and a member of the Marada Brigade, a Christian militia group that was founded in 1975 by his father.

== Education and early political career ==
Frangieh was educated at the College Des Frères Tripoli, first in Tripoli then in Beirut, at the latter from 1958 to 1960. He was furthering his studies before his death.

Frangieh began his career dealing with his family business. On 25 October 1970, he succeeded his father, Suleiman Frangieh, as a member of the Lebanese Parliament for Zgharta, following his father's election to the Presidency. He was also appointed the minister of posts and telecommunications in his father's government.

== Civil war and death ==
At the end of the 1960s, when factions within Lebanon started to form militias, the Frangieh clan formed the Marada Brigade, also known as the Zgharta Liberation Army (ZLA), under the command of Tony Frangieh. The Marada/ZLA mainly operated out of Tripoli and northern Lebanon, the base of the Frangieh family.

The Lebanese Civil War witnessed many shifting alliance, with former allies turning into foes. One such falling out occurred between two of the leading Maronite clans, the Frangiehs and the Gemayels. The Frangiehs, who were close to Syria, were critical of Phalangist Kataeb Regulatory Forces' militia leader Bachir Gemayel's growing alliance with Israel. Militiamen from the Phalange RF and Marada also clashed over protection rackets.

This conflict led to the murder of Tony Frangieh, his wife, Vera (née el Kordahi), and his three-year-old daughter Jihane by Phalangist militiamen, known as the Ehden massacre. His son, Suleiman, was in Beirut during the massacre.

Under cover of darkness on 13 June 1978, a combined force of 1,200 Phalangists led by Elie Hobeika and Samir Geagea, attacked and killed Tony Frangieh and his immediate family, thereby eliminating one of the protagonists vying for political power in the Christian Lebanese community.

After the massacre, Suleiman Frangieh was reported to have been depressed, swearing to take revenge and declaring in an interview "the family will exact its retribution." However, in a later interview with the Lebanese political channel 'OTV', Suleiman Frangieh stated, "That was the past and it must be forgotten, I do not seek revenge because God is the only judge, thus their conscience will haunt them for the rest of their lives."

Many commentators consider the murder of Tony Frangieh to be one of the factors in the longevity of the Lebanese Civil War and as the starting point of a deep divide between Lebanese Christians. Some 20,000 mourners attended his funeral, including then-Lebanese Prime Minister Salim Hoss on 14 June 1978.

== Personal life ==
Frangieh had two children, Suleiman Frangieh Jr. and Jihane, with Vera Frangieh, whom he married in 1962. His son Suleiman first became the Minister of Public Health at the age of 22, and later served as the Minister of Interior from 2004 to 2005. He is known to have served with the Marada Brigade in the 1980s.

== See also ==
- List of assassinated Lebanese politicians
- List of attacks in Lebanon
