= Ehden =

City in Zgharta District, Lebanon

Ehden إِهْدِن
- City
- Overview of Ehden

- Location within Lebanon
- Coordinates: 34°17′31″N 35°57′16.4″E
- Country: Lebanon
- Governorate: North Governorate
- District: Zgharta District
- Elevation: 1,428 m (4,685 ft)
- Highest elevation: 1,778 m (5,833 ft)

Population
  - Total: ~25,000 (Summer)
- Time zone: UTC+2 (EET)
  - Summer (DST): UTC+3 (EEST)
- Dialing code: +961

Ehden (Arabic: إِهْدِن, Syriac-Aramaic:ܐܗܕ ܢ) is a mountainous city in the heart of the northern mountains of Lebanon and on the southwestern slopes of Mount Makmal in the Mount Lebanon Range. Its residents are the people of Zgharta.

== Geography ==
The mountain town is located 1,500 metres (4,900 ft) above sea level, and is 30.8 kilometres (19.1 mi) from Zgharta, 110 kilometres (68 mi) from Beirut (the country’s capital) and 39 kilometres (24 mi) from Tripoli, Lebanon.

Ehden is a famous summer resort and touristic center, often called "The Bride of Summer Resorts in the North of Lebanon."

Gastronomy is one of the most prominent tourist attractions in Ehden, especially in summer. Kebbeh meshwyeh (krass) and the kebbeh nayyeh, both traditional dishes, and particularly notable in this town.

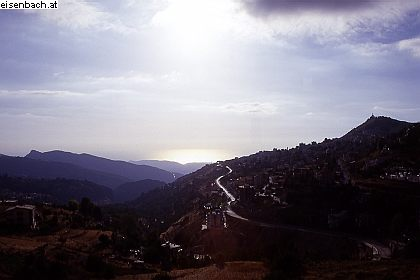
Sunset at Ehden

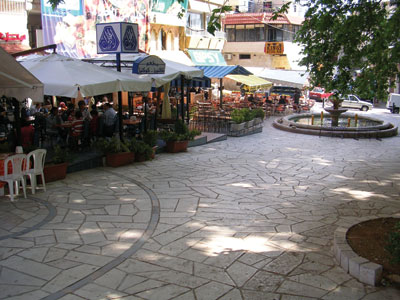
Cafes at Ehden

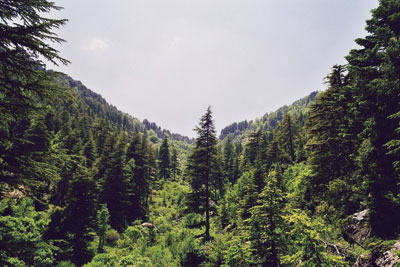
Horsh Ehden

== Etymology ==
Ehden is derived from Aramaic, meaning "the mountain’s base and slope". The location of Ehden at the base of Mar Sarkis Mountain supports this explanation. This view is supported by Anis Freiha who writes:

The name of Ehden comes from Adon, Adonis meaning "power, stability and tranquillity". It is corroborated by the Arabic root Hdn meaning "steadiness, calm and fertility". Adon means also "the base and the mountaintop" translating into "top of the mountain and its base".

Patriarch Estephan El Douaihy, along with Father Martens the Jesuit, lean toward the conclusion that Ehden’s name is derived from Eden where Adam and Eve lived following their exit from paradise. Douaihy left a booklet in Latin regarding his point of view. It is kept in the Vatican Library. Orientalists Hawiet, Rose Goaler and Orkwart supported Douaihy and Martens’ viewpoint. It was contested by Ernest Renan in his book Mission en Phenicie and by Father Henri Lammens.

The Swiss Catholic priest Jacques Mislin stated that some have argued that the Beth Eden mentioned in Amos 1:5 was the Lebanese Ehden, meaning it could have had a prince as early as 773 B.C.

== Location, climate and nature ==
Ehden is located in the central northern side of Mount Lebanon, with a 1500-metre (at Midan square) elevation from sea level. It is 120 kilometres (75 mi) from Beirut, 30 kilometres (19 mi) from Tripoli and 25 kilometres (16 mi) from Zgharta. Ehden used to be the sole residence for Zghartians prior to the establishment of Zgharta. It is known for its dry climate, water and forest. It is a renowned summer location, famous for its setting on the Mar Sarkis (Saint Sarkis) Mountain overlooking coastal towns and villages as far as Akkar to Shikka. A large number of local and overseas tourists visit Ehden annually.

Climate data for Ehden
Month	Jan	Feb	Mar	Apr	May	Jun	Jul	Aug	Sep	Oct	Nov	Dec	Year
Mean daily maximum °C (°F)	8.1 (46.6)	8.5 (47.3)	11.8 (53.2)	16.7 (62.1)	21.5 (70.7)	26.1 (79.0)	28.3 (82.9)	29.2 (84.6)	25.7 (78.3)	21.5 (70.7)	15.6 (60.1)	10.7 (51.3)	18.6 (65.6)
Mean daily minimum °C (°F)	0.5 (32.9)	0.7 (33.3)	2.8 (37.0)	6.5 (43.7)	10.2 (50.4)	14.4 (57.9)	16.0 (60.8)	17.2 (63.0)	13.7 (56.7)	10.7 (51.3)	6.6 (43.9)	2.7 (36.9)	8.5 (47.3)
Average precipitation mm (inches)	243 (9.6)	198 (7.8)	179 (7.0)	81 (3.2)	33 (1.3)	3 (0.1)	1 (0.0)	1 (0.0)	7 (0.3)	38 (1.5)	110 (4.3)	201 (7.9)	1,095 (43)
Source: Climate-Data.org

== History ==
Ehden’s history dates back into the BC period. Its indigenous people transformed rocky hills into land suitable for crops, irrigated by water from mountain streams. The people of Ehden have contributed to the fields of thought, literature, patriotism, and religion in Lebanon.

Ehden was the original homeland for Zghartians who later established Zgharta on the Lebanese coast in the 16th century. It was/is a warmer winter season home below the mountains' snow. Four centuries later it has become primarily a summer resort.

Despite the changes that have taken place over the centuries, Ehden's people have maintained their strong ties to their cultural heritage and history. The town continues to be a vibrant hub of creativity, thought, and spirituality, making it an important destination for anyone interested in Lebanon's rich cultural heritage.

=== BC Ehden ===
Some early texts mention that the people of Ehden are descendants of the tribe of Shem, the son of Noah.

- 850 BC: the Aramean king Hadadezer came to Ehden and rebuilt it, hoisting a statue of its god known then as “Baal Loubnan” or “The god of snow”

- 700 BC: Sennacherib, the Assyrian king through his leading assistant Rabshakeh, occupied Ehden and destroyed it by setting it alight and overturning its statue.

- 300 BC: Seleucus I, leader of an army that was a part of Alexander the Great's Macedonian army, rebuilt Ehden. Seleucus I also built a large pagan temple on the eastern side where he erected a statue of the Sun-god Helios.

- 64 BC: Pompey blockaded Ehden. He conquered and destroyed it.

=== AD Ehden ===
An Ancient Greek inscription was found on the exterior of Mar Mama church with the equivalent date 282 AD and also Greek numerals near the church. Also a Syriac inscription was found which has been translated as saying “In the name of God who is capable of resurrecting the dead. In the year one of Alexander … Marcos had lived and died.”

At the end of the 6th century Ehdenians converted to Christianity. Maronite priests of Saint Maroun and St. Simeon Stylites helped convert them into Maronites. They built five churches all at once on top of the ruined idolatrous temple, using its stones for building Mar Mama, Mar Boutros, Mar Youhana, Mar Ghaleb and Mar Istfan. In addition, they raised huge stone crosses on top of the mountain.

A brief account of Ehden's history has been found written by one of its inhabitants who fled from the Mamluk invasion in 1283, tying the manuscript to his chest for safekeeping.

Manuscript

Father George Yammine found the manuscript, which was written on an old piece of leather, at the start of the 19th century in a priest's home in Bsharri. He copied it and, following his death, his son Sheikh Roumanos Yammine kept it. It was then passed onto Monsignor Hanna Dib Saydet. In 1930, Historian Semaan el Khazan discovered a copy of that document with another historian, Father Youhana Maroun Farah el Seb'ali, who had copied it from Monsignor Saade in 1904. It says:

"Ehden is a very old village located in the north of Mount Lebanon. It used to be known as 'Patchilassar' a Persian pronunciation meaning 'the paradise of the area'. It is enriched with fresh water, trees and a breathtaking water stream called Mar Sarkis bursts off its eastern mountain. A tribe related to Sam, son of Noah settled in Ehden, which later became a famous site."

In 1264 the people of Ehden supported the Crusades in their battle for the town of Tripoli.

In 1283 the army of the Mamluk Sultan Qalawun invaded Mount Lebanon and burnt Ehden.

In 1586, Ehden was burnt again according to a found manuscript but it does not mention by whom, all it says that "Ehden was burnt in the year 1897 of the Greek calendar" which means the year 1586 AD.

In 1610 the first printing press in the Middle East was set up St Anthony of Khozaya Abbey near Ehden. Early publishing was mostly of religious works in Syriac (Karchouni) characters. The printing press is still on display there.

=== Ehden's ancient ruins ===
Ehden used to be a significant site for idolatrous beliefs where numerous temples and enormous statues were located such as “Baal Loubnan”, “god of snow” and “god of the sun”.

Due to major destruction that engulfed Ehden throughout its history, most of those statues and temples were destroyed. Huge rocks that have remained scattered on mountaintops, as well as large stones used in building some of its churches, still leave indication of that era. Father La Monse the Jesuit stated that there are three scriptures in Mar Mama church, two are written in Greek and another in Syriac.

The Greek writing is sited on its exterior garden wall where most of it has been erased through the passing of time. Two lines are still visible in the lower section. A date is also visible of the Alexander year 584, which is equivalent to 282 AD. The second writing is in the shape of Greek numbers written on a gravesite next to the church, but could hardly be recognized. As for the Syriac writing, “Rinan” translated the remainder of its meaning in his book titled “Phoenician Mission” as follows:

“In the name of God who is capable of resurrecting the dead. In the year one of Alexander …. Marcos had lived and died.”

There is also a historical writing, which was transferred to France and is preserved in its Paris museum in the Orient section, numbered 4524 and dated 272 AD. Dr. Philip Hitti in his book Lebanon in History affirms that “Ruins dating back to the era of the Roman Empire are widely spread over the mountains. Statues carved on rocks, in addition to Greek and Roman sculptures, graves, temple ruins and buried columns were found in branched and distant villages like Chouslan, Kartaba, Akoura, Tanourin and Ehden.” Ehden’s most famous Christian site is “Dayr al-Salib” (Convent of the Cross), which is a symbol of an era of transformation for Ehdenians who had turned away from idolatry and converted to Christianity, according to a historical document written by Father Kozma. This convent is situated between Ehden and Bkoufa in the versant of Mar Sarkis’ mountain. It is a large grotto containing an altar and was identified by large stones forming a cross that was placed on top of its entrance, but vanished in 1935. Nevertheless, Al-Semaani wrote in his book The Eastern Library that he witnessed those cross-engraved stones in Hassroun, Bsharri, Ehden and Aytou.

Mar Mama church, which was built in 748, is considered as one of the oldest Maronite churches in Lebanon. Father La Monse described it as “an eighth-century church built over a destroyed Byzantine church (sixth century) which was in turn built over an old Canaanite temple.” Mar Youhana church was built in 779 but was ruined. Some of its huge stones were still around until the start of the 20th century. Two churches belonging to Mar Sarkis convent were built, the first in the 8th century and the other in the 12th.

Names of some areas hold a historical meaning such as “Al-Baoul area” named after (Baal the God), “Bab al-Bowayb” meaning (The Door of Doors) for it leads to the kingdom of “Afka” in Ehden’s forest. Afka is the first holy city in history according to Father Dr. Youssef Yammine al-Ehdeni who is trying to prove this theory by embarking on historical research he has not as yet completed.

=== Present day ===
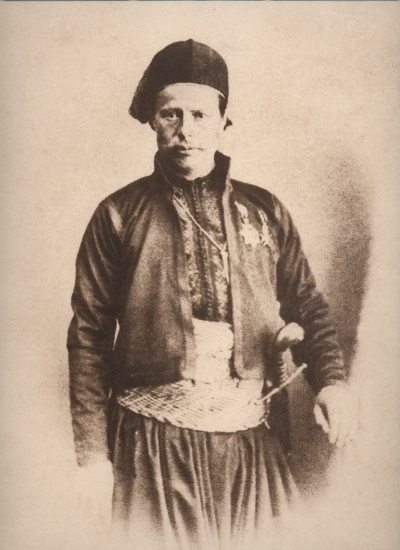
Youssef Bey Karam

Nowadays the people reside in their Ehden homes during the summer months for cooler days and in their Zgharta homes for warmer winters. A popular saying based on this moving between homes is “We cross ourselves and then move down and we celebrate and then move up.” This annual migration coincides with the Raising of the Cross Day, 15 September, and around Easter time.

Ehden is a city known for its moderate dry climate and fresh water.

Visitors reach Ehden travelling from Beirut through Tripoli, Zgharta, Arjes then Ehden, or from Beirut through Seika, Al-Koura, Seraal, then Ehden, or from Beirut through Baalbak, Al-Arz-Becharri, Kfersghab, then Ehden. There are many restaurants in Ehden. Most restaurants are located near Mar Sarkis water stream, Al-Dawalib, Horsh Ehden and Al-Middan. Al-Middan is well known for its cafés, sweet shops and entertainment. Annual folkloric festivals are held on Al-Middan. Many tourists and visitors who attend Al-Middan ultimately visit Mar Gerges Cathedral, the coffin of Youssef Bey Karam and his statue on “Al-Ketla”, and the statue of Al-Sahyouni and Sheikh Asaad Boulos Gravesite. Many cafés can be found in “Al-Moghtaribin” (Emigrants) Street and “Al-Mattal” area, creating an atmosphere of celebration lasting all over Ehden summer attracting tourists and visitors from Lebanon and the world. Concerts featuring stars of Lebanese and Arab singing are held almost nightly. First-class hotels and resorts are available for tourists. In addition to modern motels, bars and clubs.

Ehden has experienced a building boom in recent times extending beyond its traditional precincts where modern villas and apartments were built. New roads have been developed and old ones were widened to cope with increasing traffic. Convenience and tourism services for comfortable living are widely available in Ehden. There are various shopping centres, speciality shops, health services provided in a public hospital operating throughout the year, plus medical surgeries, chemists, official centres, post and phone centre, summer schools. Ehden is a site for art events such as hosting cultural and art galleries, stage theatre, open air plays, lectures and forums held by Zghartawi and Lebanese thinkers and intellectuals.

== Places of worship ==
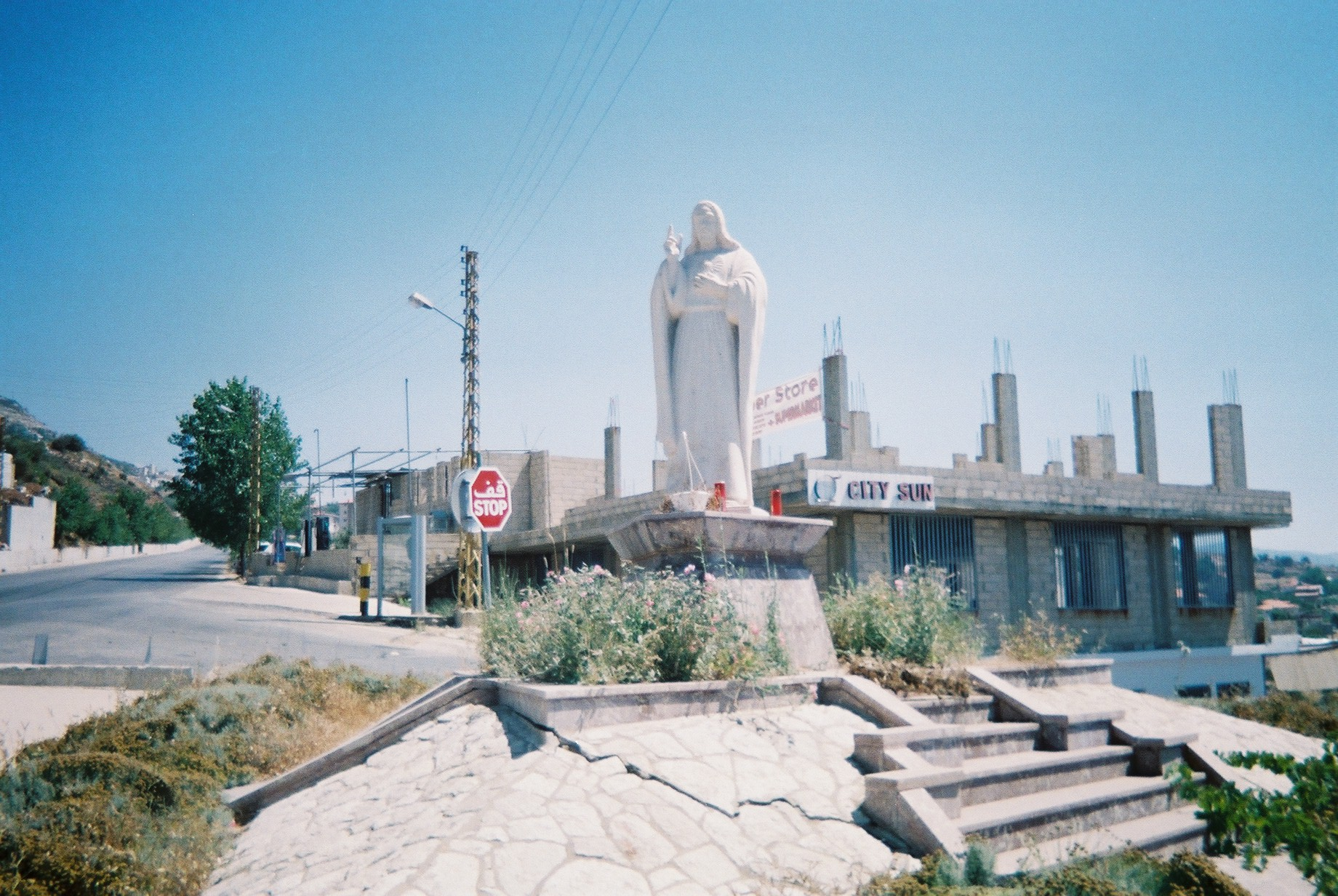
A statue of Jesus Christ near Ehden, Lebanon.

=== The early churches ===
The earliest churches in Ehden are those built over the site of a pagan temple.

A large pagan temple was built by Seleucus a commander in Alexander the Great’s army and raised a statue of "The god of Sun" nearby. The temple and statue were destroyed in 60 BC by the Roman Commander Pompey. Following their conversion to Christianity the people of Ehden built from the stones of the destroyed temple five churches over the temple precincts as a symbol of Christianity’s victory over paganism.

The churches from North to South are:

- St Peter's.
- St John’s. The church no longer exists but was located near the statue of Patriarch Stephane Doueihi.
- St Ghaleb's. Originally called St Zakhia's meaning in Syriac "Victor". This church was near the corner above St Mama's. The building no longer exists.
- Mar Mama church. The oldest Maronite church in Lebanon.
- St Estephan's. Named after the first Christian martyr. This church, which no longer exists, was located a few metres where the present Mar Mama church stands.

The area surrounding St Peter's church was originally the large public square of the pagan temple where the ancient Ehdenians used to meet during feasts and religious ceremonies. They used to sacrifice their eldest sons to their then pagan god for the wellbeing of their families and people. Of course, this was forbidden by God's word: Lev. 18:21 says, "Neither shall you give any of your offspring to offer them to Molech, nor shall you profane the name of your God; I am the Lord." (See also Lev. 18:21; 20:2-5; 2 Kings. 23:10; Jer. 32:35). The blood of those sacrificed used to accumulate in the temple square and then streamed through a stone canal to where the five churches were built. There was a well, which collected the blood near where St Ghaleb’s church stood.

=== Churches today ===
There are 23 places of Christian worship in Ehden, including churches, monasteries, convents and shrines, such as:

Cathedrals

- Cathedral of Saint George

Churches

- Church of Our Lady of Al-Hara
- Church of Our Lady of Jou’it
- Church of Our Lady of the Fort, built over the remains of a Crusader castle at the highest point of Ehden
- Church of Saint Abda
- Church of Saint Anthony
- Church of Saint Stephen
- Church of Saint Ghaleb
- Church of Saint George
- Church of Saint John
- Church of Saint Mary and Saint Ibhay the Syriac
- Church of Saint Mamas Church, which was built in 749 A.D. and is one of the oldest Maronite churches in Lebanon;
- Church of Saint Michael
- Church of Saint Simon
- Church of Saint Charbel inaugurated in 2023, it is the newest and biggest church in Ehden, located at the town's entrance.

Convents

- Convent of Saint Cyprianus
- Convent of Saint Jacob
- Convent of Saint Moura hus
- Convent of Saint Paul
- Monastery of Mar Sarkis, Ras Al Nahr, Ehden
- Convent of the Holy Cross

== Environment ==
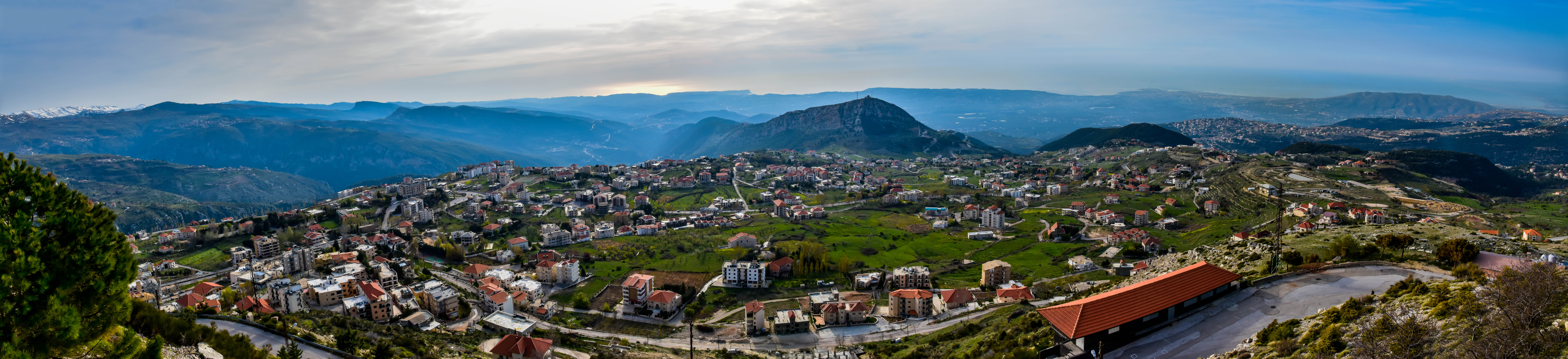
The Village of Ehden

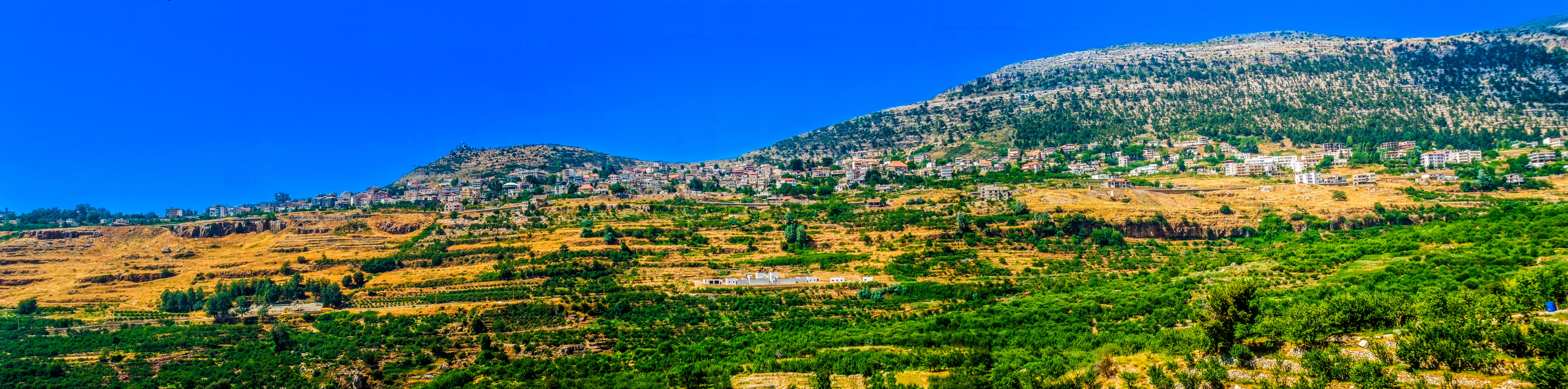
Panoramic photo of Ehden

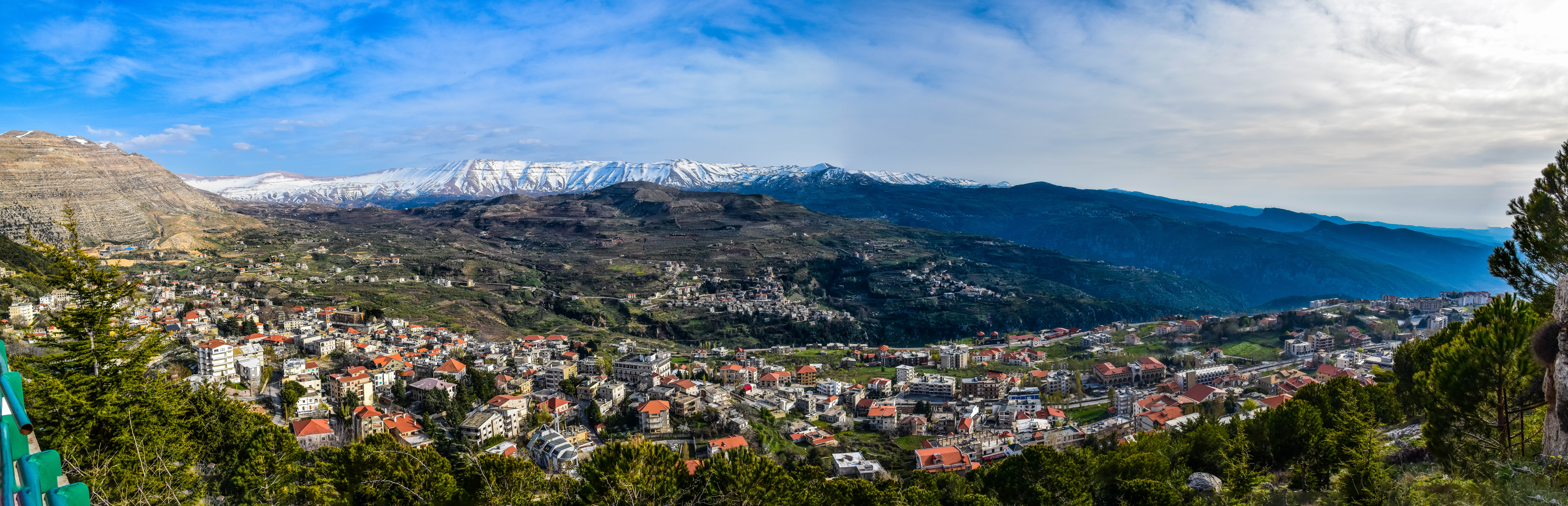
Panoramic photo of Ehden from Saydet El Hosn

The town is also home to the Ehden Forest, with a variety of trees, plants, flowers, and rare animals. The forest was declared a protected nature reserve by the Lebanese government in 1992.

Ehden’s forest is on the northeast side of Ehden and is an area of 3000 hectares, with a 1300- to 2000-metre elevation from sea level. The approximate elevation is 1893 metres at Al-Jafieh, 1550 metres at Ayn Naasah and 1440 metres at Ayn al-Baq valley. The forest embraces a vital natural forestry reserve with a variety of 40 different types of native plants such as cedars, fir, pine, elm and many others. In addition, 400 different distinctive plants have been identified, of which 66 grow only in Lebanon, and 11 are endemic to Ehden.

Some of Ehden’s distinctive plants are:

- Stripirtps libanotica, discovered by botanist and scientist La Plader in 1758
- Dianthus karami, discovered in 1870 by botanist Le Blanche who named it in honour of Youssef Bey Karam.
- “Flower of Ehden’s forest” (Zahret Horsh Ehden)
- Cotsina libanotica, a thorny plant.
- “The tooth of the Lebanese tiger” (Sin al-Asad al-Loubnani)

Distinctive trees include:

- Wild apple trees
- “Al-Derdar”, an elm tree with only four trees of its type left in Lebanon.
- Abies cilicica: Ehden’s forest is the southernmost site for this fir, as noted in the World Natural Plantation demographic maps.

== See also ==
- Zgharta
- Ehden massacre
- Youssef Bey Karam
- Youssef Salim Karam
- Salim Bey Karam
