= 2025 Lebanese municipal elections =

- 4, 11, 18, 24 May 2025
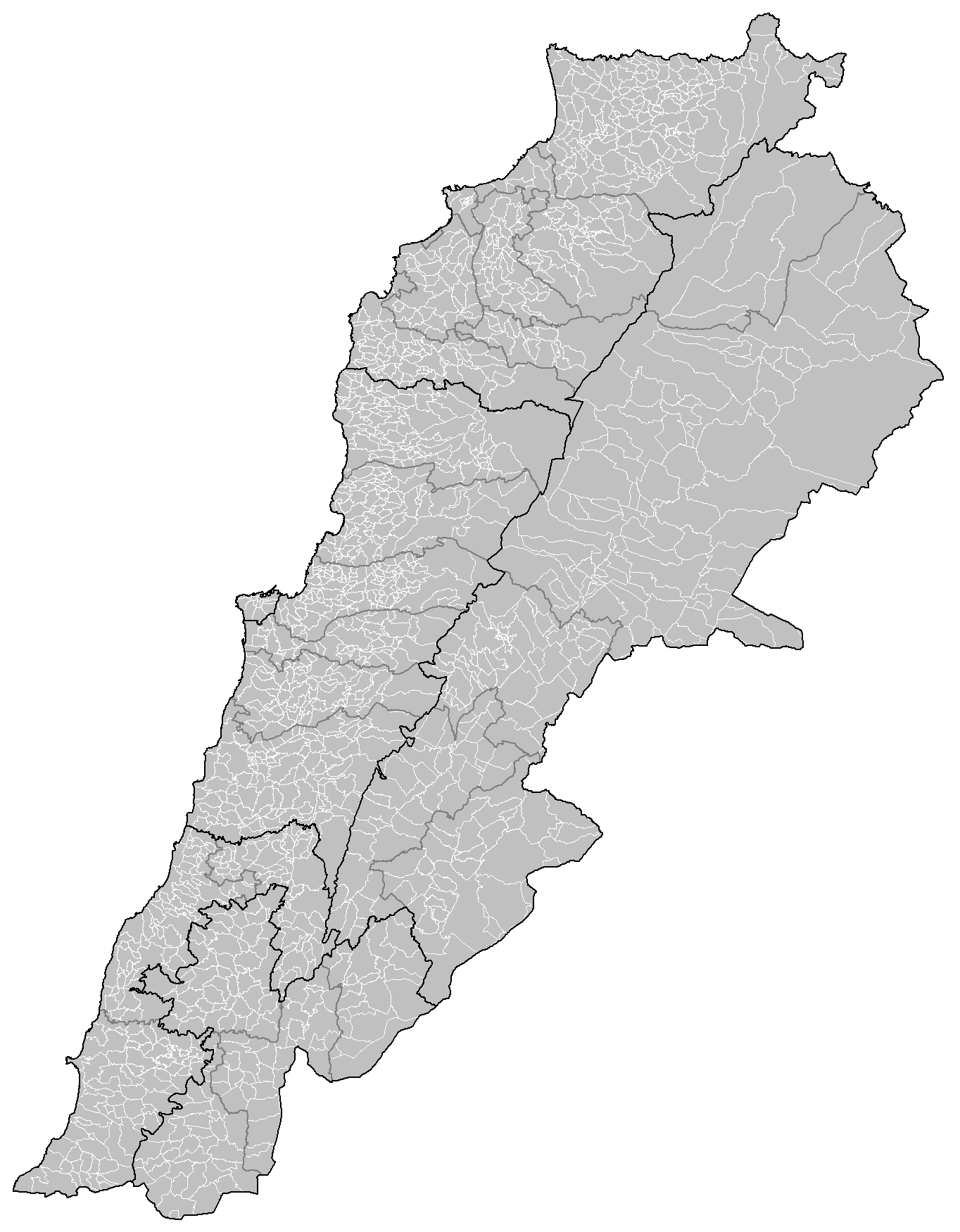

The 2025 Lebanese municipal elections were held in May 2025. They were the first local elections to be held in the country in nearly 10 years.

== Background ==
Municipal elections were originally scheduled for 2022, but were allegedly postponed in order to prioritize the parliamentary elections. In April 2023 Parliament voted once again to postpone the elections, citing a lack of funds. In April 2024, the elections were postponed for a third time due to the ongoing Israel–Hezbollah conflict. In March 2025 the Ministry of Interior and Municipalities confirmed the dates for the elections, which fell on four weekends in May.

According to consultancy firm Information International, more than half of Lebanon's municipal councils are non-functional ahead of the elections. 125 are officially dissolved, 34 were established after the 2016 elections, and eight did not hold election previously for various reasons. These are under the control of governors or sub-governors. There are also hundreds more municipal councils which officially exist, but are de-facto inactive due to reasons including political disputes and a lack of funds.

Elections were held on May 4 in Mount Lebanon and Keserwan-Jbeil, May 11 in North Lebanon and Akkar, May 18 in Beirut, Beqaa, and Baalbek-Hermel, and on May 24 in South Lebanon and Nabatieh. Elections in the South were initially scheduled for May 25, a Sunday like the other election days, but were pushed to that Saturday to make room for the "Resistance and Liberation Day" holiday on Sunday.

== Electoral system ==
Municipalities in Lebanon are governed by a municipal council. The number of seats on each council ranges from nine to 21, depending on the size of the city, while the largest cities, Beirut and Tripoli have 24 members each. Candidates run on lists and are elected according to plurality at-large voting, meaning voters can cast one vote for as many candidates as there are available seats, and the candidates with the most votes are elected. The system incentivizes cross-sectarian cooperation on lists in order to secure as many votes as possible and can often lead to landslide victories with only a plurality of the vote. Voters must cast their ballot in their hometown, rather than in the municipality they currently reside in. This leads to large numbers of people travelling on and around the election days in order to vote, and leaves many Lebanese without political representation in the place that they live.

Members of Parliament Mark Daou and Waddah Sadek proposed a postponement of the elections in order to implement electoral reforms, including the creation of a closed-list electoral system, gender quotas for female candidates, and the creation of large polling stations known as "megacenters" which would allow voters who live away from their hometown to cast their ballots from their residency instead of having to travel to their constituency. Several of the major political parties expressed support for some of the reforms but opposed a postponement.

== Events ==
On April 29, Mount Lebanon governor Mohammad Makkawi announced that 53 of the governorate's 330 municipal councils had been elected by acclamation, including in Bourj el-Barajneh.

Results from the elections in Tripoli were delayed, causing protests, with some candidates expressing concern with the validity of results. While counting was underway, the Lebanese Association for Democratic Elections called for the annulment of the results and a redo of the election. The elections in North Lebanon received a high number of complaints and had over 140 reported violent incidents. On May 14, North Governorate governor Ramzi Nohra was removed from his position by the cabinet.

== Results ==
=== Turnout ===
| District | Turnout (2016) | Turnout (2025) | Change (2016-2025) |
|---|---|---|---|
| Akkar | 61.6% | 48.37% ▼ | -13.23% ▼ |
| Aley | 52% | 42.3% ▼ | -9.7% ▼ |
| Baabda | 50.20% | 39.11% ▼ | -11.09% ▼ |
| Baalbek district | 62% (Hermel incl) | 46.73% ▼ | -15.27% ▼ |
| Hermel District | 62% (Baalbek incl) | 34.56% ▼ | -27.44% ▼ |
| Batroun | 54.4% | 49.84% ▼ | -4.56% ▼ |
| Beirut District | 21% | 20% ▼ | -1% ▼ |
| Bint Jbeil | 42.5% | 26.5% ▼ | -16% ▼ |
| Bsharre | 36.6% | 34.47% ▼ | -2.13% ▼ |
| Chouf | 53.5% | 45.75% ▼ | -7.75% ▼ |
| Jbeil | 65% | 57.46% ▼ | -7.54% ▼ |
| Jezzine | 53% | 41.73% ▼ | -11.27% ▼ |
| Keserwan | 62.80% | 60.94% ▼ | -1.86% ▼ |
| Koura | 43.8% | 39.94% ▼ | -3.86% ▼ |
| Marjaayoun | 43.2% | 30.4% ▼ | -12.8% ▼ |
| Hasbaya | 47% | 35.28% ▼ | -11.72% ▼ |
| Metn | 58.24% | 38.86% ▼ | -19.38% ▼ |
| Minnieh | 57.2% | 52.49% ▼ | -4.71 ▼ |
| Nabatieh | 49% | 41.13% ▼ | -7.87% ▼ |
| Saida-Zahrani | 52.76% | 41.46% ▼ | -11.3% ▼ |
| Tripoli | 26.9% | 27.03% ▲ | +0.13 ▲ |
| Tyre | 47% | 36.51% ▼ | -10.49% ▼ |
| West Bekaa | | 41.41% | |
| Rachaya | | 37.1% | |
| Zahle | | 45.16% | |
| Zgharta | 36.6% | 39.27% ▲ | +2.67% ▲ |
| Total | 48.54% | 39% ▼ | -9.54% ▼ |
Source: https://elections.gov.lb/

== Mount Lebanon and Keserwan-Jbeil ==
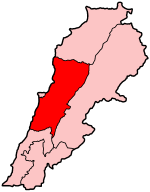
Map of the Mount Lebanon Governorate and Keserwan-Jbeil Governorate

=== Free Patriotic Movement ===
All 18 seats of the Hadath municipality were won by Georges Aoun, supported by the Free Patriotic Movement. Other major municipalities won included, Ras al-Harf, Souk al-Gharb and Mansourieh.

Former Free Patriotic Movement members, Ibrahim Kanaan and Alain Aoun, fielded their own lists and won in their respective towns of Bouchrieh and Haret Hreik against the FPM, albeit the former in a list led by Auguste Bakhos and supported by the LF and Kataeb. Alain Aoun stated that "the president of the Free Patriotic Movement (FPM), Gebran Bassil, launched a war of elimination against me, but did not succeed".

=== Lebanese Forces, Kataeb Party and allies ===
Lists backed by the Lebanese Forces and the Kataeb party scored significant victories, particularly in major towns such as Byblos, Jounieh, and Jdeideh. The "Rechmaya First" list, supported by the LF, won 14 out of 15 seats in Rechmaya. In Jounieh, the "Jounieh Rising" list, supported by LF, Kataeb, and local figures such as Farid Haykal Khazen and Neemat Frem, won all 18 seats. Other notable towns include Dbayeh, Aramoun and Hazmieh with lists supported by both the Kataeb and Lebanese Forces parties won the elections. The Lebanese Forces and Naji Boustani supported the Municipal clerk list in Deir al-Qamar and won while its municipal council was won by a list headed by Naji Germanos and supported by the National Liberal Party and the Free Patriotic Movement.

In Bikfaya, the list supported by the Kataeb Party, headed by Nicole Gemayel, won the elections. The Kataeb party also won all seats in the Beiteddine council in the “Beiteddine We're United” list, led by Abdo Karam. Other Kataeb supported lists won in the towns of Biaqout, Ghabeh, Wadi Shahrour and Chartoun.

=== Hezbollah and Amal Movement ===
In the Chouf region, the list supported by Amal and Hezbollah won in Joun, defeating a coalition of LF, FPM, the Communist Party, and independents. Councils of Jiyeh and Wardaniyeh were also won by Hezbollah backed lists. In the Baabda District Shiite towns like Bourj El Brajneh and Ghobeiry, "Development and Loyalty" lists (backed by Hezbollah and Amal) achieved victories.

== North Governate and Akkar ==
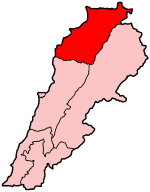
Map of the North Governorate and Akkar Governorate

Final voter turnout was 35.9% in North Lebanon and 47.3% in Akkar.

=== Batroun District ===
Batroun district recorded a voter turnout of 48.26% which saw a contest between the FPM and the LF and allies. The Free Patriotic Movement (FPM), once dominant in Batroun, faced declining popularity and was compelled to form pragmatic partnerships. In Batroun city, the FPM and the Lebanese Forces (LF) ran a joint list, a rare move for these traditional rivals. The Lebanese Forces, the Kataeb Party and Majd Harb, son of former minister Boutros Harb, made major gains against the FPM and their allies in the district. Gebran Bassil accused namely the LF for trying to "encircle, isolate and eliminate" the FPM.

The Kataeb–LF–Harb alliance claimed full victories in Zane (9-0), Kfour el-Arbi (12-0), Hamat (12-0). Lists supported by the alliance of LF, Kataeb and Harb won in Niha (9-0) and Kfar Abida (9-0). In Kfarhelda, the alliance secured 6 seats, while the FPM won 3, and also managed to win 9/12 seats in Aabrine.

In the town of Tannourine, home to the Harb family, the Kataeb–LF–Harb alliance won all 18 seats on the municipal council. In the town of Chekka, the Kataeb–LF alliance won 15-0 by a big margin after a 27-year dominance of the marada movement, in a highly politicize election against the FPM-Marada alliance. Other minor towns fully won by the Kataeb–LF alliance includes Chatine, Boqsmaya, Kour, Chobtine and Kfahay.

Meanwhile, the FPM’s electoral team announced supported lists won in Deir Bella, Eddé (9-0) and Ijdabra (8-1). In Batroun city, the joint FPM–LF list won outright, securing control of the municipal council.

=== Bcharre District ===
Voter turnout in Bcharre reached 32.15%. The Lebanese Forces was able to maintain its dominance in the district by winning in most of the councils it ran in. However, the town of Bcharre was contested by a "change" list supported by MP Melhem Tawk and Riad Tawk who has links to the 17 October Revolution, which secured a significant result against the LF where the list garnered 40.4% of the vote.

=== Tripoli District ===
The 2025 municipal elections in Tripoli were characterized by low turnout, a nearly even split among leading political lists, and significant procedural and security challenges. The results were delayed and counting was slow which resulted in widespread allegations of irregularities and security incidents in Tripoli. These issues led to street protests and calls for the annulment and re-running of the vote by the Lebanese Association for Democratic Elections (LADE). The city recorded a high number of complaints and violent incidents, with security forces intervening in over 140 cases and multiple arrests made during the process.

Among the six lists competing for the city’s 24 municipal council seats, only three had candidates elected. The “Tripoli’s Vision” list backed by MP Ashraf Rifi, and former MPs Faisal Karami and Taha Naji, won 12 seats, compared to 11 for the list supported by MP Ihab Matar and former Prime Minister Najib Mikati. The remaining seat went to Ibrahim Obeid, a civil society candidate from the “Guardians of the City” list.

=== Zgharta District ===
Voter turnout in Zgharta reached 39%. The district saw a contest between the Marada Movement, led by the Frangieh family, and an allies between the Kataeb, LF and Michel Moawad. The Marada Movement won all 21 seats on the municipal council of Zgharta and secured all 11 municipal clerk positions in the city and won in smaller councils such as Kfardlakos. However, the Lebanese Forces–Kataeb–Moawad alliance made significant gains in several towns including Aachach, Ayto, Mazraet et-Teffah, and all but one seat in Sereel. The elections saw dispute between Moawad and Frangieh as they traded corruption allegations with each other. Moawad accused the Frangieh clan of mismanaging and squandering $85 million in municipal funds since 1998, while Frangieh accused Moawad of vote-buying, specifically alleging a $15,000 payment to secure family votes.

== Beirut ==
In the country's capital, most of the establishment political forces joined together in the "Beirut Unites Us" list, as they had previously done in 2016. The big tent alliance between parties with significant animosity, such as the Lebanese Forces and Hezbollah was intended to ensure sectarian parity on the Beirut city council. If Beirut Unites Us was able to achieve a result far enough ahead of its rivals, it could elect all 12 Christian and all 12 Muslim candidates on the list to the city council, preserving a balance between religious groups in Beirut. However, Saad Hariri's Future Movement was absent from the list, due to its continued non-participation in politics, which meant Beirut Unites Us lacked support from the largest Sunni political force. Fouad Makhzoumi and the Ahbash both gave their support to the list, hoping to establish themselves as representatives of the Sunni community, but both lack the popular base of Hariri. Other Sunni political forces moved to fill the vacuum. The Islamic Group and independent MP Nabil Badr gave their backing to the "Beirut Loves You" list, led by retired brigadier general Mahmoud al-Jamal, a former city coordinator for the Future Movement. The Islamic Group was reportedly excluded from Beirut Unites Us at the request of Makhzoumi.

Other lists included Beirut Madinati, running again as a reformist coalition in opposition to the establishment parties. It had the backing of Beirut's Forces of Change MPs. Citizens in a State ran its own list, criticizing Beirut Madinati for creating its list with sectarian quotas in mind and prioritizing slogans over a programmatic agenda.

Beirut Unites Us was victorious, securing roughly half of the votes, but it failed to sweep all seats, winning 23 out of 24. Mahmoud al-Jamal (a Sunni) won 40,251 votes, taking a seat for Beirut Loves You and blocking Elie Andrea, a Greek Orthodox candidate from Beirut Unites Us, who won 37,149 votes. This meant that for the first time in decades, the sectarian parity of the city council was unbalanced. The result prompted expressions of disappointment from several political figures, including Free Patriotic Movement leader Gebran Bassil.

| List | Candidates | Average votes | % | Seats |
|---|---|---|---|---|
| Beirut Unites Us (LF, Hezbollah, FPM, Amal, Kataeb, NDP, AICP, ARF, SDHP) | 24 | 42,054 | 50.9 | 23 |
| Beirut Loves You (Islamic Group) | 23 | 25,650 | 31.1 | 1 |
| Beirut Madinati | 24 | 7,090 | 8.6 | 0 |
| Beirut our Capital | 11 | 3,495 | 4.2 | 0 |
| Sons of the Country | 23 | 2,389 | 2.9 | 0 |
| Citizens in Beirut (MMFD) | 13 | 615 | 0.7 | 0 |
| Independents | 24 | 1,308 | 1.6 | 0 |
| Total | 142 | | 100.0 | 24 |
| Registered voters/turnout | | 514,800 | | |

== Baalbek-Hermel and Beqaa ==
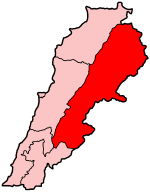
Map of the Baalbek-Hermel Governorate and Beqaa Governorate

=== Baalbek and Hermel Districts ===
The "Development and Loyalty" lists put forward by the Hezbollah and Amal Movement alliance reportedly won all 80 municipalities they contested in Baalbek-Hermel. The large majority of municipalities in the governorate are majority Shiite Muslim. In the city of Baalbek the Shiite duo won every seat, defeating the "Baalbek Madinati" list by over 6,000 votes. Unlike in the 2016 election, the Ahbash did not give its support to the Hezbollah-Amal list in the city, due to a dispute with one of the Amal candidates. The duo likewise won every seat in the city of Hermel. In some Shiite towns, lists competing against the Development and Loyalty alliance attempted to win votes with language evoking Hezbollah's armed struggle. The opposition list in Bednayel was named "Loyalty to the Resistance", which is the name of Hezbollah's parliamentary bloc.

The election in Arsal, a predominately Sunni town on the border with Syria, was driven by family rivalries, and a list supported by two former mayors won 15 seats while a list supported by former Future Movement MP Jamal Jarrah won six seats. Among Christian towns, the Lebanese Forces won in towns including Qaa and Deir Al-Ahmar. The Free Patriotic Movement won alongside Hezbollah in the mixed Christian and Shia town of Duris. In Ras Baalbek a list supported by the FPM, Kataeb, and former MP Albert Mansour defeated a Lebanese Forces-backed list, but ceded several seats to the Lebanese Forces-backed list nevertheless.

=== Beqaa District ===
In Zahle, a list supported by the Lebanese Forces and the USUP defeated a list supported by Michel Daher, Kataeb, and tacitly backed by Hezbollah and the Skaff bloc by several thousand votes. Lebanese Forces leader Geagea hailed the victory, while the regional leader of the Kataeb party was reprimanded after the defeat.
