= Georgy Tarabaih =

Lebanese writer and poet (1946–2020)

- Born: 1946; Tannourine
- Died: 28 January 2020 (aged 74)
- Occupations: Professor, writer, poet
- Awards: Order of Merit (Lebanon)

Georgy Tarabaih (1946 – 28 January 2020, Arabic:جرجي طربيه), also known as Jurji Antuniyus Tarabaih wrote over 40 books and was honoured with the Golden Cedar leaf from the world's Lebanese Cultural Union.

== Early life and education ==
Georgy Tarabaih was born in the Tannourine district of Batroun in 1946. In 1971, he obtained an MA in Arabic Language and Literature from the Lebanese University, and in 1980, he obtained a PhD in Arabic Language and Literature from Saint Joseph University in Beirut. In 1984, he was bestowed with an honorary doctorate in World Literature. From 1980 until his death in 2020, Georgy Tarabaih was a member of the Lebanese University's Doctoral Committee and a Professor of Civilization, Literature, and Criticism. In 1968, he also established the Independent Student Movement. The writer also contributed to the establishment of Tannourine Public High School and served as its director in 1971. He took over as editor-in-chief of the Lebanese educational magazine in 1979. Professor Tarabaih was a founding member of the Association of Retired Professors at the Lebanese University. He was honoured for writing the lyrics to the Lebanese University anthem.

During his lifetime, he received numerous honours and shields for his work, which included more than 40 books and ten poetry collections. In 2007, he was the leader of the delegation to the "Forum for Development, Culture, and Dialogue". After his death on 28 January 2020, an award was established in his honour in Lebanon, which is known as the "Professor Georgy Tarabaih Award for Culture and Creativity".

== Literary output ==
Poetry Collections
Title of the Poetry Collection	Publishing House	Year of Publication	Access Link
Sultan Park (original title: hdyqt alsltan)		1986	
Lovers of the mermaids of the seven seas (original title: ʿashqa ḥwryat albḥwr alsbʿ)		1986	
Captain (original title: alqbtan)		1986	
Testimonies before the Century Court (original title: shhadat amam mhkmt alqrn)	Amchit: Karam Center for Printing	1986	
Night Visitor (original title: zayrt allyl allylky)		1990	
Invocations to the Princess of Villages (original title: iIbtihalat ila amirat al-qura)		2001	
The fortune-teller's revelations (original title: mkashfat al’araf)		2001	
Marble garden (original title: Ḥadiqat al-rukham)		2007	

=== Books ===
Some of Professor Georgy Tarabaih's publications
Title of the Book	Publishing House	Year of Publication	Access Link
Conscience and its effects in Andalusia: a study of Andalusian myths, legends and occultism (original title: al-Wajdiyah wa-atharuha fī al-Andalus: baḥth fī al-asaṭir wa-al-khurafat wa-al-ghaybiyat al-Andalusiyah)	Lebanese Book House: The school library	1983	
Racial and religious intolerance in Andalusia and its reflections on literature and myths (original title: alt’asb ala’nsry wa-aldyny fy Al-Andalus wan ekaasath’ ala al’adb wal ‘asater)	J.A. Tarabaih	1984	
Conscientiousness and its impact on the roots of Arab society: a study of myths, illusions, myths, and the occult (original title: Alwgdya wa’athrha fy gḏwr almgtmaʿ alʿrby: bḥṯ fy al’satyr wal’awham walẖrafat walgybyat)	Al-Matni Press	1986	
Racial and religious intolerance in Andalusia (original title: Taʻassub al-ʻunsuri wa-al-dini fi al-Andalus)	Undefined	1986	
Introduction to the literature of the pre-Islamic era and the Renaissance: Al-Muallaqat, the epic, theatre (original title: mdkhl ela adb algahlya wʿsr alnhda: almʿalqat, almlaḥm, almsrh)	Beirut: Fouad Biban & Co	1987	
The similarities between Lebanon and Andalusia, and the lessons of yesterday to illuminate the Lebanese future (original title: Wujūh al-shabah bayna Lubnan wa-al-Andalus: wa-al-ʻIbar min al-ams li-iḍaʼat al-mustaqbal al-Lubnani)	J.A. Tarabaih	1987	
Nicolas Saadeh: The Comparative Researcher and Advocate of Literary Peace and Andalusian, Life and Literary Influences in the Arabs of the Mashreq (original title: Niqula Saʻadah: al-baḥith al-muqarin wa-daʻiyat al-salam al-adabi; wa-Taʼaththurat Andalusiyah, ḥayatiyah wa-adabiyah bi-ʻArab al-Mashriq)	Undefined	1988	
Creative people from Lebanon and the world: Maroun Abboud, Jorge Amado, Khalil Hawi and old poets of the Apostles Institute on the occasion of his golden jubilee (original title: mbd'ewn mn lbnan walʿalm: marwn 'abwd, gwrgy amadw, khlyl ḥawy wshaʿraʾ mn qdama mʿahd alrsl bmnasbt ywbylh alahby)	Undefined	1992	
Income Taxes in Lebanon: The New System 1997: A Comparative Study (original title: aldrar'eb a'la aldkhl fy lbnan: alnzam algdyd 1997: derasa mqarna)	An-Nahar Publishing House	1997	
Series of the Cultural Forum symposia in Tannourine and Byblos: three comprehensive parts for more than sixty seminars/ (original title: Silsilat nadawat al-Multaqa al-Thaqafi fī Tannurin wa-Jubayl: thalathat ajzaʼ jamiʻah li-akthar min sittin nadwah)	Multaqa	1994-1998	
Georgy Tarabaih: an existential poet with well-known pens (original title: Jurj Ṭarabayh: shaʻiran wujudiyan bi-aqlam ʻarifah)	Undefined	2001	
The Encyclopedic Series of Seminars of the Cultural Forum for the Lebanese International Dialogue: Part Twenty-fifth (original title: Silsilat nadawat al-Multaqa al-Thaqafi lil-Ḥiwar al-Lubnani al-ʻAlami al-Mawsuʻiyah: al-juzʼ al-khamis wa-ʻishrun)	Forum for Development, Culture, and Dialogue	2017	

=== Poems ===
- The Lebanese University anthem (original title: nsyd algama' allbnanya)
- Poems from the visible world (original title: qṣaayd mn alʿalm almar'ey)
- Night Visitor (original title: zayrt allyl allylky)

== Awards ==
During his life, the professor received many honours, including:

- The Lebanese Order of Merit
- The Golden Cedar leaf from the world's Lebanese Cultural Union
- Honoured by the municipality of Tannourine.
- Honoured by the Supreme Council of Culture in Kuwait.
- Golden Star of Great Britain
