= Nimatullah Kassab =

Lebanese monk, priest and scholar (1808–1858)

Saint Nimatullah Kassab OLM
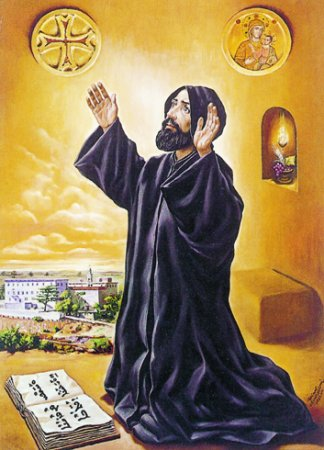
- Portrait of Saint Nimatullah Kassab at prayer.

Religious, Priest and Confessor
- Born: Nimatullah Youssef Kassab Al-Hardini; 1808; Hardine, Mount Lebanon Emirate
- Died: December 14, 1858 (aged 49–50); Monastery of Saints Cyprian and Justina; Kfifan, Double Qaim-Maqamate of Mount Lebanon
- Venerated in: Catholic Church
- Beatified: 10 May 1998, Saint Peter's Basilica, Vatican City by Pope John Paul II
- Canonized: 16 May 2004, Saint Peter's Basilica, Vatican City by Pope John Paul II
- Major shrine: Monastery of Saints Cyprian and Justina; Kfifan, Batroun District, Lebanon
- Feast: 14 December
- Attributes: Religious habit Prayer rope
- Patronage: Beirut, Lebanon

Nimatullah Kassab OLM, also known as "Al-Hardini" in reference to his birth village, (1808 – 14 December 1858) was a Lebanese monk, priest and scholar of the Maronite Church. He has been declared a saint by the Catholic Church.

== Life ==
=== Early life ===
He was born Youssef Kassab, in 1808 in the village of Hardine, in the North Governorate of Lebanon, one of the seven children of George Kassab and Marium Raad, the daughter of a priest of the Maronite Church.

As a boy, Youssef attended the school run by the monks of the Lebanese Maronite Order at the Monastery of St. Anthony in the village of Houb. After he finished his studies there in 1822, he entered the Monastery of St. Anthony in Qozhaya, entering the novitiate of the Order which had taught him in November 1828, at which time he took the monastic name of Nimatullah, which means "the grace of God".

=== Monk ===
As a new monk, Kassab was assigned by the abbot of the monastery to learn how to bind books. He spent the period of his initial formation in the monastic life in frequent prayer, sometimes passing the night in prayer in the monastery church, praying to the Blessed Sacrament. Kassab made his religious profession of vows on 14 November 1830, after which he was sent to the Monastery of Saints Cyprian and Justina in Kfifan, in the Batroun District, to pursue higher studies in preparation for ordination, which took place on Christmas Day 1833. Nimatullah Al-Hardini founded a free school in Kifkan and later in Bhersaf.

After ordination, he was assigned by the abbot to teach at the order's seminary and to be the director of the seminarians. Among his students was a famed member of the order, Charbel Makhlouf, now widely venerated by the entire Catholic Church.

As a monk, Kassab spent his entire life in prayer and the service of his order. He served on its general council for most of the period 1845–1858, also serving as Assistant Abbot General by appointment of the Holy See, in addition to his duties in the seminary. He refused, however, to be named Abbot General.

He was severe on himself but a model of patience and forbearance to his fellow monks, to the point where he was reprimanded for his leniency. He bore all this as part of the challenge of monastic life. One of his brothers, who had also entered the monastery and had become a hermit, advised him to seek a similar solitude. Kassab declined, saying that community life was the true challenge for a monk.

=== Death ===
Kassab fell ill in the winter of 1858, dying after suffering nearly two weeks of high fever on 14 December. In 1864, his tomb was opened for re-burial and, to the surprise of the monks, his body was found to be intact. Such was the reverence with which he was held during his life, that his body was exposed to the veneration of the public until 1927, when a Committee of Inquiry into his possible canonization had completed its work. His body was then buried in a small chapel.

== Miracles ==
Kassab is believed to have performed many miracles during his life due to his deep spirituality and his high virtues. "The Saint of Kfifan" was stated to have the gift of prophesy and hence became known as "a man of vision".

- According to some sources, on one occasion when he was teaching his students and facing a large wall outside the monastery of Kfifan, he had a sense that the wall was suddenly going to fall. Thereupon, he asked his students to move away just before the wall fell down, sparing all present from injury.
- On another occasion, according to Maronite folklore, Kassab was divinely made aware that the barn where the cows of the monastery of Kfifan were kept was going to collapse on them (cows were then considered to be vital assets of the monastery). Kassab asked the monk in charge to change the place of the cows. At first the monk hesitated, but Kassab insisted and urged him to do so. After the cows were removed the roof of the barn collapsed while none of the cows were lost.
- He is also said to have appeared to a blind man who had visited his tomb, and healed his eyes.

=== Healing of the Altar Boy ===
On another occasion, it is believed Kassab wanted to celebrate his daily Mass, but his usual altar boy did not arrive at church on time. Kassab then went to the boy's room and asked him to get up and serve mass. The altar boy was not able to because he had a high fever. Kassab then requested the boy to stand up, whereupon he ordered the malady to "Leave him...". Immediately, the boy was cured and he went and served Kassab's Mass with joy and liveliness.

=== Provisions Box ===
Kassab was thought to have once prayed over and blessed the provisions box (which contained wheat and other foodstuffs) at the monastery of El-Kattara which was almost empty. After a little while, the box was filled and spilled over. Everyone was stunned and praised God at what they saw.

While still alive, people who knew him considered Kassab to be a saint. Often they would come asking him to pray and even bless water to be used on their land and for their livestock. His presence imposed a special respect, reverence, and solemnity.

=== Moussa Saliba ===
According to the Catholic communion, after his death, God granted many healings and miracles through the intercession of the "Saint of Kfifan". One such healing was supposedly granted to an Orthodox blind man, Moussa Saliba, from the town of Bteghrine (El-Maten). Saliba visited Kassab's tomb, praying and asking for his blessing. A deep sleep overcame Saliba and Kassab appeared to him and healed his eyes, enabling him to see clearly.

=== Michael Kfoury ===
Another miracle apparently occurred to a Melkite man, Mickael Kfoury, from the town Watta El-Mrouge. An incurable illness was attacking both of his legs, which rendered them dry, devoid of flesh, and twisted to the point of crippling him. His doctors had abandoned all hope of a cure.

Having heard of the miracles that Kassab was performing this man decided to visit Kassab's tomb in Kfifan and ask for his healing. He slept the night at the monastery and, while he was in deep sleep, an old monk appeared to him saying: "Stand up and go and help the monks carry in the grapes from the vineyard." He immediately replied: "Don't you see me paralysed, how can I walk and carry the grapes?" The monk answered: "Take this pair of shoes; wear them and walk." The sick man then took the shoes and tried to stretch out his right leg, and, to his surprise, he was able to do so. He woke up and started to feel both of his legs which were now full of blood and flesh, and after he stood up he found himself totally healed.

=== Andre Najm ===
According to other sources in the church, on 26 September 1987, Andre Najm accompanied family and friends to the monastery of Kfifane where he prayed fervently at the grave of Kassab. The people around him heard him say: "I beg you, Fr. Al-Hardini, give me a drop of blood for I am so tired to the point where I can't even beg for blood on the street." He then asked to wear the monastic habit, moments later he was cured, and cried out with joy, "I wore the monastic habit, I am cured, I don't need blood anymore!" Najm has not required any blood transfusions since that day, and in 1991 he married Rola Salim Raad. They have three children, a son named Charbel and two daughters named Rafca and Maria. Today, Najm is in excellent health and has become a Maronite priest.

== Veneration ==
The cause for Kassab's canonization began at the local level on 4 April 1929. It was formally accepted by the Holy See on 7 September 1978 and he was declared Venerable. On 2 May 1996, Bishop Khalil Abi-Nader, retired Bishop of the Maronite Diocese of Beirut, obtained the permission of Cardinal Sfeir to start the investigation of the miracle of Andre Najm.

On 26 September 1996, the Congregation for the Causes of Saints in Rome began to study the miracle. On 27 February 1997, the five-member medical team unanimously voted to accept the cure of Andre Najm as a miracle. On 9 May 1997, the seven-member theological team also voted unanimously to accept the miracle. On 1 July 1997, the General Assembly of the Congregation for the Causes of Saints, which includes twenty-four cardinals, accepted the miracle attributed to the intercession of Kassab.

On 7 July 1997, in the presence of Pope John Paul II, the Congregation for the Causes of Saints published the decree accepting the miracle.

Kassab's beatification by Pope John Paul II was held at Saint Peter's Basilica in Rome on Sunday, 10 May 1998. He was later canonized on Sunday, 16 May 2004, by the same pope.

The Maronite Church celebrates his feast day on December 14.
