= Joseph Assaf =

Australian businessman (born 1944)

Joseph Assaf AO
- جوزيف عساف
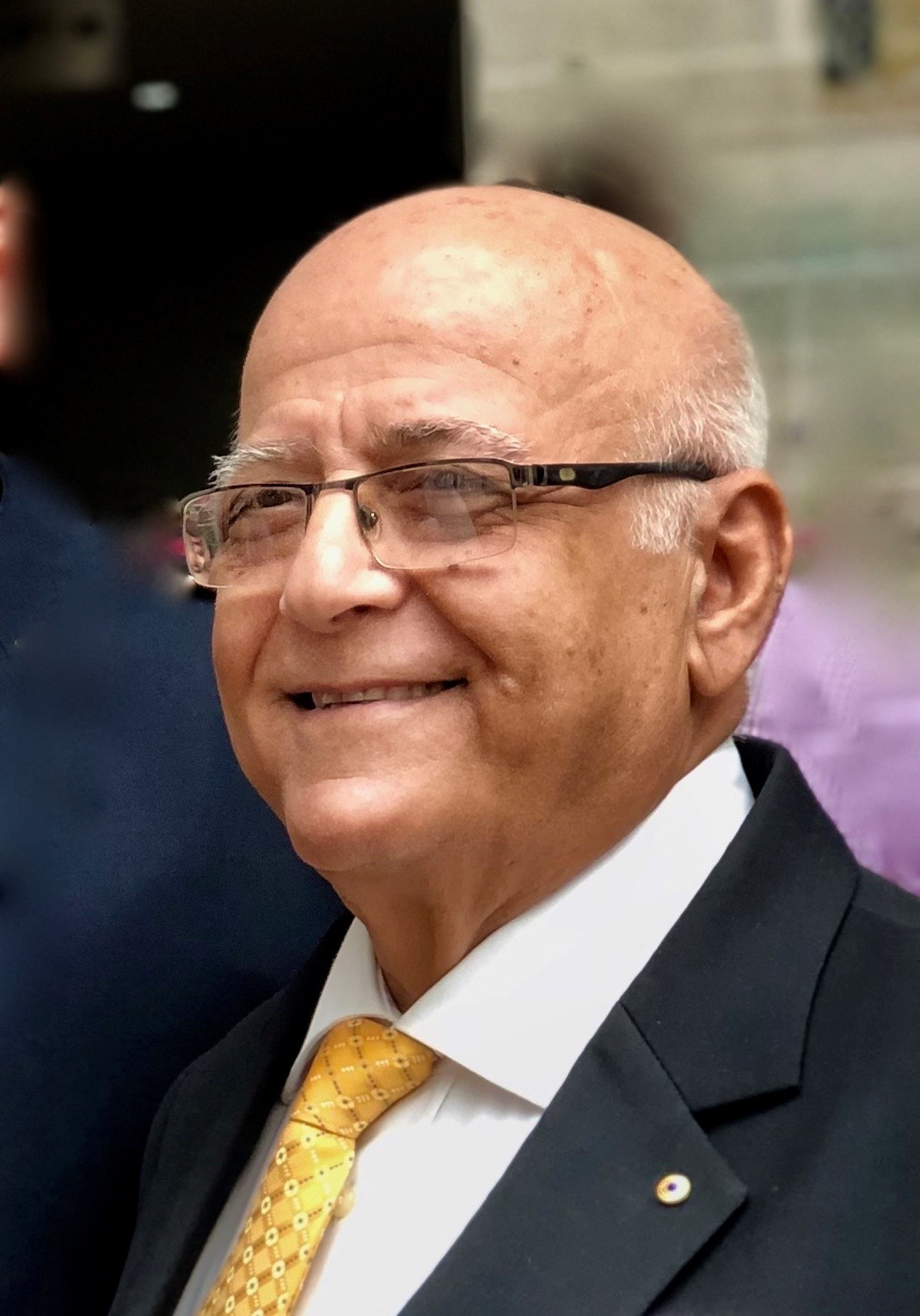
- Born: 20 November 1944 (age 82); Hardine, Lebanon
- Education: University of Sydney (BA); UNSW (Diploma)
- Known for: Multiculturalism; Ethnic Business Awards
- Spouse: Angela Assaf (m. 1978)
- Children: 3
- Awards: Member of the Order of Australia 2010; Officer of the Order of Australia 2018
- Website: josephassaf.com.au

Joseph Assaf AO (Arabic: جوزيف عساف; born 1944) is a Lebanese-born Australian businessman and founder of the Ethnic Business Awards.

== Biography ==
Assaf was born in Hardine, a village in the Batroun District, 80 km from Beirut, Lebanon. His first language was Arabic, and he undertook his schooling in French. In 1967, at the age of 22, he migrated to Australia from Lebanon.

In 1988, Assaf founded the Ethnic Business Awards.

In 2008, Jascom International Pty Ltd published Assaf's book In Someone Else's Shoes, a memoir detailing his experiences as a migrant in Australia. It also explores his understanding of Australian society in the context of multiculturalism.

In June 2013, Australian Prime Minister Julia Gillard announced the appointment of Assaf to the Civil Society 20 group – the C20 – as part of the wider engagement process for the G20 meeting in Australia in 2014.

In 2014, Assaf was interviewed for the National Archives of Australia's touring exhibition A Ticket to Paradise? for the National Collecting Institution's Touring and Outreach Program.

== Honours and awards ==
On 14 June 2010, Assaf was named a Member of the Order of Australia "for service to multiculturalism, to business in the fields of marketing and communications, and to the community as a supporter of a range of charitable organisations."

On 11 June 2018, Assaf was named an Officer of the Order of Australia "for distinguished service to multiculturalism, and to business, as a supporter of community education projects for people from linguistically diverse backgrounds, and to cultural harmony and inclusion."

In 2019 the City of Canada Bay in New South Wales named Assaf citizen of the year."City of Canada Bay citizen of the year Joseph Assaf". Daily Telegraph. 26 January 2019. Archived from the original on 21 October 2021. "Joseph Assaf a pioneer of communicating with diversity"
