= Baatara gorge waterfall =

Waterfall in northern Lebanon

Baatara gorge sinkhole
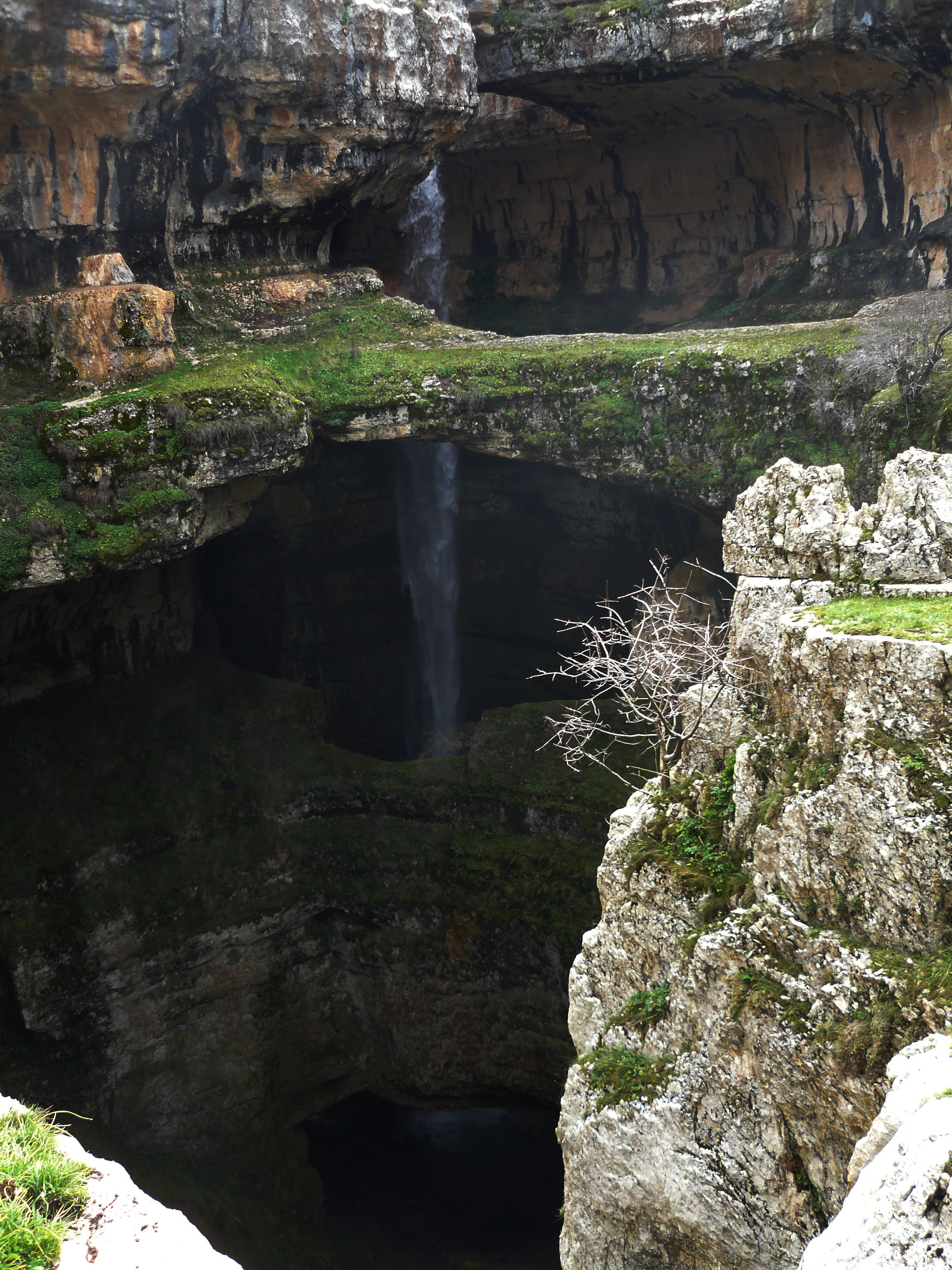
- Interactive map of Baatara gorge sinkhole
- Location: Chatine, Lebanon
- Coordinates: 34°10.406′N 35°52.222′E
- Type: Plunge
- Number of drops: 1
- Longest drop: 90–100 m (300–330 ft)

The Baatara gorge sinkhole (Baatara gorge waterfall) is a waterfall in the Batroun district of Lebanon near the village of Chatine in the town of Tannourine.

The waterfall drops 255 metres (837 ft) into the Balaa Pothole, a cave of Jurassic limestone located on the Lebanon Mountain Trail. The cave is also known as the Cave of the Three Bridges. Traveling from Laklouk to Tannourine one passes the village of Balaa, and the Three Bridges Chasm (in French Gouffre des Trois Ponts) is a five-minute journey into the valley below where one sees three natural bridges, rising one above the other and overhanging a chasm descending into Mount Lebanon. During the spring melt, a 90–100-metre (300–330 ft) cascade falls behind the three bridges and then down into the 240-metre (790 ft) chasm.

Discovered to the western world in 1952 by French bio-speleologist Henri Coiffait, the waterfall and accompanying sinkhole were fully mapped in the 1980s by the Spéléo club du Liban. A 1988 fluorescent dye test demonstrated that the water emerged at the spring of Dalleh in Mgharet al-Ghaouaghir (located near Balaa).
