= Selaata =

Selaata سلعاتا
- Village
- Location of Selaata within Lebanon
- Coordinates: 34°16′46″N 35°39′49″E
- Country: Lebanon
- Governorate: North Governorate
- District: Batroun District

Population
  - Total: 429
- Time zone: UTC+2 (EET)
  - Summer (DST): UTC+3 (EEST)

Selaata (Arabic: سلعاتا, romanized: Selʿātā) is a village in the Batroun district of the North Lebanon governorate in Lebanon. The town is approximately 45 km north of Beirut and approximately 3 km north of Batroun. The population is almost exclusively Maronite Christian. The town overlooks the Lebanon Chemicals plant.
