= Ethnic Business Awards =

Honorary event

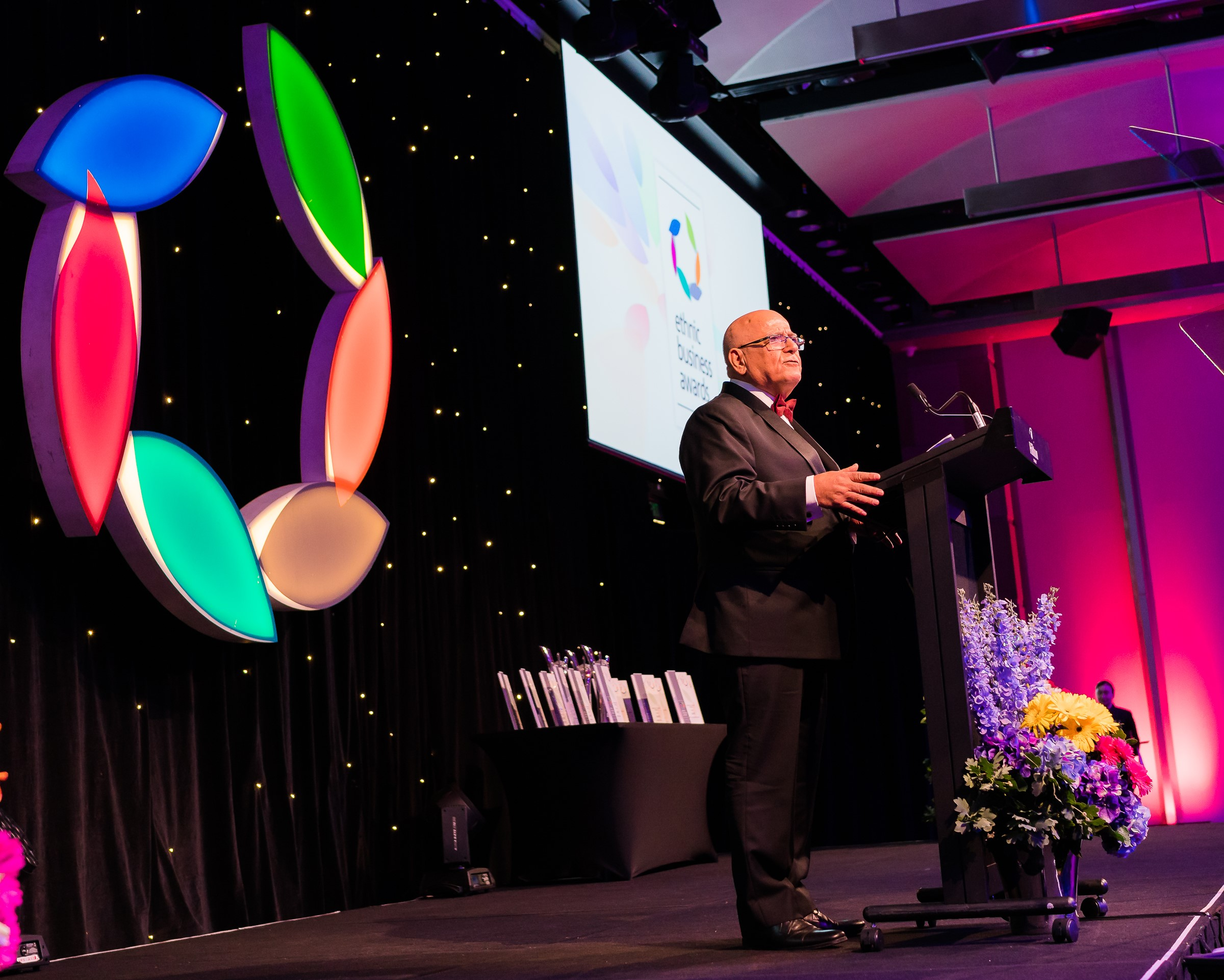
- Joseph Assaf AO at the 30th Annual Ethnic Business Awards
- Awarded for: Excellence of Migrants and Indigenous people in Australian business
- Country: Australia
- Presented by: The EBA Foundation
- First award: 1988; 38 years ago
- Website: www.ethnicbusinessawards.com

Television/radio coverage
- Network: Aurora Community Channel, SBS (Australian TV channel), NITV
- Runtime: Approx. 60–120 min.

Ethnic Business Awards (EBA) are Australian business awards that recognise achievements of migrant and Indigenous business owners, focusing on contributions made by migrants and the First Australians to business, economy and multiculturalism.

They were founded in 1988 by Joseph Assaf AO, a Lebanese born Australian who specializes in multicultural marketing and businesses.

== Categories ==
The Ethnic Business Awards consist of the following three categories:

- Small Business (with turnover of less than or equal to $10 million per annum)
- Medium to Large Business (with turnover of greater than $10 million per annum)
- Indigenous in Business
