= Charbel Dagher =

Lebanese professor

- شربل داغر
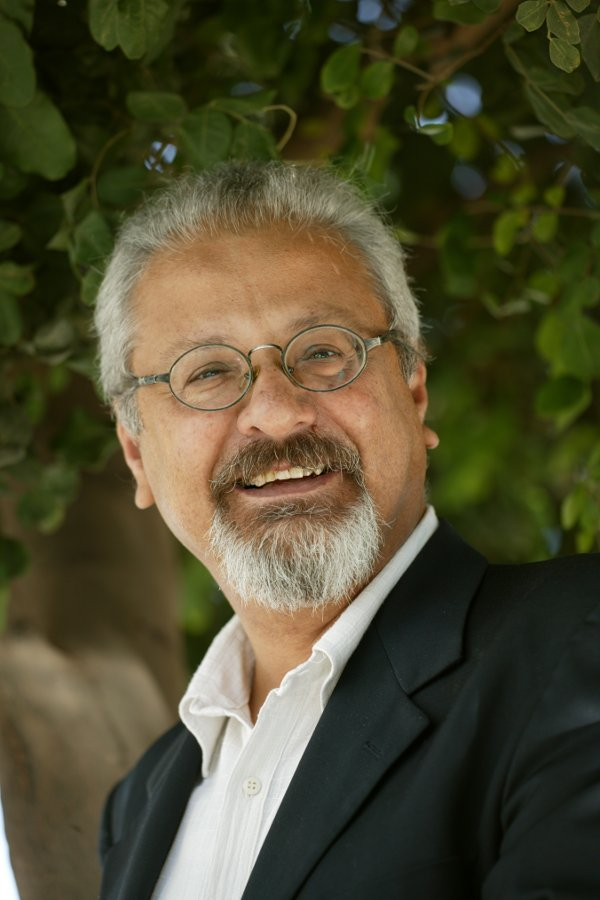
- Born: 5 March 1950 (age 76); Wata Houb, Tannourine, Batroun, Lebanon
- Occupations: Poet, writer, story-writer
- Website: charbeldagher.com

Charbel Dagher (Arabic: شربل داغر) is a Lebanese professor at the University of Balamand, Koura, Lebanon. He has been an active and prominent voice on the Arab cultural scene, mainly in the fields of poetry, Arabic language, and Arab and Islamic arts. He is a Poet, writer and story-writer in both Arabic and French.

== Career ==
Charbel Dagher was born in Wata Hub, Tannourine, Lebanon on 5 March 1950. He graduated from the New Sorbonne University – Paris III, and is a holder of two PhD's in Modern Arabic Letters (1982) and Aesthetics of Arts (1996). He is a professor at the University of Balamand, Lebanon.
As a professor, he cooperated with the University of Toulouse Le Mirail, the University of Metz and the University of Paris V – New Sorbonne in France, the University of Malta in Malta and the University of Bologna in Italy. He also worked as a visiting professor at Higher Institutes for Fine Arts in several Tunisian cities, including Tunis, Sfax and Gabes...
Dagher is a consultant in Islamic art and modern fine arts. As a journalist, he wrote in Arabic and French in Beirut, Paris and London. His works were published in several international periodicals such as the UNESCO Courier (Paris) and 'Fikrr wa Fan' (Munich).
He has overseen several scientific conferences including "Young Poets: Questions and Challenges" (Al-Mu'tamid ibn Abbad University, Morocco, 1987), "Art and Market" (Arab European University and University of Malta, Malta, 1987), "Art and the City" (Arab European University and Bologna University, Italy, 1988), "Arabic Poetry: Modernity Now" (Al-Mu'tamid ibn Abbad University, Morocco, 1990), "Arabic in Lebanon" (University of Balamand, Lebanon, 1997) and "Renaissance: Liberal Introductions to Modernity" (American University in Beirut, Beirut, 1998).
He was selected as the general coordinator of the international acknowledgement of the president-poet Léopold Sédar Senghor in 1990.
He held the position of the Secretary General of the Executive Council of the "Arab-African Cultural Forum" (Rabat) between 1986 and 1988 and the Secretary General of the "African Poetry Award" (Asilah, Morocco) since it was first established in 1989 to 1993. He chaired art juries in various events including the "Fine Arts Festival" in Bahrain (1997, 2000), the 6th Sharjah International Biennial (2003), Oman Fine Arts Festival (2006). He also participated in Liège Biennal (Belgium), Cairo Biennal, Dakar Biennal, and in other cities.

== Poetry ==
- "Futat al-Bayadh", Arab Institute for Research and Publishing, Beirut, 1981.
- "Rashm", al-Ward Publishing House, Beirut, 2000.
- "Takht Sharqi", Arab Institute for Research and Publishing, Beirut-Amman, 2000.
- "Hateb Lail", al-Nahar Publishing House, Beirut, 2001.
- "Ghairi Bisifat Koni", Sharqiyat Publishing and Distribution House, Cairo, 2003.
- "Eraban Lishakl", Arab Institute for Research and Publishing, Beirut-Amman, 2004.
- "La Tabhath An Mana La'alaho Yalqak", Sharqiyat Publishing and Distribution House, Cairo, 2006.
- "Taledoni Kalemati", Mohammed Ali al-Hami House, Sfax, 2007.
- "Transit", Dar al-Nahda al-Arabiya, Beirut, 2009.
- "Walimat Qamar", Authority of Culture Palaces, Cairo, 2009
- "al-Qasida Leman Yashtahiha", Dar al-Nahda al-Arabiya, Beirut, 2010.
- Part of his poetry has been translated into several languages, including French, English, German and Italian. Dr. Naoum Abi Rashid published selections of his poetry in French, entitled "Obscurités aux aguets" (2005).
- Dr. Mostafa el-Kelany wrote an essay about his work entitled "Charbel Dagher: To Desire The Poem", Sharqiyat Publishing and Distribution House, Cairo, 2007.

== Artworks inspired by his poetry ==
A number of artists and theater directors have chosen Dagher's poems as subjects for their exhibitions or drama performances:

- Jamal Abdulrahim: "Rashm" (An illustrated series of poems in Arabic, French and English), Bahrain, 2000.
- Mohamed Abu el-Naga: "Shaghaf" (a selection of poems featuring several art works), Alexandria, 2001.
- Wejdan (Jordan), Etel Adnan and Ghada Jamal (Lebanon), Jamal Abdulrahim (Bahrain), Hanaa Mal-Allah (Iraq), Mohamed Abu el-Naga (Egypt) and Faisal al-Samra (Saudi Arabia): "Tawashojat", Jordan National Museum for Fine Arts, Amman, 2003.
- Salem al-Labban: "Atabat Lelraheel... Wa Lelwosool Aydan" (poetic drama), Monastir (Tunisia), 2006.
- Ahmed Jared: "Ma Yajma'oni Benajmi al-Ba'eed" (art book in French and Arabic) Casablanca, 2007.

== Translation of poetry ==
- "AI-Aaber al-Haa'il Bna'al Min rih" (translation of Rimbaud's letters into Arabic), al-Mu'assasah al-HimirnTyah lilDirasat wa-al-Nashr, Beirut, 1985. 2nd Edition, 2005, Dar Al Maareff Printing and Publishing, Tunisia, 1989.
- "Dam Aswad" (African poetical selections), al-Moheet House, Asilah, Morocco, 1989.
- "Negro-African Poetry Anthology", Arab Institute for Research and Publishing, Beirut-Amman, 1998.
- "Al-Wasiya", by Rilke along with his correspondence with the Russian poet, Marina Tsvetayeva, al-Jamal Publications, Cologne (Germany), 2001.
- "Shamlo Tashabohen Dhaea" (selections from Andree Chedid's poems), National Council for Culture, Arts and Letters, Kuwait, 2001.
- "Léopold Sédar Senghor: Tam Tam Nigre", National Council for Culture, Arts and Letters, Kuwait, 2002.

== Novels ==
- "Wasiyat Habeel", Riyadh Najeeb al-Rayes Publishing Co., Beirut, 2008.
- (Revision and Introduction) "Wa'i. Ethan Lasto Befrenji" by Khalil al-Khuri (1859), al-Farabi House, Beirut, 2009.

== Literature ==
- "Arab Oral Traditions" (in French), UNESCO, Paris, 1985.
- "Al-Sheriya al-Arabiya al-Haditha", Tobqal Publishing House, Casablanca, 1988, 2nd Edition, Mukhtarat Publishing House, Amman, 2006.
- (Overseeing) "Senghor: An African Humanist" (in French), Edifra House, Paris, 1991.
- (Overseeing) "Arabic in Lebanon", University of Balamand Publications, 1999.
- (Overseeing) "Renaissance: Liberal Introductions for Modernity", Arab Cultural Center, Beirut-Casablanca, 2000.
- "Tannourine during the Ottoman Era", Al-Furat Publishing and Distribution House, Beirut, 2006.
- "Arabic and Modernity", Al-Nahar Publishing House, with the University of Balamand Publications, Beirut, 2009.
- "Contemporary Arabic Poetry - the prose", Al Maaref Forum, 2018.

== Aesthetics ==
Dagher published several major works which have received high praise from diverse groups of critics in the Arab World. His long list of publications on modern Arabic art and Islamic art includes:

- "Al-Hroofiya al-Arabiya: Fan Wa Hawiya" (“Art and identity”), al-Matboat al-Sharqiay Co., Beirut, 1991.
- "Mathaheb al-Hosn: Qeraa Mojamiya-Tarikhiya Lelfnoon Fi al-Arabiya" (“Mazahib al-Husn: a Lexicographical-Historical Reading of Arab Arts”), Arab Cultural Center, Beirut-Casablanca, in collaboration with the "Royal Society for Fine Arts" in Jordan, 1998.
- "Al-Fan al-Islami Fi al-Masader al-Arabiya: Sina'at al-Zena Wa aI-Jamal" (“Islamic Art in Arabic Sources”), Arab Cultural Center, Beirut-Casablanca, in collaboration with the "Dar al-Athar al-Islamiyyah" in Kuwait, 1999.
- "Al-Loha al-Arabiya Bayna Siyaq Wa Ofoq" (“The Arab Painting: Between Context and Horizon”), Arab Center for Arts, Sharjah, 2003.
- "Al-Fan Wa al-Sharq: al-Melkiya Wa al-Ma'ana Fi al-Tadawol" (“Art and the East”) – two volumes- Arab Cultural Center, Beirut-Casablanca, 2004.
- "Al-Ayn Wa al-Loha: al-Mohtarefat al-Arabiya" (“Eye and Canvas”), Arab Cultural Center, Beirut-Casablanca, 2006"
- “Ma al-Jamaliya"(Translation) by Marc Jimenez, Arab Organization for Translation, Beirut, 2009.
- Author (along with four non-Arab authors) : "Art in the Islamic World" by the Oryx Production Co. (France), a film featuring the most beautiful selected collection of Islamic art, 2001.
- Some of his studies on ancient (oriental and Islamic) and modern (western and Arabic) arts have been translated into other languages, including English (USA), German and French.
- In an interview about his books, Dagher said: "I cannot establish a general description of my poetry. Many voices pillage my poetry, or rather scuffle over it, a thing I cannot control or adopt, especially when its essence does not emanate from an articulating self, but is defined by a structure that is linked to the out-side, with others and with the world itself. It is also difficult for me to delineate a goal for my journey in writing, for I have not hesitated to submerge myself, as if in a sea, surrounded so completely by water, that I do not see an outlet or an exit except to strive and work and paddle continuously so that finding the way, eventually, is nothing but the end of the struggle and the comfort of arrival (...). Nevertheless, I can say that in writing there is the promise that the act of writing gives itself through the writer and the promise to the reader that is often indirect, postponed, and at times unfulfilled like a letter in a bottle thrown in the sea. This promise is part of our aspired humanity which is heightened, driven and amplified through the multiplicity of meaning".
- In "My Computer, My Portable Metaphor", Dagher adds: "For in writing, in focusing on it, in the fact that it demands more energy of me than all my other activities, is what attracts me to it and what makes it my recreation, for its value is inherent within it; in performing it; in the fact that it spontaneously justifies itself; in that, although seemingly repetitive, it is a transformational activity for things that appear to be hidden from me but are in fact parts of me, closer to me than myself. If writing finds something outside itself that would justify that self to the reader, then this indicates to me again that our abilities transcend us with their flying arrows".

== Awards ==
- 2019 Sheikh Zayed Book Award: Literary and Art Criticism Award.
