= Sarah Al-Hardiniyya =

Lebanese Maronite hermitess

Sarah Al-Hardiniyya was a Lebanese Maronite hermitess. She was the first recorded hermitess in Lebanon. The Maronite Patriarch Jeremias II al-Amshitti recorded that she died on August 10, 1199, AD with the "odor of sanctity" in the hermitage of St. Sarkis al-Qarn in Hardine, Lebanon.
