= Beit Chlala =

Village in Batroun District, Lebanon

Beit Chelala بيت شلالا
- Village
- Location in Lebanon
- Coordinates: 34°13′20″N 35°50′13″E
- Country: Lebanon
- Governorate: North Governorate
- District: Batroun
- Elevation: 2,000 ft (600 m)
- Time zone: UTC+2 (EET)
  - Summer (DST): +3

Beit Chelala (Arabic: بيت شلالا, romanized: Bayt Shlālā) is a village located in the Batroun District of the North Governorate in Lebanon.

== History ==
Beit Chelala was founded by the Chelala family (in Arabic Shalala) more than four generations ago.

Some descendants of the founding family have migrated to Australia, Europe along with The Americas and have prospered in various fields.

Several families who were farm labourers changed their family name to "Shalala" after migrating to Australia from the late 1940s. They are not from the founding Chelala / Shalala family and bare no physical resemblance to them or their descendants.

== Demographics ==
In 2014 Christians made up 97.33% of registered voters in Beit Chelala. 90.88% of the voters were Maronite Catholics.
