= Mrah Ez Ziyat =

Village in Batroun District, Lebanon

Mrah Ez Ziyat مراح الزيات
- Village
- Location within Lebanon
- Coordinates: 34.2171107°N 35.7022126°E
- Country: Lebanon
- Governorate: North Lebanon
- District: Batroun
- Elevation: 300 m (980 ft)
- Time zone: UTC+2 (EET)
  - Summer (DST): UTC+3 (EEST)
- Dialing code: +961

Mrah Ez Ziyat (Arabic: مراح الزيات, romanized: Mrāḥ ez-Ziyāt), sometimes spelled Mrah Ez Zaiat, Mrah Ez Zayat or Mrah El Zaiyat, is a village in Batroun District, North Governorate, Lebanon.

== Demographics ==
In 2014 Christians made up 99.18% of registered voters in Mrah Ez Ziyat. 95.08% of the voters were Maronite Catholics.
