= Kfar Chleymane =

Village in Batroun District, Lebanon

Kfar Chleymane كفر شليمان
- Village
- Location within Lebanon
- Coordinates: 34°13′58″N 35°46′28″E
- Country: Lebanon
- Governorate: North Governorate
- District: Batroun District
- Time zone: UTC+2 (EET)
  - Summer (DST): UTC+3 (EEST)
- Dialing code: +961

Kfar Chleymane (Arabic: كفر شليمان, romanized: Kfar Shlaymān), also Kfarchleiman, is a small village of the Batroun District in the north of Lebanon located 16 km from Batroun and 69 km from Beirut.

== Etymology ==
According to Anis Freiha's "A Dictionary of the Names of Towns and Villages in Lebanon", Kfar Chleymane comes from Syriac and means The Village of Sleiman.

== Demographics ==
In 2014 Christians made up 100% of registered voters in Kfar Chleymane. 93.83% of the voters were Maronite Catholics. Kfar Chleimane's population is very small, consisting mainly of members of the Bassil family, which is believed to originate from Dinniyeh region near Tripoli.

== Church ==
The Our Lady of Naya church is the only one in Kfar Chleymane and is known for its 12th century vestige. Frescoes representing the Christ or other Christian scenes can be found in a little cave carved in the stone under the church. Parts of the frescoes were burnt by mistake before their historical importance was discovered. Moreover, the stones around the church are carved into stairs that can also be dated to the 12th century.

== Legend ==
An ancient legend says that under the soil of the church exists a hidden convent, but nobody knows if those legends are true and no researches were ever led.
