= Dahr Abi Yaghi =

Village in Batroun District, Lebanon

Dahr Abi Yaghi ضهر أبي ياغي
- Village
- Location within Lebanon
- Coordinates: 34.19005°N 35.726675°E
- Country: Lebanon
- Governorate: North Lebanon
- District: Batroun

Area
  - Total: 0.78 km^{2} (0.30 sq mi)
- Elevation: 500 m (1,600 ft)
- Time zone: UTC+2 (EET)
  - Summer (DST): UTC+3 (EEST)
- Dialing code: +961

Dahr Abi Yaghi (Arabic: ضهر أبي ياغي, romanized: Ḍahr ʾAbī Yāghī) is a village in Batroun District, North Governorate, Lebanon. It is geographically located on the southern border of the North Governorate near the village of Masrah. There were 138 voters in the town during the 2009 legislative elections, 148 voters in 2014 and 151 voters in 2017. It is a Maronite village.

== Demographics ==
In 2014 Christians made up 97.97% of registered voters in Dahr Abi Yaghi. 87.16% of the voters were Maronite Catholics.
