= Toula, Batroun =

Village in Batroun District, Lebanon

Toula تولا
- Village
- Location within Lebanon
- Coordinates: 34°11′59.7″N 35°43′29.8″E
- Country: Lebanon
- Governorate: North Lebanon
- District: Batroun
- Highest elevation: 760 m (2,490 ft)
- Lowest elevation: 460 m (1,510 ft)

Population (2007)
  - Total: 650
- Time zone: UTC+2 (EET)
  - Summer (DST): UTC+3 (EEST)
- Dialing code: +961

Toula (Arabic: تولا, romanized: Tūlā) is a village in Batroun District, North Governorate, Lebanon, 15 km far from Batroun. Situated at an altitude ranging from 460 meters above sea level at its lowest point, to 760 metres. It is known for its olive oil and figs. The residents are Christians. Its St-Doméce's (Mar Doumit) parish church dates back to 1270, it was restored in 1921 and has beautiful stone vaults inside. There are also the Slayyeb church and Mar Aabda's church.

== Geography ==
- Elevation: 650 m
- Distance from Beirut: 61 km
- Distance from Tripoli: 43 km
- Distance from Batroun: 15 km

== Demographics ==
In 2014 Christians made up 100% of registered voters in Toula. 90.69% of the voters were Maronite Catholics.
