= Hardine =

Settlement in Batroun District, North Lebanon Governorate, Lebanon

Hardîne حردين
- village
- Etymology: Syriac origin, "Hardin", meaning "terrorized" or "Hor Din", meaning "the judge's supervision"; Syriac origin, "Pious" or "Witness of Justice"
- Location within Lebanon
- Coordinates: 34°14′12″N 35°51′31″E
- Country: Lebanon
- Governorate: North Lebanon Governorate
- District: Batroun District

Hardîne (Arabic: حردين, romanized: Ḥardīn), sometimes written Ḩardīn, is a village in Batroun District, North Lebanon Governorate, Lebanon. Notable structures include the Temple of Mercury, severely damaged by an earthquake, and several Christian churches and monasteries.

== Demographics ==
In 2014 Christians made up 99.63% of registered voters in Hardîne. 94.30% of the voters were Maronite Catholics.

== History ==
According to jesuit father Louis Cheikho, Hardine is one of the first Christian settlements in Mount-Lebanon. It was home for 4 Patriarchs for over 140 years. Legend has it that fifteen Maronite nuns leaped from the Hardine cliff, choosing to embrace death rather than succumb to the dishonor of being captured by Mameluke soldiers during their campaigns.

== Notable people from Hardîne ==
- Sarah Al-Hardiniyya, first Maronite hermitess of Lebanon
- Benjamin of Hardin, Maronite muqaddam who fought and died in the Kisrawan campaigns (1292–1305)
- Nimatullah Kassab (1808-1858), named a saint by the Roman Catholic church
- Joseph Assaf, Australian ethnic marketing executive
