= Kfifan =

Village in Batroun District, Lebanon

Kfifan كفيفان
- Village
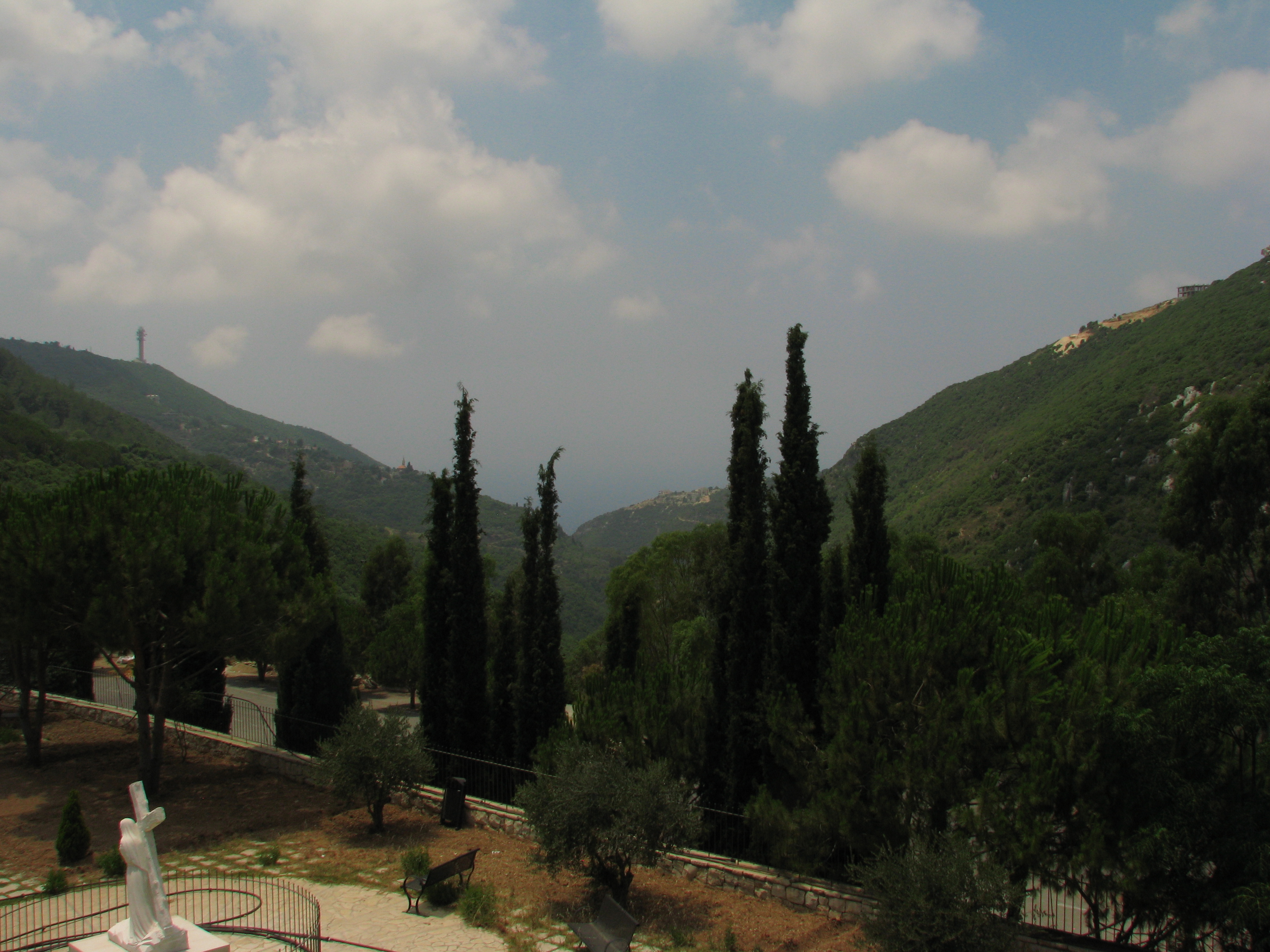

- Location within Lebanon
- Coordinates: 34°13′50″N 35°43′07″E
- Country: Lebanon
- Governorate: North Governorate
- District: Batroun District

Kfifan (Arabic: كفيفان), alternatively spelled Kfifane, is a village in the Batroun District of the North Governorate in Lebanon.

== Demographics ==
In 2014 Christians made up 85.01% of registered voters in Kfifan and Muslims made up 14.30%. 80.28% of the voters were Maronite Catholics and 13.84% were Sunni Muslims.

== Monastery ==
In the village there is a monastery named The Monastery of Kfifan, dedicated to Saints Cyprian and Justina. The Lebanese saint Nimatullah Kassab lived and died in this monastery and the other Maronite saint Charbel Makhlouf spent some years there. Inside the monastery there are the tomb of Saint Nimatullah and the remains of Blessed Stefano Nehmè.
