= Ras Nhash =

Town in Batroun District, Lebanon

Ras Nhash راس نحاش
- Municipality
- Location in Lebanon
- Coordinates: 34°16′58″N 35°42′54″E
- Country: Lebanon
- Governorate: North Governorate
- District: Batroun

Area
  - Total: 3.83 km^{2} (1.48 sq mi)
- Elevation: 300 m (980 ft)
- Time zone: UTC+2 (EET)
  - Summer (DST): UTC+3 (EEST)

Ras Nhash (Arabic: راس نحاش, romanized: Rās Nḥash), also spelled Ras Nahache or Ras Nahhach, is a town and municipality located in the Batroun District of the North Governorate in Lebanon. It is about 65 kilometres (40 mi) north of Beirut. It has an average elevation of 300 metres (980 ft) above sea level and a total land area of 383 hectares. It is located immediately north of the Chekka cape. Ras Nhash's inhabitants are Sunni Muslims.

== History ==
The Ottomans, who ruled the area of modern Lebanon from 1517 until 1918, settled Sunni Muslim Kurds at Ras Nhash and other villages in the wider Koura area south of Tripoli in 1588 to protect its coast from European naval incursions. The best known Kurdish emir of Ras Nhash was a certain Musa, who was the closest local ally of Yusuf Sayfa, the on–and–off governor of Tripoli in 1579–1625.

== Demographics ==
In 2014 Muslims made up 98.24% of registered voters in Ras Nhash. 96.49% of the voters were Sunni Muslims.

== Bibliography ==
- Abu-Husayn, Abdul-Rahim (1985). Provincial Leaderships in Syria, 1575-1650. Beirut: American University of Beirut.
