= Albert Mansour =

Lebanese politician

Albert Sami Mansour (Arabic: ألبير منصور) is a Lebanese politician. Mansour was born in 1939 to a Greek Catholic family. He was elected to parliament from the Baalbek-Hermel constituency in the 1972 Lebanese general election. He served as the treasurer of the Lebanese National Movement.

Mansour took part in drafting the Taif Agreement, and was named Minister of Defense afterwards. He contested, unsuccessfully, the 1992, 1996, 2000 and 2005 elections but was re-elected in the 2018 elections.
