= Zan, Lebanon =

Village in Batroun District, Lebanon

Zan زان
- Village
- St. John the Baptist Church, Square and Oak Tree in the village of Zan, Batroun

- Location within Lebanon
- Coordinates: 34.2239721°N 35.7556438°E
- Country: Lebanon
- Governorate: North Lebanon
- District: Batroun
- Elevation: 580 m (1,900 ft)
- Time zone: UTC+2 (EET)
  - Summer (DST): UTC+3 (EEST)
- Dialing code: +961

Zan (Arabic: زان, romanized: Zān) is a village in the Batroun District of the North Governorate of Lebanon. It lies at an elevation of approximately 580 meters above sea level and is part of the Federation of Batroun Municipalities.

== Etymology ==
The name comes from the Syriac word zayno, meaning 'weapon'.

== Demographics ==
There are 160 houses in the town with 760 people. The majority of the population is Maronite. In 2014 Christians made up 99.73% of registered voters in Zan. 96.62% of the voters were Maronite Catholics.

== History and Heritage ==
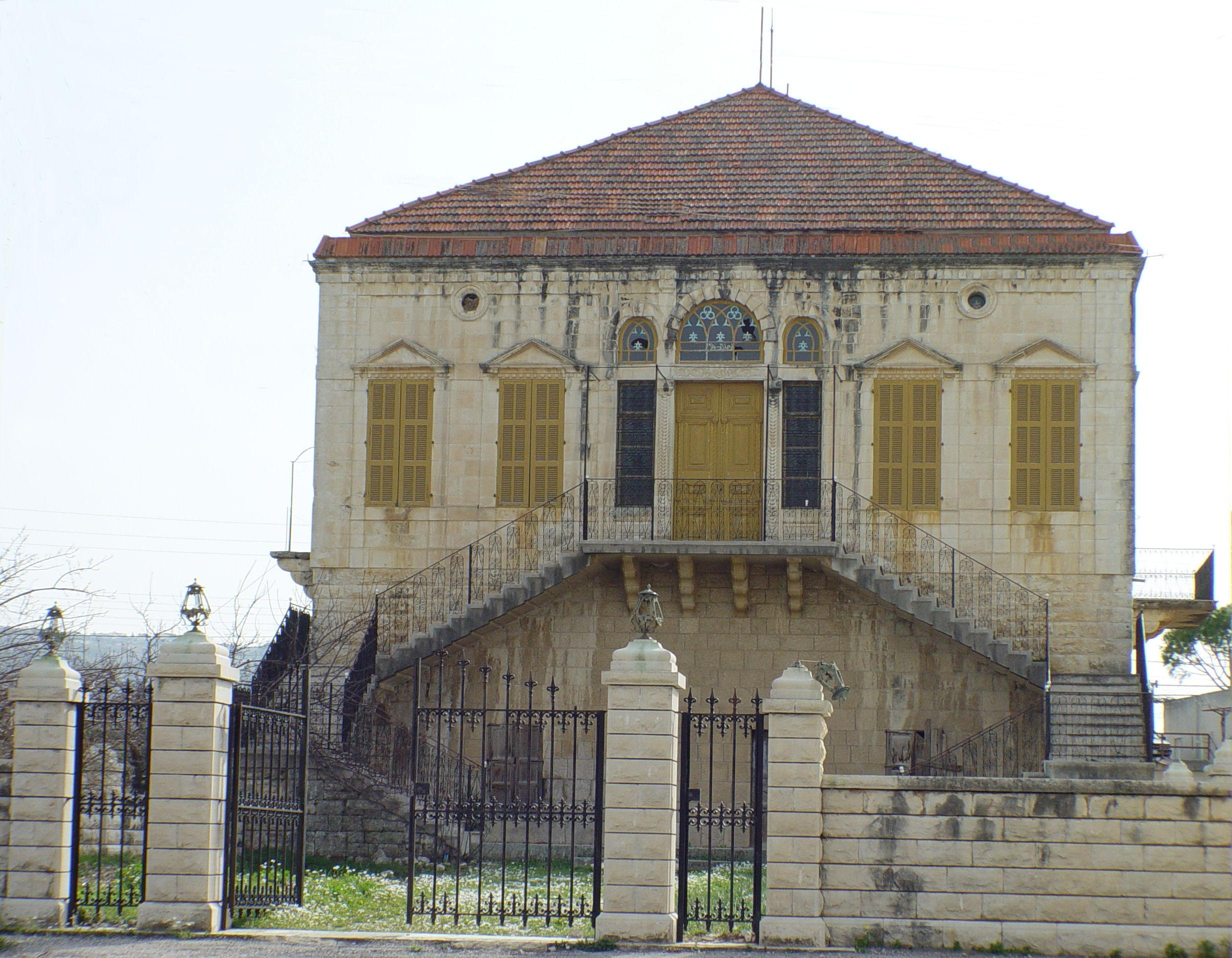
Rachwan Traditional Lebanese House

Zan is considered a traditional village of the Batroun district, characterized by its preserved rural environment, stone-built houses and churches, and historical architecture.

At the center of the village stands an old square serving as a gathering place for residents and featuring:

- The Church of Saint John the Baptist
- A centuries-old oak tree
- A traditional Lebanese house dating back to 1860
