= Deir Billa =

Village in Batroun District, Lebanon

Deir Billa ديربلا
- Municipality
- Location within Lebanon
- Coordinates: 34.2471386°N 35.8141883°E
- Country: Lebanon
- Governorate: North Governorate
- District: Batroun District
- Elevation: 680 m (2,230 ft)
- Time zone: UTC+2 (EET)
  - Summer (DST): UTC+3 (EEST)
- Dialing code: +06

Deir Billa (Arabic: دير بيلاَ, romanized: Dayr Bīllā) is a municipality in the Batroun District, North Governorate of Lebanon. The village is located near the towns of Wata Fares and Daael. The municipality is member of Federation of Bcharreh District Municipalities. In 2009, there were 759 voters in the town and that number rose to 805 in 2014.

== Demographics ==
In 2014 Christians made up 81.49% of registered voters in Deir Billa and Muslims made up 18.51%. 75.78% of the voters were Maronite Catholics and 17.02% were Shiite Muslims.
