= Kfar Abida =

Village in Batroun District, Lebanon

Fadous Kfar Aabida _ Fadous كفرعبيدا _ فدعوس
- Village
- Interactive map of Fadous
- Country: Lebanon
- Governorate: North Governorate
- District: Batroun District
- Elevation: 660 ft (200 m)

Population (2007)
  - Total: 9,613
- Postal code: 4107

Tell Fadous
- Fadaous
- Location within Lebanon
- 34.226389°N 35.66°E
- Type: Flint factory
- Cultures: Qaraoun
- Location: 2 kilometres (1.2 mi) south of Batroun, Lebanon
- Region: North Governorate
- Part of: Tell Fadous

Site notes
- Length: 800 meters
- Archaeologists: Maurice Tallon, Dörte Rokitta-Krumnow
- Public access: Yes

Kfar Abida_Fadous (Arabic كفرعبيدا _فدعوس), sometimes spelled Kfar Aabida_Fadaous or Kfaraabida_Fad'ous, is a village located 2 kilometres (1.2 mi) south of Batroun in the Batroun District of the North Governorate in Lebanon.

== History ==
=== Neolithic ===
Located south of the tell, is Fadous -Sud, a Heavy Neolithic site of the Qaraoun culture.

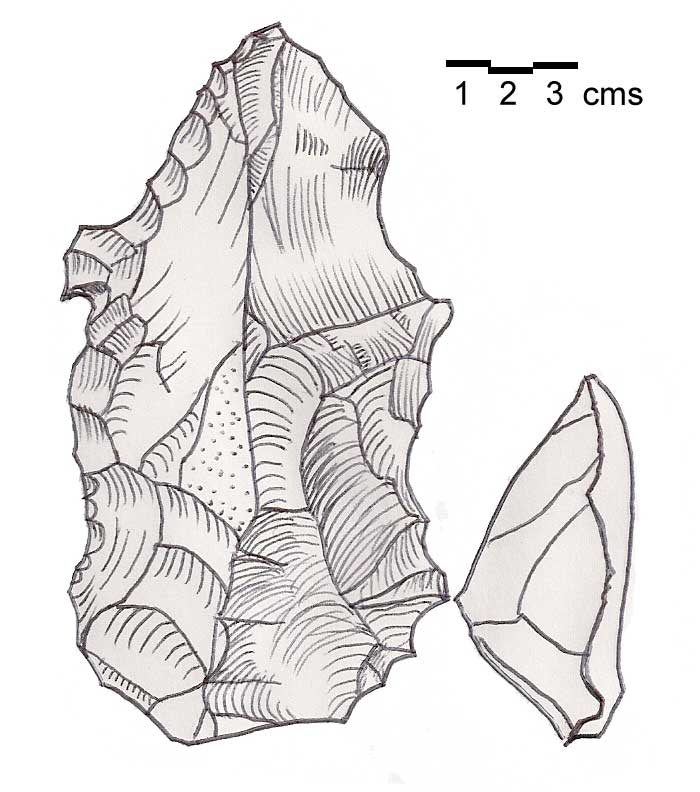
Neolithic flint tools from the Qaraoun culture.

=== Bronze Age (Tell Fadous ) ===
==== Early Bronze ====
On the coast, in the southwest of the town, lies an archaeological tell, Tell Fadous. The site may have been part of Byblos (12 km) to the south. Ceramic and architectural similaritiies are found from Sidon in the south to Tell Arqa in the north.

Phase III (EB II) shows a regular layout of the settlement with buildings separated by narrow streets.

Phase IV (EB III) has a different layout where the buildings are spaced farther apart.

== Demographics ==
In 2014 Christians made up 99.39% of registered voters in Kfar Abida _ Fadous . 92.54% of the voters were Maronite Catholics.
