= Boqsmaiya =

Village in Batroun District, Lebanon

Boqsmaiya بقسميّا
- Village
- Location within Lebanon
- Coordinates: 34.2511722°N 35.7656352°E
- Country: Lebanon
- Governorate: North Lebanon
- District: Batroun

Area
  - Total: 2.64 km^{2} (1.02 sq mi)
- Elevation: 450 m (1,480 ft)

Population
  - Total: 633
  - Density: 240/km^{2} (621/sq mi)
- Time zone: UTC+2 (EET)
  - Summer (DST): UTC+3 (EEST)
- Dialing code: +06 or +03
- Website: boxmaya.com

Boqsmaiya (Arabic: بقسميّا), also spelled Boxmaya or Boqsmaiyya, is a village located in the Batroun District, North Governorate. As of 2018, the municipality board president is Simon Kabalan Fares, the vice president is Semaan Khaddah, and the Mukhtar is Joseph Fahim Abi Fadel. The upper boundary of the village is created from the Nahr al-Jaouz river and the town uses the Ghawawit spring for their water. The Saint Simon Amoudi Church, named after St Simeon the Stylite, was built in 1910, with the stones of the Bacchus Temple.

== Demographics ==
In 2014 Christians made up 98.53% of registered voters in Boqsmaiya. 91.42% of the voters were Maronite Catholics.
