= Douma, Lebanon =

Village in Batroun District, Lebanon

Douma دوما Duma
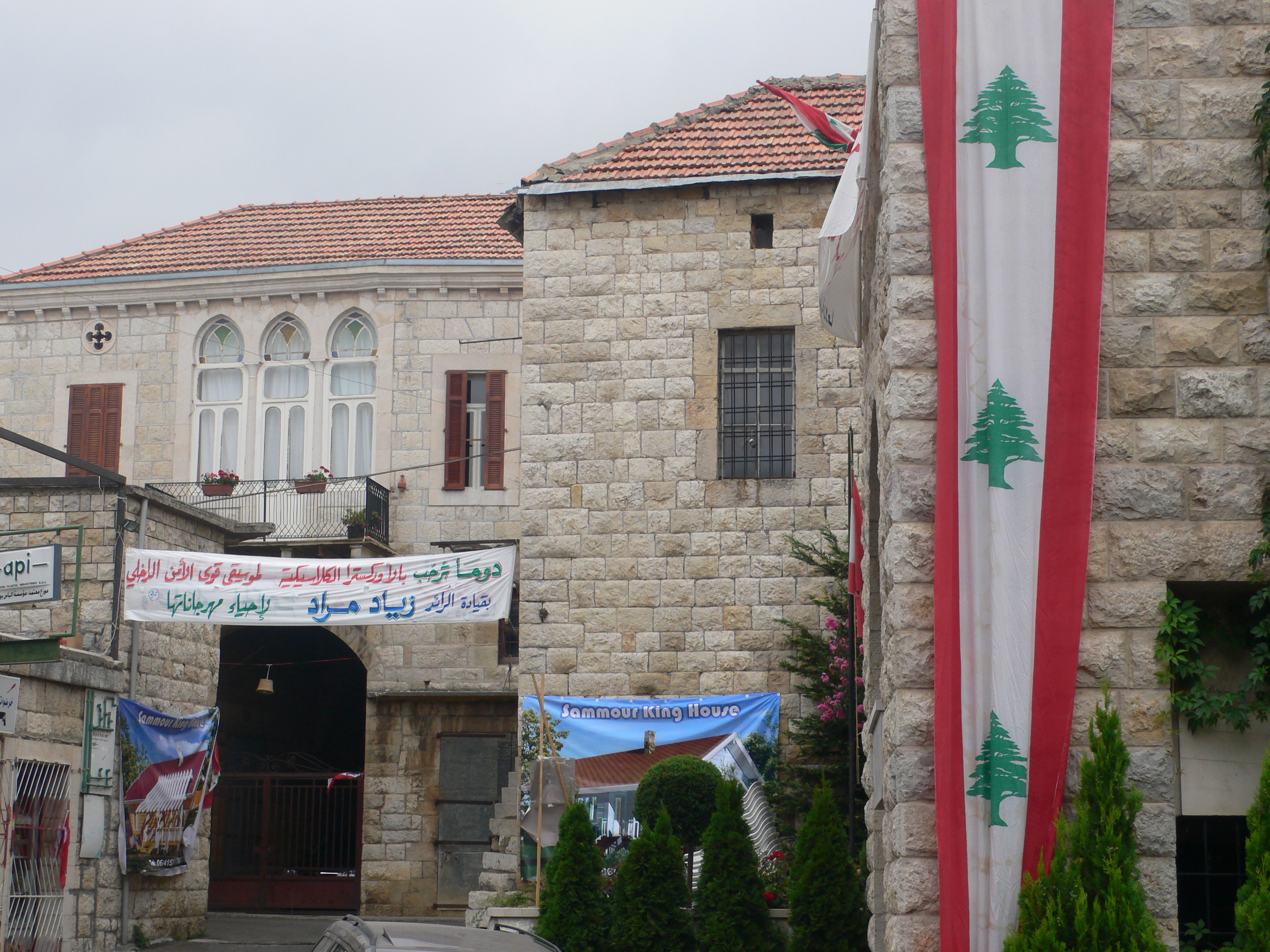
- Center of Douma, 2009
- Nickname: Douma al-Hadid (the Iron Douma)
- Location in Lebanon
- Country: Lebanon
- Governorate: North
- District: Batroun
- Founder: chalhoub clan

Government
- Elevation: 1,070 m (3,510 ft)

Douma (Arabic: دوما, romanized: Dūmā) is a village in Lebanon located 88 km from Beirut, 30 km from Byblos and 45 km from Tripoli. Douma is administratively part of Batroun District and is known for its location in a valley surrounded by mountains. It stands at an altitude of 1070 m. Almost all of its houses are covered in red tiles. It has a temperate climate and an abundance of vineyards and olive and apple groves.

== History ==
Douma was populated since ancient times. In the town square sits a sarcophagus, bearing a Greek inscription recording that this was the burial place of Castor, who died in 317 AD. The village was almost abandoned until the 16th century, during Ottoman rule, when the modern village was founded by the Christian Maalouf and Chalhoub Families. The families continue to inhabit the village until the present day. In 1880 the Ottoman mutasarrif of Mount Lebanon, Rustum Pasha, appointed a municipal council to administer Douma, the sixth locality to receive a council in Mount Lebanon.

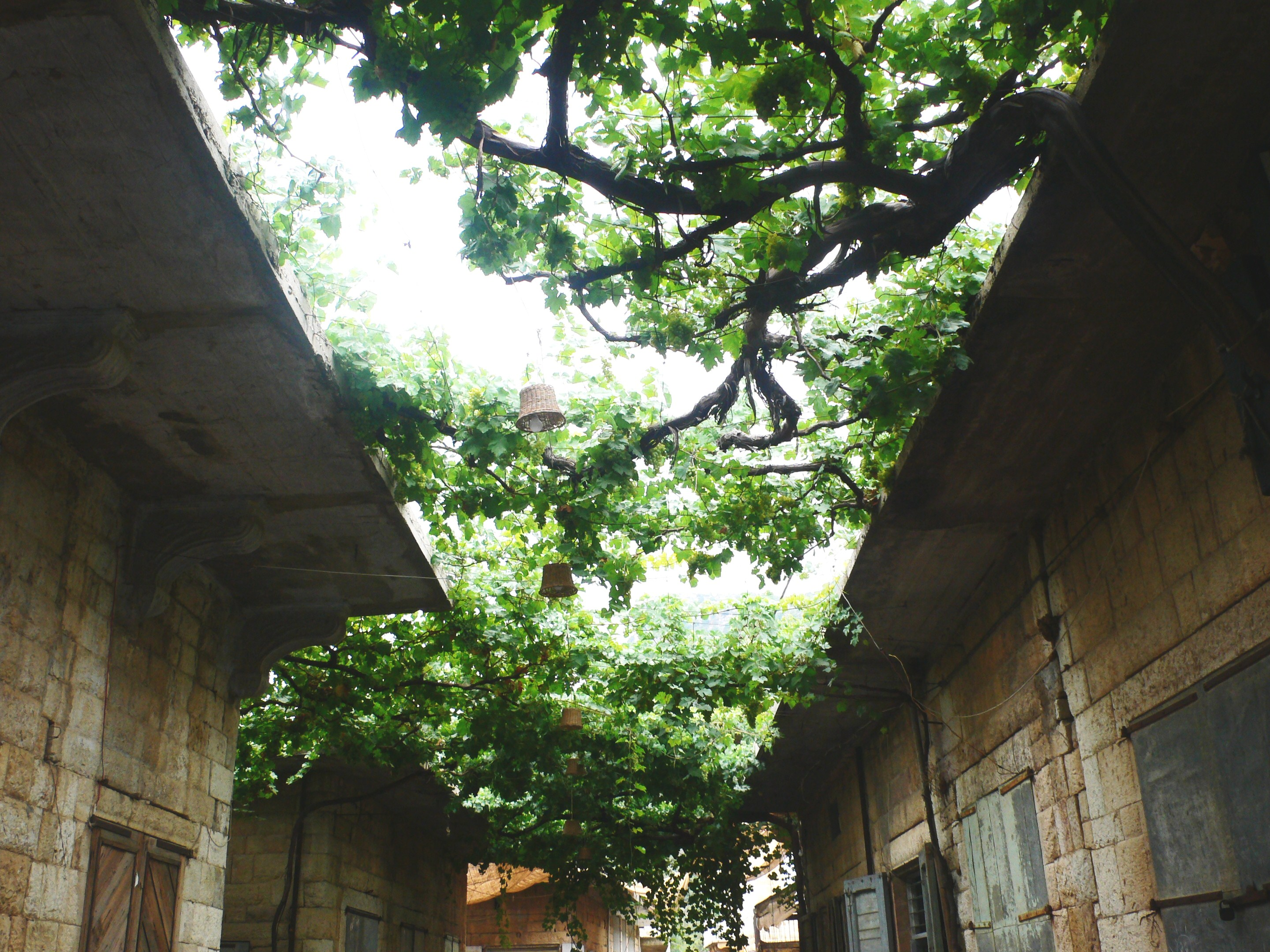
A road in Douma, 2009

The Great Famine of Mount Lebanon during World War I precipitated a wave of emigrants from Douma to the Americas and their remittances significantly contributed to boosting the village's economy. Most infrastructure and houses in Douma were built between 1881 and 1914, largely financed by emigrants from the village in Brazil, Argentina and the United States of America. In the 1920s, the leaders of Syria who had just rebelled against the French Mandatory rule, were detained and exiled to Douma of Lebanon. One of those leaders was Sa’dallah al-Jabiri who was destined to become Syria's first Prime Minister after its independence in the 1940s. Another one was a main author of Syria's constitution: lawyer Safadi.

During the 1915 Ottoman Syria locust infestation, the local St John Monastery spent 522 Ottoman kuruş in order to protect its wheat fields.

Starting even before the 1920s, emigrants from Douma had settled in thirteen countries across five continents.

== Name ==
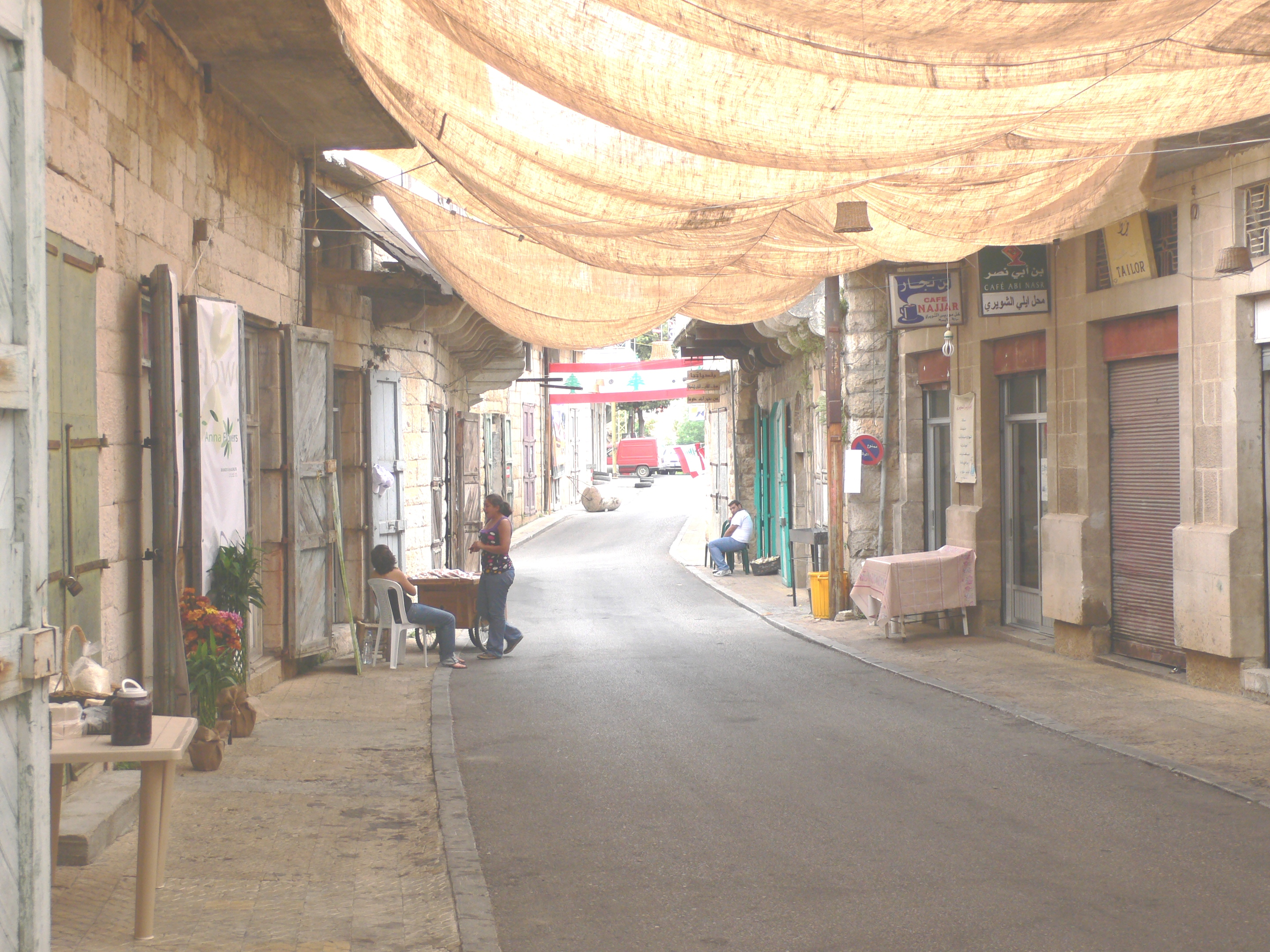
Douma's Main Street

Douma is also named Dūma al-Hadīd (literally "Douma of iron" or "Iron Douma") due to the abundance of iron found in its soil and the superior craftsmanship of its blacksmiths. The arming industry established under Ibrahim Pasha's rule encouraged many people from Choueir to come and settle in Douma since opportunities of work were plentiful at the time.

== Demographics ==
In 2014 Christians made up 99.10% of registered voters in Douma. 48.95% of the voters were Greek Orthodox, 33.20% were Melkite Catholics and 15.57% were Maronite Catholics.

== Climate ==
Douma has a Mediterranean climate. Rainfall is higher in winter than in summer. The Köppen-Geiger climate classification is Csa. The average annual temperature in Douma is 15.2 °C (59.4 °F). About 1,210 mm (47.64 in) of precipitation falls annually.

Climate data for Douma
Month	Jan	Feb	Mar	Apr	May	Jun	Jul	Aug	Sep	Oct	Nov	Dec	Year
Mean daily maximum °C (°F)	10.7 (51.3)	11.0 (51.8)	13.8 (56.8)	18.9 (66.0)	23.4 (74.1)	27.2 (81.0)	29.5 (85.1)	30.1 (86.2)	27.2 (81.0)	23.6 (74.5)	17.9 (64.2)	13.3 (55.9)	20.6 (69.0)
Mean daily minimum °C (°F)	2.8 (37.0)	3.1 (37.6)	4.7 (40.5)	8.1 (46.6)	11.6 (52.9)	14.7 (58.5)	16.4 (61.5)	17.2 (63.0)	14.7 (58.5)	12.3 (54.1)	8.4 (47.1)	4.9 (40.8)	9.9 (49.8)
Average precipitation mm (inches)	265 (10.4)	222 (8.7)	202 (8.0)	87 (3.4)	35 (1.4)	2 (0.1)	1 (0.0)	1 (0.0)	9 (0.4)	43 (1.7)	124 (4.9)	219 (8.6)	1,210 (47.6)
Source: Climate-Data.org, Climate data

== Twin towns ==
- Digne-les-Bains, France
