= Niha, Batroun =

Village in Batroun District, Lebanon

Niha نيحا
- Village
- Location within Lebanon
- Coordinates: 34.2305652°N 35.8860564°E
- Country: Lebanon
- Governorate: North Lebanon
- District: Batroun
- Elevation: 1,350 m (4,430 ft)
- Time zone: UTC+2 (EET)
  - Summer (DST): UTC+3 (EEST)
- Dialing code: +961

Niha (Arabic: نيحا, romanized: Nīḥā) is a village in Batroun District, North Governorate, Lebanon.

== Demographics ==
In 2014 Christians made up 99.43% of registered voters in Niha. 95.51% of the voters were Maronite Catholics.
