= Tannourine =

Town in Batroun District, Lebanon

Tannourine تنورين
- Town
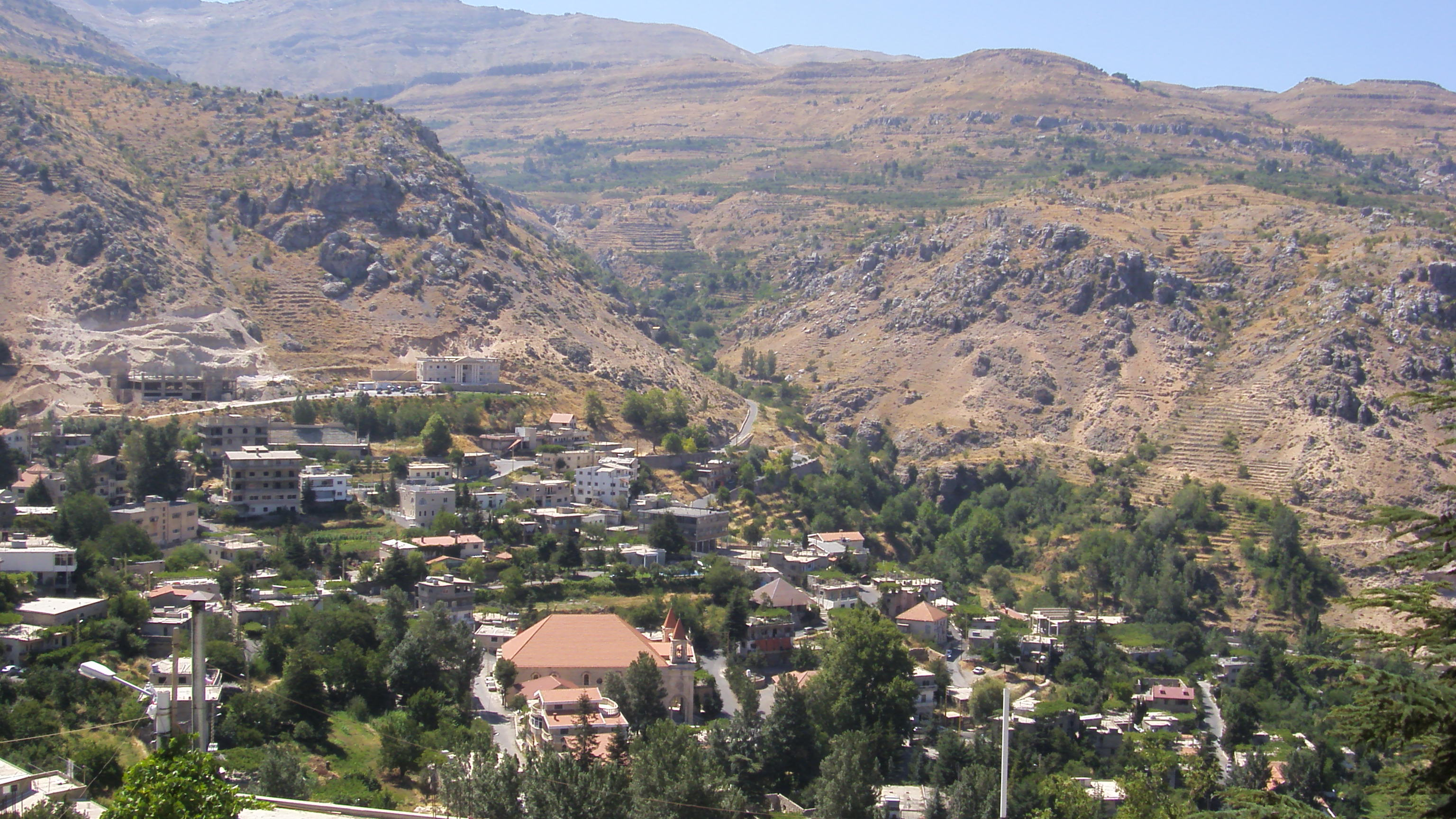
- Tannourine

- Location within Lebanon
- Coordinates: 34°11′00″N 35°54′11″E
- Country: Lebanon
- District: Batroun

Area
  - Total: 95 km^{2} (37 sq mi)

Population (2018)
  - Total: 25,000
- Time zone: UTC+2 (Beirut)
  - Summer (DST): +3
- Area code: +961 (06)

Tannourine (Arabic: تنورين, romanized: Tanūrīn, also Tannoureen, Tannorine) is a Lebanese town located in the Batroun District, part of the Governorate of North Lebanon, 80 km from the capital Beirut. Tannourine is formed by a cluster of mountain settlements located in the highs of the Batroun District, the largest of which is Tannourine El-Fawqa, followed by Chatine, Tannourine El-Tahta, and Wata Houb. Tannourine has a population of about 25,000.

Tannourine extends between the municipal borders of Douma and Yammoune, and between Aqoura to the south and Bsharri and Hadath El Jebbeh to the north. The town is close to the Kadisha Valley and Cedars of God UNESCO World Heritage Site, the Afqa grotto, the Baatara sinkhole, and the Nahr Ibrahim valley.

Tannourine lies in a collection of valleys and ravines accessible either from Douma, Kfour Al Arbe, a backroad from Bsharri or from a newly constructed highway direct from Batroun, or from Laqlouq.

== Etymology ==
Tannourine is the plural of the Syriac word tannour, which indicates an old stone oven. Tannourine's name may in fact stem from the local topography, which resembles the convex form of an oven called tannour, with the dual suffix ine as a reference to the two distinct areas of Tannourine Al-Tahta (literally Lower Tannourine) and Tannourine Al-Fawqa (literally Upper Tannourine).

== Climate ==
Climate data for Tannourine
Month	Jan	Feb	Mar	Apr	May	Jun	Jul	Aug	Sep	Oct	Nov	Dec	Year
Mean daily maximum °C (°F)	5 (41)	4 (39)	8 (46)	13 (55)	15 (59)	18 (64)	22 (72)	23 (73)	20 (68)	18 (64)	13 (55)	8 (46)	14 (57)
Daily mean °C (°F)	2 (36)	0 (32)	4 (39)	8 (46)	11 (52)	15 (59)	18 (64)	19 (66)	16 (61)	14 (57)	9 (48)	4 (39)	10 (50)
Mean daily minimum °C (°F)	−1 (30)	−3 (27)	0 (32)	3 (37)	8 (46)	12 (54)	14 (57)	15 (59)	12 (54)	9 (48)	5 (41)	0 (32)	6 (43)
Average precipitation mm (inches)	163 (6.4)	128 (5.0)	82 (3.2)	29 (1.1)	7 (0.3)	1 (0.0)	0 (0)	0 (0)	1 (0.0)	32 (1.3)	104 (4.1)	151 (5.9)	698 (27.3)
Average rainy days	15	13	10	5	2	0	0	0	0	5	9	12	71
Source: chinci

== Tannourine Cedar Reserve ==
The village also shares its name with Tannourine Cedar Forest Nature Reserve, a cedar forest of some 1,000,000 trees. Covering an area of 195.5 hectares at an altitude ranging between 1,300 and 1,800 meters. The Tannourine Cedars Forest Nature Reserve is considered the largest and densest cedar forests in Lebanon, with ninety percent of the trees in the forest being cedar trees. Other companion trees like Cupressus, Pinus, Abies, Populus and others constitute a very rich ecosystem in plant species. The fauna ranges from the various types of birds (eagles, owls, robins, etc...) to wild animals (hyenas, boars, squirrels, snakes and bats).

The reserve includes cliffs and caves, and its mountainous landscape is astonishing with cedars growing on extremely vertical slopes. These cedars can be seen along the road that goes north to Hadath al-Jebbeh, which, although in poor condition, winds its way through wild and isolated scenery up to the Kadisha Valley gorge, leading to Bsharri.

During the Lebanese war (1975-1990) land mines were spread in some parts of the forest, making it mostly inaccessible by the local communities and their herds. This ended-up protecting the forest: it was left relatively un-touched until a law dated 20/2/1999 established it as a protected area. The Lebanese Army cleared the forest of land mines. The reserve is now open to the public and hosts "Tannourine Cedars Night" an annual summer music festival.

== Villages and local attractions ==
The Village of Balaa (bordering Laqlouq) is known for its deep natural sink hole. A 300-meter walk brings you to a dizzying open cavern some 250 meters deep. Three natural bridges - of which the middle one is the most spectacular - complete the scene. In the spring, snow melt water forms the scenic 90m high Baatara gorge waterfall.

The Nahr-Al-Joze (the Joze being a species of trout that grows in the valley river) meanders through the valley and borders a number of restaurants, and creates a forest ecosystem higher up towards the source. Likewise, the river has formed a number of natural pools of clear water that can be explored higher up towards the source.

Tannourine is well known for its ancient Maronite monasteries; specifically the convents of Saint Shallitah and Saint Antonios Houb, the latter being located in the village of Wata Houb.

Also, among the rocky outcrops of Tannourine al-Tahta is located an ancient 500-year-old Lebanese house, believed to be one of the earliest examples of Lebanese architecture. That same house was on the cover of a National Geographic report on Lebanon. Until late 2008, the occupant of the house was the oldest living man in Lebanon. Dubbed "Massoud", he was reputed to be 109 years old.

== Churches and monasteries ==
In the late fifth century AD, Tannourine became a refuge for the Maronites. Some of the churches and monasteries include:

- Saint Chalitta Church - an archeological site from the Crusader period.
- Saint Sarkis Church - a Byzantine archaeological site. It had three markets and the vestibule was paved with a mosaic. It was constructed near the new church.
- The Church of the Assumption of Mary
- Saint Antonio monastery in Houb was built in 1749.
- Saint Peter church
- Saint Georges church

== Archaeological sites ==
Tannourine hosts a remarkably large number of monuments dating back to the Phoenician, Roman and Greek eras.

In the valley of Tannourine-Al-Tahta lies a nearly-intact Roman aqueduct and a decrepit reservoir and Roman Cistern at its side. It is a testament that the fertility of that valley was being exploited since at least the 1st century AD

Higher up in the mountains, in the now abandoned village of Ain al-Raha, are found a number of 6th century and Crusader-era churches that many scholars believe to be one of the earliest known proofs of the presence of Christianity in the upper Levant. Indeed, according to the legend, Ain al-Raha (literally: source of relief) was during the 11th to 13th century a safe haven for defeated Crusaders.

Also, above the previously mentioned old Lebanese house is an abandoned monastery sheltered in the hollow cave on the face of the mountain. It is believed that the 16th century remains were constructed in a way that it melded into the mountain to create a "camouflage" of sorts; and indeed unless you intend to search for it, you'd be hard-pressed to locate it immediately. Such caution was employed in order to thwart Ottoman army which wished to seize the Levant, which they eventually succeeded in doing.

In Wata Houb there are inscriptions on a rock dating back to the eighth century BC, the statues of a huge man between two smaller ones.

In St. Anthony's monastery in Houb, the remains of a Phoenician temple are preserved. In 1936 the remains of a structure with an elaborate stone sculpture were found and a large font was used to save the blood of the victims. This is all in the middle of a paved opening with stone seats around. It was also found among the rubble, icons inscribed with the name of Alexander the Great and drawings of the god, Jupiter, carrying a lightning symbol in his right hand and a scepter in his left. The other read, "Iskandar, the King and the God and the compassionate father" in addition to the drawings of an eagle and the heads of a man and a woman with the words " the 2 Gods are brothers." There are also writings glorifying the Roman Emperor Hadrian and other writings cautioning from cutting certain types of trees; in addition to pools, restrooms, and forts built to protect convoys from nomadic invasions. In Tannourine, there is today a Roman wall which marks the boundary between Tannourine and Aqoura.

The Romans also built an observatory called Aytamout observatory, which was overlooking the neighboring areas to address those who come to cut the trees. The Greek monuments included icons of the goddess Isis, the goddess and protector of navigation. She has two horns and she is carrying in her hand an Ankh with Greek letters of "Byblos".

== History ==
Tannourine was inhabited since the Phoenician and Roman times. However, there is no conclusive evidence that it was a continuous presence or a discontinued one. Nor is there any evidence to prove whether this presence left an impact biologically and genetically on other people who came later to Tannourine. Based on the manuscript from the 17th century of Father Peter Matar in 1650 and the manuscript from the late 16th century of Father Al Maadi in 1599, several families lived in Tannourine in the thirteenth century, before the Mamluks attack on Mount Lebanon. The most prominent of these families are Matar (مطر ), Ghoch (غوش), Chamoun (شمعون), Harik (حريق), Sadka (صدقه) and Laya (لايا), Chaiban (شيبان).

Between 1268 and 1306 the Mamluks attacked Mount Lebanon in a "discipline" campaign in the region. Many of these families dispersed, some of which were killed, and others emigrated and some hid in the many caves in the area of Tannourine.

The families that did not become extinct at that stage are Ghoch, Matar and Reaidy (Reaidy family is a branch from Al Matar family), as many of their descendants are still in Tannourine region.

As for the rest of the families that are currently stationed in Tannourine, most of them are the descendant of Gerges Abi Korkmaz the third, the actual Grandfather of more than 60% of the current people of tannourine.

Al Korkmaz main families are: Harb, Youness, Tarabay, Dagher, Yaacoub. It is worth mentioning that these families have branched into several families and names which are too many to state.↵

For the true origins of the Korkmaz the first, there are many stories. Some historians consider him from Slavic ethnic origins, Albanians. Turkish, or Baghdadian origins and that he was called khattar, and khattar means in the Arabic language, the "Spear holder". Also, Korkmaz means in the Turkish language "Fearless"↵.

At the beginning of the 20th century, many citizens of Tannourine travelled to Brazil fleeing the war, many were sent to the city of Araçuai - MG, where they received the last name Tanure, Tanuri, Tanury, Tannure, Tannouri and Tannoury.

== Economy ==
Tannourine is the site of Tannourine Natural Spring Mineral Water.

== Government and demographics ==
The newly constructed Tannourine Municipality building is located in Tannourine-Al-Fawqa, overlooking the town previously mentioned. A President of the Municipal Council is elected every 6 years along with a "list" of 18 cabinet members who are all subjected to a vote by the residents. It has relative administrative and financial independence but remains under the control, supervision and financing of the central government.

=== Religion ===
As of 2022, the religious make-up of the town's 6,391 registered voters were roughly 92.3% Maronite Catholics, 3.8% Greek Orthodox, 1.5% Greek Catholic, 0.6% Christian Minorities, and 1.8% others.

1. Maronite Catholics (92.3%)
2. Greek Orthodox (3.80%)
3. Greek Catholic (1.50%)
4. Christian Minorities (0.60%)
5. Others (1.80%)

== Notable people ==
- Assia Dagher (1908–1986), actress and film producer
- Julio Cesar Turbay (1916–2005), former president of Colombia in 1978
- Boutros Harb (born 1944), politician
- Charbel Dagher (born 1950), Lebanese academic
- Claude Comair (born 1958), co-founder of Nintendo Software Technology
- Pierre Dagher (born 1963), Lebanese actor and voice actor
- Shakira (born 1977), singer
  - Her paternal grandmother is from Tannourine, which Shakira visited in 2018. She was honored with a square in the Cedar Reserve named Shakira Isabel Mebarak, after her, in which a statue of the singer is intended to be added soon.
- Abeer Nehme (born 1980), singer and musicologist
- Maya Reaidy (born 1995), Miss Lebanon 2018
