= Batroun District =

Coordinates: 34°15′N 35°39′E

- District
- البترون
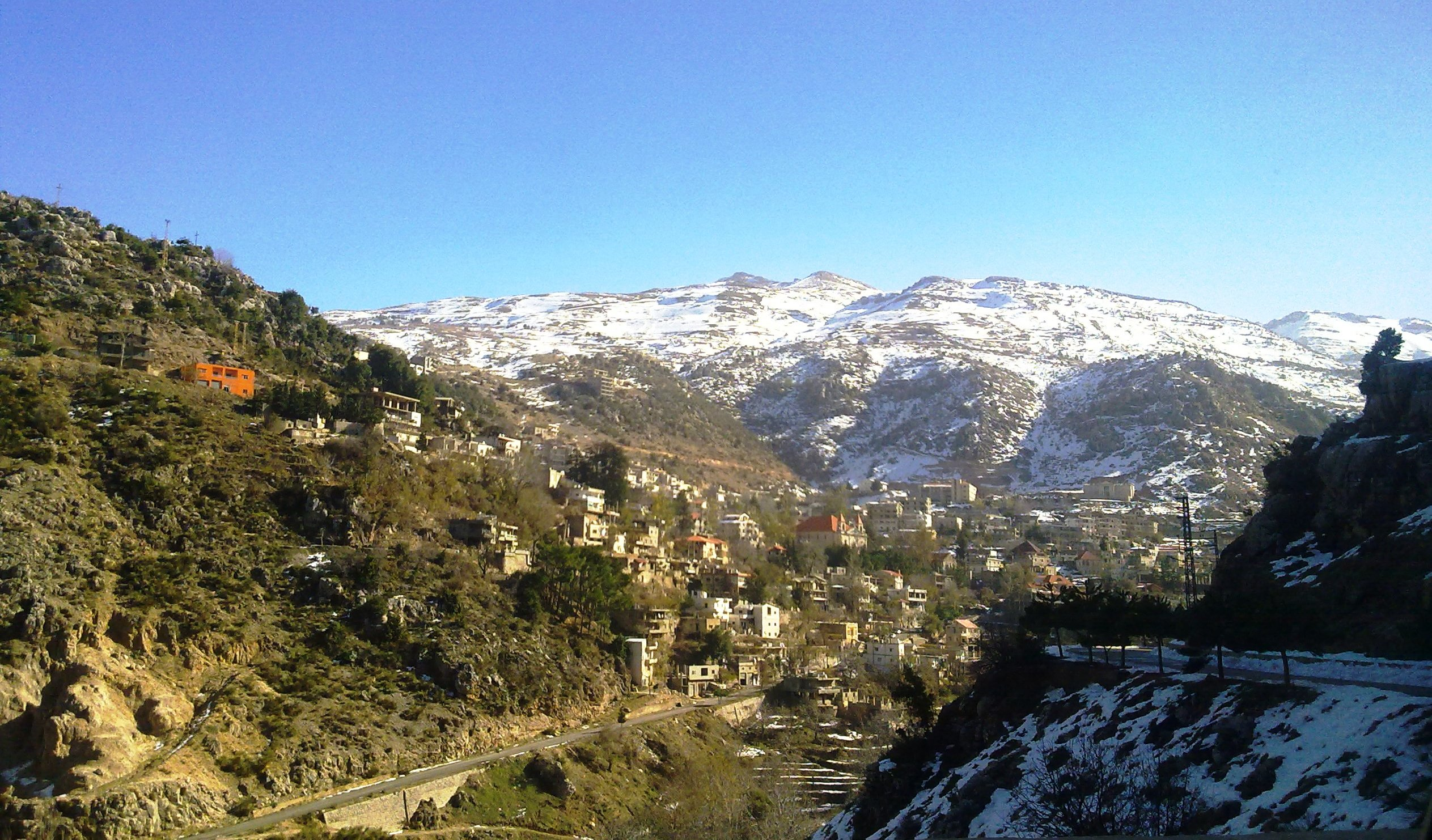
- Tannurin El Fawqa, Batroun District
- Nickname: Batroun
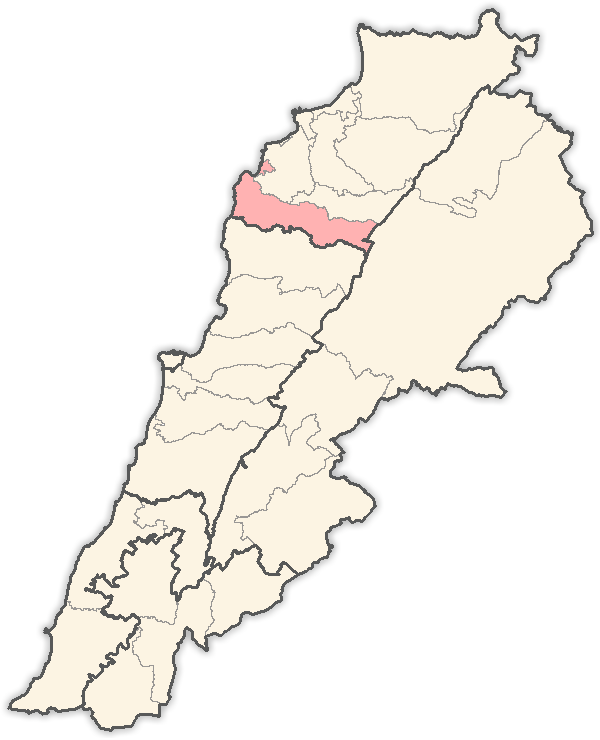
- Location in Lebanon
- Country: Lebanon
- Governorate: North Governorate
- Capital: Batroun

Area
  - Total: 111 sq mi (287 km^{2})

Population
  - Estimate (31 December 2017): 57,339
- Time zone: UTC+2 (EET)
  - Summer (DST): UTC+3 (EEST)

Batroun District (Arabic: البترون) is a district (qadaa) located in the North Governorate, Lebanon, south of Tripoli. Its capital is the city of Batroun, which is one of the oldest continuously inhabited cities in the world. Its natural borders are: in the south the al-Jaouz river and in the north the Madfoun river.

The region is known for its vineyards located at an altitude of 1,300 meters, which helps grow high-quality grapes that are used to make wines that are intense in color and full of flavor.

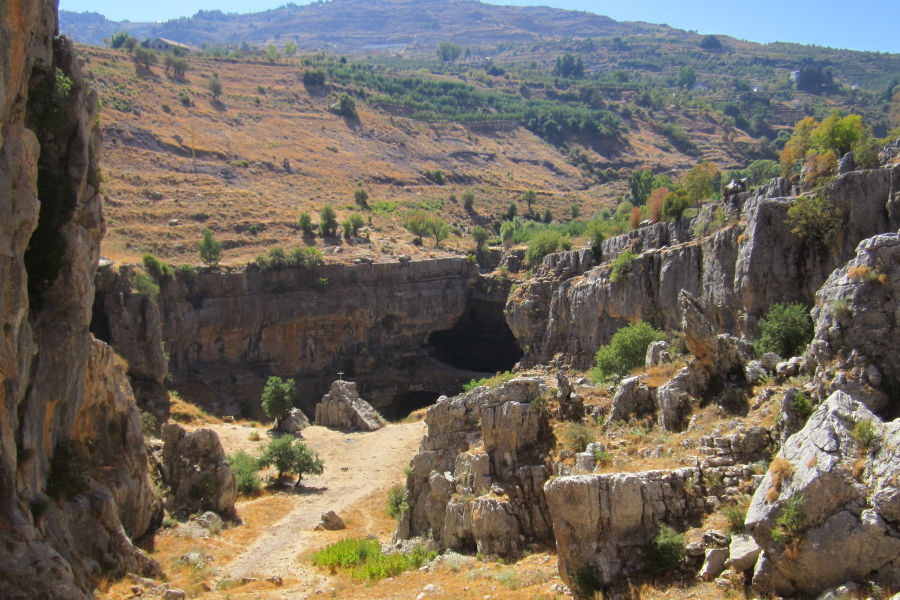
Balou Baatara, Batroun District

== Historical Significance ==
The district has a rich historical background, having been inhabited since ancient times. It was known as "Betrouna" by the Phoenicians and "Botrys" during the Greek-Roman era. Batroun was significantly affected by historical events such as earthquakes and Crusader conquests, which shaped its development.

== Cities and towns ==
Aabdelli	Aabrine	Aalali	Aaoura	Aartiz	Asia	
Batroun	Basbina	Bchaaleh	Beit Chlala	Beit Kassab	Bijdarfil	
Boqsmaiya	Chatine	Chekka	Chibtine	Daael	Dahr Abi Yaghi	
Darya	Deir Billa	Douma	Douq	Eddeh	Ftahat	Fadaaous
Ghouma	Hadtoun	Hamat	Harbouna	Hardine	Heri	
Hilta	Ijdabra	Jebla	Jrabta	Jran	Kandoula	
Kfarabida	Kfar Chleymane	Kfar Hatna	Kfar Hay	Kfar Hilda	Kfar Shlaimane	
Kfifane	Kfour El Arabi	Koubba	Kour	Madfoun	Mehmarch	
Mar Mama	Masrah	Mrah Chdid	Mrah Ez Ziyat	Nahla	Niha, Batroun	
Ouajh El Hajar	Ouata Houb	Qandola	Racha	Rachana	Rachkida	
Ram, Batroun	Ras Nahhach	Selaata	Sghar	Smar Jbeil	Sourat	
Tannourine El Faouqa	Thoum	Toula	Wata Hob	Zane		

== Demographics ==
According to registered voters in 2014:

Year	Christians					Muslims				Druze
Year	Total	Maronites	Greek Orthodox	Greek Catholics	Other Christians	Total	Sunnis	Shias	Alawites	Druze
2014	91.71%	69.86%	16.95%	3.33%	1.57%	7.82%	6.06%	1.68%	0.08%	0.01%
2018	91.92%	69.79%	16.75%	3.32%	2.06%	8.05%	6.26%	1.72%	0.07%	0.02%
2022	92.20%	71.31%	16.37%	3.22%	1.30%	7.8%	6.38%	1.40%	0.02%	0.00%
2026	92.08%	73.51%	15.95%	1.88%	0.74%	7.92%	6.72%	1.20%	0.00%	0.00%

Number of registered voters (21+ years old) over the years.

Years	Men	Women	Total	Growth (%)
2009	30,100	28,303	58,403	—N/a
2010	30,137 ▲	28,257 ▼	58,394 ▼	-0.01% ▼
2011	28,826 ▼	27,763 ▼	56,589 ▼	-3.19% ▼
2012	29,012 ▲	27,958 ▲	56,970 ▲	+0.67% ▲
2013	29,513 ▲	28,307 ▲	57,820 ▲	+1.47% ▲
2014	29,777 ▲	28,571 ▲	58,348 ▲	+0.90% ▼
2015	30,055 ▲	28,732 ▲	58,787 ▲	+0.75% ▼
2016	30,245 ▲	29,117 ▲	59,362 ▲	+0.97% ▲
2017	30,641 ▲	29,398 ▲	60,039 ▲	+1.13% ▲
2018	30,966 ▲	29,681 ▲	60,647 ▲	+1.00% ▼
2019	31,221 ▲	29,891 ▲	61,112 ▲	+0.76% ▼
2020	31,537 ▲	30,127 ▲	61,664 ▲	+0.90% ▲
2021	31,686 ▲	30,247 ▲	61,933 ▲	+0.43% ▼
2022	31,965 ▲	30,479 ▲	62,444 ▲	+0.82% ▲
2023	31,945 ▼	30,482 ▲	62,427 ▼	-0.03% ▼
2024	32,035 ▲	30,566 ▲	62,601 ▲	+0.28% ▲
2025	32,092 ▲	30,559 ▼	62,651 ▲	+0.08% ▼
2026	—N/a	—N/a	62,946 ▲	+0.47% ▲
Source: DGCS

== Sources ==
- (Mapquest)
