= Lebanese Forces – Executive Command =

Lebanese Forces splinter group

Lebanese Forces – Executive Command القوات اللبنانية - القيادة التنفيذية
- Leader: Elie Hobeika
- Dates active: 1986–1991
- Split from: Lebanese Forces
- Headquarters: Zahlé (Beqaa)
- Active regions: Beqaa valley, Beirut
- Size: 1,000–2,000 fighters
- Wars: Lebanese Civil War

The Lebanese Forces – Executive Command or LFEC (Arabic: القوات اللبنانية - القيادة التنفيذية | Al-Quwwat al-Lubnaniyya – Al-Qiyada Al-Tanfeethiyya), was a splinter group from the Lebanese Forces led by Elie Hobeika, based at the town of Zahlé in the Beqaa valley during the late 1980s. It was initially founded in January 1986 under the title Lebanese Forces – Uprising or LFU (Arabic: القوات اللبنانية - الانتفاضة | Al-Quwwat al-Lubnaniyya – Intifada), but later changed its designation.

== Origins ==
The LFU was formed by Hobeika at Zahlé out of his LF supporters, who sought refuge in the Syrian-controlled Beqaa after being ousted from east Beirut in January 1986 by the Lebanese Forces' faction led by Samir Geagea. Renamed Lebanese Forces – Executive Command later that year and financed by Syria, Hobeika and its men conveyed little or no support at all from the Greek-Catholic citizens of Zahlé, who preferred to lend their backing to the mainstream Lebanese Forces and later, to General Michel Aoun's interim military government.

== Structure and organization ==
Initially numbering just 600–700 fighters, the LFEC by the late 1980s aligned some 1,000 militiamen (although another source points a higher number, about 2,000), mostly Maronites, of which 300 operated in West Beirut whilst the remainder were kept in reserve at Zahlé. Apart from a few technicals armed with heavy machine-guns, recoilless rifles and anti-aircraft autocannons, the militia had no armoured vehicles nor artillery of their own but usually relied on the Syrian Army's 82nd Armoured Brigade stationed at the Beqaa for armour and artillery support.

== List of LFEC Commanders ==
- Elie Hobeika
- Georges Melko
- Maroun Machahalani
- Michel Zouen

== Illegal activities and controversy ==
Generally regarded as a pro-Syrian proxy faction, the LFEC became known for their lack of restraint and discipline, and involvement in profitable criminal activities – besides allowing his men to abduct and rape many of the local women, Hobeika ran from his Headquarters at the Hotel Qadiri in central Zahlé an illegal international telecommunications' center and a drug-trafficking ring that extended through the Beqaa Valley.

The group is suspected of being implicated in a series of bloody bomb attacks in the mid-1980s, namely the failed attempt made alongside the U.S. Central Intelligence Agency (CIA) and the pro-Israeli South Lebanon Army (SLA) to assassinate Sheikh Hussein Fadlallah of Hezbollah, which cost the life of his brother Jihad Fadlallah in March 1985 by a massive car-bomb explosion that also caused other 83 dead and 256 wounded. The subsequent car-bomb campaign that plagued both West and East Beirut from March to July 1986 was allegedly carried out by the LFEC in collusion with the Syrian military intelligence services.

== The LFEC in the Lebanese civil war 1986-1990 ==
During the 1989–1990 Liberation War they fought alongside Druze Progressive Socialist Party's People's Liberation Army (PSP/PLA) and pro-Syrian Palestinian National Salvation Front (PNSF) militias against General Michel Aoun's troops at the second battle of Souk El Gharb. They later assisted Syrian Social Nationalist Party (SSNP) militiamen and Syrian troops in the capture of Aoun's HQ at Baabda on October 13, 1990, where they fought successfully the Aounist 5th Infantry Brigade defending it, and reportedly committed atrocities and engaged in looting.

== Disbandment ==
Upon the end of the war in October 1990, LFEC militia units operating in Beirut and Zahlé were ordered by the Lebanese Government on March 28, 1991, to disband and surrender their heavy weaponry by April 30 as stipulated by the Taif Agreement. Although the LFEC was indeed disbanded, many of its former members went to provide the cadre for a private security company set up and headed by Hobeika until his death by a mysterious car bomb explosion near his house in the east Beirut suburb of Hazmiyeh on January 24, 2002. The LFEC is no longer active.

== See also ==
- January 1986 Lebanese Forces coup
- Lebanese Civil War
- List of weapons of the Lebanese Civil War
- Michel Murr
- Promise Party
- Tyous Team of Commandos
- Young Men (Lebanon)
- Zahliote Group
- 5th Infantry Brigade (Lebanon)
- 9th Infantry Brigade (Lebanon)
- 10th Infantry Brigade (Lebanon)
