= Geagea =

Geagea is a surname. Also spelt '"Jaajaa'". Notable people with the surname include:

- Ibrahim Geagea (1924–1985), Lebanese alpine skier
- Samir Geagea (born 1952), Lebanese leader and politician
- Sethrida Geagea (born 1967), Lebanese politician
