= Tyous Team of Commandos =

Christian Lebanese militia active during the Lebanese Civil War

Tyous Team of Commandos فريق التيوس من المغاوير
- Flag of the Tyous Team of Commandos
- Leader: Joseph Hanna (a.k.a. Al-Anid) Elie Hobeika
- Dates active: Until 1985
- Headquarters: Achrafieh (Beirut)
- Active regions: East Beirut, Mount Lebanon
- Ideology: Lebanese nationalism Ultranationalism; Anti-communism; Anti-Palestinianism; Anti-pan-Arabism
- Political position: Right-wing to far-right
- Size: 3500 fighters
- Part of: Lebanese Front; Lebanese Forces
- Wars: Lebanese Civil War

The Tyous Team of Commandos – TTC (Arabic: فريق التيوس من المغاوير| Fariq Tyous min' al-Maghawir) or simply Tyous for short ('Tyous' means 'Male Goat' in Arabic, also translated as the "Stubborn Ones"; "Les Têtus", "Les Obstinés" in French), was a small Christian militia which fought in the 1975–78 phase of the Lebanese Civil War.

== Origins ==
The Tyous (written in Arabic as التيوس pronounced Tyoos) were quietly formed at the early 1970s in Beirut by Joseph Hanna (nom de guerre Al Anid), a Christian Maronite rightwing activist who strongly opposed the 1969 Cairo Agreement and the presence of Palestine Liberation Organization (PLO) guerrilla factions in Lebanon. Prior to 1975 Al Anid cultivated close relations with other Christian rightist parties and organizations, which enabled his group to receive funds and military training, namely from the Kataeb Party and the secretive Al-Tanzim.

The original members of the TTC were predominantly Maronites but soon began to accept volunteers from the Syriac Christian community of Iraqi origin, who had migrated illegally to Lebanon in the 1960s to escape persecution and poverty in their home country. The Syriacs were drawn – and sworn allegiance – to the militias of the Christian-rightist camp by promises of integration and attaining full Lebanese citizenship.

The name 'Tyous' was reportedly given to the group by Bashir Gemayel, the commander of the KRF and future leader of the Lebanese Forces (LF).

== Structure and organization ==
The Tyous was organized into a 100 men-strong light infantry group roughly equivalent to an understrength infantry company, initially provided with small-arms purchased on the black market. Additional weapons and equipment (including all-terrain vehicles) were acquired after January 1976 from Lebanese Army stocks and Internal Security Forces (ISF) Police stations, which enabled the group to raise a motor force of some gun-trucks armed with heavy machine guns (HMGs), recoilless rifles and a few anti-aircraft autocannons. They also received covert military assistance from Israel via the Phalange and later the Lebanese Forces.

In the late 1970s the Tyous HQ was located at Ashrafieh, in the 'Museum Crossing' area and respective Green Line sector which they usually manned. Personally commanded by Al-Anid, the Tyous was technically answerable to the Phalange KRF War Council, but reported directly to Bashir Gemayel instead.

After Bachir Gemayel's assassination in September 1982 however, the TTC was re-organized with Al-Anid never being replaced. However, the Tyous' HQ was placed under the direct orders of Elie Hobeika, and remained so until himself was ousted from the LF command by Samir Geagea in January 1985.

== War activities and controversies ==
The TTC were notorious for their lack of discipline and restraint, who all too often brutally murdered any hapless non-Christian civilian that came into their hands. They crossed the green line at least once a week completing missions and causing trouble with the Leftists without direct orders from Bachir Gemayel; when asked to stop, they would not answer to their orders (Hence the "Tyous" or Stubborn ones").

Moreover, their combat reputation was tainted by their direct involvement in atrocities against other Christians. This fact was attested in July – August 1976, when the Phalangists, the Army of Free Lebanon and other Lebanese Front militias overrun after a long siege the Muslim-populated slum districts and adjacent Palestinian refugee camps located at East Beirut – Karantina, al-Maslakh and Tel al-Zaatar – the Tyous joined in the respective massacres and expulsion of the remaining Palestinian refugees and Muslims.

In June 1978, an attack by a combined force of some 10 Tyous' fighters and about 1,000 Phalangists led by Samir Geagea and Elie Hobeika led to the Ehden massacre; whereby their rival Tony Frangieh responsible for the murder of many Phalangists leaders in North Lebanon, was killed along with his family.

== History ==
=== The Tyous in the civil war 1975–78 ===
As members of the Lebanese Front since early 1976, the Tyous were committed to the defense of the Christian-held urban and sub-urban eastern districts of the Lebanese Capital from the leftist Lebanese National Movement (LNM) militias.

Engaged for the most part in static operations at Beirut's Green Line, the Tyous bore the brunt of the LNM-PLO alliance 'Spring offensive' held at March that year. Attached to Dany Chamoun's Tigers Militia, they successfully rebuffed enemy attempts to penetrate their positions along the Achrafieh sector.

Later in February 1978, the Tyous and the Tigers under the command of Bashir Gemayel drove out the Syrian Army from East Beirut during the siege that lasted for a hundred days in a war called the Hundred Days' War. Al-Anid was announced dead at this war, however it was a sniper bullet that cut his ear in half. It was his right-hand man who was killed on the last day of the war.

=== The Lebanese forces' era 1979–85 ===
Upon the creation of the Lebanese Forces' Command in 1977, the TTC was easily integrated into the ranks of the new LF militia and attained 'elite' status, displacing the old BG Company (Bachir Gemayel Company) of the KRF. Eventually, upon joining the Kataeb Party Al-Anid rose to the post of Commander in the 1st unit of the 'Special Forces' of the Lebanese Forces War Council. He hand picked the fighters to join his unit., and continued to lead the Tyous in some battles. He ordered seniors to use the Tyous' combat powers achieve their own objectives.

The TTC was also deeply involved in the highly controversial 'unification of the Christian rifle' operations launched in the late 1970s by Bashir Gemayel, who used the Tyous as an instrument to eliminate its rival Christian militias and leaders to absorb their forces into the LF, thus consolidating them into a powerbase for himself. In July 1980, the Tyous helped Bashir and his Phalange-dominated LF in unifying the Christian militias once and for all, by launching a swift attack against the fighters of NLP Tigers Militia in several locations, mainly in the Safra beach resort. Camille Chamoun then disbanded the Tigers and called for a truce, because the Tigers Militia and the Lebanese Forces were "brothers".

In October 1982, just weeks after Bashir Gemayel's death, Al-Anid signed his resignation letter and relieved himself of the command of the Special Forces team in the War Council making it possible for other seniors in the LF to take over command. The next time he was engaged in battle after leaving the LF was when Syrian, Amal Movement and Hobeika's LFEC troops were attacking the defenseless Achrafieh in 1986. With the help of Achrafieh residents and fighters and the Lebanese Army the attack against Achrafieh failed.

=== Decline and disbandment 1985–86 ===
After Hobeika's downfall in 1985 however, the Tyous' fortunes waned – the unit was disbanded and little trace remained of them since they had no leader, with exception of their old HQ in the Museum crossing area facing the National Museum, which still stands until today. Some unconfirmed reports suggest that former Tyous' members might have joined Hobeika at Zahlé, playing a role in the formation of its dissident Lebanese Forces – Executive Command (LFEC) militia the following year. In the post-war period, other former Tyous members later lent their support to Michel Aoun in 2005.

== See also ==
- Al-Tanzim
- Lebanese Civil War
- Lebanese Front
- Lebanese Forces
- Lebanese Forces – Executive Command
- List of weapons of the Lebanese Civil War
- Tigers Militia
- Kataeb Regulatory Forces
- Young Men (Lebanon)
