= Promise Party =

Promise Party حزب الوعد
- Leader: Joseph Hobeika
- Founder: Elie Hobeika
- Headquarters: Zahle
- Membership: 1500 (As of 2023)
- Colors: Black, Red, Green
- Slogan: "For You Lebanon"

The Promise Party, also known as the Waad Party (Arabic: حزب الوعد, romanized: Ḥizb al-Waʿad) is a Lebanese political party founded by former Lebanese Forces leader Elie Hobeika.

== Origins ==
It was formed in 1986 at the town of Zahlé in the Beqaa Valley, originally under the title National Secular Democratic Party – NSDP (Arabic: Hizb al-Watani al-A'almani al-Dimuqrati), later re-designated the 'Promise Party', and served as the political branch of the Lebanese Forces – Executive Command (LFEC) militia.

The party held several ministries during the consecutive governments from 1990 to 1998. The party also had several members of parliament from 1992 to 2000.

After the assassination of Hobeika in 2002, the party was led by his wife Gina Hobeika, but its popularity considerably decreased.

== See also ==
- Elie Hobeika
- Lebanese Forces
- Lebanese Civil War
- Young Men (Lebanon)
- Zahliote Group
