= Jean Obeid =

Lebanese politician (1939–2021)

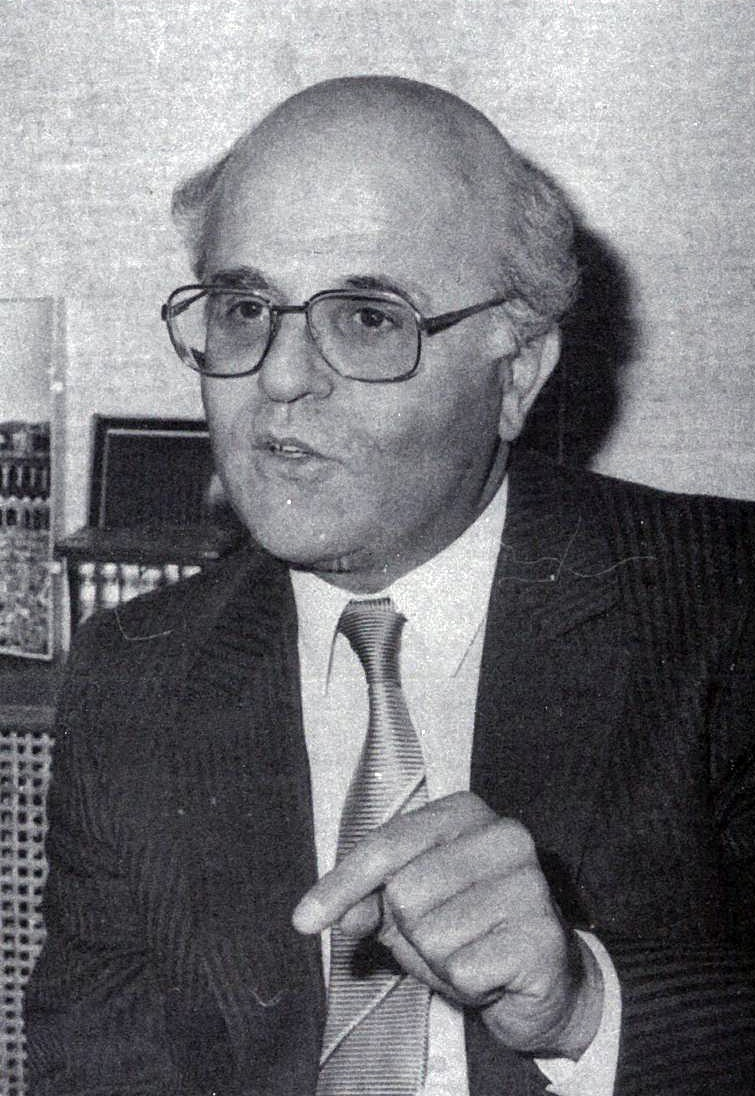
- Obeid in 1988

Minister of Foreign Affairs and Emigrants
- In office 17 April 2003 – 26 October 2004
- Prime Minister: Rafik Hariri
- Preceded by: Mahmoud Hammoud
- Succeeded by: Mahmoud Hammoud

Personal details
- Born: 8 May 1939 Alma, Lebanon, France
- Died: 8 February 2021 (aged 81) Beirut, Lebanon
- Spouse: Loubna Boustany
- Children: 5
- Education: Saint Joseph University

Jean Obeid (Arabic: جان عبيد; 8 May 1939 – 8 February 2021) was a Lebanese lawyer, journalist and politician, who served in different cabinet posts, the last of which was foreign minister of Lebanon from 2003 to 2004.

== Early life and education ==
Obeid hailed from a Maronite family. He was born in Alma, a village in the Zgharta district, on 8 May 1939.

Obeid obtained a degree in law from the Saint Joseph University in Beirut.

== Career ==
Obeid was a journalist by profession. He held several high-level positions in various newspapers and magazines. He worked for Lisan Al Hal in 1960 and for the Assayad magazine and Al Anwar daily from 1966.

Obeid was an advisor on Arab affairs to two former Lebanese Presidents, Elias Sarkis (1978-1982) and Amin Gemayel (1983-1987). Gemayel also appointed him special envoy to Syria. On 11 February 1987, Obeid met with Parliament Speaker Hussein Husseini and was kidnapped by nine gunmen in west Beirut. Obeid was freed unhurt after four days.

Obeid served as a member of the parliament, representing Chouf from 1991 to 1992 and Tripoli from 1992 to 2005. He served as minister of state in the cabinet led by Prime Minister Rafik Hariri between 1993 and 1995. Then he was the minister of national education, youth and sports from 1996 to 1998. He was appointed to the same post in 2000.

On 17 April 2003, Obeid was appointed foreign minister in a reshuffle to the last cabinet of Hariri, replacing Mahmoud Hammoud in the post. Obeid's tenure ended in 2004, and he was succeeded by Mahmoud Hammoud as foreign minister. In 2008, Obeid ran for the presidential elections and was considered to be possible consensus candidate. He was also a candidate for President of Lebanon and participated in the 2014 Lebanese presidential election.

In May 2018, Obeid returned to the Lebanese parliament by winning the Maronite seat for the constituency of Tripoli.

== Personal life and death ==
Obeid was married to Emile Boustany's daughter, Loubna, and had five children. He was also the maternal uncle of the economist Jihad Azour.

On the morning of 8 February 2021, the National News Agency (NNA) announced that Obeid had died due to complications from COVID-19 during the COVID-19 pandemic in Lebanon.

Political offices
Preceded by Mahmoud Hammoud	Minister of Foreign Affairs and Emigrants; 17 April 2003 – 26 October 2004	Succeeded by Mahmoud Hammoud
