= Henri Helou =

Lebanese politician (born 1953)

Henri Helou (Arabic: هنري الحلو; born 3 July 1953 in Beirut, Lebanon), is a Lebanese politician and a member of the Lebanese Parliament and a member of the Democratic Gathering Bloc.

== Early life and education ==
Helou is the son of Lebanese MP Pierre Helou. His maternal grandfather is the renowned Lebanese politician, Member of Parliament, writer and journalist Michel Chiha. Initially French educated, Helou received his higher education in the United States at Cornell University studying engineering and then moved to al-Khobar in Saudi Arabia for work. He later received his master's degree in civil engineering at University of London. He was chosen as the architect in charge of building the palace of the former Emir of Qatar in Cannes. He also lived for a few years in Montreal, Quebec, Canada.

== Politics ==
Helou ran for Lebanese parliament in 2003 following his father Pierre Helou's death who was a member of the Parliament. In a partial election to fill in the vacancy in the Christian Maronite seat in the Baabda-Aley electoral district, Henri Helou beat rival candidate and pro-Aounist candidate Hekmat Deeb. He also enrolled again in 2010 at the American University in Beirut for further studies.

=== Presidential candidacy ===
Helou was nominated by Walid Jumblatt and his Progressive Socialist Party (PSP) for the Lebanese presidential elections in 2014. In the first round, requiring two-thirds of the 128 Lebanese MPs (meaning 86 votes), on 23 April 2014, Lebanese Forces leader Samir Geagea received 48 votes, whereas Henri Helou received 16 votes and former president Amine Gemayel 1 vote, with 52 blank votes and seven void cancelled votes. As all the MPs left after the vote, there was no quorum to hold the second round, which needed only a simple majority of votes.

Candidate	Party	First round	
Candidate	Party	Votes	%
Samir Geagea	Lebanese Forces Party	48	37.50
Henri Helou	Progressive Socialist Party	16	12.50
Amine Gemayel	Kataeb Party	1	1.00
Invalid/blank votes		59	46.09
Total		124	96.9
Eligible voters		128	100

Helou's candidacy remained on the ballots for 45 unsuccessful rounds, but was withdrawn when it became obvious that General Michel Aoun would win and Jumblatt personally supported Aoun's candidacy and pledged that a big majority of his bloc's MPs would also vote for Aoun instead of their own Progressive Socialist Party-supported candidate Helou.

Helou is married with Marianne Matrasse and has three children.
