= 2014–2016 Lebanese presidential election =

← 2008	23 April 2014 – 31 October 2016	2022–25 →
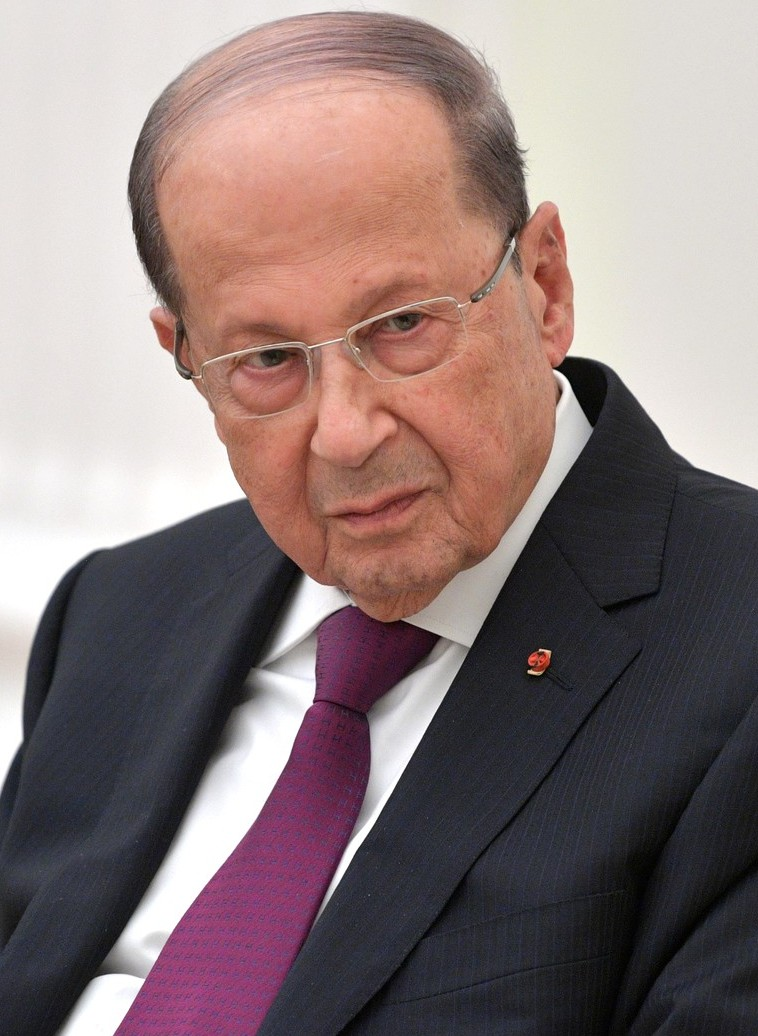

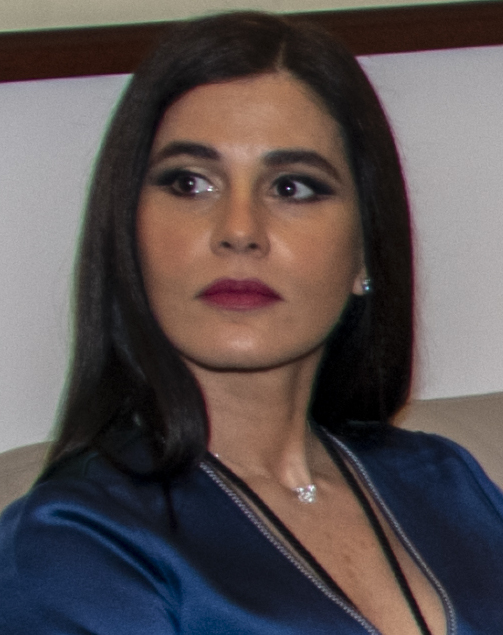
Nominee	Michel Aoun	Sethrida Geagea
Party	Free Patriotic Movement	Lebanese Forces
Electoral vote	83	1
Percentage	65.35%	0.78%
President before election
Tammam Salam (acting)
Future Movement
Elected President
Michel Aoun
Free Patriotic Movement

An indirect presidential election took place in Lebanon from 23 April 2014 until 31 October 2016. No candidate reached a two-thirds majority vote in the first round, and subsequent rounds failed to gain a quorum. Finally, in the second round of the forty-sixth session held on 31 October 2016, Michel Aoun, a member of parliament and formerly a disputed prime minister and acting president in a rival government near the end of the Lebanese Civil War, was elected with 83 votes by parliament. He took office the same day as the 13th President of Lebanon since independence in 1943.

== Background ==
Prior to the formation of the Salam government, the main consideration was carrying out the presidential election, which would precede the parliamentary election and a new electoral law. This follows an impasse between the March 14 Alliance and the March 8 Alliance. The Future Movement's former prime minister and parliamentary leader Fouad Siniora had started the process of discussion for the election prior to the government's formation. In regards to the political instability, Speaker Nabih Berri said: "In order to assure [March 14 groups] that our intentions are good, we do not mind holding the presidential election from now. Subsequently, there will no problem over the formation of a [new] government".

In accordance with the consociational power sharing agreement, the Taif Accord, the president of the country must be from the Maronite community, currently independent Michel Suleiman; while the prime minister is Sunni, currently independent Tammam Salam, and the parliamentary speaker is Shia, currently 8 March and Amal movement's Nabih Berri. In addition, the deputy speaker of parliament and the deputy prime minister in Lebanon must be Greek Orthodox.

== Candidates ==
Possible candidates included Michel Aoun, Suleiman Frangieh, Jr., Samir Geagea, Jean Obeid, Riad Salameh, Jean Kahwaji, Boutros Harb, Robert Ghanem, Henri Helou, and Ziad Baroud. Maronite Patriarch Beshara Rai could be influential in the decision. Nadine Moussa was also said to be a possible candidate, making her the first woman for the role. Jumblatt also called for the return of Saad Hariri, who was in self-imposed exile, in order to "head an all-embracing cabinet to avert further tension and crises." Geagea added that he would remain in the race "until the end." He also noted that it was in the interests of the country to have a strong state and strong leader.

== Process ==
A parliamentary committee formed by Berri was due to give him their results of their discussions. This includes points such as the intention of MPs from both 8 and 14 March to attend the parliamentary session to elect a new president and that there was no desire from any party for a constitutional amendment but that an election should be held on time. It also highlighted Rai's role in hailing Berri’s efforts to make a conducive atmosphere for the election.

== Results ==
On 25 May 2014, Suleiman's term ended without a successor, leading to a political vacuum. In the interim, Prime Minister Tamaam Salam's government assumed presidential duties.

=== First session ===
With a first round victory requiring two-thirds of MPs, or 86 votes, on 23 April Samir Geagea received 48 votes, Henri Helou 16 votes and Amine Gemayel 1 vote, with 52 votes blank and seven void. The void votes were for candidates who were no longer alive. As all the MPs left after the vote, there was no quorum to hold the second round, which needed only an absolute majority of votes.

In reaction, the Carnegie Middle East Center's Mario Abou Zeid said:,"Things could develop fairly quickly [today] to either bring certain names to the fore or distance certain names from running, and that needs to be closely watched. Lebanese resistance group Hezbollah is a key player in deciding who gets elected as president. It's not in their best interest at all to have a kind of president that might go against... their intervention in the Syrian conflict." Habib Malik, associate professor of history at Lebanese American University, added: "Things could develop fairly quickly [today] to either bring certain names to the fore or distance certain names from running, and that needs to be closely watched. Most likely, in traditional Lebanese fashion, a non-descript figure will emerge and will be touted as a reconciliatory, unifying figure." He suggested former MP and foreign minister Jean Obeid, who was said to be close to both Saudi Arabia and Syria.

=== Later sessions ===
Jumblatt suggested that there may not be a quorum for the expected second round vote. It was scheduled for 30 April, with a third round for 15 May and a fourth round for 22 May. A lack of quorum, however, stopped the elections.

Following Hezbollah and FPM's boycott of the four previous sessions to choose a president, the FPM said that it would not attend the fifth session at the end of May unless an agreement over a consensus candidate is made. The round was then aborted. The sixth attempt, on 9 June, also failed for a lack of a quorum after FPM and Hezbollah maintained their boycott. The session was attended by a new low of 64 MPs, notably PSP leader Walid Jumblatt missed this session, which was his first during the process. The Daily Star suggested that, instead, the main interest on the day was a salary increase for MPs. The eighth round similarly failed to achieve a quorum, and a ninth round was scheduled for 23 July. Similarly, the ninth round failed to attain a quorum while Lebanese Forces MP Strida Geagea said she held rival Christian MPs responsible for the failure to elect a president Berri's spokesman, Mohammad Ballout, read out a statement saying that the election was canceled "over lack of quorum." Berri set 2 September as the date for the next vote. Thirty minutes after the session began there were only 57 MPs present while Berri and Salaam were absent. Hezbollah MP Ali Fayyad reiterated that "the political stance on the presidential election has not changed. What is required is an agreement among the political parties on a conciliatory candidate for the presidency." Once again, the 11th round failed or a lack of quorum with only 50 of 86 necessary MPs present. Berri postponed the election to 9 October over a lack of quorum. The 13th round failed as well for lack of quorum, after only about 58 of the minimum 86 MPs were present. Berri set the 14th round for 29 October. The 15th round also failed for lack of quorum with Berri setting 10 December for the next round. The 27th round failed on 12 August 2015, with the next round set for 2 September. The 34th round failed on 16 December 2015, with the next round set for 7 January. The 35th round failed on 7 January 2016, with the next round set for 8 February. The 36th round failed on 8 February 2016, with the next round set for 2 March. The 37th round failed on 2 March 2016, with the next round set for 23 March. The 38th round failed on 23 March 2016, with the next round set for 18 April. The 39th round failed on 18 April 2016, with the next round set for 10 May. The 44th round failed on 7 September 2016, with the next round set for 28 September.

=== Forty-sixth session ===
After obtaining enough voting pledges for Michel Aoun, Speaker Berri announced that an elective sitting would be held on 31 October 2016. Widespread acclamation ensued in the country, as the sitting would mark the end of the presidential vacuum.

All 127 MPs attended the sitting. The session started on 12 AM. The first round failed by a very narrow margin of 2 votes, as a two-thirds majority, 86 votes, would have been required for a win. There were 84 votes cast for Michel Aoun, one vote for MP Gilberte Zwein, and one invalid vote for pop star Myriam Klink.

Subsequent rounds required an absolute majority, 64 votes, for a win. The second round was rejected immediately because there were 128 votes in the urn, but only 127 MPs.

The third round was held at around 1 PM and failed similarly to the second round after MP Sami Gemayel contested Berri's decision to count the votes without requiring the total number to be valid.

The voting in the fourth round was done by placing the urn under surveillance by Antoine Zahra and Marwan Hamadeh to prevent double voting. This resulted in the successful election of MP Michel Aoun after receiving 83 votes. MP Sethrida Tawk and Zorba the Greek received one vote each.

Other satirical votes included the statements "Cedar Revolution at your service" and "Legitimate or illegitimate session?"

=== Result ===
First round of first session			2nd to 44th sessions*		
Candidate	Votes	%	Candidate	Votes	%
Samir Geagea	48	73.85			
Henri Helou	16	24.61			
Amine Gemayel	1	1.54			
Valid votes	65	52.42			
Blank votes	52	41.93			
Invalid votes	7	5.65			
Total	124	100			
Eligible voters/turnout	128	96.88		128	

First round of 45th session			Cancelled round**		Cancelled round**		Second round of 46th session		
Candidate	Votes	%	Cancelled round**		Cancelled round**		Candidate	Votes	%
Michel Aoun	84	98.82					Michel Aoun	83	98.81
Gilberte Zouein	1	1.18					Sethrida Tawk	1	1.19
Valid votes	85	66.93					Valid votes	84	66.14
Blank votes	36	28.35					Blank votes	36	28.35
Invalid votes	6	4.72					Invalid votes	7	5.51
Total	127	100	128	100	128	100	Total	127	100
Eligible voters/turnout	127	100	127	100.78	127	100.78	Eligible voters/turnout	127	100

*The interim sessions failed to achieve a quorum on their first round.

**The first and second attempt at the second round were cancelled because there were more votes than present MPs.

== Domestic developments ==
Free Patriotic Movement's MP Michel Aoun said that he would insist on holding the parliamentary election on schedule if Future Movement's Saad Hariri did not support his candidacy for the presidency or if a new president will not be elected before September. Geagea challenged Aoun to run against him or move to a "plan B" that would enable a consensual candidate that is not considered partisan as being from either of the two political alliances, which, in addition to the two, are Phalange's Amine Gemayel and Marada Movement's Suleiman Frangieh.

After the sixth round of voting failed, Lebanese Democratic Party leader Talal Arslan suggested that the president should be directly elected by the people. In doing so, he said: "The presidential crisis is a major insult to the Lebanese nation. [sic] The only way to save the nation and restore respect to the presidency is by holding the election directly by the people." Lebanese Forces MP Antoine Zahra added that Geagea remained the party's candidate and asked: "Do those who are obstructing the session and violating the constitution know that their right to [be] absent from the sessions drops in light of [a] presidential void?" At the same time, Geagea added: "The Lebanese people should address the lawmakers that they elected who are obstructing quorum and question the motives behind their action." Outgoing President Michel Suleiman added: "It is not right to accuse the foreign community of obstructing the presidential election while we are setting preconditions and counter-conditions for the features of the new president. Let us keep the foreign community away from the presidential election and take part in the parliamentary session to vote for a new president."

Lebanon's Grand Mufti Sheikh Mohammed Rashid Qabbani said on 27 June that the "[Presidential void] opens the door for a looseness in security, and invites those who [are willing to] do Lebanon harm. [It] is an abnormal situation that we should attempt to terminate it immediately."

In the first week of July and in response to Aoun's call for direct popular presidential elections, as well as an electoral draft law to allow each sect to choose its own representatives, Geagea told al-Joumhouria: "Aoun hasn’t proposed a serious initiative. He made a media stir to pressure the Lebanese parties into electing him a president. There is a need for amendments to carry out the presidential polls properly but these changes can be proposed only after the elections." Aoun's proposal would entail Christians voting in a first round and the top two candidates then running in a national election. Geagea's further response included: "The goal of putting forward a constitutional amendment is to divert attention from the presidential election."

Amidst the ninth round, Zahra called on MPs to elect a new president when Speaker Nabih Berri called for a session to express solidarity with Gaza during Operation Protective Edge and Christians in Mosul during 2014 Northern Iraq offensive. Zahra said "If two thirds of MPs were present to attend tomorrow’s session, then they should be able elect a new president. Refraining from doing so would be a violation of the constitution and an attempt to make people get used to not having a president."

Future Movement leader Saad Hariri's return from self-imposed exile in Saudi Arabia in August was hailed by some MPs as the impetus needed to break the stalemate. 14 March MP Jean Ogasapian said Hariri "is expected to make tangible progress in the presidential election." However, Geagea praised Hariri's return as "positive," but that his presence in Lebanon "will not change anything in terms of the presidential election because it’s not March 14 that is disrupting the election; it’s the other [political] team." Hariri reiterated: "We can’t accept the continuity of the presidential void. No parliamentary elections will take place before we hold presidential elections." He further noted that in the event of a continued stalemate, he would support the extension of the parliamentary mandate in order to avoid a void in state institutions. Just before he had met Jumblatt, who said Hariri's "presence in Lebanon is an essential factor in solving the country’s grave problems. The Arab world is threatened and there is general chaos but in the presence of Saad Hariri and the Kingdom of Saudi Arabia, there is an umbrella protecting Lebanon...it isn’t enough to acknowledge the protective umbrella, we, as concerned parties, should also reinforce and support stabilizing the state." He maintained his support for Helou because he was "a model for moderation. The moment we let go of Helou (as a candidate), we lose the line of centrism and moderation." He further condemned the paralysis of all state institutions and warned of a replication of the Iraqi crisis in the country.

Prior to the 10th round, Amine Gemayel said the country needs a president who would inspire confidence across all factions and would be able to defend the country’s interest internationally. He further noted that politicians and spiritual leaders needed to help end the stalemate. Berri also said he was in talks with Jumblatt to break the deadlock and added that "with every day that passes [without a solution], the presidential crisis becomes more complicated." After the 11th round, Bechara Boutros al-Rahi said: "Depriving us from a president is a stab in the core of our dignity and [a betrayal to] the values of Lebanon. We suffer from a lot of corruption in the administration, including bribery, embezzlement and waste of public resources."

After the 12th round, Berri said: "I am afraid that resolving this obstacle currently requires external intervention unfortunately." Lebanese Forces MP George Adwan said parliamentary action was required to hold the upcoming parliamentary election. "Do the people know that if we do not modify two articles in the electoral law, the appeals against the election would automatically become legitimate and we will not have elections?" He also rejected accusations that he was advocating an extension of parliament's term. The PSP spokesman Rami Rayyes announced:

The Democratic Gathering bloc headed by Jumblatt holds on to its presidential candidate Henry Helou. We would save more time when the concerned parties are convinced that compromise is the only option. But unfortunately this doesn’t happen, making prospects dim for [early] presidential elections.

On the eve of the 13th round, Berri said he supported Hariri's stance that a parliamentary election needs to be preceded by the presidential election. After the 13th failure, Geagea accused Hezbollah and FPM of aborting successive attempts alleging: "More than three months have passed without a president, impacting our sovereignty, economy and political situation and placing the whole country in limbo." Berri also suggested that the Syrian civil war spillover in Lebanon could destabilise the country under a vacuum. "If the Lebanese remain united, then they (terrorists) will not be able to achieve much." Berri reiterated that the presidential outcome must be finalised before a parliamentary election. Rai warned from Canberra where he was meeting with Eastern church leaders, that Lebanon should not get used to the absence of a Christian president. Lebanese Kataeb MP Elie Marouni added that the country was being destroyed in the vacuum; it comes a few months after he said Hariri's plan for a parliamentary electoral law could be in place shortly after a new president was chosen and that in regards to the candidates the country's needed Gemayel's "wisdom."

The 15th round again fail to achieve a result for lack of a quorum after only 54 of 128 MPs were present. Berri set a new date for 19 November. As a result, parliament was due to vote the following week on extending its mandate by two years and seven months with a bill proposed by MP Nicolas Fattoush. Parties from both alliances have spoken out against the motion, including FPM, Kataeb and Lebanese Forces. Though Berri was initially opposed to motion, he changed his mind after the Future Movement said it would boycott a parliamentary election scheduled for 16 November in the absence of a president. This follows an extension of the parliamentary mandate by 17 months last year. Rai also reacted to the failure in saying it was time to use the "stick" and that "both political factions are waiting to see who is victorious: Sunnis or Shiites, Iran or Saudi Arabia, the regime in Syria or the opposition." Geagea, for his part, added that the failure was tantamount to "overthrowing the Lebanese political system" and would have dire consequences for the country, in particular the Christians. He also called for putting pressure on Hezbollah and Aoun to reach a deal saying that the latter's ambitions had left the country with a vacuum. He further criticised the proposed extension as the "greatest current fraud operation." Gemayel also met Aoun at his residence in Rabieh to discuss the deadlock, describing it as "excellent. If we don’t meet in these circumstances, when will we meet? We tried to convince Aoun to go down with us to a parliamentary session to elect a president, but he was not convinced. Maybe next time." Marada's Sleiman Frangieh said: "The president will remain a Maronite, so why is the vacancy being taken negatively. There is a Christian agreement over rejecting a weak president. Christians today prefer a void over a weak president and this is a positive thing." He also praised Hariri for his moderate stand in regard to the north Lebanon clashes in relation to the Syrian civil war. Amidst suggestions to have a tri-partite power-sharing formula (as in Bosnia - tri-partite: Maronite, Shia, Sunni), Rai, who was visiting Australia, also added "MPs did not elect a president, because they are waiting for a signal from certain states. A dangerous thing is happening now, which I did not believe before could happen, which is that they [certain MPs] want a conference to reconsider Lebanon as an entity and they want a tripartite power-sharing formula. I say that we will not accept a tripartite power-sharing formula or any conference [to reconsider the Lebanese political system]."

== International reaction ==
Prior to the sixth round, the United Nations Security Council issued a statement that read: "The Council urges the Parliament to uphold Lebanon’s longstanding democratic tradition and to work to ensure that presidential elections take place as soon as possible and without external interference." It follows Secretary-General Ban Ki-moon's comments four days earlier expressing regret over a failure to elect a new president and calling for a new one "without delay." Similarly, the International Support Group for Lebanon (ISGL) called for strong work amongst national leaders to quickly elect a new president, while also saying the Tammam Salam government needed to remain functional. U.N. Special Coordinator for Lebanon Derek Plumbly said: "We underline again that there is no international impediment to [holding the presidential election]. On the contrary, while the process must remain a purely Lebanese one, Lebanon’s friends within the international community stand ready to offer Lebanon every possible encouragement and support at this time."

On a visit surprise to Beirut in early June, U.S. Secretary of State John Kerry called for the speedy election of a president. A delegation from the Holy See also visited the country in the end of June to meet with Maronite Patriarch Bechara Boutros al-Rahi. They were scheduled to discuss the election amid rumours that the latter was planning a trip to other countries to try and resolve the impasse over the election.

After the failure of the 11th round, Plumbly said he "stress[es] the importance of preserving Lebanon’s values of democracy, moderation and pluralism, and the institutions of the state which enshrine them" and he has solidarity with the institutions of the state that he claimed were "held hostage by violent extremist groups." The year-old ISGL was also focusing on the election.

On the sidelines of the opening of the sixty-ninth session of the United Nations General Assembly, the ISGL issued a statement that read there is still an international umbrella protecting Lebanon. In regards to the election, an unnamed diplomatic source said the solution lay with Lebanese officials. International players would limit their work to getting influential countries to pressure their allies to facilitate electing a president but that the deadlock was less complicated than the Syrian or regional conflicts. Saudi Arabia said a US$3 billion grant for arms, signed along with France, was pending approval after the election of a new president to get assurances Hezbollah would not benefit.

French Ambassador Patrice Paoli said that a new president was needed who had strong ties with the variety of political parties and that his country maintained an open dialogue with all groups, including the Western-banned Hezbollah. "Officials should get together to discuss the presidential paralysis and choose a person for the post, and the strong president is the one who has strong relationships with all parties." Former colonial power France, with the backing of the U.S., was said to be in talks with Iran over resolving the deadlock.
