= Young Men (Lebanon) =

Christian Lebanese Militia

Young Men الشباب
- Leaders: Elie Hobeika, Maroun Machahalani, Georges Melko, Michel Zouen
- Dates active: 1975–1986
- Headquarters: Karantina, Ashrafieh (Beirut)
- Active regions: East Beirut, Southern Lebanon, Beqaa Valley
- Size: 100 fighters
- Part of: Kataeb Regulatory Forces; Lebanese Forces
- Wars: Lebanese Civil War

The Young Men (Arabic: الشباب, romanized: Chabeb) were a small Lebanese Christian militia linked to the Lebanese Forces (LF), which fought in the Lebanese Civil War between 1978 and 1986.

== Origins ==
During the early 1975-77 phase of the Lebanese Civil War, the armed militants of the Kataeb Regulatory Forces (KRF) and later the Lebanese Forces (LF) operated with little discipline or restraint in a situation of escalating violence. As the war progressed, the Christian military leadership began to impose a higher degree of discipline on their militiamen and as a result, some of the early fighters found themselves being expelled from both the KRF and LF for insubordination, looting, and other crimes.

Elie Hobeika, the head of the newly founded Lebanese Forces' intelligence service, the Security Agency – LFSA (Arabic: جهاز الأمن | Jihaz al-Aman), claimed that some of these men had fought well and should be used, even if they were not suitable for the ordinary strict environment of military service. In 1978-79, Hobeika began to recruit these same militiamen and formed them into a new unit, known officially as the 'Special Force' – SF (Arabic: القوة الخاصة | Quwwat Al-Khasa), intended to be used on clandestine "special operations" under his own command. Separated from the LF's formal military structure, the new formation used different official titles over time according to Hobeika's changing role, such as the names of their commanders.

Initially sent to the Israeli-controlled border enclave in southern Lebanon to receive additional two weeks' training by the Israel Defense Forces (IDF), they were pulled out a few months later by the Israelis, who accused them of indiscipline (e.g. shooting local farm animals to relieve boredom). The Israelis cut all official ties with the militia soon after their return to east Beirut, but remained in close contact with Hobeika.

== Structure and organization ==
Placed under the strict control of the LF intelligence services, the Young Men/SF was little more than a criminal street gang whose members tended to have disadvantaged socio-economic backgrounds, troubled social backgrounds, and limited education. The group did not use a traditional military structure. Based in East Beirut, they aligned some 100 militiamen, initially loosely organized into three separated groups of thirty or so men each – the main group, led by Maroun Machahalani was allocated on an old school building 100 meters away from the LF headquarters (HQ) in Karantina; the second group, led by Georges Melko was deployed in Ashrafieh not far from the Hôtel-Dieu de France Hospital and lastly, the third group, led by Michel Zouen was based near Beirut's old central railway station.

== List of Young Men commanders ==
- Elie Hobeika
- Georges Melko
- Maroun Machahalani
- Michel Zouen

== Weapons and equipment ==
The Young Men/SF were equipped as a light infantry force, with uniforms, equipment and small-arms being provided by the LF and the Israelis. In addition, they also fielded a small number of technicals (Willys M38A1 MD jeeps, Land-Rover series II-III and Toyota Land Cruiser (J42) pickups) armed mostly with heavy machine guns (HMGs) and a few recoilless rifles and anti-aircraft autocannons.

== Controversy ==
Although they had combat experience, the Young men/SF were held in contempt by most Lebanese Forces' personnel, who disparagingly called them "the Apaches" or "the Indians" on account of their wild violent behaviour, exacerbated by the consumption of cocaine and other drugs. The group was also implicated in a wide range of violent crimes in the early 1980s, including the killing of many abductees and the September 1982 Sabra and Shatila massacre alongside LF and South Lebanon Army (SLA) units backed by the Israeli Defense Forces.

== Disbandment ==
During the Geagea-Hobeika conflict in January 1986, the Young Men/SF fought alongside other LF fighters loyal to Elie Hobeika for the control of east Beirut, clashing not only with their colleagues of the LF led by Samir Geagea but also with the Lebanese Army's 9th Infantry Brigade in the Hazmiyeh sector of the Green Line. After Hobeika and his LF supporters were defeated and ejected from east Beirut by Geagea's LF faction, the Young Men/SF went to provide the founding cadre of the notorious Lebanese Forces – Executive Command (LFEC) splinter faction, created that same year at Zahlé, Beqaa Valley, under the protection of the Syrian Army.

== See also ==
- Elie Hobeika
- Kataeb Regulatory Forces
- January 1986 Lebanese Forces coup
- Lebanese Civil War
- Lebanese Forces (militia)
- Lebanese Forces – Executive Command
- List of weapons of the Lebanese Civil War
- Sabra and Shatila massacre
- Tyous Team of Commandos
- Zahliote Group
- 9th Infantry Brigade (Lebanon)
