= Dahr al-Wahsh massacre =

Massacre Committed by the Syrian Army in Lebanon

- Part of the Lebanese Civil War and the War of Liberation
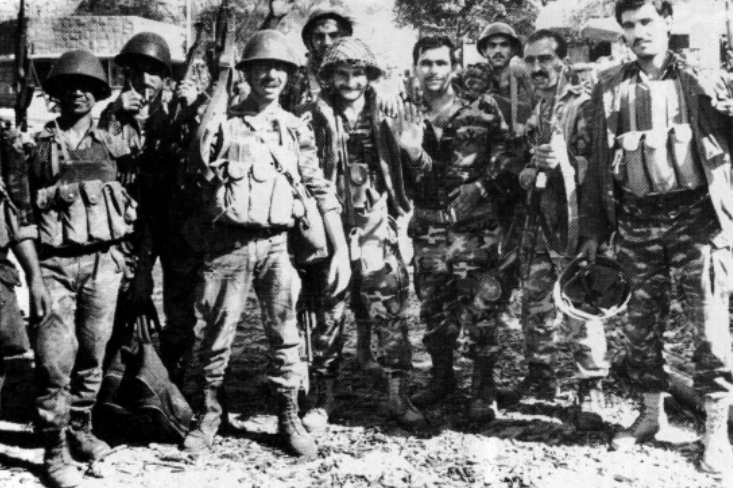
- Syrian soldiers at the presidential palace in Lebanon, 1990
- Location: Dahr al-Wahsh
- Date: 13 October 1990
- Target: Lebanese Army Prisoners of war
- Attack type: mass shooting
- Weapon: Automatic rifles
- Deaths: 240
- Perpetrators: Syrian Army; Lebanese Forces – Executive Command

Dahr al-Wahsh massacre (Arabic: مجزرة ضهر الوحش), also known as the October 13 massacre, occurred in the Lebanese village of Dahr al-Wahsh during the final stage of the Lebanese Civil War, in 13 October 1990, when the Syrian forces and their Christian militia allies (headed by Elie Hobeika) executed as many as 240 prisoners of war and army members of General Michel Aoun, the then de facto leader of Lebanon, who had declared a War of Liberation against Syrian forces occupying Lebanon, which led to intense confrontations.

The area where Dahr al-Wahsh is located was a front line during the battles between the Syrian forces and Christian militias loyal to Aoun, particularly the Lebanese Army under his command at the time.
