= Maarab Agreement =

The Maarab Agreement (or the 2016 Maarab Understanding, Arabic: تفاهم معراب) is a highly secretive document signed between the leader of the Free Patriotic Movement Gebran Bassil, and the leader of the Lebanese Forces Samir Geagea at the latter's headquarters in Maarab, Lebanon on January 18, 2016, which requires Geagea, who had withdrawn from the presidential race, to endorse Michel Aoun's candidacy for the 2016 presidential elections, years after a long dispute that goes back to the Lebanese Civil War. The agreement paved the way for the election of Michel Aoun as president in October that year.

The agreement also tackled the parliamentary elections, the distribution of the ministerial seats between the two parties and the distribution of the first class jobs equitably.

On October 31, 2016, Aoun was elected President of the Republic after two years of vacancy, but relations between the two parties soon became strained, especially after copies of the agreement were leaked by the Lebanese Broadcasting Corporation (LBC) television.

In 2019, Geagea called on Aoun to intervene to save the agreement, that have brought the two leaders together after decades of adversarial relations.

== See also ==
- Memorandum of understanding between the Free Patriotic Movement and Hezbollah
