= January 1986 Lebanese Forces coup =

Coup attempts in Lebanon

- Part of the Lebanese Civil War
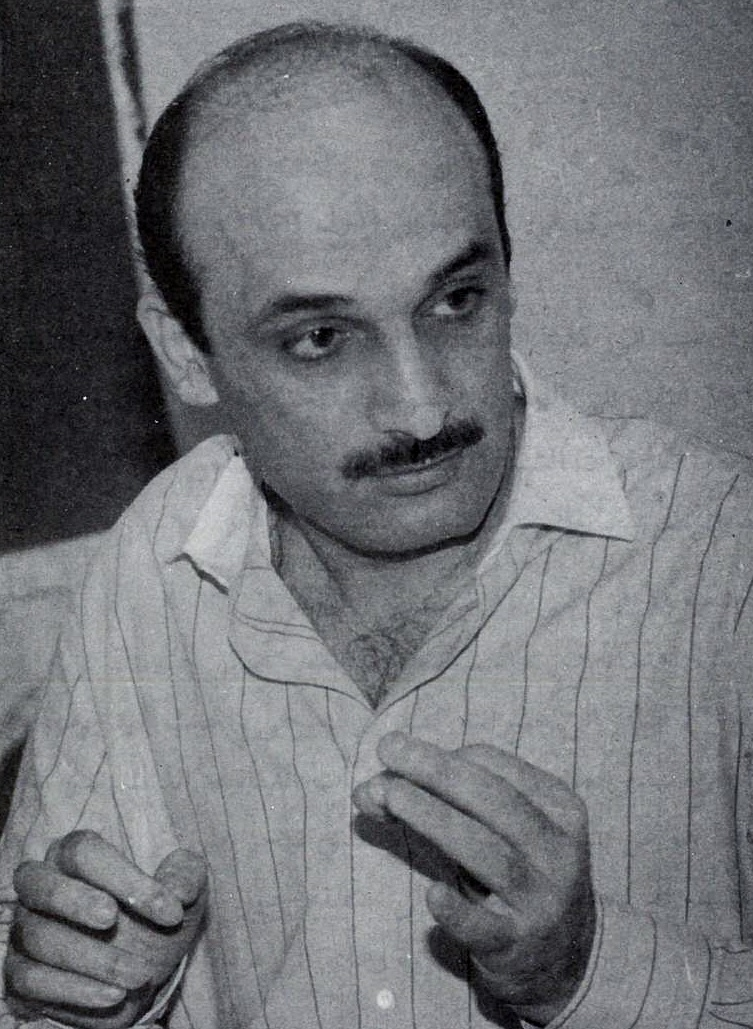
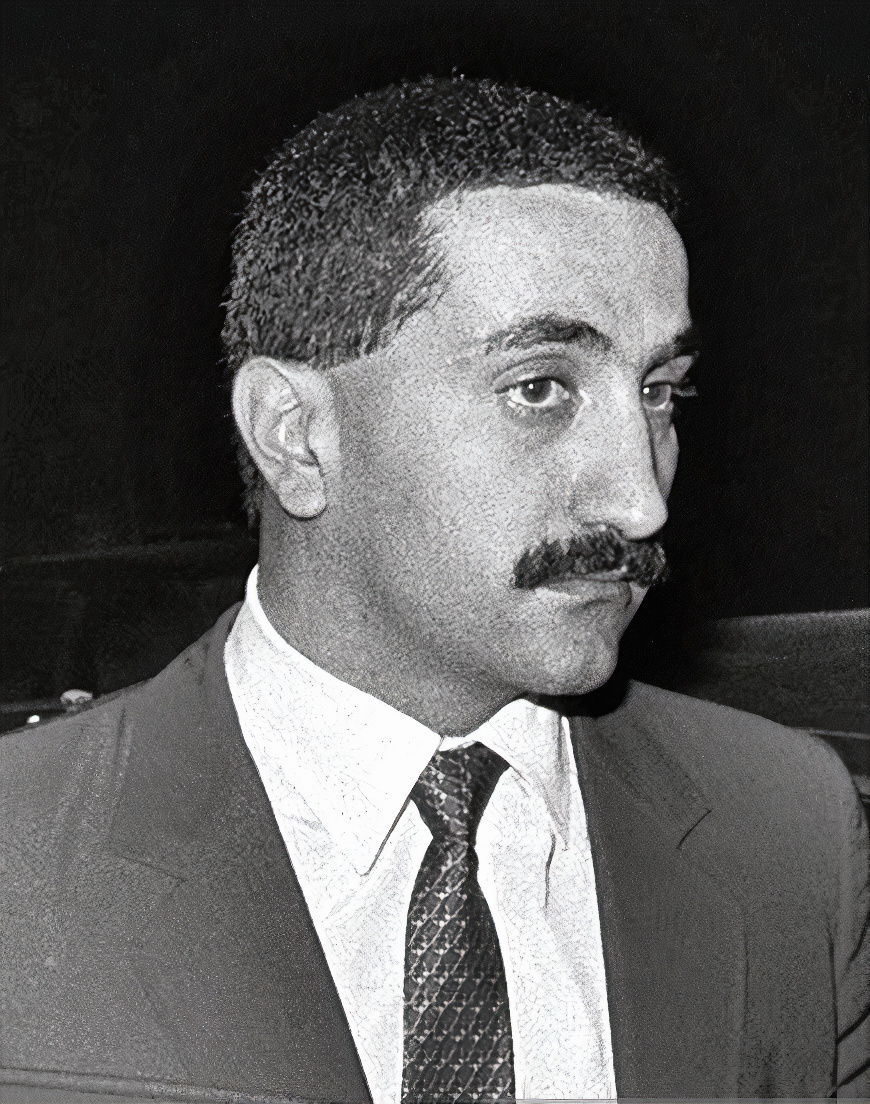
- Samir Geagea (left) and Elie Hobeika (right)
Date	January 1986
Location	Beirut and Metn
Result	Pro-Geagea/Kataeb victory: Tripartite Accord rejected; Geagea becomes leader of the Lebanese Forces; Hobeika flees to Zahle and forms the Lebanese Forces - Executive Command

Belligerents
Pro-Geagea faction Supported by: Kataeb Party; Lebanese Army units loyal to the President; Ba'athist Iraq	Pro-Hobeika faction: al-Quwwat al-Khassa; Supported by: Syria

Commanders and leaders
Samir Geagea; Karim Pakradouni; Amine Gemayel	Elie Hobeika

On January 15, 1986, forces loyal to Lebanese president Amine Gemayel and Samir Geagea, intelligence chief of the Lebanese Forces (LF), ousted Elie Hobeika from his position as leader of the LF and replaced him with Geagea. The coup came in response to Hobeika's signing of the Syrian-sponsored Tripartite Accord that aimed to put an end to the Lebanese Civil War.

== Background ==
The tussle between Samir Geagea and Elie Hobeika for control over the Lebanese Forces (LF) had started as early as March 1985. That same month, Samir Geagea gained control over the LF after defeating the last leader of the Phalangist militia, Fouad Abou Nader. In May of that same year, however, Elie Hobeika was appointed to lead that unit. In December 1985, Hobeika signed in the name of the LF an agreement with the Syrian government, the Druze Progressive Socialist Party (PSP) led by Walid Jumblatt, and the Shia Muslim Amal Movement headed by Nabih Berri, which became known as the Tripartite Accord. One of the cornerstones of the agreement was the disbandment of Lebanese militia forces. It also provided for initiating political changes that would end Christian dominance of the Lebanese parliament and army.

There was a dispute over whether to retain links with Israel and how to react to Syrian-sponsored negotiations to end the fighting. Hobeika broke LF links with Israel and supported the negotiations between the LF, the Lebanese government, Syria, and Druze leaders such as Walid Jumblatt. Geagea opposed the negotiations which he claimed would make unacceptable concessions to Syria and weaken the Lebanese Christian community's political power.

In October 1985, with negotiations in progress, skirmishes took place between Geagea's supporters and Hobeika's supporters, where Hobeika's supporters tried to bribe Geagea's supporter's to betray Geagea. In December 1985, a peace agreement, the Tripartite Accord, was reached. It was signed by Hobeika for the LF, but the LF Command Council was split, with only half agreeing with the deal. In addition, the agreement was criticized by the former President of Lebanon Camille Chamoun and leader of the predominately Christian Maronite National Liberal Party (NLP), and by some Maronite Church leaders because they felt that this agreement was one-sided, favoring the Muslim communities in Lebanon.

== The coup ==
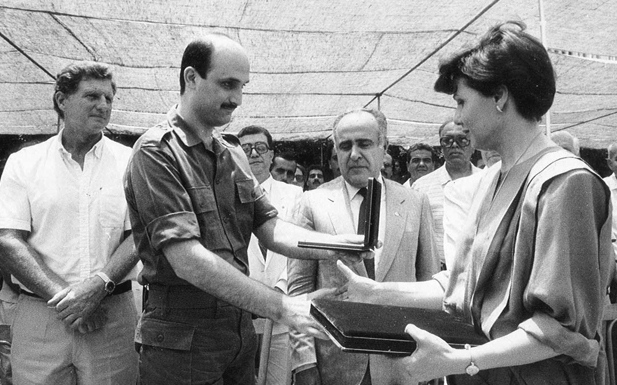
LF Supreme Commander Samir Geagea (center) with Dany Chamoun of the NLP (left) and Leila Hawi (right), east Beirut, late 1980s.

Samir Geagea and President Amine Gemayel decided not to accept the agreement. On 8 January 1986, with the backing of the 9th Brigade of the Lebanese Army, then under the command of Chief of Staff Michel Aoun, the LF faction of Geagea attacked that of Hobeika in East Beirut. In response, on 13 January 1986, the LF faction of Hobeika attacked the positions held by the Kataeb Party militia loyal to the President Amine Gemayel.

The support of the Kataeb to the pro-Geagea LF faction during the conflict proved decisive in the defeat of Hobeika and resulted in his ousting from the command of the LF and the taking over by Geagea. Hobeika fled in a helicopter from East Beirut and made his way to the town of Zahle in the Syrian-controlled Beqaa Valley, where he rallied his remaining supporters to form the dissident Lebanese Forces – Executive Command (LFEC) militia sponsored by Syria. Later, Geagea attacked the Kataeb militia that supported him and started a consolidation of power campaign, which resulted in crippling the Kataeb.

== See also ==
- Amal Movement
- Lebanese Armed Forces
- Lebanese Civil War
- Lebanese Forces
- Lebanese Forces – Executive Command
- Mountain War (Lebanon)
- Weapons of the Lebanese Civil War
- Young Men (Lebanon)
- 9th Infantry Brigade (Lebanon)
