= Mahmoud Hammoud (politician) =

Lebanese politician and diplomat (born 1935)

Minister of Foreign Affairs and Emigrants
- In office 26 October 2004 – March 2005
- Prime Minister: Omar Karami
- Preceded by: Jean Obeid
- Succeeded by: Fawzi Salloukh
- In office 23 October 2000 – April 2003
- Prime Minister: Rafic Hariri
- Preceded by: Selim al-Hoss
- Succeeded by: Jean Obeid

Personal details
- Born: 1935 Kafarkila, Lebanon
- Died: 8 May 2018 (aged 82–83)
- Party: Independent

Mahmoud Hammoud (1935 – 8 May 2018) was a Lebanese politician and diplomat.

Hammoud was a Shia Muslim.

He served as ambassador to the United Arab Emirates (1978–1983), West Germany (1983–1985), the Soviet Union and Finland (1986–1990), and the United Kingdom (1990–1999), where he was doyen of the diplomatic corps.

In October 2000, Hammoud became Foreign Minister for the first time. He served in that position until April 2003, when he became Defense Minister in a cabinet reshuffle. When the government of Omar Karami took office in October 2004, he was reappointed foreign minister. Karami and his cabinet resigned in March 2005.

He died on 8 May 2018.

Political offices
| Preceded by Selim al-Hoss | Minister of Foreign Affairs and Emigrants; 2000–2003 | Succeeded by Jean Obeid |
| Preceded by Khalil Hrawi | Minister of National Defense; 2003–2004 | Succeeded by Abdul Rahim Mourad |
| Preceded by Jean Obeid | Minister of Foreign Affairs and Emigrants; 2004–2005 | Succeeded by Fawzi Salloukh |
