= Mar Mikhael Agreement =

Memorandum of understanding signed in Lebanon on 6 February 2006

Mar Mikhael Agreement (or Mar Mikhael Understanding or memorandum of understanding between the FPM and Hezbollah, Arabic: تفاهم مار مخايل) is a memorandum of understanding signed on 6 February 2006 between the Christian Michel Aoun, the leader of the Free Patriotic Movement, and the Shiite Hassan Nasrallah of Hezbollah, in the Mar Mikhael Church in Haret Hreik, in Dahieh, Lebanon. The agreement established an alliance that influenced and changed the Lebanese politics since then, establishing the two parties' common goals, including helping Aoun getting to the presidency in 2016, and in return the FPM giving Hezbollah a Christian political support, and a cover for its military presence, including their 2006 War with Israel.

In 2021, on the 15th anniversary of the MoU, the FPM said that its alliance with Hezbollah should be re-examined.

In January 2022, FPM President, Gebran Bassil, said in a televised speech he was not ready to end the Mar Mikhael agreement with Hezbollah, but it should be "improved" to meet new economic and financial challenges.

== The text (10 articles) ==
=== Dialogue ===
The memorandum called for a national dialogue, as the only solution to the problems in Lebanon. It also encouraged all that all political sides should engage in full transparency in all national matters, which requires a general consensus.

=== Consensus democracy ===
Consociational and consensus democracy is the basis of governing, as it represents the constitution and coexistence pact in Lebanon. The practice of "true democracy" and "majority-minority" remains dependent on the fulfillment of the historical and social conditions for the actual democratic practice in which the citizen becomes a self-standing value.

=== Electoral law ===
The reform and regularity of political life necessitates reliance on an electoral law, of which proportional representation may be one of its effective forms, in a way that guarantees the fairness of popular representation and contributes to the following:

1. Activating and developing the work of political parties, leading to the establishment of civil society.
2. Reducing the influence of political money and sectarian fanaticism.
3. Providing equal opportunities of using and access to different media organization.
4. Securing the necessary means to enable the Lebanese expatriates to exercise their electoral right. The government is required to adhere to the shortest possible deadlines for the approval of the required electoral law.

=== State-building ===
To build a modern state that have the trust of its citizens and provides the safety of their present and future. One of the terms is relying on efficiency and justice (including judicial independence), respecting all constitutional institutions, and fighting corruption.

=== Missing people during the war ===
"Turning the page" of the civil war, and a global reconciliation should be resolved, so the FPM and Hezbollah are asking all other parties full cooperation to reveal the fate of the missing people and the locations of mass graves.

=== Lebanese people in Israel ===
The presence of a Lebanese citizen in their homeland is better than on an enemy's territories (Israel), so Nasrallah and Aoun are asking every Lebanese citizen in Israel to come back immediately to Lebanon.

=== Security of Lebanon ===
The two sides are condemning every kind of political assassination, especially the assassination of Rafic Hariri and Gebran Tueni, calling for the investigations to continue in order to achieve justice and stop the ongoing situation of assassinations and bombings. They are also calling the government to make a full security plan, neutralizing the security institutions from politics, without any infringement of freedom and political activities.

=== Lebanese–Syrian relations ===
The establishment of diplomatic relations between Lebanon and Syria must be based on mutual respect of the sovereignty and independence of both states and refusing any kind of External guardianship, confirming that the Shebaa Farms is actually a Lebanese territory and the demarcation of borders would benefit the two countries, and Syria is demanded to reveal the fate of the Lebanese detainees in its prisons.

=== Lebanese–Palestinian relations ===
Palestinians are asked to respect the authority of the Lebanese state, and the state should try to develop the living standards in the camps in accordance with the mutual cooperation, the human rights and the requirements for decent living, as well facilitating moving in and out the country. Lebanon is sympathetic to the Palestinian cause, but refuses any kind of naturalization.

=== Sovereignty and Independence of Lebanon ===
Defending the sovereignty and independence of Lebanon is a "national duty", so Hezbollah does not consider carrying arms as a goal in itself, but as a way to practice the resistance to free Lebanese occupied lands. In this context, Hezbollah's weapons must come within a comprehensive approach that falls between two limits:

The first limit is to rely on the justifications that meet the national consensus and form the strengths of the Lebanese in maintaining weapons, and the other limit is to define the objective conditions that lead to he absence of reasons and justifications for the weapons.

Since Israel is occupying the Shebaa Farms, the Lebanese must assume their responsibilities of protecting Lebanon, preserving its existence and security, preserving its independence and sovereignty, freeing the Lebanese prisoners and protecting Lebanon from Israel's attack by drafting a national defense strategy on which all the Lebanese agree.

== See also ==
- Maarab agreement
- 2008 Lebanon conflict
