= Nadine Moussa =

Lebanese lawyer and political activist

Nadine Moussa is a Lebanese lawyer, political activist, women's rights advocate and civil society volunteer. Moussa ran for the 2014 Lebanese general election. She also ran as an independent candidate for the 2014 Lebanese presidential election. She was the first woman to run for presidency in Lebanon. The presidential election was postponed to 2016. The general election was postponed to 2017 and again until 2018. She did not win either contest.

== Professional career ==
After studying law at the Saint Joseph University (Beirut) and completing a Masters in International Law at the Pantheon-Sorbonne University (Paris), Nadine Moussa engaged in a lawyer career in Lebanon starting in 1995. She has been a member of the Lebanon Bar Association since 1995, and in 2009 she was named coordinator of the Bar Association Committee for Family Affairs for a year. She was active in proposing amendments and modifications on national legislation affecting children's welfare, women rights and issues, social security, and related economic and social issues.

In 2012, she was appointed as a legal expert/consultant for the United Nations Development Programme in charge of compiling a working draft for Lebanon's food safety law for the head of the Parliamentary Committee for Public Health, Labor and Social affairs of the Lebanese Parliament.

== Civil society activism ==
At the time of her candidacy Nadine Moussa has been an active member of Lebanese civil society for more than ten years. Her actions earned her a selection as one of Lebanon's top 130 women leaders in The Women Leaders Directory 2013, published by Media Supporting Women, a project supported by NGOs Women in Front and the Smart Center.

=== Women’s rights and empowerment ===
Nadine Moussa founded the National Committee for Women’s Empowerment in Lebanon in 2004 whereby she provided legal advice to Lebanese women elected to public office. Since 2010 she has also been a member of the Arab Women’s Leadership Institute (AWLI).

=== Anti corruption ===
Nadine Moussa founded the Lebanese Association to Prevent Corruption in 2009. The association was built from a core of six original members to a large advocacy group of some 700 members by 2014. In 2011, she was invited by the G-8's Broader Middle East and North Africa Initiative to speak at two forums (Marseille & Marrakech, 2011) on anti-corruption and the promotion of democracy in the Arab world.

=== Human rights ===
In 2010, she won the release of a group of detainees at Roumieh Prison, using funds from the Lebanese Association to Prevent Corruption to pay their penalties and bail bonds. In 2011, she won a court judgment in the case of Saada Slim, an illiterate 63-year-old woman who had been held as a domestic servant in the same household for 50 years.

Nadine Moussa is a member of the Coalition of Civil Society Organizations in Lebanon (CCSOL). In 2010 and 2011, she was also selected by France's Ministry of Justice to participate in two workshops for Francophone legal experts (Amman, 2010 & Beirut, 2011) and by Justice without Frontiers to participate in a three-day international law workshop in The Hague (2011). She also took part in a National Consultation organized by the Women's International League for Peace and Freedom in Beirut in 2012.

== Political life ==
=== Parliamentary elections of 2013 ===
Nadine Moussa registered as candidate for the Mount Lebanon district of Metn in Lebanon's parliamentary elections that were supposed to take place in April–June 2013. Her candidacy was supported by Take Back Parliament - Lebanon, an independent secular youth political movement. The results ended in controversy with Moussa and 48 other independent candidates claiming victory.

=== Presidential campaign 2014 ===
Nadine Moussa campaigned for the 2014 Lebanese presidential election as an independent candidate. She was the first woman to have ever run for presidency in Lebanon.

The main objectives for her presidential mandate were the following:

1- To fight against corruption which is spread widely in the political class by lifting the bank secrecy on her personal accounts, those of her relatives and her staff.

2- To form a government with two priorities: maintaining security and holding the parliamentary elections 7 months following the start of my mandate, in accordance with the new electoral law, preferably based on proportionality.

3- To stimulate the new parliament into starting a legislative workshop to issue executive laws that organize the state's work, following the necessity to go back to the constitutional reform program and the issuance of executive constitutional laws. Also, to push for the implementation of additional executive laws in the Constitution:

- A law organizing the presidential departments and their work
- An electoral law to ensure the parliamentary system, the monitoring and the accountability.
- A law organizing the work of the council of ministers, as it constitutes the executive power.
- A law organizing the Prime Minister's departments and their work.
- A law achieving the judiciary power's independence, while maintaining the concept of the separation of powers and subjecting the officials and the civilians to the rule of law.
- A law organizing the LAF in accordance with the Constitution and the National Agreement.
- A law organizing security apparatuses (army intelligence, general security, state security and their links to all the authorities).
- A law organizing the state's administration (the ministries, the administrations and the ministries’ structure).
- An administrative decentralisation Policy.
- A law re-organizing media outlets.

4- To create a citizen's state based on a new social contract by organizing a national convention that adds together all national components to get back to the prevailing social contract in Lebanon, in order to discuss and lay down foundations for a modern state socially, economically and culturally. This invitation shall not only include leaders of political parties that participated to the Lebanese Civil War. It would also combine the elite representing the civil society and economic, syndical, youth, intellectual, academic and artistic institutions, as well as the political and the public administration experts.

5- In terms of human rights, to push for the parliamentary adoption of a retirement plan, a health insurance system for all citizens, and a free education plan. Also, to push to eliminate the laws that treat women with discrimination.

6- To work on amending the law related to oil and to present a draft for the plan regarding the issuance of a law tackling the exploitation of natural resources and distributing 50% of its revenues to the Lebanese people and the other 50% to the state.

7- To tighten the relationship between the president and the people by implementing the following initiatives:

- Creating a presidential website that allows everyone to address public issues and vote electronically.
- Involving civilians through a weekly online session, informing them with transparency about the achievements accomplished, and the reason behind failure of some while stating my position regarding the weekly events and causes.
- Dedicating one hour weekly to directly chat with the citizens via Twitter.
- Dedicating half of the president's salary to establish a work crew in the Presidential Palace constituted of young people under 30 years old, in order to encourage them to participate in the political scene and play a national and natural role as decision makers.

=== Parliamentary elections of 2014 - 2018 ===
Nadine Moussa registered as an independent candidate for the Mount Lebanon district of Metn in Lebanon's on September 11, 2014. The election was postponed to 2017 and again until 2018. She did not win. See also: Candidates of the 2018 Lebanese general election

== Private life ==
Nadine Moussa is married and has two daughters.
