= Tripartite Accord (Lebanon) =

The Tripartite Accord (Arabic: الإتفاق الثلاثي) of 1985 was a short-lived agreement between the three major Lebanese feuding factions, signed in Damascus, Syria, to end the Lebanese Civil War. The agreement allowed a Syrian peace-keeping military presence in Lebanon to separate the factions and gave Syria strong influence over Lebanese matters.

The three factions concerned were the Shia Amal movement, the Druze Progressive Socialist Party and the Christian Lebanese Forces (LF). The accord was signed on December 28, 1985, by Nabih Berri, Walid Jumblat, and Elie Hobeika on behalf of the three militias, respectively. As part of the agreement the parties pledged to disband their militias within 12 months.

== Aftermath ==
Some Christian politicians and clergy criticized the accord for giving Syria power over Lebanon and for weakening the Christian community. Elie Hobeika signed for the LF as its president, but the LF command council was split on whether he could and whether to accept the accord. In particular, the LF chief of staff Samir Geagea was opposed to the accord. The situation deteriorated into the violent Geagea-Hobeika Conflict, resulting in Hobeika fleeing on January 15, 1986. Samir Geagea and Karim Pakradouni took over the Lebanese Forces.

== See also ==
- List of Middle East peace proposals
