= Maarab =

Maarab معراب
- Village
- Location in Lebanon
- Coordinates: 33°59′52″N 35°40′54″E
- Country: Lebanon
- Governorate: Keserwan-Jbeil
- District: Keserwan
- Time zone: UTC+2 (EET)
  - Summer (DST): +3

Maarab (Arabic: معراب, romanized: Miʿrāb) is a village located in the Keserwan District of the Keserwan-Jbeil Governorate in Lebanon.

== History ==
Ottoman tax records, which did not differentiate between Muslim communities, indicate Maarab had a population 15 Muslim households and three imams in 1523, 16 Muslim households in 1530, and 17 Muslim households in 1543.

== Notable residents ==
- Samir Geagea, the executive chairman of the Lebanese Forces: the town hosted the Maarab Agreement, which holds the town's name, and is a political agreement made in Samir Geagea's headquarter between his Lebanese Forces and the Free Patriotic Movement, which is famous to have paved the way for Michel Aoun to become the president of the country.

== Bibliography ==
- Bakhit, Muhammad Adnan Salamah (February 1972). The Ottoman Province of Damascus in the Sixteenth Century (PhD). School of Oriental and African Studies, University of London.
