= Alma, Lebanon =

Village in Zgharta District, Lebanon

Coordinates: 34.4333°N 35.9000°E

Alma (Arabic: علما), also spelled Aalma, is a village in the Zgharta District, in the North Governorate of Lebanon. Its population is Maronite Christians and Sunni Muslim.

== Demographics ==
In 2014, Christians made up 74.05% and Muslims made up 25.64% of registered voters in Alma. 67.37% of the voters were Maronite Catholics and 25.29% were Sunni Muslims.
