= Sethrida Geagea =

Lebanese politician

- ستريدا جعجع
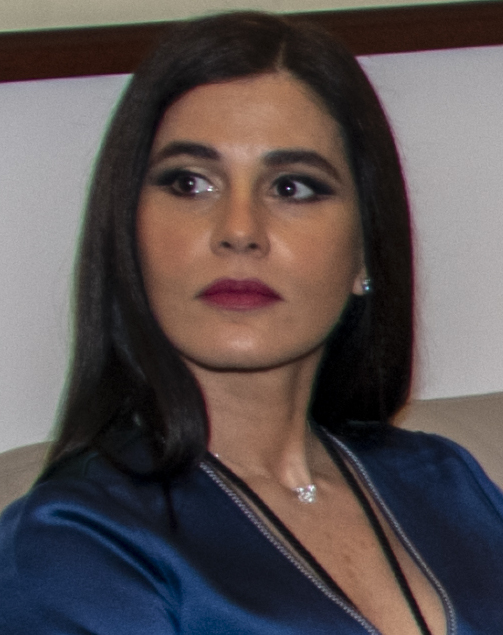
- Geagea in 2019

Member of the Lebanese Parliament
- Incumbent
- Assumed office 20 June 2005
- Constituency: Bsharri (2005, 2009, 2018, 2022)

Lebanese Forces Chairwoman (Acting)
- In office 1 April 1994 – 26 July 2005
- Preceded by: Samir Geagea
- Succeeded by: Samir Geagea

Cedar’s Mountain Foundation President
- Incumbent
- Assumed office June 2007

Personal details
- Born: Sethrida Tawk; May 31, 1967 (age 59) Kumasi, Ghana
- Party: Lebanese Forces
- Spouse: Samir Geagea (m. 1990)
- Education: Lebanese American University (BS)

Sethrida Tawk Geagea (Arabic: ستريدا طوق جعجع; born 31 May 1967), is a Lebanese politician and MP since June 2005 from the Bcharri district. She is also a member of the executive committee of the Lebanese Forces, headed by her husband, Samir Geagea. She contributed greatly to the management of the Lebanese Forces Party whilst Samir Geagea was imprisoned between 1994 and 2005.

== Early life ==
Sethrida Geagea is from a prominent Maronite Lebanese Tawk family that owned businesses in West Africa (Ghana). Her political activism began while at the Lebanese American University (LAU) and it led to meeting the leader of the Lebanese Forces (LF), Samir Geagea, whom she married in 1990. She earned a BS in political science in 1994.

== Political career ==
In 1994, the Syrian occupation of Lebanon led to the banning of the Lebanese Forces party and the imprisonment of its leader Samir Geagea. Following the political ban, MP Sethrida Geagea took charge as chairwoman of the party and sustained the link between the party's supporters and their imprisoned leader.

In 1998, after four years of forced political inactivity, the Lebanese Forces party, supervised by Sethrida, scored an impressive victory in the municipal and "mukhtar" elections. Lebanese Forces candidates built subtle alliances and benefited from the efficiency and strong discipline of its members. They won nearly 300 municipal seats in the five "Muhafazas", dominating more than 30 municipal councils. The same year witnessed the first encounter between Sethrida and Lebanese Prime Minister Rafic Hariri.

In 2001, Sethrida joined the Qornet Shehwan Gathering, a political organization founded on 30 April 2001 by a total of 29 individuals, representing political parties and civic organizations, as well as independents, with the blessing of the Maronite Patriarch Nasrallah Boutros Sfeir. In August 2001, the reconciliation of the Jabal took place through an initiative by Maronite Patriarch Nasrallah Butros Sfeir, in which the Christians and Druze sects put behind them the political differences and the thousands of deaths in the Chouf and Mount Lebanon. As commemoration of the historic reconciliation, MP Sethrida Geagea led the preparations and the ceremonies of welcoming the Patriarch in multiple Christian villages and towns, a celebration that lasted for two days.

In November 2003, following the reconciliation of the Jabal, Sethrida visited Al Barouk Area to offer condolences after the death of the Druze Sheikh Abou Hassan Aref Halawi.

In December 2004, Sethrida pushed forward a parliamentary pardon bill for her spouse and Lebanese Forces leader Samir Geagea, with the support of the Maronite Patriarch Nasrallah Boutros Sfeir. The patriarch, who has continuously called for Samir Geagea's release, stated that he hoped the petition would lead to a complete conciliation in Lebanon, so that the Lebanese can start rebuilding their country. The end of 2004 witnessed prime minister Rafic Hariri and leader of the Progressive Socialist Party Walid Jumblatt signing the pardon bill, a political turning point that concluded in Jumblatt's visit to Sethrida's residence in Yasou El Malak. In the same year, Sethrida joined the Bristol Gathering, the largest multi-sectarian opposition bloc in the history of Lebanon, which gave birth later on to the March 14 Movement, which led to the Syrian withdrawal from Lebanon after the assassination of Prime Minister Rafic Hariri on 14 February 2005.

== Cedars International Festival ==
In June 2015, MP Sethrida Geagea relaunched the Cedars International Festival (CIF) after almost half a century of inactivity. The festival, held since 1964, was interrupted in the early seventies due to the circumstances that were controlling Lebanon at that time. The first year's edition, themed “Language of the Spirit”, featured renowned local artists including Wael Kfoury, Elissa, Najwa Karam, Joseph Attieh, Michel Fadel, Abir Nehme & the Notre Dame University Choir led by Father Khalil Rahme, the Mafi Metlo comedy show and rap group Mn el-Ekher.

In 2016, the second year's festival paid tribute to Bsharri's legendary philosopher Gibran Khalil Gibran. In her opening speech, MP Sethrida Geagea renewed determination to entrench the Lebanese further in their land and their nation. The event opened with an orchestral performance by Lebanese iconic singer Majida El Roumi, followed by a concert featuring Lebanese superstars Nancy Ajram and Assi El Hallani and closed with a two-night dancing performance by the internationally acclaimed Caracalla Dance Theatre.

The 2017 edition was a tribute to the Cedar tree of Lebanon, the country's national symbol. During the opening ceremony attended by the Maronite Catholic Patriarch of Antioch Moran Mor Bechara Boutros al-Rahi, MP Sethrida Geagea greeted the Lebanese Cedar tree from Bsharri to Barouk, Jaj, Tannourine and every spot on the Lebanese soil. The event opened with a 3D mapping show followed by an orchestral operetta featuring twelve of Lebanon's biggest singers. The operetta, written by poet Nizar Francis and composed by Michel Fadel, was performed by Walid Toufic, Ghassan Saliba, Najwa Karam, Nancy Ajram, Moeen Charif, Melhem Zein, Abir Nehme, Joseph Attieh, Ramy Ayach, Zein El Omr, Tania Kassis and Eliya Francis. The third edition closed with a performance by Lebanese soprano Hiba Tawaji, orchestrated by Oussama Rahbani, directed by Marwan Rahbani and included 120 musicians, dancers and artists.

In 2018, the Cedars International Festival opened with a historical concert by world sensation Shakira, part of her El Dorado world tour. The concert, attended by thousands of fans, was highlighted by Shakira's speech, where she said she was proud to be singing in the land of her grandparents. This festival's edition, tributed by MP Sethrida Geagea to five Lebanse World Heritage sites (Kadisha Valley & Forest of the Cedars of God, Tyre, Byblos, Baalbek, Anjar) marked the return of legendary singer Majida El Roumi to the CIF in a performance that included a 3D-enabled operetta entitled “Hal Arz Min Talo”. The operetta, featuring 80 professional dancers, 70 orchestral musicians and 60 choir singers, was written by poet Nizar Francis, composed by Joseph Khalife, arranged by Marc Abou Naoum and led by maestro Lubnan Baalbaki.

In 2019, the Cedars International Festival opened with an orchestral performance by the renowned genre-bursting Italian tenor and multi-instrumentalist Andrea Bocelli. The concert, featuring MP Sethrida Geagea presenting Bocelli with an 18-karat gold medal, was sold out in less than two days. In this struggle-themed edition of the festival, MP Sethrida Geagea said “The struggle of the Lebanese people in their country on the human, social and livelihood levels ... because in our beloved homeland we all share a state of daily struggle, the citizen’s struggle to stay and survive and live with dignity.” The festival concluded with Smile Lebanon, a play performed by Lebanon's biggest names in comedy.

== Cedar’s Mountain Foundation ==
In June 2007, MP Sethrida Geagea founded Cedar's Mountain Foundation (CMF), a non profit, non-governmental organization, dedicated to sustainable development of Bsharri caza on multiple levels (economic, social, agricultural, educational, environmental).

The construction of Dbayeh-located Student's House was completed in April 2018. It's a $16 million, 6,500 m2 student housing project, consisting of 121 rooms and multiple high-end amenities.

In April 2020, CMF's president MP Sethrida Geagea announced in a press conference the kickoff of the finalization of Bsharri's governmental hospital. The Antoine Al-Khoury Malakeh Tawk governmental hospital launch has been possible thanks to the agreement signed between CMF and "Abniah" construction company. Donations from good-will and generous individuals and entities, some desiring to remain undisclosed, amounted to US$1,200,000 and LBP 50,000,000. The initial launch cost has been cut by approximately US$710,000, thus reducing the amount from US$3,057,000 to US$2,346,000, thanks to MP Geagea's efforts and solid public ties.

In July 2020, Cedar's Mountain Foundation announced the restoration of 4 ancient sites in the Valley of the Saints, also known as the Valley of Qannoubine or the Valley of Kadisha. The achievement was celebrated in an event under the patronage of the Maronite Catholic Patriarch of Antioch Moran Mor Bechara Boutros al-Rahi, who toured the heritage sites in the Kadisha Valley alongside MP Sethrida Geagea. “We will not leave our land and we will remain in Lebanon for which we have made the most precious sacrifices”, said MP Geagea while announcing the launching of world-class religious tourism.

== See also ==
- Lebanese Forces
- Samir Geagea
- List of Lebanese Forces Deputies in the Lebanese Parliament
