= Elie Hobeika =

Lebanese politician and militia commander

- إيلي حبيقة
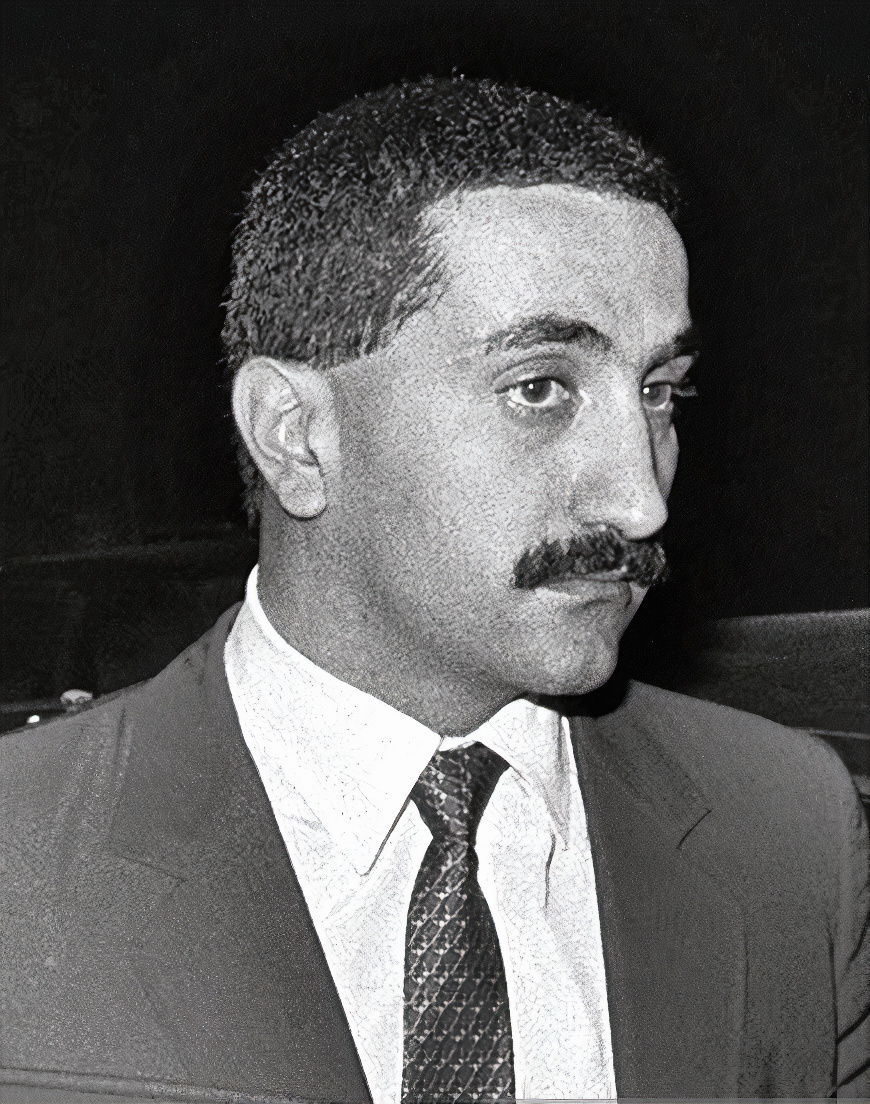
- Elie Hobeika in 1985

Leader of the Lebanese Forces
- In office 1985–1986
- Preceded by: Fouad Abou Nader
- Succeeded by: Samir Geagea

Personal details
- Born: Elias Joseph Hobeika; 22 September 1956 Baskinta, Lebanon
- Died: 24 January 2002 (aged 45) Hazmiyeh, Lebanon
- Cause of death: Assassination
- Party: Promise Party
- Other political affiliations: Kataeb Party (Until 1986)
- Spouse: Gina Raymond Nachaty
- Children: Joseph Hobeika
- Parent(s): Joseph Hobeika, Badr Salman al-Reef
- Nickname: HK

Military service
- Allegiance: Kataeb Regulatory Forces; Lebanese Forces
- Branch/service: Lebanese Forces
- Rank: Commander
- Battles/wars: Lebanese Civil War

Elie Hobeika (also transliterated as Hubayqa; Arabic: إيلي حبيقة; 22 September 1956 – 24 January 2002) was a Lebanese militia commander in the Lebanese Forces militia during the Lebanese Civil War and one of Bachir Gemayel's close confidants. He became infamous for his overseeing of the 1982 Sabra and Shatilla massacre. Hobeika initially supported the IDF during their invasion, but later switched sides and supported the Syrians. He became head of the Lebanese Forces until he was ousted in 1986. He then founded the Promise Party and was elected to serve two terms in the Parliament of Lebanon. In January 2002, he was assassinated in a car bombing at his house in Beirut, shortly before he was to testify about the Sabra and Shatila massacre in a Belgian court.

== Early life ==
Elias Joseph Hobeika was born in Qleiat in Keserwan District, Lebanon, to a Maronite family on 22 September 1956. According to The Guardian, he was deeply influenced by the deaths of much of his family and his fiancée at the hands of Palestinian militiamen in the Damour massacre of 1976.

== Lebanese Civil War ==
Hobeika distinguished himself as a ruthless fighter in the Lebanese Civil War, gaining the nickname "HK" after the Heckler & Koch machine gun he carried. In July 1977, Hobeika, then only known under the pseudonym "Chef Edward", led a massacre against civilians and Palestinian people in the south Lebanese village of Yarin where about 80 people of which probably 20 to 30 were civilians were lined up in front of the school and shot.

He steadily became prominent in the Phalange, part of the pro-Christian Kataeb Party, which had defeated rival Christian militias by July 1980 and incorporated them into the Lebanese Forces (LF). In 1978, Hobeika became head of the LF's security agency (Jihaz al-Amn). He also became a personal bodyguard of Bachir Gemayel. In the years that followed, he developed close ties with both the Israeli military and the American Central Intelligence Agency (CIA).

During Israel's 1982 invasion of Lebanon, Hobeika was the liaison officer to Mossad. On 15 September, following the assassination of President-elect Bachir Gemayel the previous day, the Israeli army took over West Beirut. Minister of Defence Ariel Sharon and Chief of Staff General Raful Eitan had decided that the Israel Defense Forces (IDF) would not enter the Palestinian refugee camps but this task should be undertaken by Lebanese Christian militias. On the night of 16 September 1982, Hobeika, then 25, was on the top floor of the Israeli forward command post, when the first 150 militiamen entered the Sabra and Shatila camps, which had been evacuated by the Palestine Liberation Organization (PLO) at the beginning of September. Two hours after the first Phalangist force entered Shatila, one of the militiamen radioed Hobeika asking what to do with 50 women and children they had taken prisoner. Hobeika's response was overheard by an Israeli officer, who testified that Hobeika replied: "This is the last time you're going to ask me a question like that; you know exactly what to do." Other Phalangists on the roof started laughing. Brigadier General Amos Yaron asked Lieutenant Elul, Chef de Bureau of the Divisional Commander, what the laughter was about and Elul translated what Hobeika had said. Yaron then had a five-minute conversation, in English, with Hobeika. What was said is unknown. Over the next three days, the LF killed between 762 and 3,500 residents of the camp. Until 1985, Hobeika sided with Israel. However, then he began to support Syria's presence in Lebanon.

Hobeika was involved in another incident in March 1985. The CIA reportedly paid Hobeika (through Lebanese army intelligence officers) to assassinate Muhammad Hussein Fadlallah, the spiritual leader of the militant Shi'ite group Hezbollah, because Fadlallah was considered by US officials to have taken part in planning the October 1983 bombing of the US marine barracks in Beirut, which killed 241 servicemen. However, the assassination attempt was unsuccessful in that the car bombing near Fadlallah's residence killed around 80 bystanders, but left Fadlallah unscathed. The massacre led the CIA to terminate its relationship with Hobeika and gave Hezbollah a lasting grudge against him.

In December 1985, the various Christian militias, the Shiite Amal Movement and the Druze Progressive Socialist Party met in Damascus to reach an agreement on political reforms as well as special relations with Syria, called the Tripartite Accord, which would also end the civil war. Hobeika was there in his capacity as president of the LF. However, on 15 January 1986, President Amine Gemayel and Samir Geagea organised a coup against Hobeika, thus rendering the agreement null and void. Geagea was especially displeased that Hobeika had changed his allegiance to Syria.

After this event, Hobeika fled to Zahle and then to West Beirut. He established a political movement there, the Promise Party. In 1990, his forces fought with the Syrian forces against General Michael Aoun. After the civil war ended following the Taif Agreement, Hobeika benefited in 1991 from an amnesty for crimes committed during the war.

In June 2001, Chibli Mallat, a left-wing Maronite lawyer, filed a case against Ariel Sharon in Belgium under a law that allowed foreigners to be sued for crimes against humanity. Just before his death, Hobeika publicly declared his intention to testify against Sharon about his involvement in the Sabra and Shatila massacres in the Belgian court. Josy Dubié, a Belgian senator, was quoted as saying that Hobeika had told him several days before his death that he had "revelations" to disclose about the massacres and felt "threatened". When Dubié had asked him why he did not reveal all the facts he knew immediately, Hobeika is reported to have said: "I am saving them for the trial". At a news conference, he said, "I am very interested that the [Belgian] trial starts because my innocence is a core issue."

== Political career ==
As head of the Promise Party, Hobeika was elected to Parliament in 1992 and in 1996. During his term in the Parliament, he served in several ministerial positions: Minister of State for Emigrants' Affairs (May 1992-October 1992); Minister of State for Social Affairs and the Handicapped (October 1992-September 1994) and Minister of Water Resources and Electricity (June 1993-December 1998). When he was Minister of Water Resources and Electricity, massive power projects were constructed in Baddawi and Zahrani, Zouk and Baalbeck, and the size of the electrical grid was greatly increased, including the outlying areas still in turmoil with Israeli Forces in the south. However, progress was too slow compared to the massive increase the nation's power consumption, as few electrical projects were completed over 18 years of civil unrest. In 2000, Hobeika lost his parliament seat.

== Personal life ==
Hobeika married Gina Raymond Nachaty in 1981. They had a daughter, who died in infancy, and a son, Joseph.

== Death ==
Hobeika was killed on 24 January 2002 at the age of 45 when a car bomb detonated near his house in the Beirut suburb of Hazmiyeh. The explosion killed his three bodyguards as well, and wounded six more people.

=== Perpetrators ===
A group, Lebanese for a Free and Independent Lebanon, issued a statement after the assassination, claiming responsibility for the killing of Hobeika. The group announced that it killed Hobeika, since he was a "Syrian agent" and an "effective tool" in the hands of Ghazi Kenaan, the then head of Syrian military intelligence.

Lebanese and Arab commentators blamed Israel for the murder of Hobeika, with alleged Israeli motive that Hobeika would be "apparently poised to testify before the Belgian court about Sharon's role in the Sabra and Shatila massacre". Prior to his assassination, Elie Hobeika had stated: "I am very interested that the [Belgian] trial starts because my innocence is a core issue."

Others have speculated that Syrian intelligence assassinated Hobeika, who had "specifically stated that he did not plan to identify Sharon as being responsible for Sabra and Shatila", to prevent him from testifying on Syrias involvement in the Massacre. Security sources have also noted the blast occurred in a high-security zone under total Syrian control, further claiming Damascus had a clear motive to silence Hobeika who possessed extensive knowledge of Syrian-directed war crimes, while using his death to manufacture a diplomatic crisis for the Ariel Sharon government.

=== Condemnation ===
President Emile Lahoud and Hezbollah condemned the assassination of Hobeika and blamed Israel.

== See also ==
- List of assassinated Lebanese politicians
- List of extrajudicial killings and political violence in Lebanon
