= Samir Geagea =

Lebanese politician (born 1952)

Samir Geagea سمير جعجع
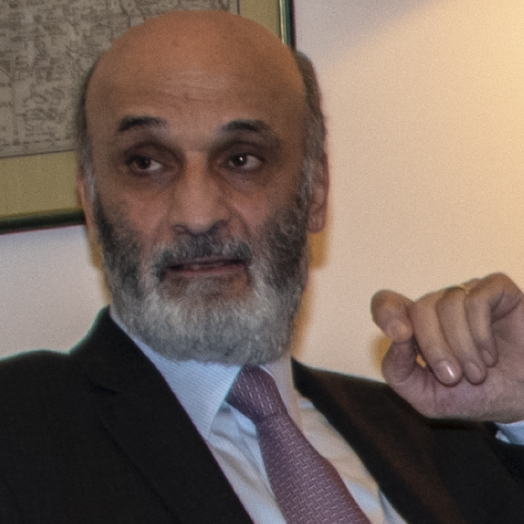

Executive Chairman of Lebanese Forces
- Incumbent
- Assumed office 15 January 1986
- Preceded by: Elie Hobeika

Personal details
- Born: 25 October 1952 (age 74) Ain El Remmaneh, Lebanon
- Party: Lebanese Forces
- Other political affiliations: Kataeb Party (until 1992); March 14 Alliance (until 2016); Lebanese Opposition (2019–present)
- Spouse: Sethrida Tawk (m. 1990)
- Education: American University of Beirut; Saint Joseph University
- Religion: Maronite Catholicism

Samir Farid Geagea (Arabic: سمير فريد جعجع, Lebanese Arabic: [saˈmiːɾ faˈɾiːd ˈʒaʕʒaʕ], also spelled Samir Ja'ja'; born 25 October 1952) is a Lebanese politician and former militia commander who has been the leader of the Lebanese Forces political party and former militia since 1986.

Born in Ain al-Remaneh, Geagea joined the nationalist Kataeb Party in his early years. He led the Northern Front in the Lebanese Forces from 1979 to 1984. In March 1985, after the deterioration of the Christian political situation in the eastern regions after the assassination of the Lebanese Forces leader Bachir Gemayel, he led, jointly with Elie Hobeika and Karim Pakradouni, an uprising that led to control of the political situation without any bloodshed. On 15 January 1986, Geagea led a coup against the tripartite agreement sponsored by Syria to become the commander of the Lebanese Forces after the overthrow of Elie Hobeika, head of the executive body at the time and one of the signatories of the tripartite agreement.

Geagea initially supported the "War of Liberation" declared by disputed Prime Minister General Michel Aoun against the Syrian Army. On 31 January 1990, the Lebanese Armed Forces led by Michel Aoun declared war on the Lebanese Forces, officially naming it "the War of the Unification of the Rifle," but later being referred to as the War of Elimination.

Under Geagea, the Lebanese Forces agreed to the Taif Accord peace agreement that ended the civil war and ceded control of its territory to the Lebanese Army, and sold their arms to Serbian factions fighting in the Yugoslav Wars in 1991. In accordance with the agreement, he immediately dissolved the military and security arm of the Lebanese Forces and surrendered all its military assets to the Lebanese Army. But as Beirut was under the control of the Syrian Army, the party members were subject to pressure and Syrian forces refused to withdraw as set out in the agreement.

On 24 January 1990, Geagea was appointed a Minister of State in the first post-war cabinet, led by Prime Minister Omar Karami. Geagea rejected the position due to the flagrant control of the cabinet by the Syrian regime. On 16 May 1992, Geagea was again appointed as a minister in the Rashid El Solh cabinet, only to refuse it again for the same reasons. In 1994, Geagea was arrested and put on trial for bombing a church and political killings in the war. He denied the accusations and claimed he was the target of a political prosecution fabricated by the Syrian-Lebanese security apparatus.

Geagea spent 11 years in solitary confinement. Following the Cedar Revolution, and the subsequent withdrawal of Syrian forces from Lebanon, a newly elected Lebanese Parliament voted to grant him amnesty on 18 July 2005.

== Early life and education ==
Geagea was born in the Ain el-Remmeneh district in Beirut on 25 October 1952 to a modest Maronite family from the town of Bsharri in northern Lebanon. His father, Farid Geagea was an adjutant in the Lebanese Army. His brother, Joseph, is a mathematician in Maryland. He attended "Ecole Bénilde" elementary and secondary school in Furn el-Chebek, which was a free private school. With the aid of a scholarship from the Khalil Gibran association, he studied medicine at the American University of Beirut and then at Saint Joseph University. After the outbreak of civil war in 1975, Geagea interrupted his four years studies at the American University of Beirut. He was an active member of the right-wing Phalangist Party, which became the main Christian fighting force upon the outbreak of the Lebanese Civil War in 1975. He is married to MP Sethrida Geagea.

== War period (1975–1990) ==
Geagea steadily rose through the ranks and led several operations at the request of Bachir Gemayel, then commander of the Phalangist Kataeb Regulatory Forces militia. In June 1978, following the murder of a Phalangist party leader Joud el Bayeh in the North Lebanon in a power struggle with former president Suleiman Frangieh, Bachir Gemayel ordered Geagea and Elie Hobeika to co-lead a unit to capture the suspects who were taking cover in Frangieh's mansion in Ehden. The incident is known as Ehden massacre. The attacking force (which somehow went past over dozens of Syrian army checkpoints) was met with resistance on the outskirts of Ehden where Geagea was hit. He was transported to Beirut and admitted to Hôtel-Dieu hospital in Achrafieh, Beirut where ironically he was doing his internship. His right hand was partially paralyzed and he never continued his education. Meanwhile, the military operation resulted in the murder of Tony Frangieh and his family. Geagea was later transported to a hospital in France.

Geagea was appointed head of the Lebanese Forces' (LF) militia northern Front in the early 1980s, where he commanded around 1,500 battle-hardened soldiers, drawn mainly from his native town of Bsharri and other towns and villages in Northern Lebanon. Geagea led his men in fierce battles against the Syrian Army in El-Koura, Qnat. From 1982 to 1983, Geagea commanded the Lebanese Forces against Walid Jumblatt's Progressive Socialist Party militia, the Palestinians, and the Syrians in a battle for control of the Chouf mountains in central Lebanon.

Following the Israeli withdrawal from Sidon on 15 February 1985 Geagea launched an LF offensive from the Christian villages East and North of Sidon targeting Ain al-Hilwa refugee camp as well as the city itself. By 24 April his fighters were forced to retreat resulting in the exodus of some 60,000 Maronites from the villages of Iqlim al-Kharrub.

On 1 April 1990, during the War of Liberation, Elias Hrawi’s government mandated Fleet Admiral Elie Hayek to take over LF barracks in the governorate. This was part of an agreement between Geagea and Hrawi whereby the army would militarily and politically take over 2/3 of the canton (the remaining 1/3 being the Northern governorate and Achrafieh in East Beirut), but the militia’s 10,000 strong force would remain intact for the time being.

Michel Aoun, however, had publicly stated that he would not accept the handoff or any alliance between the LF and the Hrawi government. As the Elimination War was ravaging East Beirut and its suburbs (up to the Metn), the handoff actually began in Keserwan district – at the level of Nahr el-Kalb – up to Barbara. By May, however, the LF had taken over the entire coastline from Jounieh to Beirut from Aoun’s troops, completely cutting off naval supply routes. In addition, Geagea placed Hayek in an LF barrack in Jounieh as a symbol of his willingness to integrate with the government, defying Aoun’s refusal of any Hrawi-LF alliance. These developments, combined with the Syrian army’s support, dramatically shifted the odds in favour of the Taif agreement and its government.

=== Lebanese Forces ===
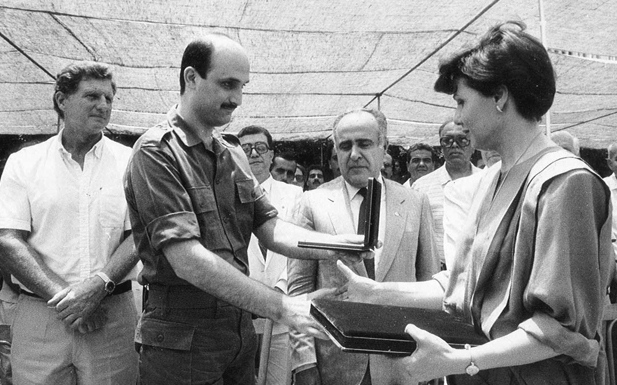
Samir Geagea and daughter of William Hawi – Leila

On 12 March 1985, Geagea and Elie Hobeika orchestrated an internal coup in order to end the leadership of Fouad Abou Nader in the Lebanese Forces. Abou Nader was considered to be too close to his uncle, president Amine Gemayel whose policies were not accepted by most LF leaders. On 15 January 1986, Geagea became head of the Lebanese Forces after overthrowing Hobeika, who was widely accused of treachery in the Lebanese Christian sector for agreeing to a Syrian-sponsored accord (the Tripartite Accord). During the following year, Geagea meticulously rebuilt the LF into an organized, well-trained and equipped military force, one of the most advanced forces ever on Lebanese soil. He established social security and public services to fill the void that was created by the war-crippled state administration. He also extracted taxes from the Christian region, offered free open-heart operations and twinned Christians cities with foreign cities in Europe and America and tried to open an airport in the Halat region because the Beirut International Airport (located in the west suburb of Beirut) was under the control of the Syrian forces which made the access for Lebanese Christians almost impossible.

== The post-war period (1990) ==
In February 1990, General Michel Aoun launched an offensive attempting to dislodge Geagea’s Lebanese Forces from East Beirut. During the fighting the Christian areas of Beirut suffered greater destruction and more casualties than at any time during 15 years of civil war.

On 13 October 1990, Syria ousted General Aoun from the presidential palace in Baabda. Aoun was heading an interim government which filled the void in the absence of a presidential election after the end of President Amin Gemayel's term in office. With Aoun out of the picture, Geagea was now the only leader in the Christian heartland. Geagea was subsequently offered ministerial portfolios in the new Lebanese government (formed on Christmas Eve).

=== Relations with the Kataeb party ===
In addition to being the LF leader, Geagea retained his seat in the Kataeb Politburo. In 1992, he ran for the Kataeb presidential election but lost to Georges Saadeh with whom the conflict grew. Later that year, Saadeh dismissed Geagea and all members of what was known as the "Rescue Committee" from the party. The committee was formed by several members of the Politburo and districts leaders loyal to the LF and Geagea.

=== Arrest and trial ===
There was increased pressure by Syria on Geagea to accept the Syrian presence or face charges. Prior to his arrest, he was contacted by several sympathetic politicians and warned about the forthcoming proceedings and offered safe passage out of Lebanon. Geagea refused to leave. The Syrians exploited the vulnerabilities of the amnesty law promulgated by then president Elias Hrawi for all the crimes and atrocities committed before 1990. This law also stated that any crime committed after that date will void the effect of the amnesty. On 26 January 1994, Geagea went to Qardaha, Syria to offer his condolences to President Hafez al-Assad, following the death of his son Bassel in a car accident. During his visit to Syria, president's brother-in-law, Mohammed Makhlouf, asked him to talk with Syrian officers, but Geagea said that he only came for the funeral, which was considered as a refusal to cooperate with the Syrians.

On 27 February 1994, a bomb exploded in the Church of Sayyidet Al Najet (Our Lady of Deliverance) in the locality of Zouk Mikael, killing 9 worshipers and injuring many. It is disputed who perpetrated the bombing, but Geagea was accused of the crime allegedly for the purpose of voiding the effect of the amnesty law of which he benefited. On 23 March 1994, the Lebanese government ordered the dissolution of the LF and Geagea's deputy Fouad Malek was taken into custody. Geagea himself was arrested on 21 April 1994 in his village Ghadras, on charges of ordering the church bombing, of attempting to undermine government authority by "maintaining a militia in the guise of a political party", of instigating acts of violence, and of committing assassinations during the Lebanese Civil War. He was accused of the assassinations of former prime minister Rashid Karami, National Liberal Party leader Dany Chamoun and his family, and former LF member Elias Al Zayek. He was also accused of attempting to kill Minister Michel Murr. He was acquitted in the church case but given four life sentences in the other cases. Geagea would become the only wartime leader who went to jail because of crimes committed during the war and after the Taif Accord. Amnesty International criticized Geagea's trial and conviction, citing that it was politically motivated and unjust.

=== Imprisonment ===
Geagea was incarcerated for 11 years in a small windowless solitary cell in the third basement level of the Lebanese Ministry of Defense in Yarze. His health status was jeopardized and he lost weight dramatically due to the unsanitary condition of the ill-lit and poorly ventilated prison cell. He was deprived of access to media and the outside world and was only allowed to see his wife and close relatives. All of Geagea's conversations were monitored and he was barred from talking politics with anyone.

For the duration of his incarceration, Geagea maintained that he meditated and reviewed his actions during the war to determine if what he did was right. He busied himself with reading literature, Hindu philosophy, the Qur'an, Christian theology and mysticism namely the works of Jesuit priest Teilhard de Chardin.

=== Release ===
Leaders of the Cedar Revolution considered the Geagea trials and sentences to be unjust, politically motivated, and orchestrated by the vassal government that ruled Lebanon during the Syrian occupation to oust Geagea from the political scene and dismantle the Lebanese Forces. When supporters of the Cedar Revolution won the majority in the 2005 parliamentary elections, they lobbied for an amnesty law to free Geagea from his disputed sentences.

The Lebanese Parliament passed an amnesty bill on 18 July 2005 to free Geagea. Given the sectarian balance of Lebanon, three dozen Islamist criminals were released with Geagea. The bill was subsequently signed by the then president Émile Lahoud. Geagea was released from prison on 26 July 2005 and left Lebanon for medical care. He returned to Lebanon on 25 October (his birthday), and lived in the Cedars region, his ancestral homeland, in northern Lebanon until 11 December 2006, after which he moved to a hotel in Bzoummar in Keserwan. On 30 June 2007, he moved to a new residence in Maarab, Keserwan.

== Current political activity ==
On the Lebanese political scene, Geagea and the LF are considered to be the main Christian component of the 14 March Alliance.

In September 2008, Geagea pronounced in front of thousands of rallying supporters in Jounieh a historical apology. The apology read:

I fully apologize for all the mistakes that we committed when we were carrying out our national duties during past civil war years,... I ask God to forgive, and so I ask the people whom we hurt in the past.

Internationally, Geagea tried to renew his relations with influential countries such as the United States and France. On 19 March 2007, he met then French president Jacques Chirac in the Élysée Palace. In March 2008, he held talks in the US with officials at the White House, including then Secretary of State Condoleezza Rice, then NSA Stephen Hadley and then chairman of the Foreign Affairs Subcommittee on the Middle East and South Asia Gary Ackerman.

A 2015 leak of documents from Saudi Arabia's Foreign Affairs Ministry revealed that Geagea had asked for money to pay for bodyguards and boasted of his "preparedness to do whatever the kingdom asks of him."

The Lebanese Forces made gains in the 15 May 2022 general elections. It became the largest Christian party in Parliament.

=== Assassination attempt (2012) ===
On 4 April 2012, at approximately 11:30 am, gunshots were heard in Geagea's Maarab complex. Geagea's security forces scouted the area, and found shells belonging to a 12.7 caliber sniper rifle, a high-tech rifle produced only by the United States and/or Russia, not available in the Lebanese infantries, the Lebanese Armed Forces or the black market, suggesting that the gun could only be obtained by one powerful party. Speculators claim the perpetrators to be pro-Syrian forces, most likely Hezbollah. Account of the story, as described in the press conference immediately following the attempt, claim Geagea to have been walking outside in the garden surrounding his mansion. Geagea bent over to pick up a flower, while bent over, Geagea heard gunshots, and immediately lay low on the ground, while his security forces took care of the situation. At the location where the shot would have killed him, two bullets had pierced through the wall. They claim the shooters to have been at least a kilometer away, stationed west of the residence (but the body guards were unable to see them due to the thick trees), and the operation to have been planned for months to silence Geagea, the only strong vocal critic against the Syrian/Iranian forces and the incumbent government. The Lebanese security forces have uncovered that a nine-member assassination team divided into three groups was involved in the killing attempt; two of the three groups were in charge of firing on Geagea.

The United States condemned the assassination attempt.

=== Candidacy for presidency (2014) ===
In 2014, Geagea declared his candidacy for the Lebanese presidential elections to succeed President Michel Suleiman, whose 6-year term was to end on 25 May 2014. Geagea enjoyed the comprehensive political backing of the March 14 Alliance for the presidency. Free Patriotic Movement's MP Michel Aoun said that he would insist on holding the parliamentary election on schedule if Future Movement's Saad Hariri did not support his candidacy for the presidency or if a new president will not be elected before September. Geagea challenged Aoun to run against him or move to a "plan B" that would enable a consensual candidate that is not considered partisan as being from either of the two political alliances, which, in addition to the two, are Phalange's Amine Gemayel and Marada Movement's Suleiman Frangieh.

After the sixth round of voting failed, Lebanese Democratic Party leader Talal Arslan suggested that the president should be directly elected by the people. In doing so, he said: "The presidential crisis is a major insult to the Lebanese nation. [sic] The only way to save the nation and restore respect to the presidency is by holding the election directly by the people." Lebanese Forces MP Antoine Zahra added that Geagea remained the party's candidate.

However, the country entered into a 2 years presidential deadlock, which ended in 2016, with Geagea backing up his longtime rival Michel Aoun for the presidency after fellow March 14 member Saad Hariri had decided to back March 8 candidate Suleiman Frangieh Jr through the Maarab Accord. Aoun was elected president, ending more than two years of presidential vacuum.

=== Lebanese crisis (2019–present) ===
During the beginning of the October 17 protests, Geagea called for the resignation of the Prime Minister, due to the "resounding failure to halt the deterioration of the [country's] economic situation". Geagea had previously blamed his opponents for "obstructing the necessary reforms," but since declared his "lack of confidence in the current cabinet." His party held four seats within the government: Minister of Labor Camille Abou Sleiman, Minister of Administrative Development May Chidiac, Deputy Prime Minister Ghassan Hasbani, and Minister of Social Affairs Richard Kouyumjian.

On 6 August 2020, Geagea was the first politician to visit Beirut after the explosion and launched from there a relief committee, Ground-0, under the leadership of the former minister Dr. May Chidiac to support in rebuilding Beirut. In December 2020, the committee achieved repairing 709 houses, assisted 5300 individuals and 2300 families, distributed 14000 food rations, made 2540 medical consultations, and provided 2030 individuals with medicine. In addition, the committee distributed more than 150 scholarships for Beirut schools' students.

After the 2021 Beirut clashes, Geagea was summoned by military intelligence to testify about the events, as both Hezbollah and the Amal Movement accused his party of instigating the violence. Geagea denied these allegations, asserting that his supporters acted in self-defense against an attack by Hezbollah loyalists who had vandalized property in the area. On the day he was scheduled to appear, Geagea did not show up, and his supporters protested the summons, blocking roads in support. On 14 October 2021, protests were held in the Tayouneh neighborhood of Beirut by supporters of Hezbollah and the Amal Movement; several of the demonstrators were armed. They were calling for the removal of Tarek Bitar, the judge appointed to investigate the Beirut port explosion in which Hassan Nasrallah called bias. The demonstrators were shot at by snipers from nearby buildings, though the latter's identity was unclear but Geagea's rivals alleged it was the Lebanese Forces.

After the elections of 2022, Geagea’s Lebanese Forces managed to win eighteen seats, up from fourteen seats making it the biggest party in the Lebanese parliament and the biggest Christian party in the country as for the first time the LF had surpassed the Free Patriotic Movement in votes largely due to further Christian distrust of Hezbollah. Being the last year of Aoun’s presidency, parliament was charged with electing a new president and the LF vowed to not allow any candidate close to Hezbollah and its allies to be elected. Similarly, Geagea’s MPs refused to vote for Amal Movement leader Nabih Berri who at the time had been Speaker of Parliament for then thirty years. Geagea faced the difficulties of a divided opposition as many of the newly elected “October 17” MPs refused to conform to the opposition’s decision to back candidates such as Michel Moawad and later Jihad Azour.

In 2022, Geagea was very critical of then-President Michel Aoun, describing Aoun as the “weakest president in Lebanon’s history” and added that "Michel Aoun sacrificed his people and nation for his personal gain,”

On August 2, 2025, a few days before a highly anticipated government meeting to discuss the disarmament of Hezbollah and the approve the executive mechanism to implement the state monopoly over arms, he was quoted saying: “Hezbollah’s actions have effectively set Lebanon back a hundred years, if not more,”.

== Relations ==
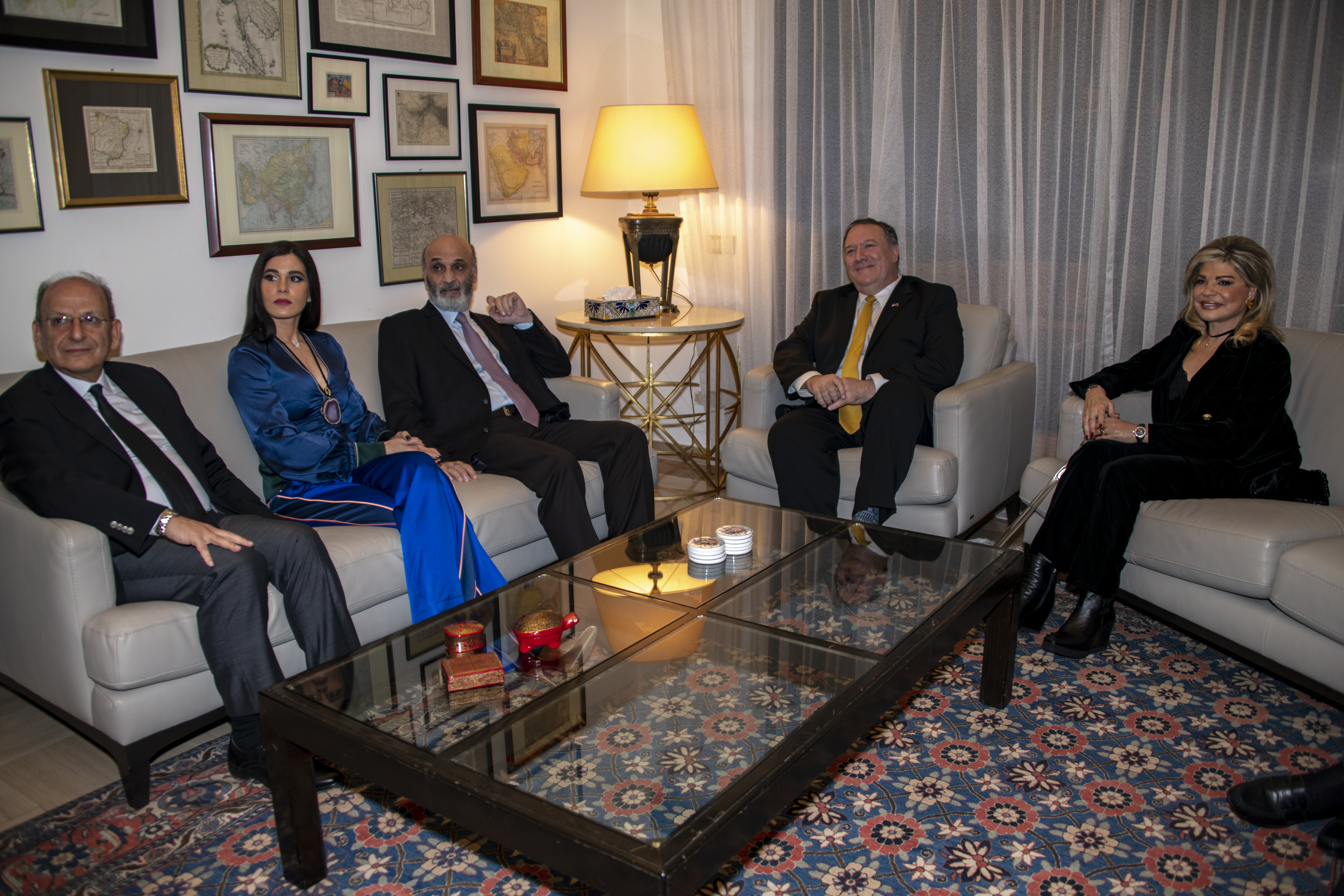
U.S. Secretary of State Michael R. Pompeo meets with Samir Geagea, Sethrida Tawk and May Chidiac in Beirut, Lebanon, on March 22, 2019

=== China ===
The Lebanese Forces party maintain a good relation with the Chinese Communist party.

On 23 November 2022, Geagea received an official invitation to visit China.

=== France ===
During Marine Le Pen’s 2017 visit to Lebanon, Geagea met with her but strongly disagreed with her pro-Assad stance, telling her directly that Bashar al-Assad is "a terrorist no different than the Islamic State." During her visit Geagea said that “Relations with France have always been good and we look forward to make them better in the future.”

After the 2020 Beirut explosion, Geagea refused Emmanuel Macron's request to name Mustapha Adib to form the government. During the 2022–2025 Lebanese presidential election, Geagea accused France of supporting Suleiman Frangieh to serves its common interest with Hezbollah. On 14 December 2023, Geagea declared that he no longer expected anything from France during an interview with French weekly magazine Valeurs actuelles.

=== Hezbollah ===
Geagea has consistently positioned the LF as a staunch opponent of Hezbollah, criticizing its military power and political influence in Lebanon. He has accused Hezbollah of undermining Lebanon's sovereignty. In a speech during an annual martyrs event, Geagea declared his readiness for an "all-out" confrontation against Hezbollah, labeling the group and its allies as the "axis of crime." He stated that Hezbollah would not be allowed to ascend to the presidential palace, indicating a firm stance against any political arrangements that would empower Hezbollah during the 2022 presidential elections. Geagea emphasized his refusal to negotiate with Hezbollah unless they let go of their primary candidate Suleiman Frangieh.

During the Israel–Hezbollah conflict, Geagea accused Hezbollah of initiating hostilities with Israel, stating that such actions have not benefited Lebanon or the Palestinian cause. He remarked that Hezbollah's military operations in southern Lebanon have resulted in significant loss of life and destruction of villages, asserting that these actions have not aided Gaza but rather harmed Lebanon. He has repeatedly called for the reinforcement and implementation of Resolution 1701.

In September 2024, in a speech he accused Hezbollah of "confiscating the Lebanese people's decision on war and peace, as if there were no state," and starting "a war [with Israel] that the Lebanese people reject, but has been imposed on them. It is a war that the Lebanese people do not want and over which the government has had no say. This war does not serve Lebanon, it has brought nothing to Gaza, nor alleviated its suffering one iota."

=== Kurdistan ===
On 18 January 2012, Geagea visited Iraqi Kurdistan where he received a hero's welcome in Erbil's predominately Christian district of Ankawa and he met Kurdistan president Masoud Barzani.

=== Saudi Arabia ===
The LF is widely regarded as Saudi Arabia's main ally in Lebanon after Saad Hariri's retirement from Lebanese politics. This alignment stems from shared interests in countering Hezbollah's influence and Iranian presence in the country. In September 2017, Saudi Crown Prince Mohammed bin Salman met with Geagea in Jeddah and allegedly spoke about "common concerns". A 2015 leak of documents from Saudi Arabia's Foreign Affairs Ministry revealed that Geagea had asked for money to pay for bodyguards and boasted of his "preparedness to do whatever the kingdom asks of him."

=== Syria ===
Geagea has always been a staunch critic of the Assad regimes's involvement in Lebanese politics. In December 2024, the fall of Assad’s Baathist regime in Syria was a subject of celebration among Geagea’s supporters. Geagea said in an interview: "No matter how the situation in Syria will be after Assad, it’s impossible that it will be worse than Assad."
