= Maronite Catholic Archeparchy of Aleppo =

Eastern Catholic archeparchy in Syria

Coordinates: 36.2071°N 37.1557°E

Archeparchy of Aleppo Archeparchy Aleppensis Maronitarum
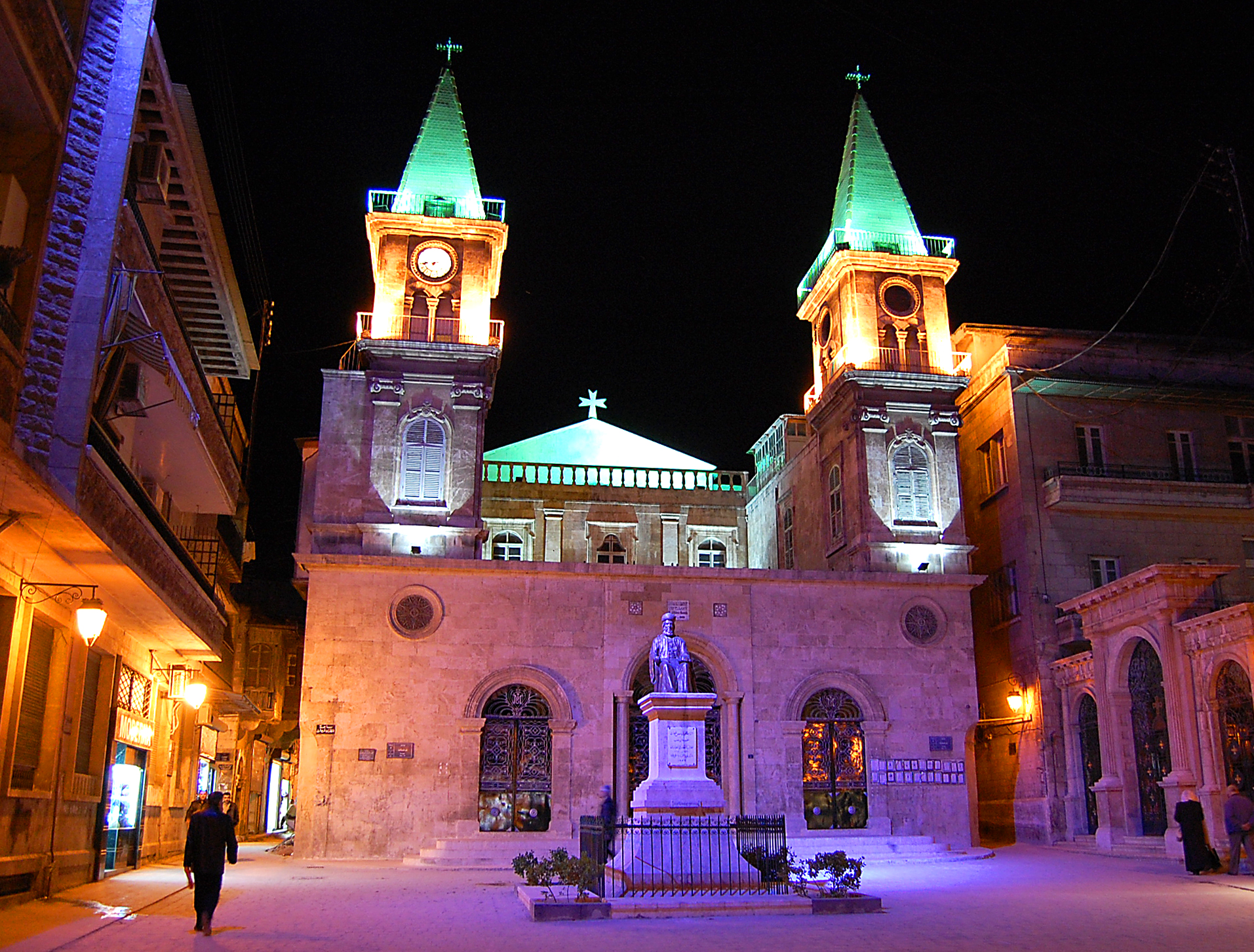

Location
- Country: Syria

Statistics
- Population: (as of 2012); 4,000
- Parishes: 5

Information
- Denomination: Catholic Church
- Sui iuris church: Maronite Church
- Rite: West Syro-Antiochene Rite
- Established: 17th century
- Cathedral: Saint Elias Cathedral

Current leadership
- Pope: Leo XIV
- Patriarch: Bechara Boutros al-Rahi
- Archeparch: Joseph Tobji
- Bishops emeritus: Youssef Anis Abi-Aad

The Archeparchy of Aleppo of the Maronites (in Latin: Archeparchy Aleppensis Maronitarum) is a seat of the Maronite Church. The archeparchy's current ordinary is Archeparch Joseph Tobji.

== Territory and statistics ==
The archeparchy includes the city and the region of Aleppo, where is located the Saint Elias Cathedral.

The territory is divided into five parishes and in 2012 there were 4,000 Maronite Catholics.

== History ==
The first mention of the presence of Maronites in the city of Aleppo is contained in the Chronicle of Michael the Syrian, which relates events of the first half of the eighth century, after which the Maronites were expelled from the city. The Maronite presence was reduced to so few units. Only in the seventeenth century, thanks to immigration, the Aleppinian Maronite community grew and was equipped with a bishopric, although they are unsure whether the names of the first prelates in the history.

In 1675 surveyed about 1,500 Maronites, while ten years later their number is about 4,000. The Maronite clergy was mostly ignorant and without any training. Capuchins, Carmelites and Jesuits preached in Maronite churches as missionaries due to the lack of priests.

Among the former bishops is certainly the best known Gabriel of Blaouza, who was elected patriarch of the Maronite Church in 1704 succeeding Estephan El Douaihy; he is linked to the foundation of Antonin Maronite Order. Germanos Farhat, a man of culture and scholar of Arabic, was the first bishop born in Aleppo and probably the first to reside permanently in the city.

During the episcopate of Paul Aroutin, the Maronite Church obtained the civil recognition by Ottoman Empire (1831), which allowed the bishop to restore the ancient cathedral of Saint Elias, already attested in the seventeenth century. It must to his successor Youssef Matar construction of today's cathedral: the bishop himself took part in the First Vatican Council and established in 1857 the Imprimerie de la nation Maronite, the first authentic typography in the city of Aleppo.

From 1954 to 1977 the bishops of Aleppo were also directors of Patriarchal administration of Laodicea (today Maronite Catholic Eparchy of Laodicea).

== Archbishops ==
- Elias' Ehdeni (1638–1659)
- Andraos Akhijan Abed Al Ghal (mentioned in 1661)
- Joseph Hasrouni (? – 1663 deceased)
- Gabriel of Blaouza, OAM (1663 – 12 May 1704 elected patriarch of Antioch)
- Michel al-Blawzawi (July 1704 consecrated – 1724 resigned)
- Germanos (Gabriel) Farhat (29 July 1725 consecrated – 9 July 1732 deceased)
- Germanos (Gabriel) Hawacheb (1732 consecrated – 1762)
- Arsène Choukri (1762–1787)
- Gabriel Konaider (30 September 1787 consecrated – 15 June 1802 deceased)
- Germanos Hawa (1804–1827)
- Paul Aroutin (3 May 1829 consecrated – 21 April 1851 deceased)
- Youssef Matar (28 September 1851 consecrated – 14 May 1882 deceased)
- Paul Hakim (16 July 1885 consecrated – 25 February 1888 deceased)
- Germanos Chemali (1892–1895)
- Youssef Debs (Diab) (22 March 1896 – 1912 deceased)
- Michael Äkras (24 February 1913 – 27 October 1945 deceased)
- Ignace Ziadé (27 April 1946 – 26 January 1952 appointed archeparch of Beirut)
- François Ayoub (16 April 1954 – 2 June 1966 deceased)
- Joseph Salamé (15 March 1967 – 9 June 1990 withdrawn)
- Pierre Callaos (9 June 1990 – 16 March 1997 deceased)
- Youssef Anis Abi-Aad, IdP, (7 June 1997 – 11 November 2013 resign)
- Joseph Tobji (since 31 October 2015)

== See also ==
- Maronite Catholic Eparchy of Latakia
- Maronite Catholic Archeparchy of Damascus

== Sources ==
- Joseph Feghali, Germanos Farhat, archevêque et d'Alep arabisant 1670–1732, in Parole de l'Orient, vol. 2, No. 1 (1966), pp. 115–129.
- C. Karalevsky, v. Alep, in Dictionnaire d'Histoire et de Géographie ecclésiastiques, vol. XII, Paris 1953, coll. 108–110 and 114.
- Pontificio Annuario, Libreria Editrice Vaticana, Città del Vaticano, 2003, ISBN 88-209-7422-3.
