= Patriarch Gabriel II =

Patriarch Gabriel II may refer to:

- Gabriel II of Constantinople, Ecumenical Patriarch in 1657
- Gabriel of Blaouza, Maronite Patriarch in 1704–1705
