= 7th century in Lebanon =

- Key event(s)
- Sassanid occupation, Islamic Fatḥ, (Note: Arabic: فَتْحٌ; Islamic victory, invasion or occupation. Lit.: to open/ opening) Mardaite raids, establishment of the Maronite Patriarchate
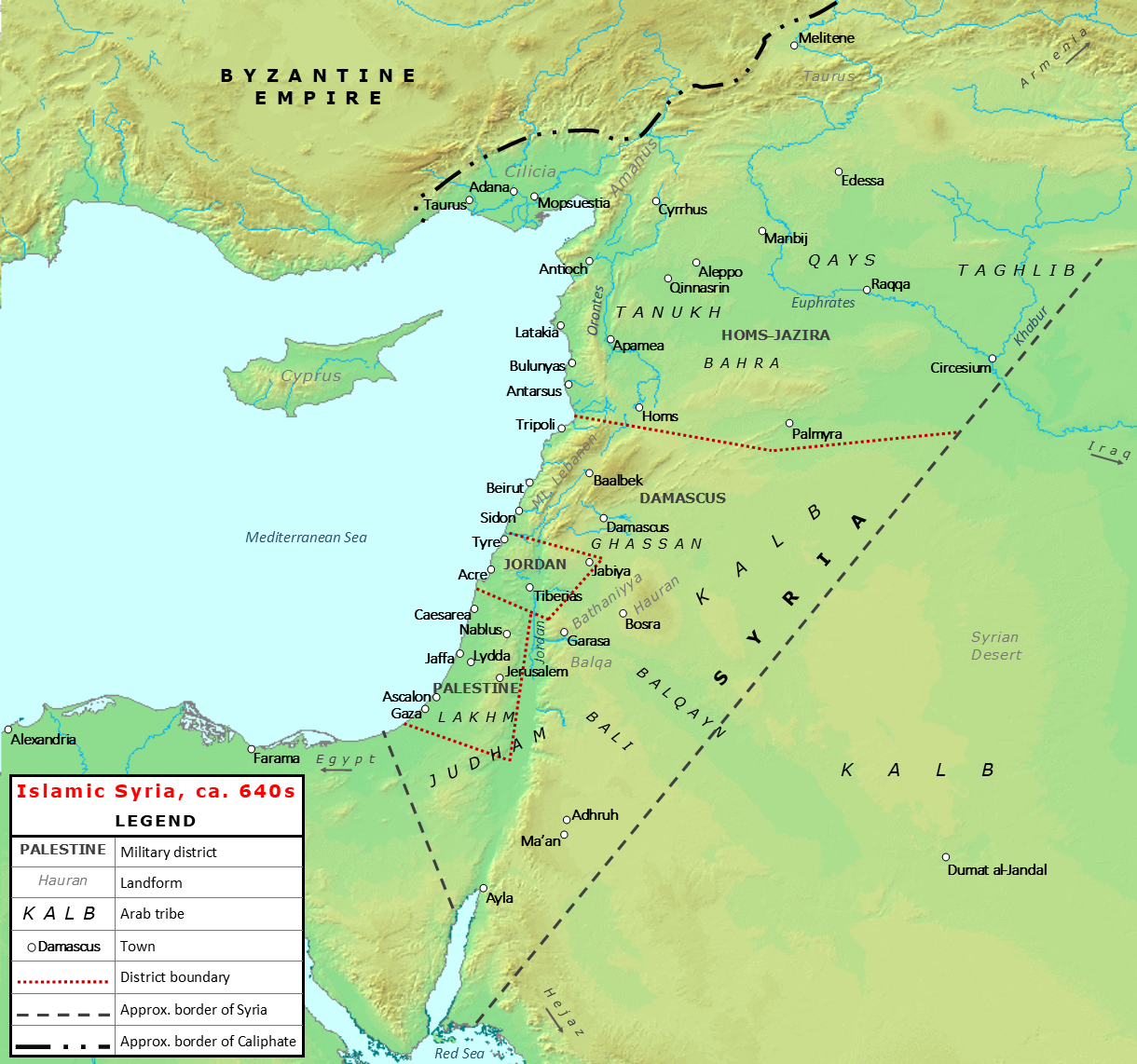
- Map of the Levant during early Islamic rule.
- Chronology
- ← 6th century; 7th century; 8th century →

This article lists historical events that occurred between 601–700 in modern-day Lebanon or regarding its people.

== Administration ==
=== Jewish expedition to Tyre ===
According to Eutychius, under the reign of Heraclius, the Jews launched an expedition against Tyre. Bands of Jews from Jerusalem, Tiberias, Galilee, Damascus, and even from Cyprus, united and undertook an incursion against Tyre, having been invited by the 4,000 Jewish inhabitants of that city to surprise and massacre the Christians on Easter night. The Jewish army is said to have consisted of 20,000 men. The expedition, however, miscarried, as the Christians of Tyre learned of the impending danger, and seized the 4,000 Tyrian Jews as hostages. The Jewish invaders destroyed the churches around Tyre, an act which the Christians avenged by killing two thousand of their Jewish prisoners. The besiegers, to save the remaining prisoners, withdrew, having had to suffer the humiliation of watching the heads of the Jewish captives as they were thrown over the walls.

=== Byzantine-Sassanian War and its aftermath ===
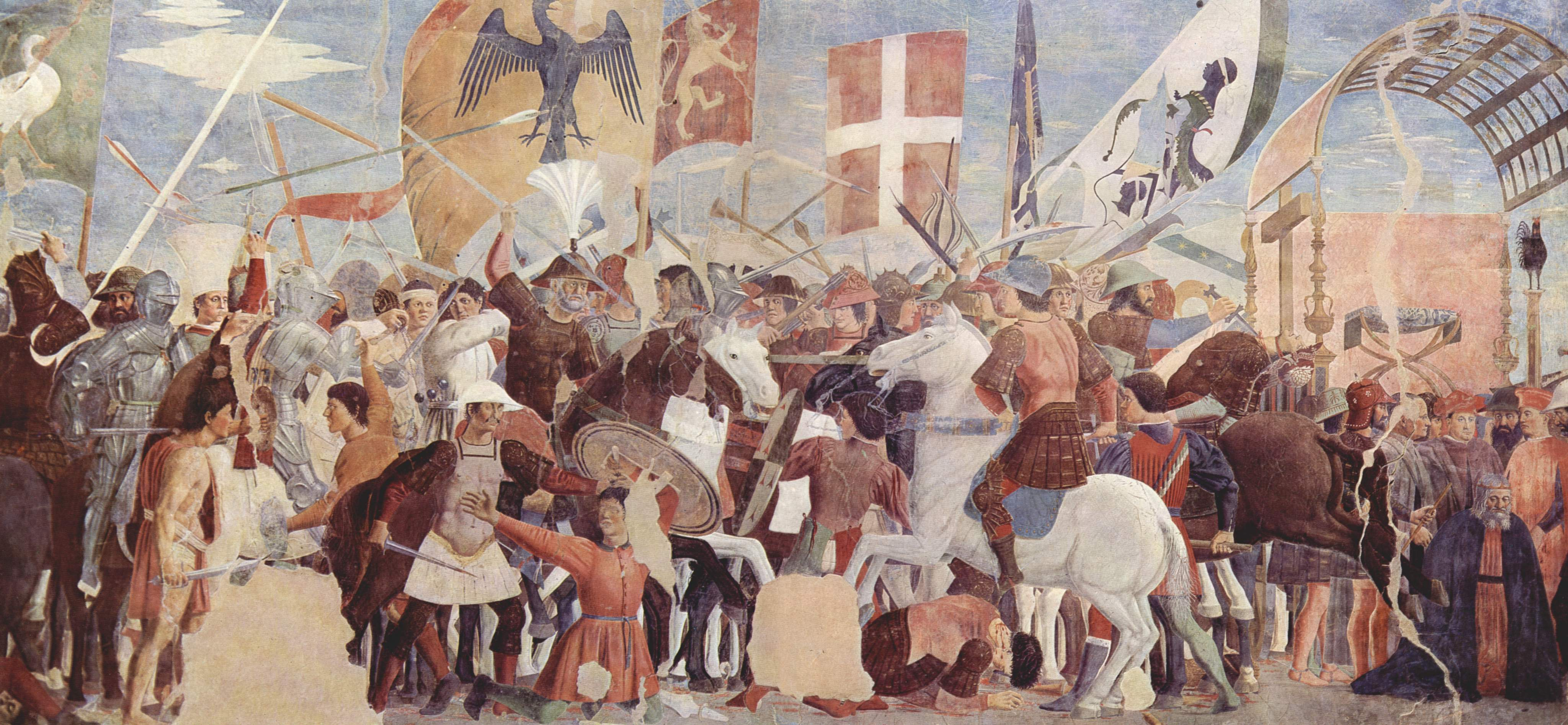
Painting of the last Byzantine-Sassanian War.

During the frequent Roman–Persian Wars that lasted for many centuries, the Sassanid Persians occupied what is now Lebanon from 619 to 629. Shortly after the Byzantine victory in the war and the recovery of the region, it was again lost, this time permanently, to the Muslim conquests: by the 640s, the Muslim Arabs conquered Syria soon after the death of the Islamic prophet Muhammad, establishing a new regime to replace the Romans. The Maronite community clung to its religion and managed to maintain a large degree of autonomy despite the succession of rulers over the Levant.

=== Islamic rule ===
When he [Salman the Persian] reached Beirut [his frontier], he said, "O people of Beirut, shall I tell you something that will lighten the burden of guarding the frontier? I heard the Messenger of Allah (peace and blessings be upon him) say, 'Guarding the frontier for a day and a night is like fasting and praying for a whole month. Whoever dies while stationed on the frontier will be protected from the trial of the grave, and his good deeds will continue to be recorded until the Day of Judgment.'

— Al-Qāsim Abū ‘Abdur-rahmān, Siyar A'lam al-Nubala'

The conquest of Lebanon during the Arab and Islamic conquests was linked to the conquest of Bilād Al-Shām as a whole, or what is known as the Levant, being an integral part of it, the Arab Muslims swiftly took it from the Byzantine Empire during the era of Caliph Umar Ibn Al-Khattab, who ordered the division of the Levant when he conquered it, into four Ajnād, including the Jund Dimashq which includes Mount Lebanon with its corresponding western coastal plains and the eastern interior plains. Yazid ibn Abi Sufyan was at the forefront of the Islamic army, which headed to Lebanon with Yazid's half-brother, Muawiyah. He marched to Sidon, Beirut, and Jbeil, while Khalid bin Al-Walid entered the Bekaa region reaching Baalbek.

As for Tripoli, it was conquered for the first time in a separate conquest by the commander Yūqannā in the year 18 AH (639/640 AD), then the Byzantine Empire reoccupied some of its coast at the end of the Caliphate of Umar Ibn Al-Khattab or the beginning of the caliphate of Uthman Ibn Affan. When Uthman appointed Muawiyah over the Levant, Muawiyah sent Sufyan bin Mujib al-Azdi to Tripoli to restore it, and it was three cities combined, so he built in Al-Marj ("the meadow"), miles from it, a fortress called "Sufyan's fort", and he used to stay in his fortress every night and fortify the Muslims there, then go to the enemy in the morning. He besieged Tripoli and cut off the supply of its people from the sea and land. Ibn Asaker adds in his "History of Damascus" details that confirm the story, which he transmitted with his chain of transmission on the authority of Abu Muti' Mu'awiyah bin Yahya al-Tarabulsi (Note: Al-Tarābulsi meaning "The Tripolitan") (died after 170 AH, 786/787 AD) on the authority of a Sheikh from Tripoli that Sufyan bin Mujib camped with his great army in Marj al-Silsilah (Beddawi), which is five miles from Tripoli. At the origin of Mount Terbol, he used to walk to Tripoli to besiege it and then return to his camp in Al-Beddawi, and he continued on that for months until Muawiyah wrote to him ordering him to build for him and his companions a fortress that would shelter him by night and besiege them by day. As a result, Sufyan built a fortress two miles from Tripoli, which is called "Sufyan's Fort."

On the basis of this historical text of Abu Al-Muti' al-Tarabulsi, the historian Omar Tadmouri said that the Sufyan fortress is now located at the now-known Tripoli Citadel. The castle is two miles away from old Tripoli (El Mina), or 3200 meters. When the siege intensified upon them, they gathered in one of the city's fortresses and wrote to the Roman Emperor Constans II asking him to supply them or to send them boats to escape to. Subsequently, the emperor sent numerous boats to them, so they boarded them at night and fled. When Sufyan became aware, he found the fortress in which they were empty, so he entered it, and wrote the news of the conquest to Muawiyah. Then Abd al-Malik re-built it afterwards and fortified it (in modern El Mina).

However, with the exodus of the Islamic Arab tribes to the coastal areas and the border areas within the framework of the conquest, the Christians of Lebanon began to gather in the fortified mountainous areas along the coast. Subsequently, from time to time, they used to communicate with the Byzantines, who took a spearhead from them to attack the Muslims since the days of the Umayyad Caliph Muawiyah bin Abi Sufyan, taking advantage of his preoccupation with the events that accompanied his disagreement with Ali bin Abi Talib. The christian anti-islamic rebellion reached its climax during the reign of Abdul Malik bin Marwan during the events that culminated in the Hijaz and Iraq against the background of the revolution launched by Abdullah bin Al-Zubayr, So Abd al-Malik had to stop resisting the Mardaites and had to pay their leaders tributes in the form of dinars.

=== Lebanese towns and cities ===
Other principal towns and cities of the Jund Dimashq were Beirut, Sidon, Tyre (the tax proceeds of which went to Jund al-Urdunn), Tripoli and Byblos along the coast. The coastal cities and their immediate surroundings formed their own small districts.

As of the administrative system approved by the Caliphate for the city of Tripoli, the Umayyads adopted an administrative system for the Lebanese cities which stipulates the presence of a governor for each city, and these governors were directly subordinate to the caliph in Damascus. However, the coastal cities such as Tripoli, Beirut and Tyre enjoyed the presence of a city 'āmil (administrator) and an amīr for the sea.

== Events ==
=== 600s ===
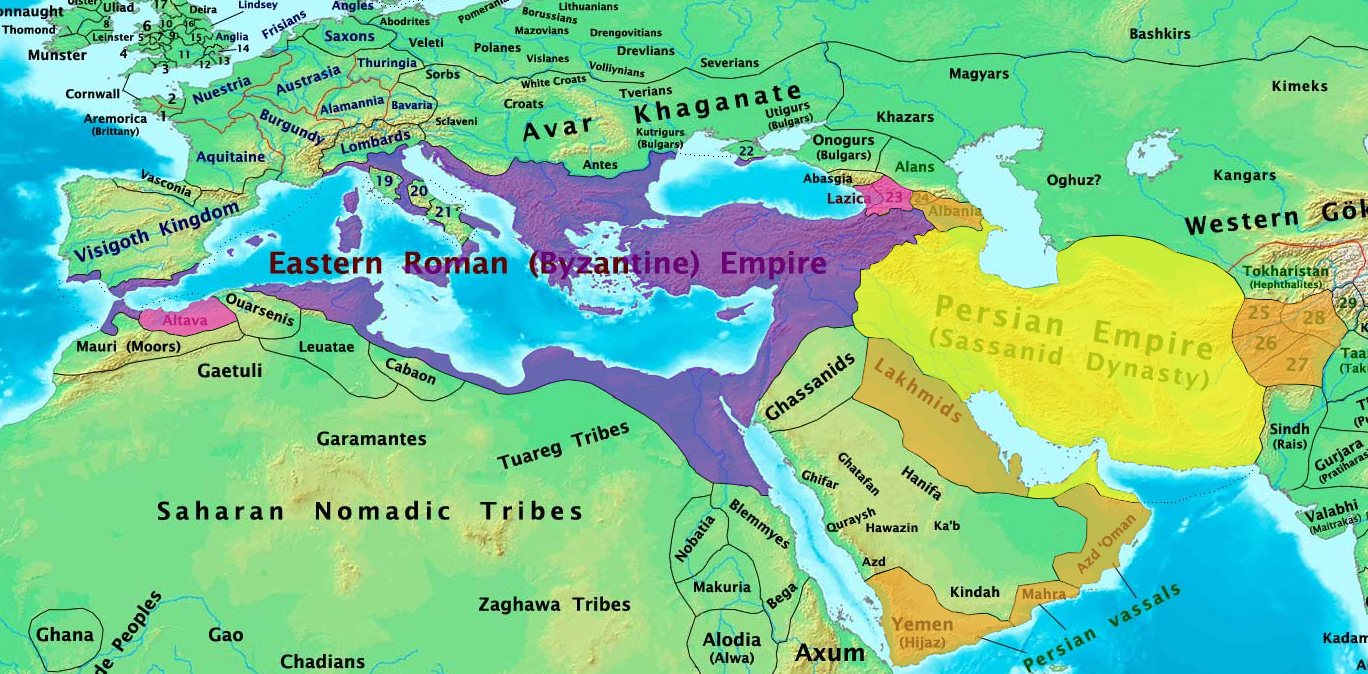
Map of the Byzantine and Sassanid empire in 600 AD.

- Start of the Byzantine-Sasanian war in 602 AD.
- The Patriarch of Antioch, Anastasius II is martyred in 609, leaving the Maronites without a leader. With the ongoing Byzantine–Sasanian War and general unrest in the area, Constantinople began to appoint a series of titular patriarchs; which leads to the appointment of the first Maronite Patriarch.

=== 610s ===
- The Jews of Tyre launch a Jewish revolt against Heraclius, 610 AD.
- Beginning of the Sassanid occupation of Lebanon, 619 AD.

=== 620s ===
- The Byzantine–Sassanian Wars end in 628 AD.
- The Emperor Heraclius personally visits the monastery of Deir Maroun in 628, prior to his proclamation of his Monothelitism.
- End of the Sassanid occupation of Lebanon, 629.

=== 630s ===
Calligraphic representation of Abu Bakr

- Caliph Abu Bakr introduces Islam to the area around Lebanon, from 632 to 634 AD.
- Baalbek sends two thousand soldiers to support Huwwarin when Khalid Ibn Al-Walid attacked it in the year 13 AH / 634 AD.
- In 634 AD, soon after the appointment of Abu-Ubaidah as commander in chief of the Rashidun army, he sends a small detachment to the annual fair held at Abu-al-Quds, modern day Ablah, near Zahlé 50 kilometres (31 miles) east of Beirut.
- Beirut passes into Arab control in 635 AD.
- Khalid walks to Baalbek on the Zabadani road. At the same time, Heraclius sends to the army of Baalbek ordering it to march to Bisan to support the Byzantines there. When Khalid approached the outskirts of Baalbek, he learned that the Roman army had left the city, so he took with him the sheep and cows that he found on his way and returned to Abu Ubaidah, who lives in front of the walls of Damascus. Khalid did not enter Baalbek nor did he besiege it. This was done in the month of Dhul-Qi'dah, 13 AH, January 635 AD.
- After the Battle of Yarmouk, Caliph Umar appoints Muawiyah I, founder of the Umayyad dynasty, as ruler of Jund Dimashq, an area that included Lebanon at that time, 636 AD.
- In 639, Tripoli is finally invaded by the Rashidun Caliphate.

=== 640s ===
- In the late 640s, the Rashidun caliph's governor Muawiyah, launches his naval invasions of Cyprus from Tyre.

=== 650s ===
- In June 659, the bishops of the Jacobites — Theodore and Sabukht — comes to Damascus and holds an inquiry into the Faith with the Maronites in the presence of Mu'awiya.

=== 660s ===
- Shabib bin Amer, the pro-Alid governor of Upper Mesopotamia, reaches Baalbek with his anti-Umayyad attacks in the year 39 AH - 660 AD.
- the Hasan–Muawiya treaty is signed in 661 CE, which leads to the spread of Shi'ism among segments of the local populations living among them in Jabal Amel, Beqaa valley, Tyre and Tripoli,
- The Maronite Chronicle, an anonymous annalistic chronicle in the Syriac language, is completed shortly after 664.
- The Maronite belief is defined in the year 667 AD as the existence of two natures in Christ, with him having one will for the two natures to meet in one hypostasis.
- Muawiyah negotiates an agreement with Constantine IV, the Byzantine emperor, agreeing to pay an annual tribute to Constantine in exchange for stopping the Mardaite massacres and raids of the muslim inhabitants, 667 AD.

=== 670s ===
- Greek fire proper, is developed in c. 672 and is ascribed by the chronicler Theophanes the Confessor to Kallinikos (Latinized Callinicus), an architect from Heliopolis (Baalbek) in the former province of Phoenice, by then overrun by the Muslim conquests.
- According to Theophanes the confessor: "In this year [676 or 677 CE], the Mardaites penetrated into the range of Lebanon and made themselves masters of the Black Mountain up to the holy city and seized the heights of Lebanon. Many slaves, captives and natives fled to their homes, so that in a short time there were many thousands. When Mauias [Muawiya] and his advisers heard of this, they were very afraid..."

=== 680s ===
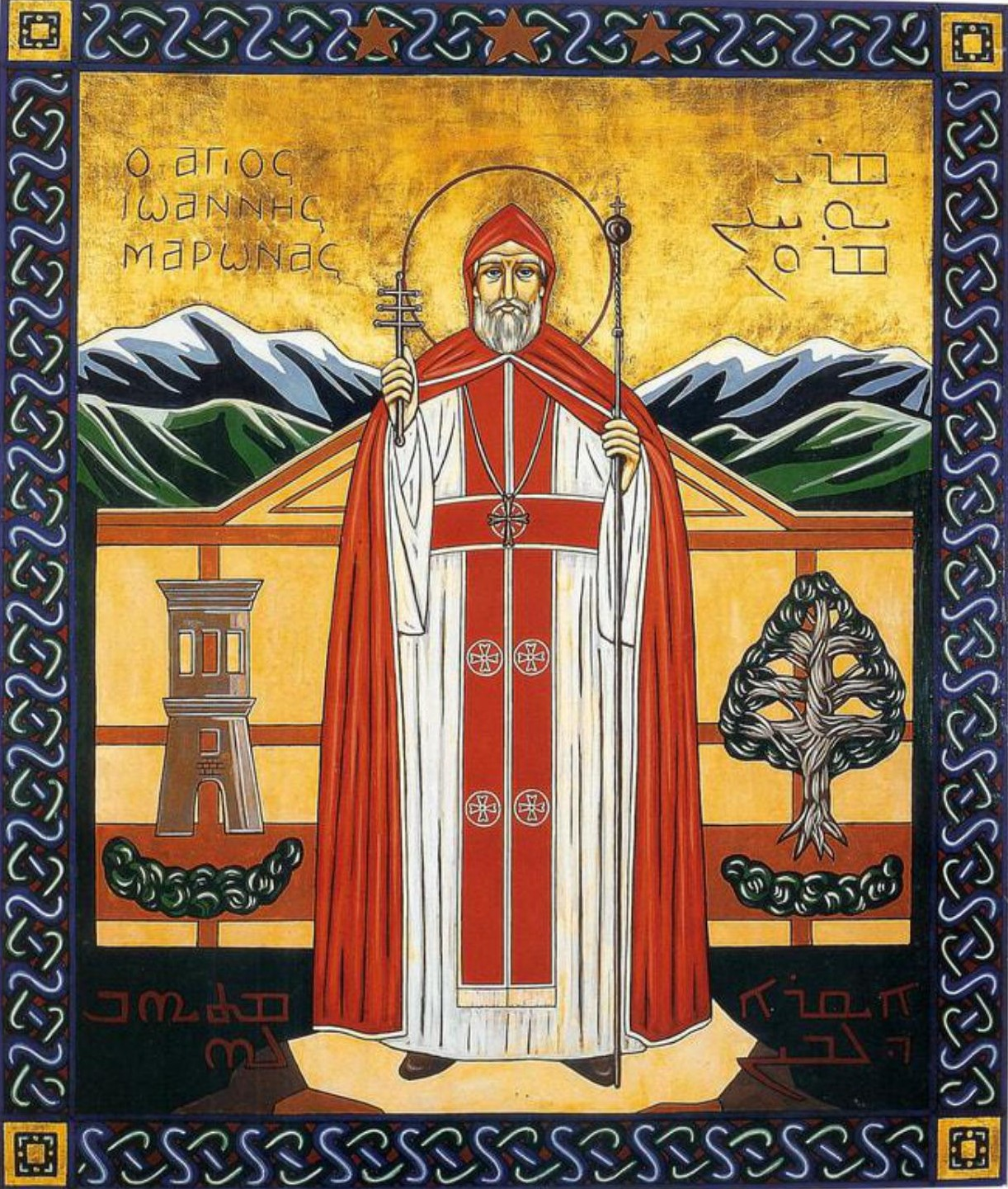
Icon of John Maron

- John Maron gets elected as the first Maronite Patriarch of Antioch and All the East in 685 with the approval of Pope Sergius I.
- In 685, the Byzantine emperor, Constantine IV, leads his army to Mopsuestia in Cilicia, and prepares to cross the border into Syria, where the Mardaites, an indigenous Christian group, were already causing considerable trouble. With Abd al-Malik own position insecure, he concluded a treaty whereby he would pay a tribute of 1,000 gold coins, a horse and a slave for every day of the year.
- In 687, as part of an agreements with Abd al-Malik ibn Marwan, Byzantine emperor Justinian II sends 12,000 Christian Maronites from Lebanon to Armenia.
- Emperor Justinian II sends the Mardaites again to raid Syria in 688/9; this time they were joined by native peasants and slaves and were able to advance as far as Lebanon.

=== 690s ===
- The Maronites separate from the pro-Byzantine Melkites, Council in Trullo (692 AD).
- In 694, at the battle of Amioun, Justinian sends troops against the Maronites in an unsuccessful attempt to capture their Patriarch.
- Byzantine-Maronite relations improve with the reign of the Byzantine Emperor Tiberius, according to Doueihi, the Maronites led by Simon, a Mountain Prince, joined the Byzantine forces to defeat the Arabs in 699. Doueihi states that :"As a token of gratitude, the Byzantine Emperor sent Patriarch John Maroun a royal flower along with a letter thanking his holiness and his brave followers".

== People ==
=== Births and deaths ===
- Germanus, dux of Pheonice Libanensis, dies in 604 AD.
- John Maron is born in 628 AD, Sirmaniyah or Sarmin, present Syria.
- Sisinnius, future Roman Catholic pope, is born in Tyre (modern-day Lebanon), c. 650.
- Constantine, future Roman Catholic pope is born in Tyre, Lebanon, 664 AD.

=== Ṣaḥābah who have visited Lebanon ===
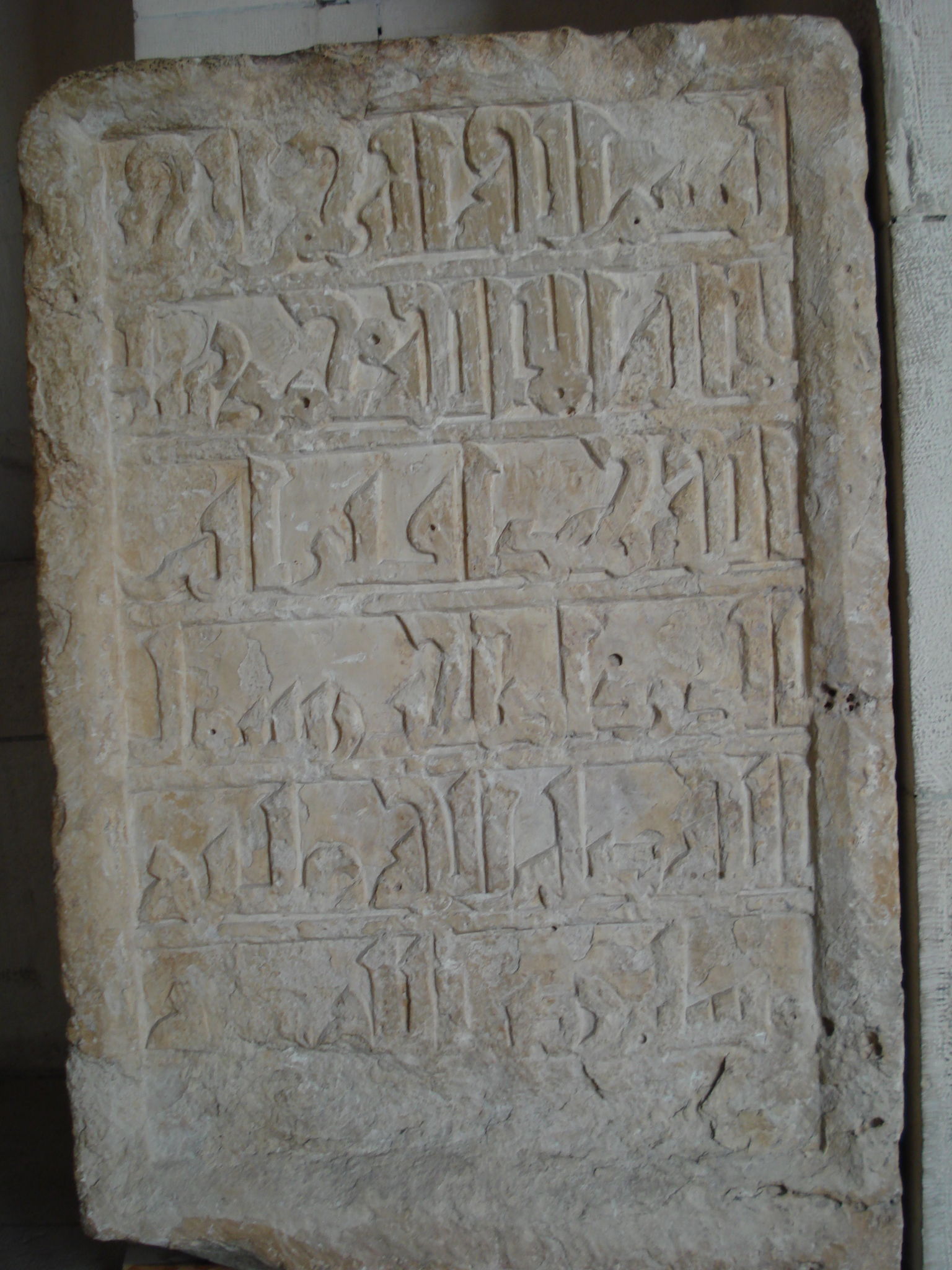
Tombstone of Abu Dardā'

- Abu al-Darda', (invaded Cyprus in the year 28 AH (648/649 AD), stayed in Marj al-Silsilah (in North Lebanon) and Beirut shortly after its conquest).

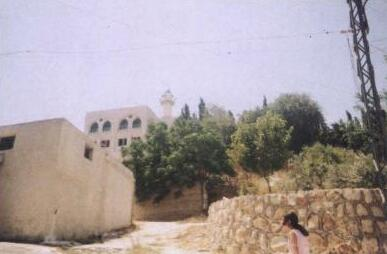
A mosque attributed to Abu Dharr al-Ghifari in Mays al-Jabal in southern Lebanon

- Abu Dhar al-Ghifari (Marj al-Silsilah, Cyprus, and perhaps Sarafand, his son stayed in Beirut).
- Abu Zaid bin Waraqah bin Amer Al-Zubaidi (set his foot on Baalbek, he participated in the siege of Harbīs in the village).
- Abu Sabrah bin Abi Ruhm Al-Qurashi (occupied Deir Abi Al-Adas, Marj Al-Silsilah).

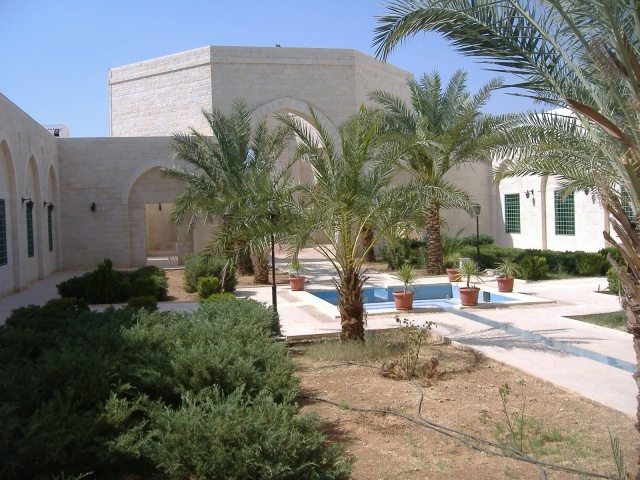
The tomb of Abu Ubayda in Deir Alla, Jordan

- Abu Ubaidah bin Al-Jarrah (invaded several regions of Al-Sham such as Baalbek, Al-Labwah, and set his foot in Marj Al-Silsilah).

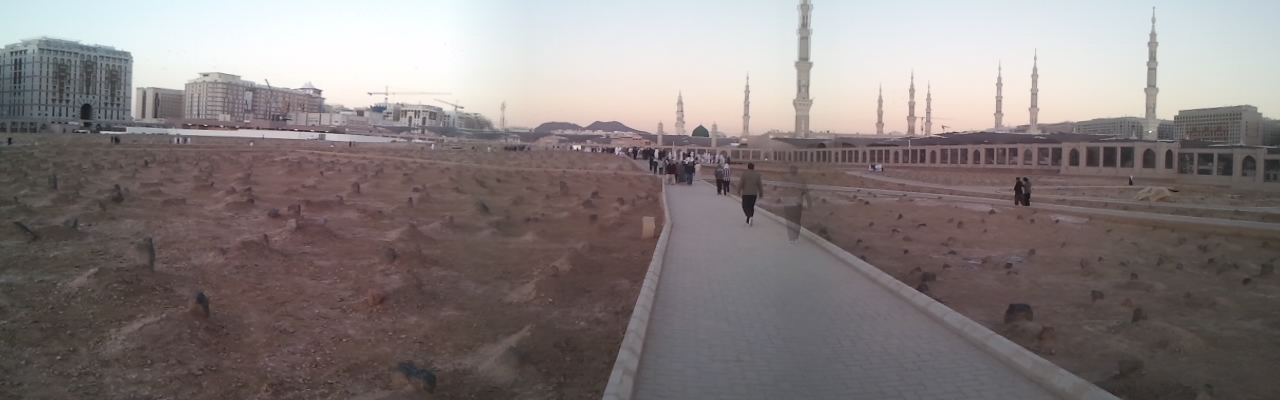
Al Baqi cemetery, the place where Abu Hurairah was buried

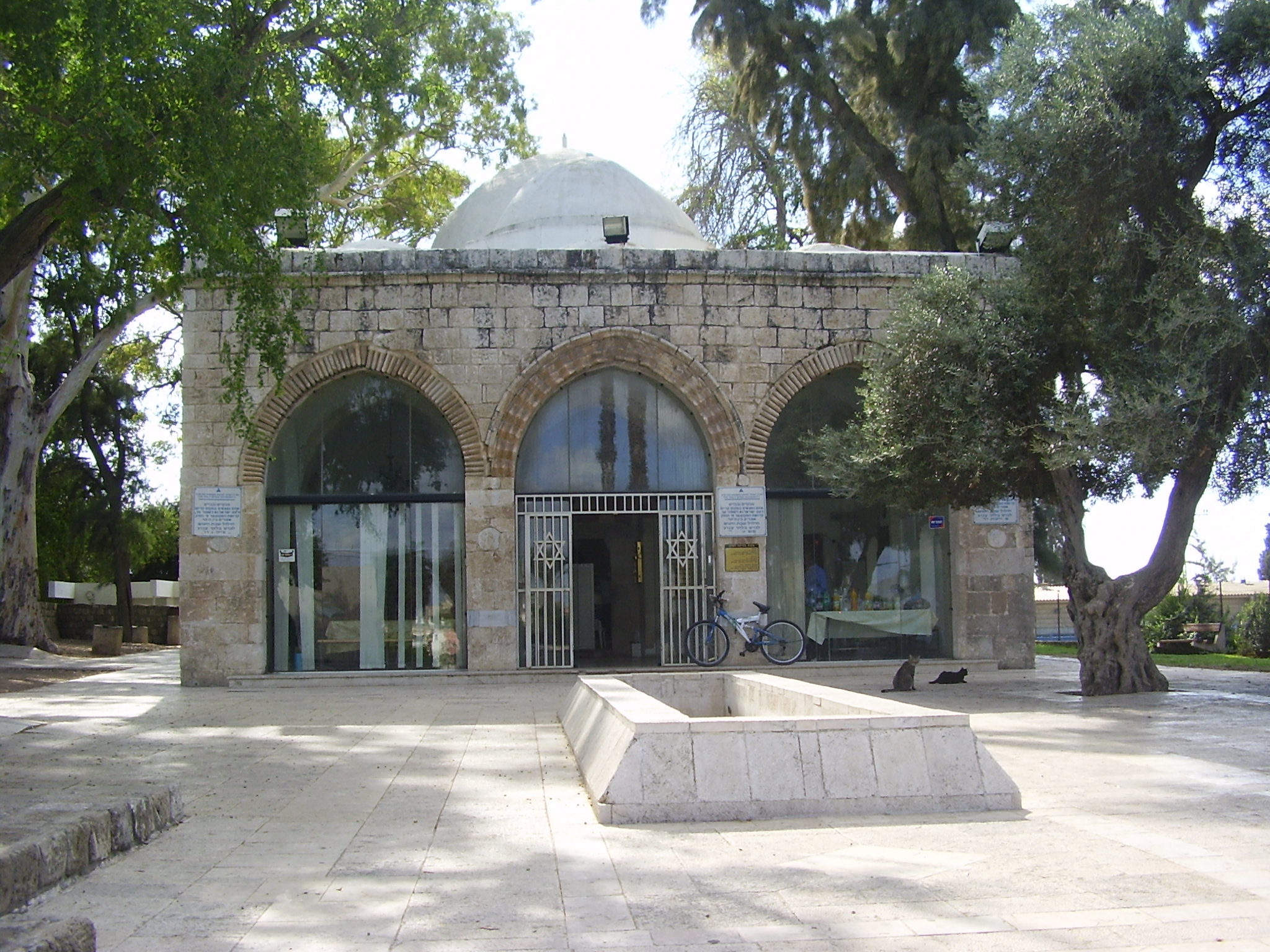
The Mausoleum of Abu Huraira in 2010

- Abu Huraira (in Marj al-Silsilah).
- Al-Hajjaj bin Abdullah Al-Thumali (was mentioned on the authority of Sufyan bin Mujib Al-Azdi, and the people of Lebanon narrated about him).
- Al-Sa'ib bin Yazid (Invaded Marj Al-Silsilah).
- Al-Dahhak bin Qais bin Khalid (Abu Bakr joined him with the conquests of al-Sham with Yazid bin Abi Sufyan).

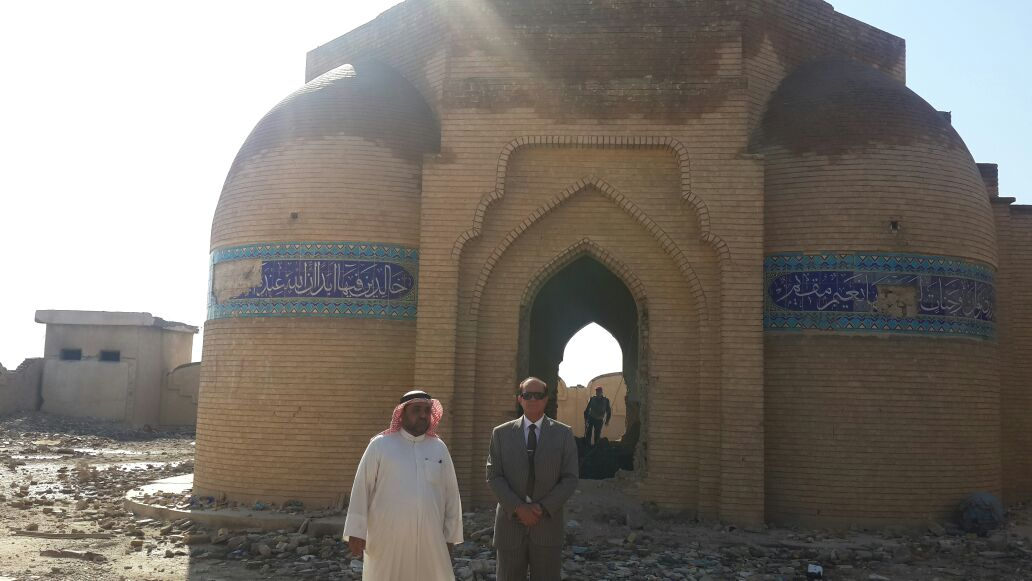
Tomb of Anas ibn Malik

- Anas bin Malik, last major companion of the Prophet to die (stayed in Marj al-Silsilah).
- Busr bin Artah (the owner of the ships in Dhāt al-Ṣawārī, he invaded the sea repeatedly).
- Tha'laba bin Obaid (husband of the sister of Jabal; Al-Sa'abah, Baalbek).
- Habis ibn Sa'd al-Ta'i (Baalbek).
- Habib bin Maslama al-Fihri (Baalbek).

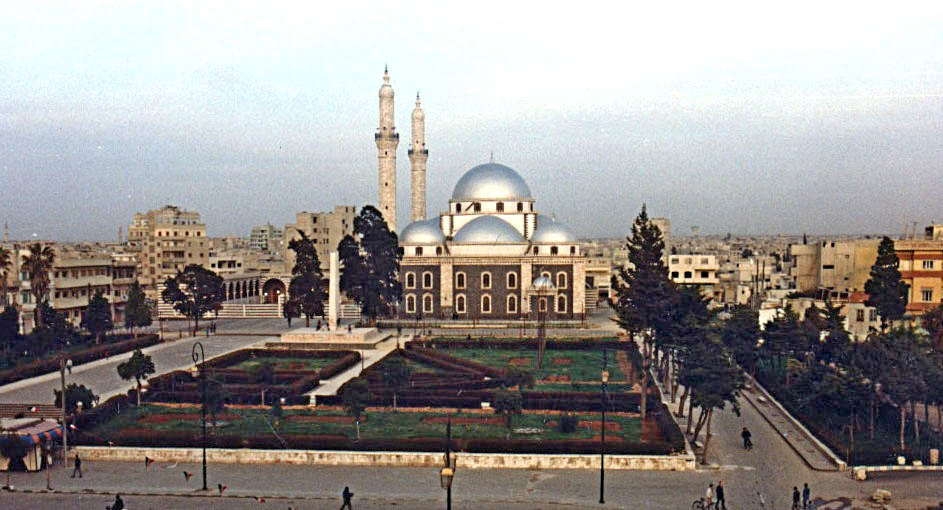
Since at least the 12th century, Khalid's tomb has been purported to be located in the present-day Khalid ibn al-Walid Mosque in Homs, Syria

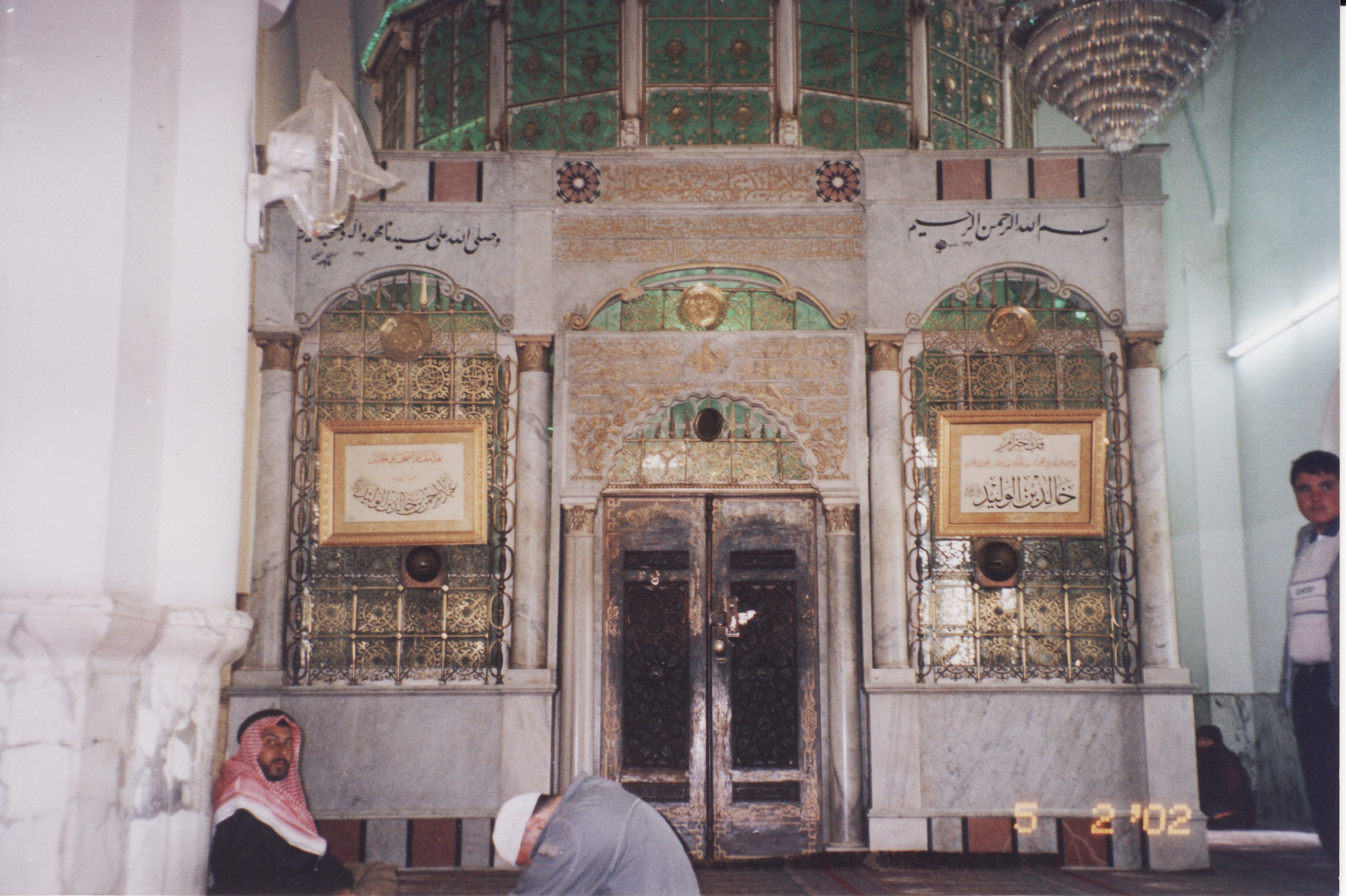
The purported tomb of Khalid within the Khalid ibn al-Walid Mosque

- Khaled bin Al-Walid (Beqaa, Baalbek, Marj Al-Silsila, Tripoli and Wadi Khaled).
- Rafi' bin Abi Rafi' al-Ta'i, and it is said that he is the son of Umairah.
- Rabia bin Amer bin Bijad (participated in the conquest of Baalbek).
- Saeed bin Zaid (one of the ten to whom Paradise was promised) (Participated in the invasion of Baalbek and Damascus).
- Said ibn Amir Al-Jumahi (Participated in the conquest of Baalbek).
- Sufyan bin Mujib Al-Azdi (Second conqueror of Tripoli, founder of its castle and ruler of Baalbek), died in Baalbek, 670 AD/50 AH.

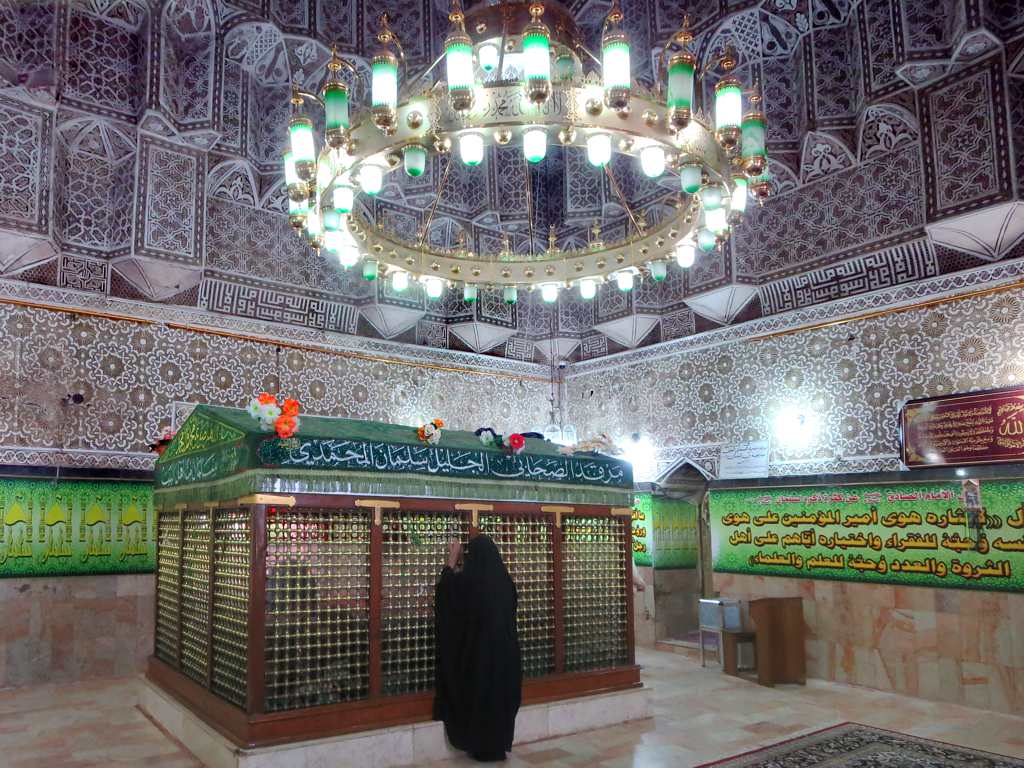
Tomb of Salmān Al-Farsi.

- Salman Al Farsi (stayed in Beirut).
- Sahl bin Saad Al-Saadi (participated in the invasion of Marj Al-Silsilah).
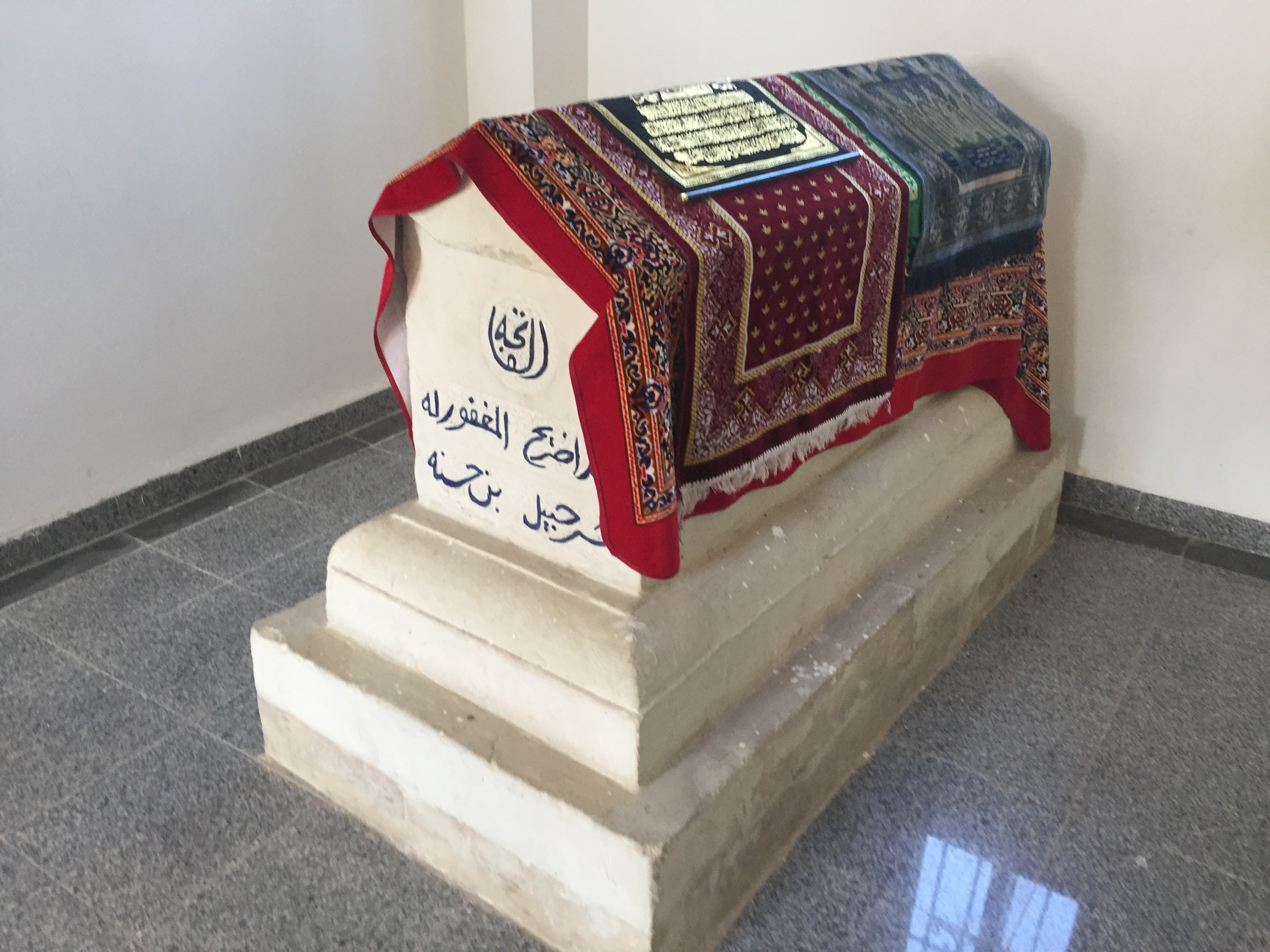
  Shrine of Shurahbil ibn Hasana, Jordan
- Sharhabil ibn Hasana (conqueror of Tyre, stayed in Tripoli, and was buried in Sidon).
- Safwan bin Al-Mu'attal (Participated in the invasion of Baalbek).
- Dhiraar ibn al-Azwar al-Asadi (invaded Baalbek and Marj al-Silsilah, he killed a Patriarch).
- 'Amer bin Rabī'ah (conquered Marj Al-Silsilah).

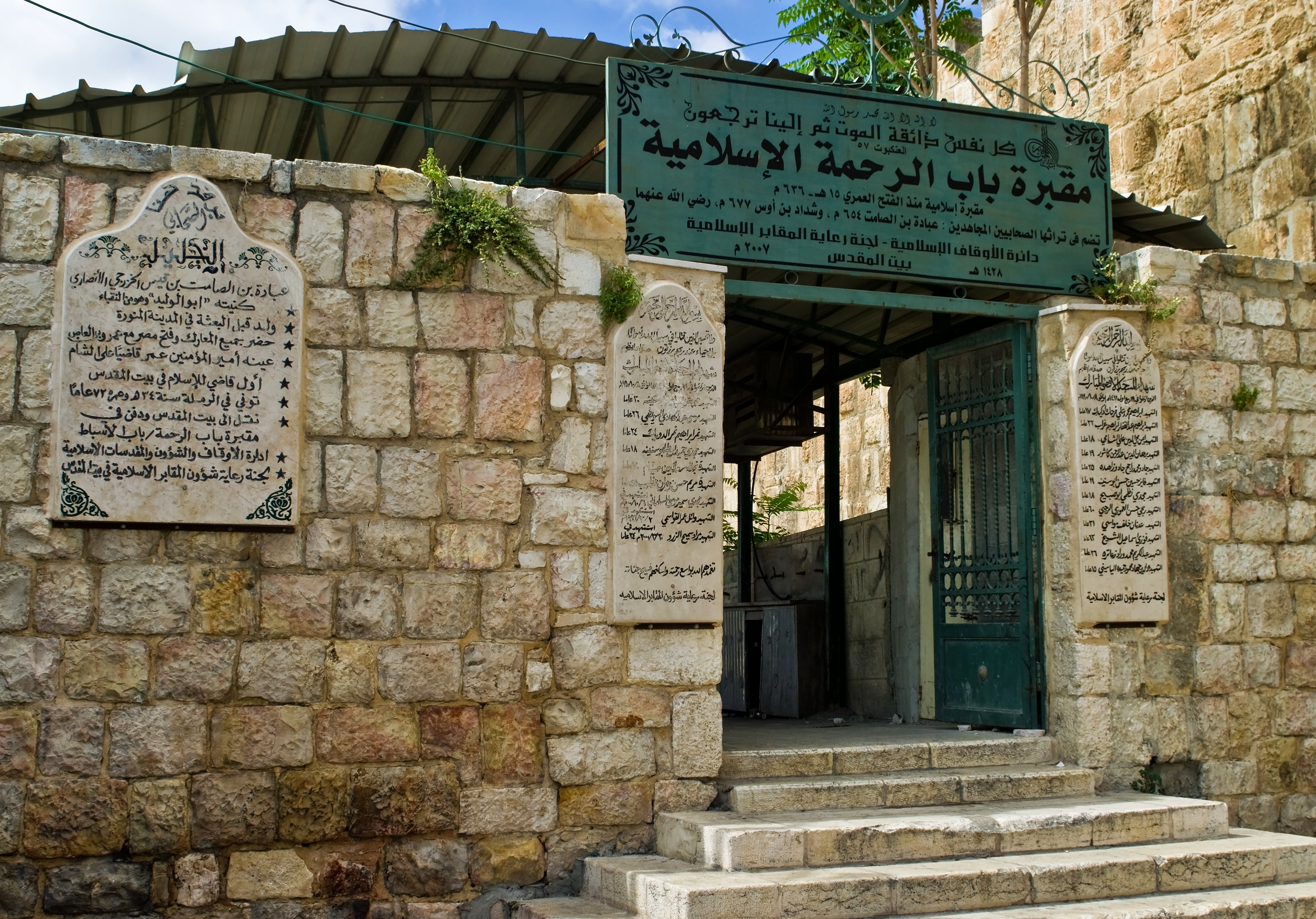
Place of the remains of the Sahābiy Ubadah ibn-Samit, Bab al-Asbat Cemetery, Quds Governorate

- Ubadah ibn al-Samit.
- Abd al-Rahman ibn Abi Bakr al-Siddiq (Baalbek).
- Abd al-Rahman ibn Udays al-Balawi (killed near Baalbek).
- Abdullah bin Abi Awfa (occupied Marj al-Silsilah).
- Abdullah bin Unais (the conqueror of Marj al-Silsilah).
- Abdullah bin Busr Al-Mazini (invaded Marj Al-Silsilah).
- Abdullah bin Tha'labah bin Sa'ir (invaded Marj al-Silsilah).
- Abdullah bin Jaafar Al-Tayyar (invaded Marj Al-Silsila and Al-Beddewi).
- Abdullah bin Qurt Al-Thamali Al-Azdi (Baalbek).
- Abdullah bin Masoud (stayed in Marj al-Silsilah for 3 days).
- Utbah bin Abd: Abu Al-Walid Al-Salami (conquered Al-Silsilah).
- Ata bin Omar Al-Khathami; military advisor, (Baalbek).

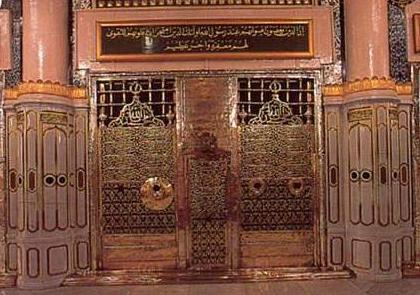
Tombstone of caliph Umar, in the Green Dome in al-Masjid al-Nabawi, Medina. The first window from the right gives a view of Umar's grave.

- Umar Ibn Al-Khattab (He came to the Levant in the year 17 AH/638 AD).
- Amr bin Maadi Karb (Baalbek).
- Fadala ibn Ubayd (conquered Cyprus by sea and took over the district of Damascus).
- Qanan bin Darem al-Absi (Western Bekaa, Baalbek, and besieged Harbīs in the village).

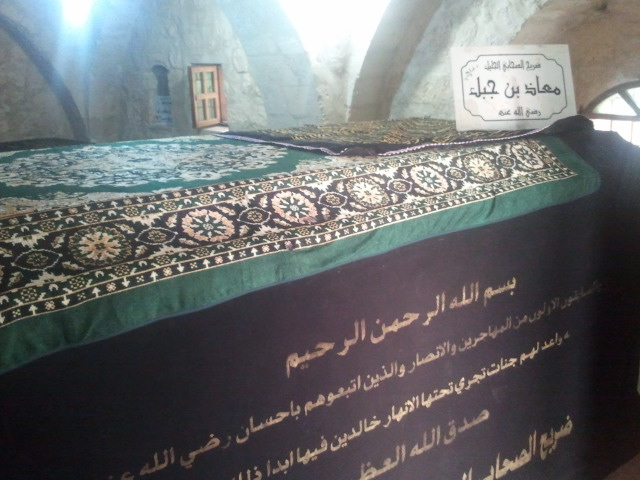
Grave of Muadh ibn Jabal, Jordan

- Muadh bin Jabal (at the forefront of the sieges of Baalbek).
- Muawiyah bin Abi Sufyan (recorded the Quran by writing) (invaded Beirut, coastal cities, Cyprus and several islands).
- Muammar bin Reab (Baalbek, he testified to its peace treaty).
- Milhan bin Ziyad Al-Taii (the western Bekaa and the siege of Baalbek).
- Maysara bin Masrouq Al-Absi (Baalbek).
- Wathila bin Al-Asqa (from the people of the Suffah) (invaded Marj Al-Silsilah).
- Wahshi bin Harb (Baalbek).
- Yasser bin Ammar bin Salama (Tyre).
- Yazid bin Abi Sufyan (brother of Muawiyah, conquered Baalbek, Beirut, Jbeil, Sidon and Tyre).

=== Ṣaḥābiyyat (female companions) ===
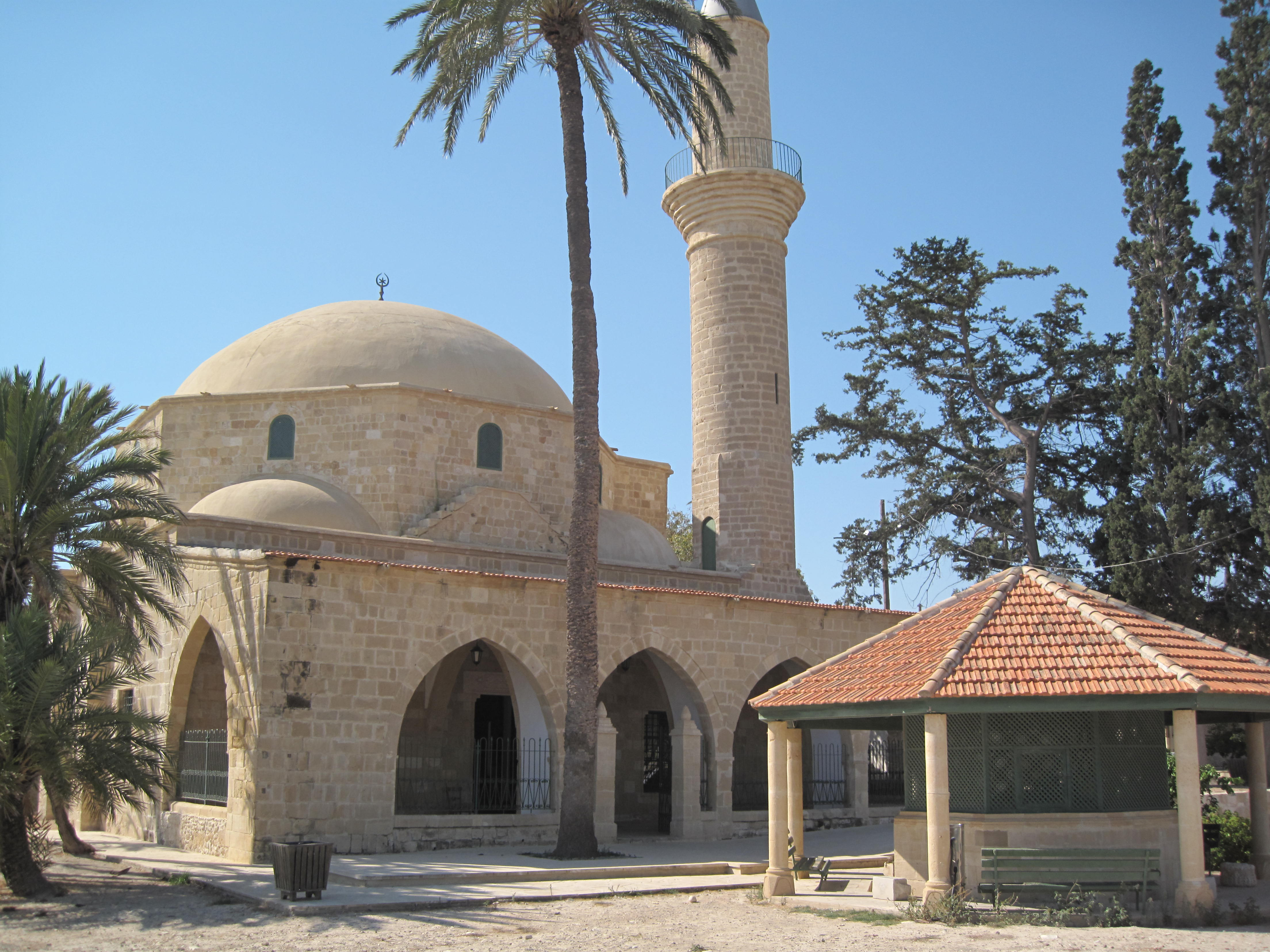
Hala Sultan Tekke, the burial place of Umm Haram bint Milhan Al-Ansariah, Cyprus

- Al-Sa'ba Bint Jabal (Sister of Mu'adh): Her grave is in Baalbek.
- Umm Al-Hakam bint Abi Sufyan (Sister of Muawiyah, she visited Lebanon by sea to Cyprus.)
- Umm Haram bint Milhan Al-Ansariah (Ubadah's wife).
- Hafsa bint Umayyah bin Harb (cousin of Muawiyah, wife of Sufyan the Conqueror of Tripoli): Tripoli.
- Fakhita bint Qarza (wife of Muawiyah, visited Lebanon by sea to Cyprus).
- Fatima bint Ghashem: She was buried in Baalbek.

== Architecture ==
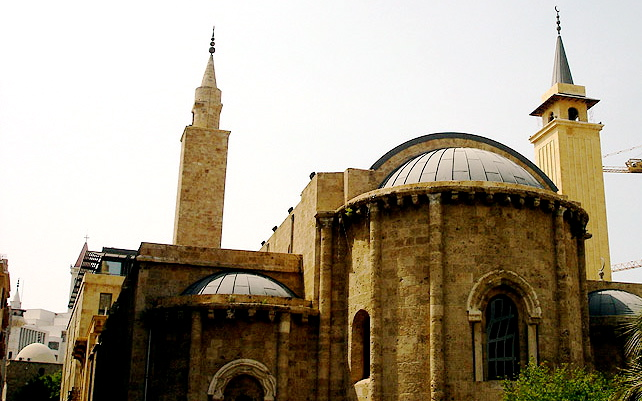
Al-Omari Grand Mosque in Beirut

- Al-Omari Grand Mosque, (Arabic: الْمَسْجِد الْعُمَرِيّ الْكَبِير) 635 AD, built during the reign of Islam's second Caliph Umar Bin El Khattab.
- The Monastery of Mar Yuhanna Maroun, Kfarhay, built in 676 AD by Patriarch John Maron who moved over the relics of the head of Maron into it making the Monastery the first Seat of the Maronite Patriarchate.

== See also ==
- Spread of Islam
- Early Muslim conquests
- List of Maronite patriarchs of Antioch
