= Sahl ibn Sa'd =

Companion of the Islamic prophet Muhammad

Sahl ibn Saʿd al-Sāʿidī (Arabic: سهل بن سعد الساعدي) was one of the prominent Sahaba, or direct companions of the Islamic prophet Muhammad, a member of the Ansar and an early Muslim scholar. He died in 91 AH. He was born as a Muslim; he narrated 188 hadiths. He married Aisha bint Khuzayma and had a son named Abbas ibn Sahl.

== See also ==
- 7th century in Lebanon § Ṣaḥāba who have visited Lebanon
