= Youssef Anis Abi-Aad =

Maronite Archbishop of Aleppo

Youssef Anis Abi-Aad IdP
- Archeparch of Aleppo
- Native name: يوسف أنيس أبي عاد
- Church: Maronite Church
- Archdiocese: Archeparchy of Aleppo
- In office: 7 June 1997 – 11 November 2013
- Predecessor: Pierre Callaos
- Successor: Joseph Tobji

Orders
- Ordination: 18 June 1966
- Consecration: 1 November 1997 by Nasrallah Boutros Sfeir

Personal details
- Born: 12 January 1940 Dfoun (south of Baissour), Mandatory Lebanese Republic, French Empire
- Died: 6 May 2017 (aged 77) Beirut, Lebanon

Youssef Anis Abi Aad, IdP (12 January 1940 – 6 May 2017) was the archeparch of the Maronite Catholic Archeparchy of Aleppo until November 2013.

== Life ==
Youssef Anis bin Jirjis Abi Aad was born on January 12, 1940 in the village of Dfoun in Lebanon.

Youssef Anis Abi Aad joined the Prado Secular Institute and received on 18 June 1966 his ordination to the priesthood.

On 7 June 1997 he was elected by the Maronite Synod to the Archbishopric of Aleppo. The Maronite Patriarch of Antioch and all the East, Cardinal Nasrallah Boutros Sfeir, gave him on 1 November of the same year the episcopal ordination. His co-consecrators were Bechara Boutros al-Rahi, OMM, Bishop of Byblos and present Maronite Patriarch of Antioch, and Paul Youssef Matar, Archbishop of Beirut.

During his episcopacy, the tomb of Saint Maron was discovered in the village of Brad, and on June 30, 2004, the Maronite Archdiocese of Aleppo declared Brad a pilgrimage site for the Maronite Church. In 2008, then MP Michel Aoun led a campaign to collect donations for the restoration of the Monastery of Saint Maron in Brad, launched through his OTV channel, and presented the Archbishop with a report on the donations made by citizens. In 2010, the Archbishop published a book entitled (Saint Maron: Light on his Life, Skete and Burial).

He remained Archbishop of Aleppo until his resignation following a serious health decline that sometimes resulted in him losing the ability to speak or remember words on November 11, 2013. He celebrated the fiftieth anniversary of his priesthood on May 2, 2016, at Our Lady of Al-Bir Church.

He died on May 6, 2017, in Beirut after suffering from severe back pain. A state funeral was held at St. Joseph Church, attended by Archbishops of Beirut Boulos Youssef Matar and Aleppo Archbishops Youssef Tobji. Lebanese President Michel Aoun sent the Minister of State for Presidential Affairs, Pierre Raffoul, on his behalf. Pope Francis sent a message of condolences, which was read by the papal nuncio. He was buried in the family cemetery in Dfoun. A year after his death, a pastoral center at the Church of Our Lady of the Well was named in his honor.
