= Blaouza =

Maronite village in Bsharri District, Lebanon

Blaouza بلوزا
- Village
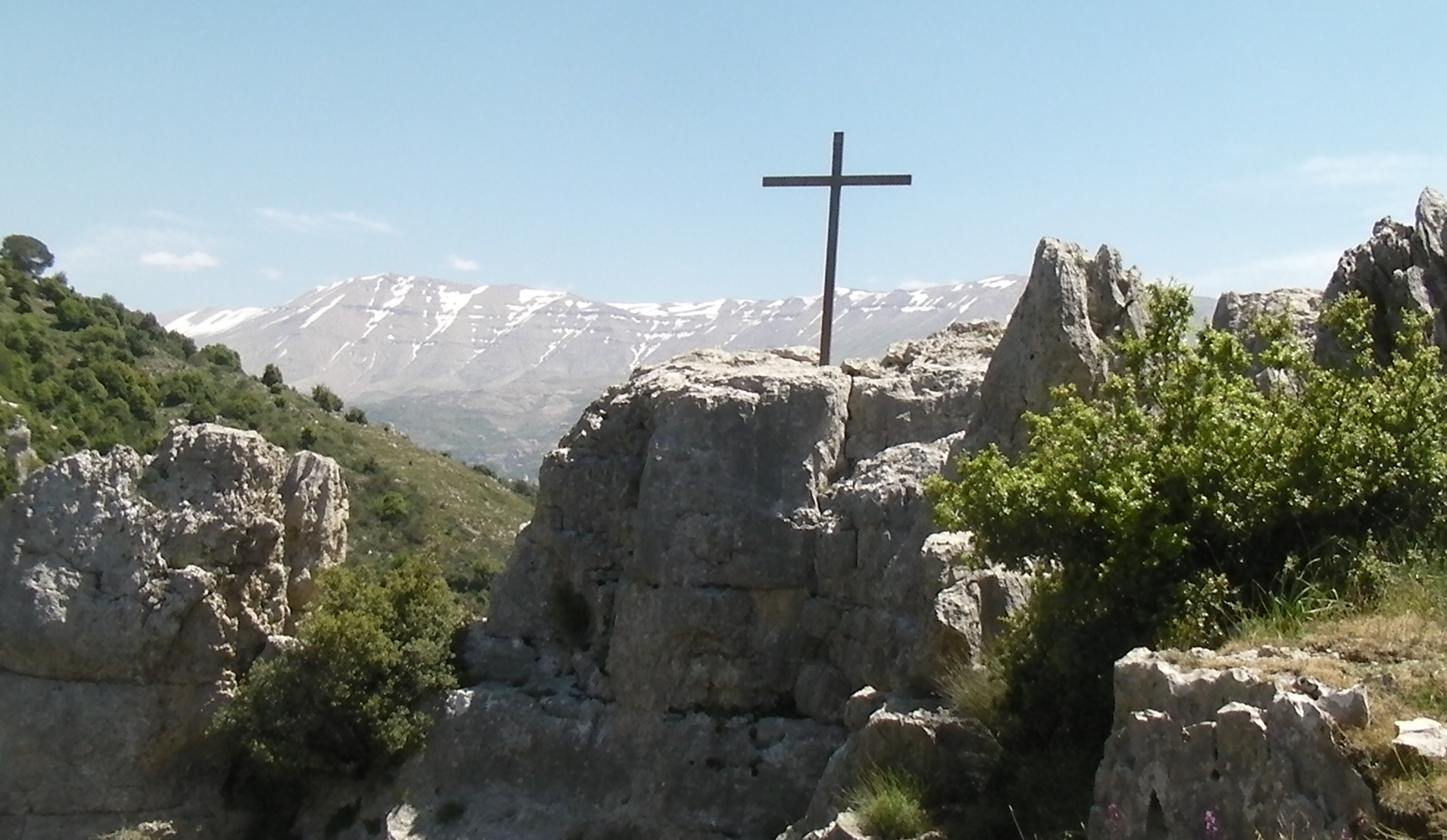
- View from the village towards the southeast

- Location within Lebanon
- Coordinates: 34°15′39″N 35°57′10″E
- Country: Lebanon
- Governorate: North Governorate
- District: Bsharri District
- Elevation: 1,320 m (4,330 ft)
- Time zone: UTC+2 (EET)
  - Summer (DST): UTC+3 (EEST)
- Dialing code: +961

Blaouza (Arabic: بلوزا), also spelt Blawza or Blouza, is a Maronite Christian village in the Bsharri District, in the North Governorate of Lebanon. The population is approximately 457 (2021), and the village lies at an altitude of 1,320 metres above sea level.

== The Village and its History ==
Blaouza lies in the Qannoubine Valley region of the Qadisha Valley, an area settled 1,000-1,300 years ago by Maronite refugees fleeing persecution in the remote mountains of Lebanon and Syria. In their isolation, the communities of the Qadisha Valley preserved their religion, customs and language until the modern era. Unlike most Maronites in Lebanon, residents of Blaouza (and the Qadisha Valley in general) claim to be of Aramean, rather than Phoenician descent.

Most villages in the region have Aramaic names, and the name Blaouza comes from the Aramaic for "almond plains". Until the early 20th century, most villagers were Aramaic-speakers, and as a result, Blaouza natives speak Arabic with a distinct accent. This is also true of many of the Maronite villages of the region.

In 1998 it was reported that Blaouza had a population of around 200, whilst there were an estimated 10,000 people in Sydney who identified their families as coming from the village.

== Demographics ==
In 2014 Christians made up 100% of registered voters in Blaouza. 98.80% of the voters were Maronite Catholics.

== Famous residents ==
- Gabriel of Blaouza (born circa 1625), Maronite Patriarch 1704-1705

== See also ==
- Bsharri District
- Kadisha Valley
- Maronites
- Lebanon
