= Gabriel of Blaouza =

Head of the Maronite Church from 1704 to 1705

Gabriel II (جبرائيل الثاني)
- Patriarch of Antioch
- Church: Maronite Church
- See: Patriarch of Antioch
- Elected: May 12, 1704
- Term ended: October 31, 1705
- Predecessor: Estephan El Douaihy
- Successor: Jacob Awad

Orders
- Consecration: 1663 (Bishop) by George Rizqallah Beseb'ely

Personal details
- Born: c. 1625 Blaouza, Lebanon
- Died: October 31, 1705 Qannubin Monastery, Kadisha Valley

Gabriel II of Blaouza (or Jibra'il al-Bluzani, Gabriel of Blawza, Arabic: جبرائيل الثاني, Latin: Gabriel Belusani, born in 1625, Blaouza, Lebanon - died on October 31, 1705, Qannubin Monastery, Kadisha Valley), was the 58th Maronite Patriarch of Antioch from 1704 to his death in 1705.

== Life ==
Gabriel of Blaouza was born in Blaouza, Lebanon in about 1625, the son of an archdeacon. He entered young in the monastery of St. Anthony of Qozhaya in the Kadisha Valley. Here, he was ordained priest on an unknown date.

Gabriel of Blaouza was appointed and consecrated Maronite bishop of Aleppo by Patriarch George Rizqallah Beseb'ely in 1663. He left his monastery and went to Aleppo, and served here as bishop for forty-one years till his election to Patriarch. During his service in Aleppo, he supported and helped Patriarch Estephan El Douaihy many times.

In 1672, he was chosen by Pope Clement X to deliver the pallium to the new patriarch Estephan El Douaihy, whom he became a valuable employee.

In 1673, while continuing to administer his diocese, he founded a monastery north of Beirut, where he lived most of the rest of his life.

Gabriel of Blaouza, after a previous attempt failed because of the opposition of the Druzes, succeed to found a religious order, the Antonin Maronite Order, characterized by a centralized organization with its proper hierarchy. The first Mass was celebrated in the newly erected church of his order at the Monastery of Mar Chaya on August 15, 1700. His order would be approved by Pope Clement XII in 1740.

After the death of Patriarch Estephan El Douaihy, Gabriel of Blaouza was elected Patriarch on May 12, 1704, and his election was confirmed by Pope Clement XI on April 27, 1705. Blaouza, however, received the pallium only in October 1705 and died suddenly on the eve of the Solemnity of All Saints' Day of the same year.

== See also ==
- List of Maronite Patriarchs
- Maronite Church

== Sources ==
- Pierre Dib, v. Maronite (Eglise), https://archive.org/stream/dictionnairedet10pt1vaca#page/n43/mode/2up, Tome Dixième, première partie, Paris 1928, coll. 72–73.
- Giuseppe Simone Assemani, Series chronologica Patriarcharum Antiochiae,https://archive.org/stream/serieschronologi00asseuoft#page/40/mode/2up, Rome 1881, p. 40.
- Konrad Eubel, Hierarchia Catholica Medii Aevi, https://archive.org/stream/hierarchiacathol05eubeuoft#page/89/mode/1up, p. 89.
