= Joseph Tobji =

Archeparch of Maronite Catholic Archeparchy of Aleppo

- Archeparch of Aleppo
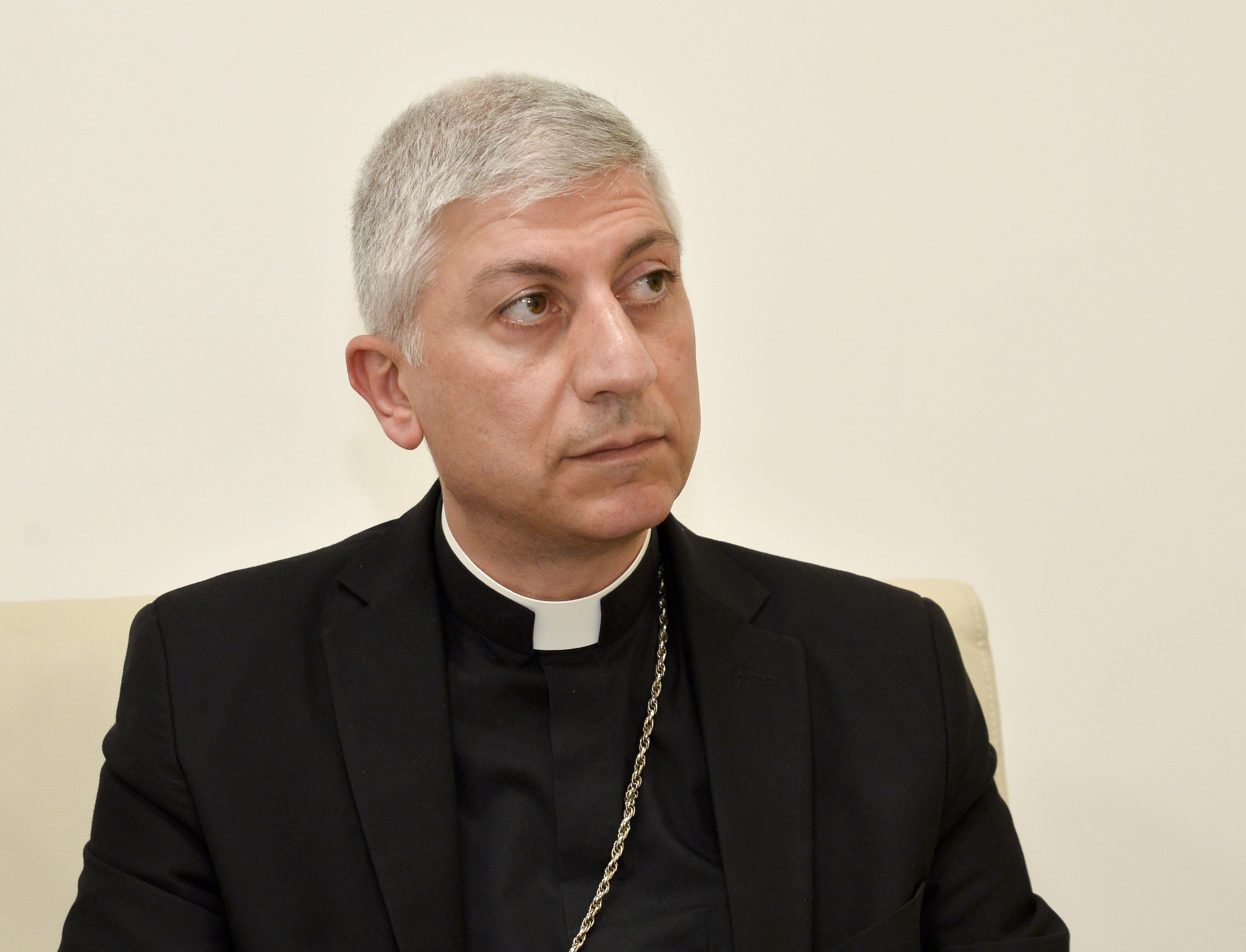
- Joseph Tobji meeting with the European Parliament Vice President, 2018
- Native name: چوزيف طوبجى
- Church: Maronite Church
- Archdiocese: Archeparchy of Aleppo
- Installed: 31 October 2015
- Predecessor: Youssef Anis Abi-Aad

Orders
- Ordination: 16 March 1996
- Consecration: 7 December 2015 by Bechara Boutros al-Rahi

Personal details
- Born: 28 March 1971 (age 55) Aleppo, Syrian Arab Republic

Joseph Tobji (born on 28 March 1971 in Aleppo, Syria) is the current archeparch of the Maronite Catholic Archeparchy of Aleppo.

== Life ==
Joseph Tobji received on 16 March 1996 the sacrament of Holy Orders for the Maronite Catholic Archeparchy of Aleppo.

The decision of the 14th Synod of Bishops of the Maronite Church on 14 March 2015 elected him Archbishop of Aleppo. Pope Francis approved his election as Archbishop of Aleppo on 31 October 2015.

On 7 December 2015 Tobji was ordained eparch by the hands of Maronite Patriarch of Antioch, Cardinal Bechara Boutros al-Rahi, OMM. His co-consecrators were his predecessor Youssef Anis Abi-Aad, IdP, Elias Khoury Sleman, Emeritus Eparch of Latakia and Antoine Chbeir, Eparch of Latakia.
