= Battle of Amioun =

694 Byzantine defeat in Lebanon by Maronites

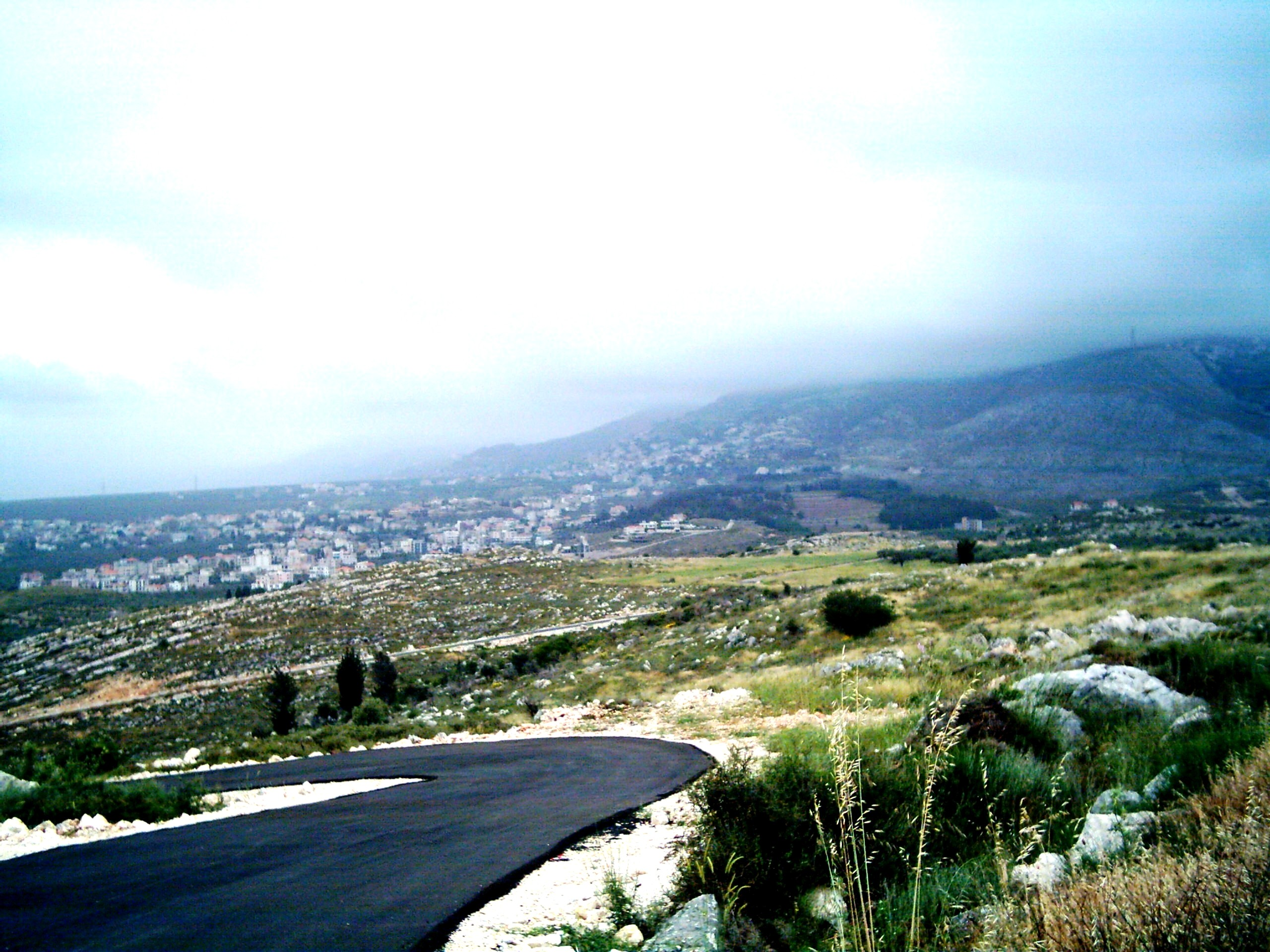
- Photo of Amioun, the probable place of the battle
Date	694 AD
Location	Southeast Amioun, near present day Kfaraakka, Lebanon 34°18′10.8″N 35°50′13.2″E
Result	Maronite victory
Territorial changes	The first Maronite state is established

Belligerents
Maronites; Mardaites	Byzantine Empire

Commanders and leaders
John Maron; Ibrahim; Masud	Justinian II; Maurikios †; Markianos (DOW)

Units involved
12,000	N/A

The Battle of Amioun (Arabic: معركة أميون) took place in Amioun, El-Koura, in 694 between Byzantine troops and Maronite and Mardaite Christians. The battle of Amioun devotes the independence of the first Maronite state, with Baskinta as its capital.

== Background ==
The seat of the Chalcedonian Christian Patriarch of Antioch had been vacant since 609 when the last residing patriarch was killed and after this titular patriarchs instead resided in Constantinople. This bothered the Christians of the Levant as they felt isolated without a spiritual leader among them. This led to the monastery of Maron electing John Maron, a Maronite monk and the bishop of Batroun, as the Patriarch of Antioch in 685.

This move was done without approval of the Byzantine emperor Justinian II and in retaliation for what he viewed as an act against his authority, in the year 694, he sent troops to pillage St. Maron’s monastery in Apamea which resulted in the death of 500 monks. John Maron however escaped to the citadel of Smar Jbeil before being caught.

== Battle ==
The Byzantine troops, led by generals Maurikios and Markianos, were then sent to Lebanon to capture John Maron. John Maron’s nephew, prince Ibrahim, alongside prince Masud of the Mardaites routed the Byzantines at Amioun and defeated them. Both generals were killed with Maurikios in Amioun and Markianos succumbing to his wounds in Shoueti (Shwita).

== Aftermath ==
Following the battle, John Maron established the new headquarters of the Maronite Patriarchate in Kfarhay where he enshrined the relic of Saint Maron’s skull. The residency, now known as the monastery of Mar Youhanna Maroun, still exists along with the relic.

The citizens of Amioun buried Maurikios in their town and built a church over his grave, dedicating 26 July as his feast day. As for Markianos, he was injured in battle and was carried to Shoueti (Shwita) where he was pronounced dead. The Byzantine soldiers built a temple dedicated to him which became known as "Markianos’ Castle". Monsignor Michael Al Zaribi mentions that the castle was still in good shape in 1870 and was mounted by a 40 foot tower. The stones of the tower have been used to build Mohammad Bey Al Abboud’s palace in Bireh of Akkar, Ali Agha Al Asaad’s palace in Akkar al-Atika, and the Carmelite Monastery in Kobayat.

The battle also led to improved relations between the Umayyads and Maronites. According to Ibn Asakir’s History of Damascus the Arab caliph Omar bin Abdul Aziz was buried in the Maronite Church of Saint Simeon Stylites. Abd al Malik visited the monastery and his son Al-Walid died and was buried in it and his grave is still in the monastery of Saint Simon Stylites today. Several Umayyad princes celebrated their weddings in Saint Maroun’s monastery in Damascus.

== Legacy ==
After the death of the last titular patriarch of Antioch in 702, John Maron became the only Chalcedonian patriarch holding the title until the Eastern Orthodox Church reestablished the seat in 742. John Maron died in 707 and was buried in Kfarhay. He is seen as a Saint and the founder of the Maronite Church and his feast day is celebrated on March 2nd.

The valley of Wadi Harba (Arabic: وادي حربا, lit. 'Valley of War') owes its namesake to the battle with the word Harba (Syriac: ܚܪܒܐ) meaning war in Syriac.

There is also a water spring near Madfoun, in the valley, known as Mar Youhanna Maroun spring.

Lebanese researcher Chedid al-Azar writes:

Although we are not trying to deal in warfare, a unique battle we shall mention for the impact it has left, this is the battle of south East Amyun, in the year 694, precipitated by mountain dwellers of Maronite Christian faith, as a revenge against the army of Justinian II of Byzantium, for the destruction of a monastery sheltering 350, monks adherents of Marūn, in northern Syria, near Apamea (Afamiyaħ), 350 km (217 mi) from Amyun. The battle was fought by a group of Marūn adherents who had sought refuge formerly in the mountains facing Amyun, from the east and made a surprise attack, under the leadership of Yuhanna Marūn, against a contingent of the Byzantine army, which was defeated and the Marūn adherents returned to their mountainous sites, to stay in a state of isolation, which marked and stamped the history of the Maronites as dwellers of the mountains of Lebanon, by isolationism, that persisted among the mountainous adherents up to our present days and had touched their performances and deliberations in modern Lebanon.

=== Poem ===
The Maronite Patriarch Joseph IV Halib of Akoura (r. 1644–1648) wrote a poem about the battle:

خرجوا من اسطنبتول متفقين
معمجوقةاعداءشياطين
ملولين والسيوف على الموارنة
خالفوالارون وطاعوا الملكية
فيه (الموارنة) من طاع ومن خالف
والسيففوق راسەمولف
والبسعضمن‌الفزعتخلف
.وطاءسواإلىالملكية
داموافي الشرمصطدمين
ى والمقدمين نزل الامير مسعود
والعساكر في أميون مجتمعين
والق-تثتلوقعفي اللكية
انقتلوا القواد في أميون
وانتصر جماعة مارون
والروم على موريق إبنون
...كني سةلليوممسميه

== See also ==
- 7th century in Lebanon
- Amioun
- Baskinta
- Byzantine Empire
- Monothelitism
- Maronite Church
- List of Lebanese battles

== Notes ==
1.Not counting the Non-Chalcedonian Syriac Orthodox patriarch
