= George Beseb'ely =

Head of the Maronite Church from 1657 to 1670

George II Rizqallah Beseb'ely (جرجس الثاني رزق الله البسبعلي)
- Patriarch of Antioch
- Church: Maronite Church
- See: Patriarch of Antioch
- Elected: January 1, 1657
- Term ended: April 12, 1670
- Predecessor: John Bawab Safrawy
- Successor: Estephan El Douaihy

Orders
- Consecration: July 25, 1656 (Bishop) by John Bawab Safrawy

Personal details
- Born: c. 1595 Beseb'el, Lebanon
- Died: April 12, 1670 Keserwan District, Lebanon

George II Rizqallah Beseb'ely (or Jirjis al-Basba'li, Beseb'ely, Arabic: جرجس الثاني رزق الله البسبعلي, Latin: Georgius Sebelensis, 1595, Beseb'el, Lebanon – April 12, 1670, Keserwan District, Lebanon), was the 56th Maronite Patriarch of Antioch from 1657 to his death in 1670.

== Life ==
George Beseb'ely was born in the village of Beseb'el (from which his surname came), near Tripoli, Lebanon, in about 1595, son of Hadj Rizqallah. He was chosen as auxiliary bishop and consecrated by Patriarch John Bawab Safrawy on July 25, 1656.

After the death of Patriarch John Bawab Safrawy happened on December 23, 1656, the bishops elected as patriarch the monk George Habquq, who anyway for humility refused and escaped in a cave of the Kadisha Valley to live as an hermit. So a second election was held and on January 1, 1657, the Archbishop George Beseb'ely was elected patriarch. The new patriarch sent to Rome his credentials to obtain confirmation of the pope; but, for unknown reasons, the Holy See took the deal for long, to the point that the patriarch had to renew his instances. His election was confirmed by Pope Alexander VII on May 26, 1659, and he received the pallium on August 30, 1660.

George Beseb'ely used, as his predecessor, to live in a monastery subject to the strict discipline of the monks. During his patriarchate he kept good relations with the Kingdom of France, which in 1662 appointed for the first time as French Consul in Beirut a Maronite noble, Abu Nawfal of the Khazen family. This act strengthened the friendship and protection of the France towards the Maronite nation.

George Beseb'ely died on April 12, 1670, because of a pestilence in the monastery of Mar Challita in Keserwan District.

== See also ==
- List of Maronite Patriarchs
- Maronite Church

== Sources ==
- Pierre Dib, v. Maronite (Eglise), https://archive.org/stream/dictionnairedet10pt1vaca#page/n41/mode/2up, Tome Dixième, première partie, Paris 1928, coll. 68–70.
- Joseph Simon Assemani, https://archive.org/stream/serieschronologi00asseuoft#page/40/mode/2up, Rome 1881, p. 39.
- Konrad Eubel, Hierarchia Catholica Medii Aevi, http://sul-derivatives.stanford.edu/derivative?CSNID=00002719&mediaType=application/pdf, p. 87.
