= Estephan El Douaihy =

Head of the Maronite Church from 1670 to 1704

Blessed Estephan El Douaihy إسطفان الدويهي
- Patriarch of Antioch
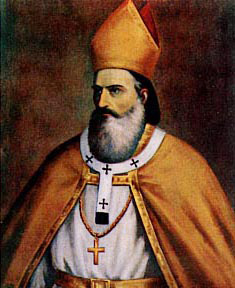
- Church: Maronite Church
- See: Patriarch of Antioch
- Elected: 20 May 1670
- Term ended: 3 May 1704
- Predecessor: George Rizqallah Beseb'ely
- Successor: Gabriel of Blaouza

Orders
- Ordination: 25 March 1656 (Priest) by John Safrawy
- Consecration: 8 July 1668 (Bishop) by George Rizqallah Beseb'ely

Personal details
- Born: 2 August 1630 Ehden, Lebanon
- Died: 3 May 1704 (aged 73) Qannoubine, Lebanon
- Parents: Father: Mikhayil Moussa El Douaihy, Mother: Mariam El Douaihy.

Sainthood
- Feast day: May 3
- Venerated in: Catholic Church
- Beatified: 2 August 2024; Bkerké, Lebanon by Cardinal Marcello Semeraro

Estephan El Douaihy or Istifan al-Duwayhi (Arabic: اسطفانوس الثاني بطرس الدويهي / ALA-LC: Isṭifānūs al-thānī Buṭrus al-Duwayhī; French: Étienne Douaihi; Latin: Stephanus Dovaihi; Italian: Stefano El Douaihy; 2 August 1630 – 3 May 1704) was the 57th Patriarch of the Maronite Church, serving from 1670 until his death. He was born in Ehden, Lebanon.

He is considered one of the major Lebanese historians of the 17th century and is known as “The Father of Maronite History”, “Pillar of the Maronite Church”, “The Second Chrysostom”, “Splendor of the Maronite Nation”, and “The Glory of Lebanon and the Maronites”. After his death, he was declared a Servant of God by the Congregation for the Causes of Saints. On 3 July 2008 Pope Benedict XVI declared him Venerable. On August 2, 2024, he was beatified at a ceremony held in Bkerké, Lebanon.

== Biography ==
=== Early life ===
Estephan El Douaihy was born on 2 August 1630 in Ehden to the noble Douaihy family. At the age of eleven, recognized as a brilliant young talent, he was sent to the Maronite College (Seminary) in Rome. He studied there for fourteen years, from 1641 to 1655, being cured of a serious condition that almost led to blindness. Douaihy believed that the intercession of the Blessed Virgin Mary was responsible for his cure. While in Italy, he traveled as widely as possible seeking manuscripts dealing with Maronite history and liturgy. When he returned to Lebanon at the age of 25, he continued his research.

On 25 March 1656 he was ordained priest by Patriarch Safrawy. In 1658, he was sent to serve the Maronite parish in Aleppo. He was appointed apostolic visitor in countryside Lebanon, and later he served in the parish of Ardeh. In 1662, he was again sent to Aleppo, where he remained until 21 May 1668. On his return, he went on a pilgrimage to the Holy Land. On 8 July 1668 he was appointed and consecrated bishop of the Maronite Diocese of Cyprus by Patriarch George Beseb'ely. He travelled to Cyprus for a pastoral visit in 1669.

=== Election to Patriarchate ===
As bishop, and later as Patriarch, he undertook reforms of the Maronite Church and its monks. Douaihy was elected Patriarch on 20 May 1670, when he was only 40 years old, but was confirmed by Rome only on 8 August 1672. This is universally seen as an acknowledgment of his personal moral qualities, his extraordinary learning, and his keen appreciation of the issues the Maronites faced. He paid particular attention to the traditions of the Maronite Church, and favoured a de-Latinisation of rites and ceremonies. He was hounded by Ottoman authorities, who resented his principled appeals for justice for the Maronites. In particular, they were frustrated by his resistance to their oppressive taxation policies: policies which saw the abandonment of many villages by peasants unable to pay their taxes. It was also a period when Maronites and, in particular, their clergy, were liable to sudden arrest, assault and murder. The Patriarch was not exempt, being assaulted himself. He was accordingly obliged to move from place to place, however he maintained his writing.

Douaihy traveled throughout the Maronite world, including Cyprus and Aleppo. This is partly because Aleppo was at that time a focus for the international overland trade, the only trade where the Ottoman Empire had any opening, given the European domination of the sea routes.

=== Death and afterward ===
Almost immediately after his death, on 3 May 1704 in Qannubine, Kadisha Valley, he was considered by many Maronites of Lebanon, but particularly in North Lebanon and in Zgharta, Ehden to have been a saint. The Congregation of the Causes of Saints issued the decree of nulla osta for his beatification cause on 5 December 1996. The Patriarchate of Antioch of the Maronites proceeded with the diocesan investigation and, at its culmination, submitted the results to congregation, which validated the proceedings with a decree dated 8 November 2002. The Positio for the beatification cause was published in 2005 and it received the approval of the Historical Commission of the Congregation of the Causes of Saints on 24 January 2006. On 3 July 2008 Pope Benedict XVI authorised the Congregation for the Causes of Saints to draw up a decree on the heroic virtues of Patriarch Douaihy who will be referred to as Venerable from the moment of publication of the decree. Some of the miracles attributed to him have been collected by M.S. El Douaihy.

A miracle attributed to his intercession was investigated and was subject to a diocesan investigation; the miracle received formal ratification from the Congregation for the Causes of Saints on 30 January 2014. Pope Francis approved the miracle required for his beatification on 17 March 2024, and he was beatified on August 2, 2024 in Bkerke, Lebanon.

== Religious, philosophical and/or political views ==
Douaihy strongly believed in the social importance of education and science (being an amateur scientist himself). Given the importance of learning, and his experience in how far European education exceeded Oriental, he pursued a successful policy of sending as many Maronites to Rome as possible, to become capable of returning to the villages in which the Maronite peasantry lived, and raising the level of general education. Douaihy established a college in Aleppo, which became the base for the development of renewed monastic orders. As with his educational policy, his monastic renewal was a success, and still bears fruit today.

== Works ==
Of the many works of Patriarch Douaihy, the vast bulk are still available only in Arabic. A selection has been translated into French by Youakim Moubarac in Pentalogie antiochenne/domaine Maronite. That selection focusses upon his discussion of the rites and ceremonies of the Maronite Church. However, his major work is a general history book, Tarikh Al Azminah, available in several versions.

=== Published works ===
- Duwayhī, I., & Fahd, B. (1976). Tārīkh al-azminah. Dar Lahd Khatir, Lebanon. OCLC 41272562
- Duwayhī, I., & Tawtal, F. (1951). Tārīkh al-azminah, 1095–1699. Bayrūt: al-Matbaaah al-Kāthūlīkīyah. OCLC 23523055
- Duwayhī, I., & Hage, L. (1987). The Syriac model strophes and their poetic meters, by the Maronite Patriarch Stephen Douayhi an introduction, translation, commentary and critical edition. Kaslik, Lebanon: University of the Holy Spirit. OCLC 30610816
- Duwayhī, I., & Shartūnī, R. a.-K. (1980). Manārat al-aqdās. Rābitat al-Batrīark Istīfān al-Duwayhī al-Thaqāfīyah, Zgharta, Lebanon. OCLC 30043985
- Duwayhī, I., & Fahd, B. (1974). Kitāb al-sharh al-mukhtassar fī asl al-Mawārinah wa-thabātihim fī al-amānah wa-ṣiyānatihim min kull bidaah wa-kihānah. [Bayrūt]: Butrus Fahd. OCLC 17213148
- Duwayhī, I., & Daww, A. (1973). Asl al-Mawārinah. Manshūrāt Muaassasat al-Turāth al-Ihdinī, 1. Ihdan, Lebanon: [Muaassasat al-Turāth al-Ihdinī]. OCLC 43236202
- Duwayhī, I., & Hage, L. (1986). Les strophes-types syriaques et leurs mètres poétiques du patriarche maronite Etienne Douayhi. Bibliothèque de l'Université Saint-Esprit, 13. Kaslik, Liban: Bibliothèque de l'Université Saint-Esprit. OCLC 31052160
- Duwayhī, I., & Shartūnī, R. a.-K. (1890). Tārīkh al-tāifah al-Mārūnīyah. Bayrūt: al-Matbaah al-Kāthūlīkīyah. OCLC 25520233
- Duwayhī, I., & Fahd, B. (1974). Liber brevis explicationis de Maronitarum origine eorumque perpetua orthodoxia et salute ab omni haeresi et superstitione. S.l: s.n.]. OCLC 37682271

== See also ==
- List of Maronite Patriarchs
- Maronite Church
