= Battle of Qnat =

Battle between Lebanese Front and Syrian forces in 1980

- Part of Syrian intervention in the Lebanese Civil War & Lebanese Civil War
| Date | 12–17 February 1980 |
| Location | Qnat, Bsharri District |
| Territorial changes | Syrian Arab Army withdraws to nearby villages |

Belligerents
| Lebanese Front: Kataeb Regulatory Forces; Adonis Defense Units; Tyous Team of Commandos | Syria: Syrian Arab Army; Defense Companies; Supported by: Marada Brigade |

Casualties and losses
| 15 killed 12 wounded | 62 killed (Claimed by Kataeb) |
- 50 civilians killed

The Battle of Qnat, was a military confrontation that occurred from February 12 to 17, 1980, in the village on Qnat, Bsharri District.

== Background ==
After the Syrian invasion, there wasn't much of a difference in the town, but in 1978 checkpoints were installed by the Syrians. Because of this, most of the population entered and exited the town through Mazraat Bani Saab and Beit Kassab. One day, Antoine el-Khazen, the leader of the town's militia was kidnapped by the Syrians but a successful mission by the town's people rescued him. The Marada Brigade then started to harass the population of the town and assisted the Syrians. The town leaders then met with a military commander of the Lebanese Front who told them that Qnat was at a disadvantage geographically and militarily, but the townspeople insisted on staying to defend it.

== Battle ==
On Tuesday, February 12, 1980, following clashes between the Kateab and the Marada Brigade, a Syrian patrol unit entered the town of Qnat and skirmishes then began between the Phalangist combatants. The patrol unit was helped by the Marada Brigade in order to facilitate their plans.

On the morning of the 13th, Lebanese reinforcements arrived headed by Assad Arida and Hani Rahme. 11 Lebanese reinforcements also arrived from the "Adonis Defense Units", headed by Hanna Atik, along with 7 "commandos", led by Suleiman Hoayek. The next day, 9 more Adonis units arrived, and the day after that, in the morning at 5:30 AM, Syrian commandos started to move towards the school in the middle of the town which was the center of the local militia. Clashes then ensued, and at 7:00 AM, an RPG fired at a tank and disabled it. The Syrians heavily bombarded the school, destroying the upper floors and wounding two Lebanese fighters.

On February 15, 9 more Lebanese reinforcements arrived and that day at 5:00 AM; the Syrian commandos conducted a targeted bombardment of the school along with a ground operation until they reached 50 meters from the school. Violent clashes then ensued in the east of the town, and at around 3:00 PM the Syrians retreated leaving behind dozens of dead and military equipment. A half hour later, they tried to infiltrate again, but they were discovered early and pushed back. Two Lebanese combatants were wounded that day but morale was high. During the night of the 15th, 6 Syrian troop carriers arrived, carrying reinforcements for the Syrians. Near midnight that night, Bob Haddad led a group of Lebanese fighters through the mountains to the town as well.

The following morning, on Saturday, the Lebanese launched a two pronged surprise attack on the Syrians. One group, led by Fouad Abou Nader, would attack from Mazraat Bani Saab, and another, led by Samir Geagea, would attack from the town. The attack was effective; on Sunday, February 17, the two parties agreed to a ceasefire, and Lebanese fighters withdrew to Bani Saab and Assaf. That evening, as fighters were attempting to withdraw, one of their fighters, Michel Haddad was killed. Syria then threatened to use aerial attacks, putting helicopters on standby at Hamat Airport. The Syrian army eventually gained control of the town, but not before most residents had evacuated. The Syrians would end up withdrawing from the town and the nearby farms. The fighters retreated to the town of Niha and Beit Kassab, which remained a line of conflict throughout the war. Several thousand civilians were also displaced during the battle and stranded in the cold weather and snow.

== Legacy ==
The battle turned Samir Geagea, the son of a modest family from the village of Bcharri, into a respected leader and a member of Maronite community's new elite. When describing this battle, Bachir Gemayel said: "The Battle of Qnat paralleled the Hundred Days' War in Achrafieh".
