= Mazraat Assaf =

Village in Bsharri District, Lebanon

Mazraat Assaf مزرعة عساف
- Village
- Location within Lebanon
- Coordinates: 34.24939°N 35.87482°E
- Country: Lebanon
- Governorate: North Governorate
- District: Bsharri District
- Elevation: 953 m (3,127 ft)
- Time zone: UTC+2 (EET)
  - Summer (DST): UTC+3 (EEST)
- Dialing code: +06

Mazraat Assaf (Arabic: مزرعة عساف, romanized: Mazraʿat ʿAssāf), also spelled Mazraat Aassaf, is a village in the Bsharri District of Lebanon. The village is located near the towns of Qnat and Mazraat Bani Saab. The Greek Orthodox Annunciation of the Theotokos Church is celebrated in the town. In 2009, there were 336 voters in the town, and there were 329 voters in the year 2014 with 165 females and 164 males.

== Demographics ==
In 2014 Christians made up 99.70% of registered voters in Mazraat Assaf. 56.23% of the voters were Greek Orthodox and 41.95% were Maronite Catholics.
