= Billa, Lebanon =

Municipality in Bsharri District, Lebanon

Bella بلا
- Municipality
- Location within Lebanon
- Coordinates: 34.2829326°N 35.8980341°E
- Country: Lebanon
- Governorate: North Governorate
- District: Bsharri District
- Elevation: 1,221 m (4,006 ft)
- Time zone: UTC+2 (EET)
  - Summer (DST): UTC+3 (EEST)
- Dialing code: +06

Billa (Arabic: بلا, romanized: Billā) is a municipality in the Bsharri District, North Governorate of Lebanon. The village is located near the towns of Barhalyoun and Aabdine. In 2014, there were 429 voters with 220 males and 209 females.

== Demographics ==
In 2014 Christians made up 100% of registered voters in Billa. 96.97% of the voters were Maronite Catholics.
