= Bsharri District =

Coordinates: 34.251062°N 36.010973°E

- District
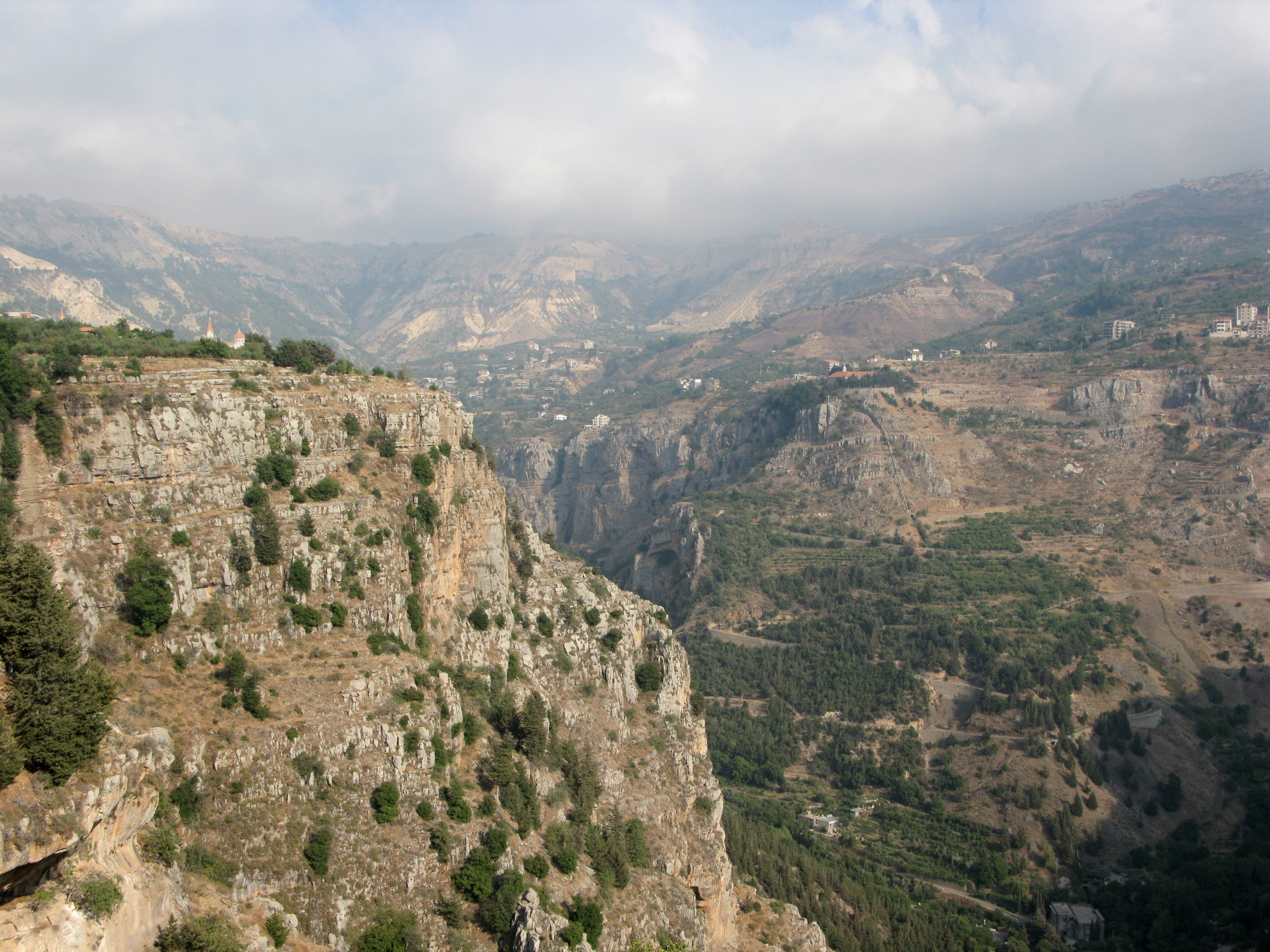
- Kadisha valley, Bsharri District

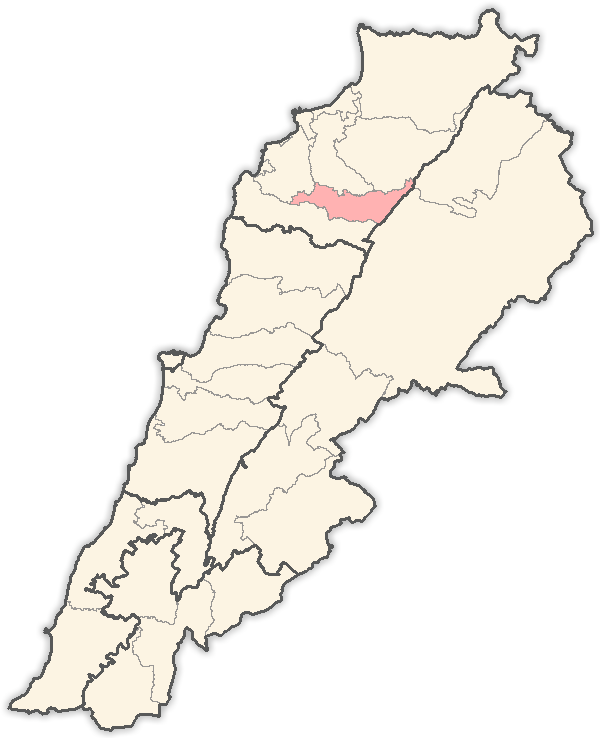
- Location in Lebanon
- Country: Lebanon
- Governorate: North Governorate
- Capital: Bsharri

Area
  - Total: 60 sq mi (156 km^{2})

Population
  - Estimate (31 December 2017): 28,231
- Time zone: UTC+2 (EET)
  - Summer (DST): UTC+3 (EEST)

Bsharri District (often spelled Bsharre, Bcharre or Bcharreh) is one of the six districts (qadaa, قضاء) of the North Governorate, Lebanon.

== Overview and geography ==
Surrounded by mountains, the Bsharri District sits on cliffs. The district is bordered by the Zgharta and Miniyeh-Danniyeh Districts to the north, the Koura District to the west, the Baalbek District to the east, and the Batroun District to the south.

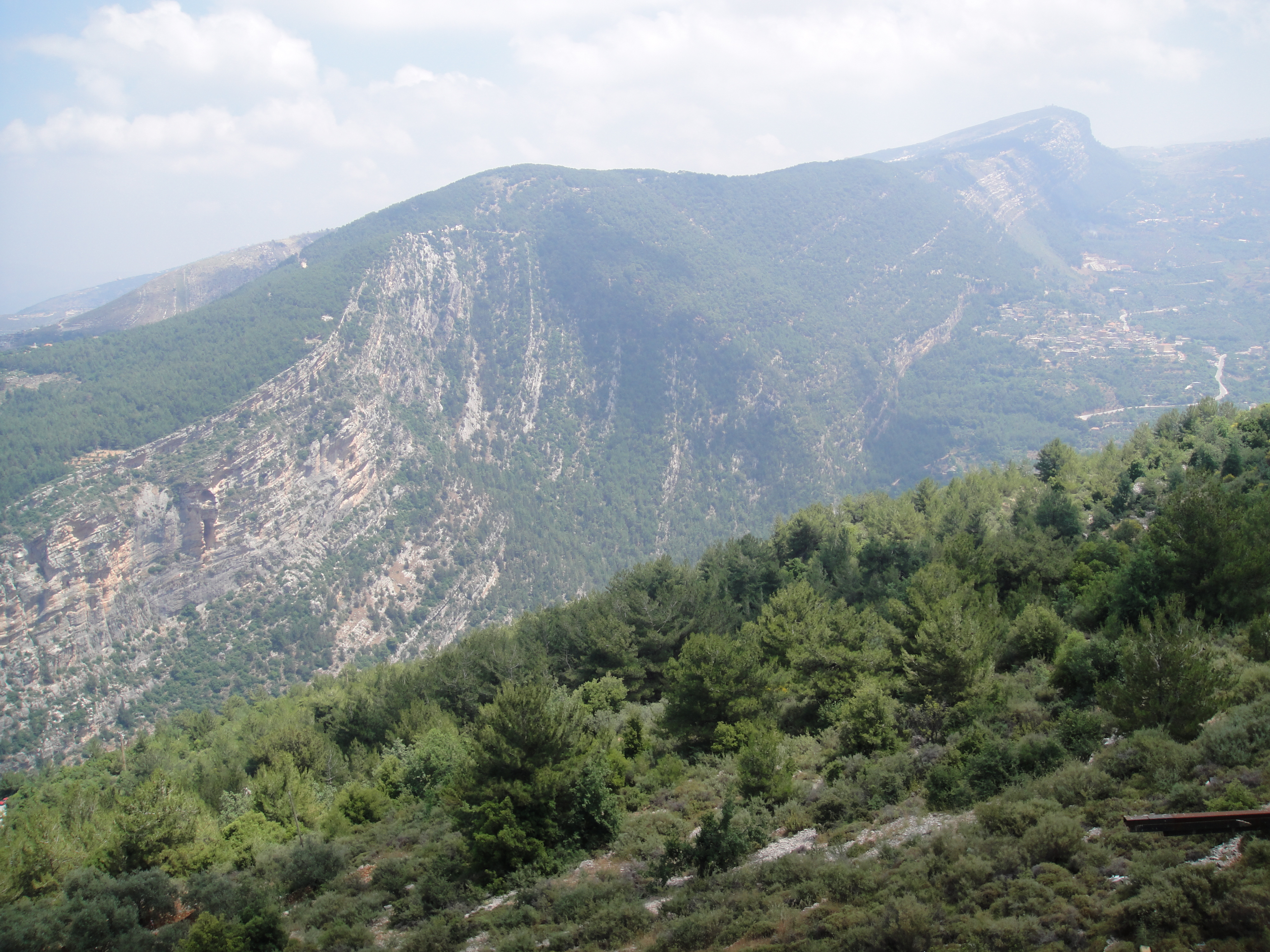

This district is a cluster of 26 villages. most of them are 1,000 meters above sea level and higher. Within the district is one of the most important landmarks to Eastern Christianity and Maronite history - Qannubin Monastery. The major part of the Kadisha Valley, known as Qannoubine Valley is where Hermits have resided since around the year 600 CE, the last being Father Antonios Tarabay (fr), whose file at the Vatican is progressing toward beatification. He lived most of his life in the ancient Monastery of Saint Elisha located in a grotto deep in the Qannoubine Valley. In this valley, there are more than 26 monasteries all more than 1,000 years old. The top part of the valley is the location of the legendary cedar forest, the Cedars of God.

== Population ==
The population of the district was estimated to be 76,831 by the Ministry of Social Affairs. The capital of the district is Bsharri.

== Religion and history ==
The Bsharri district is populated by more than 94% Maronite Christian. Having some 37 churches, Bsharri is sometimes called the "City of Churches." Five saints recognized by the Catholic Church hailed from Lebanon. The most prominent is Saint Charbel from Bekaa Kafra, the town with the highest elevation in the district. Many people from Lebanon and other countries in the world greatly honor Saint Charbel, known for his miracles of healing for Christians, Muslims, and those from all religious backgrounds who visit his hometown, seeking his intercession.

Bsharri has deep religious roots for Christianity, as Maronites used the caves within the cliffs to hide and escape religious persecution. These caves could not be reached by horses or heavily armed soldiers. The area survived several invasions including the Mamluk Sultanate invasion that was known for its brutality. This Maronite stronghold became a refuge for persecuted Christians in the area, due to its geographic characteristics with protective mountains for all the towns around the valley. During winter, the snow covers the mountains, and this further isolates the area as it becomes accessible only from two entrances at the beginning of Kadisha valley, which translates to the "Holy Valley." This location played a crucial and historical role through the years for the persecuted Maronites who fled to Bsharri.

== Cedars of Lebanon ==
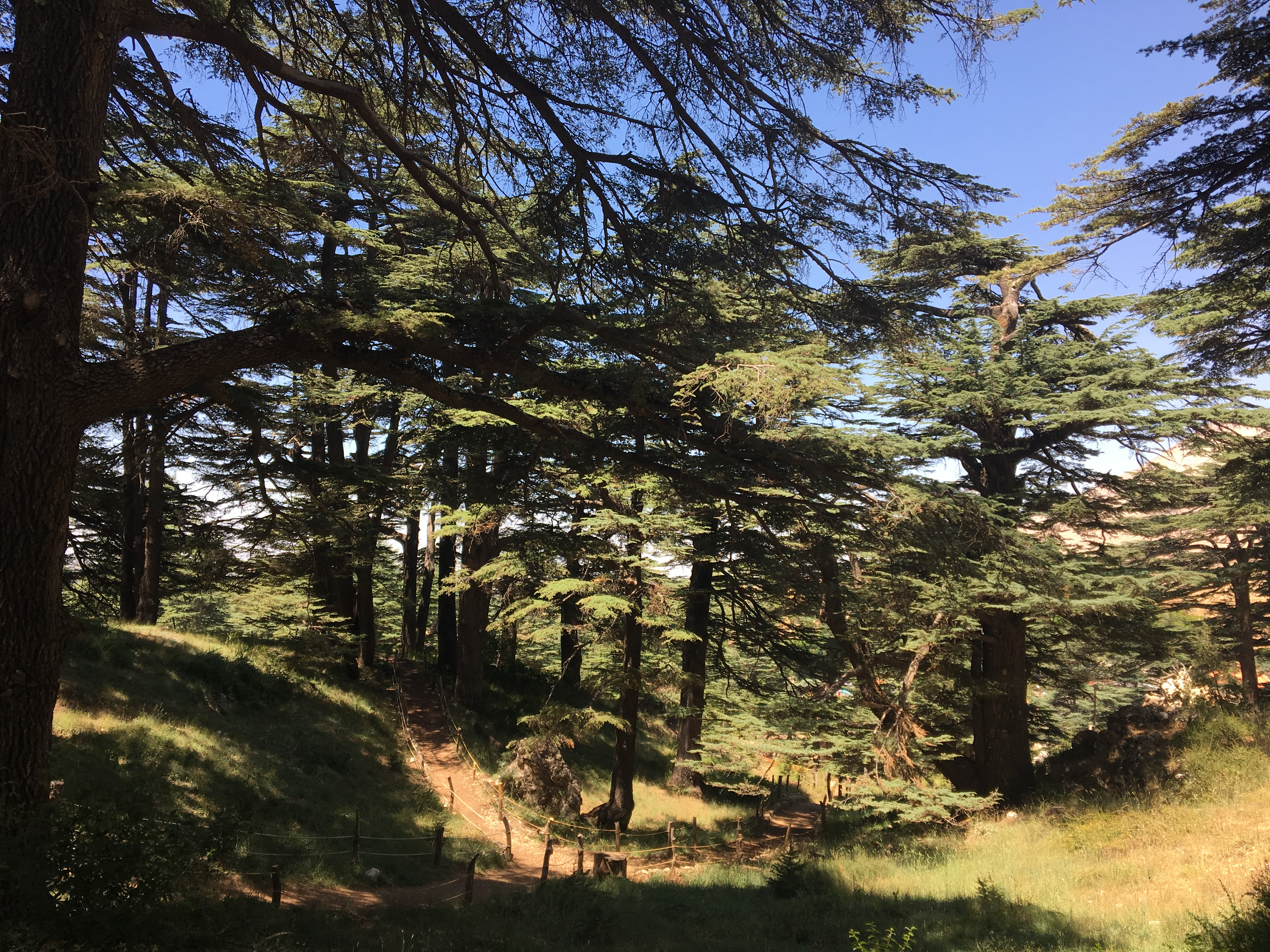
The Cedars of Lebanon

The Cedars of Lebanon are also known as the Cedars of God, and are mentioned 103 times in the Bible. Historically, the timber of these trees was exploited by numerous empires that crossed Lebanon, including the Phoenicians, Assyrians, Egyptians, Turks, Romans, Arabs, Israelites, Persians, and Babylonians. The trees were used by King Solomon to build the Temple in Jerusalem and by the Phoenicians to build merchant ships; the resin was used by the Egyptians for mummification. The cedars forest used to grow and thrive across Mount Lebanon but today they are endangered as only 375 trees remain. The cedar tree on the Lebanese flag represents a national symbol, as Lebanon is referred to as the Land of the Cedars and symbolizes eternity, prosperity, and steadiness.

== Notable people ==
Charbel Makhlouf, Maronite monk and priest known as the Miracle Monk of Lebanon, was born in Bekaa Kafra.

Khalil Gibran, a writer, painter, sculptor, and philosopher, was born and raised in Bsharri prior to immigrating to the United States.

Anthony Peter Arida, bishop of the Maronite Catholic Archeparchy of Tripoli and 73rd Maronite Patriarch of Antioch, was born in Bqarqacha.

== Towns and villages ==
| Aabdine | Beit Minzer | Bsharri | Hadchit | Qnaywer |
| Bane | Bekaa Kafra | Brisat | Hasroun | Qnat |
| Bani Saab | Billa | Dimane | Tourza | |
| Bazoun | Blaouza | El-Arz | Mazraat Assaf | |
| Barhalyoun | Bqarqacha | Hadath El Jebbeh | Moghr El Ahwal | |

== Demographics ==
According to registered voters:

| Year | Christians | | | | | Muslims | | | | Druze |
| Year | Total | Maronites | Greek Orthodox | Greek Catholics | Other Christians | Total | Sunnis | Shias | Alawites | Druze |
|---|---|---|---|---|---|---|---|---|---|---|
| 2014 | 99.36% | 94.77% | 2.72% | 1.12% | 0.75% | 0.26% | 0.20% | 0.05% | 0.01% | 0.00% |
| 2018 | 99.72% | 94.64% | 2.81% | 1.13% | 1.14% | 0.28% | 0.22% | 0.05% | 0.01% | 0.00% |
| 2022 | 99.84% | 94.89% | 2.93% | 1.16% | 0.86% | 0.16% | 0.15% | 0.01% | 0.00% | 0.00% |
| 2026 | 100% | 99.36% | —N/a | —N/a | 0.64% | 0.00% | 0.00% | 0.00% | 0.00% | 0.00% |

Number of registered voters (21+ years old) over the years.

| Years | Men | Women | Total | Growth (%) |
|---|---|---|---|---|
| 2009 | 23,173 | 23,236 | 46,409 | —N/a |
| 2010 | 23,355 ▲ | 23,352 ▲ | 46,707 ▲ | +0.64% ▲ |
| 2011 | 22,956 ▼ | 23,238 ▼ | 46,194 ▼ | -1.11% ▼ |
| 2012 | 23,213 ▲ | 23,478 ▲ | 46,691 ▲ | +1.06% ▲ |
| 2013 | 23,662 ▲ | 23,846 ▲ | 47,508 ▲ | +1.72% ▲ |
| 2014 | 23,893 ▲ | 24,067 ▲ | 47,960 ▲ | +0.94% ▼ |
| 2015 | 24,129 ▲ | 24,298 ▲ | 48,427 ▲ | +0.96% ▲ |
| 2016 | 24,263 ▲ | 24,537 ▲ | 48,800 ▲ | +0.76% ▼ |
| 2017 | 24,400 ▲ | 24,684 ▲ | 49,084 ▲ | +0.58% ▼ |
| 2018 | 24,708 ▲ | 24,897 ▲ | 49,605 ▲ | +1.05% ▲ |
| 2019 | 25,018 ▲ | 25,129 ▲ | 50,147 ▲ | +1.08% ▲ |
| 2020 | 25,182 ▲ | 25,302 ▲ | 50,484 ▲ | +0.67% ▼ |
| 2021 | 25,295 ▲ | 25,382 ▲ | 50,677 ▲ | +0.38% ▼ |
| 2022 | 25,409 ▲ | 25,485 ▲ | 50,894 ▲ | +0.43% ▲ |
| 2023 | 25,462 ▲ | 25,489 ▲ | 50,951 ▲ | +0.11% ▼ |
| 2024 | 25,559 ▲ | 25,627 ▲ | 51,186 ▲ | +0.46% ▲ |
| 2025 | 25,653 ▲ | 25,668 ▲ | 51,321 ▲ | +0.26% ▼ |
| 2026 | —N/a | —N/a | 51,487 ▲ | +0.32% ▲ |
Source: DGCS

== See also ==
- Hadath el Jebbeh#Jebbeh for the meaning of Jebbeh, Jebbet
