= Tourza =

Village in Bsharri District, Lebanon

Tourza طورزا
- Municipality
- Location within Lebanon
- Coordinates: 34.2829326°N 35.8980341°E
- Country: Lebanon
- Governorate: North Governorate
- District: Bsharri District
- Elevation: 680 m (2,230 ft)
- Time zone: UTC+2 (EET)
  - Summer (DST): UTC+3 (EEST)
- Dialing code: +06

Tourza (Arabic: طورزا, romanized: Ṭūrzā) is a municipality in the Bsharri District, North Governorate of Lebanon. The village is located near the towns of Mazraat En Nahr and Aabdine. The municipality is member of Federation of Bcharreh District Municipalities. In 2009, there were 2,194 voters in the town and that number rose to 2,220 in 2014. The town has one public and one private school, with approximately 317 students in the town.

== Geography ==
Tourza lies on the entrance of the sacred valley of Kadisha .It is one of the first villages in Bsharri District, located 20 km from Tripoli. It is 700 meters above sea level . The village's area is about 430 hecters or 4,300,000 meters squares.

== History ==
Tourza's history dates back to ancient times, notably during the Phoenician age around 3000 B.C. The village, inhabited by various peoples, notably the Phoenicians, boasts remnants of this era. Among the most significant is the Sabeh Grotto, serving as a burial site for Phoenician kings. Situated on the western side of the village, these caves stand as a testament to Tourza's ancient heritage.

Evidence from the Roman period indicates Tourza's significance as a stop along the empire's roads. A rock found within the village's woods attests to this, suggesting that Tourza was inhabited during Roman times. Additionally, the story of St. Marina, likely from the 4th and 5th centuries, portrays Tourza as a thriving city during that era.

During the Crusades, Tourza played a notable role. The Crusaders repurposed the Delmaz Grotto into a fortress, later transformed into a monastery known as Al-Ahbaash. However, historical accounts suggest that these monks, known as Al-Ahbaash, had a dual identity, functioning as priests by day and engaging in illicit activities by night. The remnants of Al Delmaz and its surroundings serve as enduring reminders of this period.

Following the Crusades, Tourza attracted settlers due to its fertile land and abundant water sources. However, subsequent invasions saw the suppression of the Maronites, with the introduction of the Shia sect. The Mahfoud family was notable for their ability to integrate with the new rulers. Over time, tensions rose, leading to a revolution led by Youssef el Shahabi and Saad El-Khoury, resulting in the expulsion of the Shia from Bscharri and Ehden in 1777.

In 1767, Prince Youssef granted Tourza to Saad El-Khoury and his descendants, marking the beginning of new waves of immigration to the village. Families sought opportunities in agriculture, with Al Mshour becoming a renowned name. Immigration to South Africa and South America surged, with many returning years later to invest in property. In 1886, a significant dispute arose between Ghandour Saad Beik El Khoury and the villagers, ultimately resolved with the intervention of Al Sheikh Raji Zaiter Elias.

During World War I, Tourza, like many other regions, faced hardships including famine and military service. Post-war, emigration to the USA and Canada peaked, resulting in a significant population decline. Despite this, Tourza contributed notable figures to various fields, including law, medicine, and the clergy, both domestically and internationally.

== Population ==
In present times, Tourza is home to approximately 500 residents residing in around 250 households. However, a significant portion of the village's houses remain unoccupied due to the substantial rate of emigration.

Prior to the onset of the Lebanese Civil War in 1975, Tourza boasted a population of approximately 1200 inhabitants. Despite many emigrants not formally registering their children with Lebanese authorities, it was evident from voter turnout data that around 1922 individuals participated in the elections of the year 2000.

Furthermore, estimations indicate a considerable diaspora from Tourza, with roughly 14,000 immigrants residing in Canada and the USA, 6,000 in Venezuela, and additional populations spread across countries such as Australia, Argentina, Brazil, as well as various European and Arab nations.

In 2014 Christians made up 99.86% of registered voters in Tourza. 97.57% of the voters were Maronite Catholics.
