= Chayna =

Maronite Christian Saint

Mar Chayna
- Born: Abraham possibly Antioch
- Died: possibly somewhere in Syria or Lebanon
- Venerated in: Maronite Church
- Feast: September 15

Saint Chayna (Arabic: مار شَيْنَا, romanized: Mar Chayna), also known as Saint Abraham the Brigand, is a saint in the Maronite Church.

== Hagiography ==
Saint Chayna, whose birth name was Abraham, was originally the leader of a gang of thieves. The gang reached a decision to rob a nunnery and planned to disguise themselves as monks in order to sneak into the convent. Upon entry, the nuns received Chayna and his men with hospitality and washed Chayna's feet as was the custom at the time. Another nun, who was sick and paralyzed, anointed herself with the dirty water used to wash Chayna's feet and was miraculously healed. When Chayna saw this, as well as the righteousness and holiness of the convent, he was moved and immediately touched by grace and decided to repent and give up his old sinful life. Chayna revealed his identity to the nuns and told them his purpose for entering their convent. He revealed his concealed sword and placed it in the hands of the nuns as a sign of his protection of them. Thus, the nuns gave him the name "Chayna", meaning protection. Chayna and his criminal entourage then adopted a life of monasticism and lived the rest of their lives through works of repentance and asceticism. Chayna became the prior to the monastery and converted a large number of pagans, spending the rest of his life guiding others until he peacefully reposed. His feast day lies on the fifteenth of September.

== Poem ==
The Maronite bishop and poet Gabriel ibn al-Qilai recorded a poem dedicated to Saint Chayna. It contains 21 couplets and each verse has 2 hemistiches, of 10 syllables each. It is unknown if the author of the poem is ibn al-Qilai himself or not as he does not take credit for it. It was possibly written by a certain Ḍaw of Lehfed, however, it has been argued whether this refers to ibn al-Qilai's first name before he entered into the clergy or if it was a different author from the same village.

== Churches ==
- Mar Chayna (Saint Abraham the Brigand) church, Qnat, Lebanon. Founded in 1800 on the ruins of a pagan temple.
- The church of St. Chaina, Hardine, Lebanon. Completed in 1884.
