= Qnaywer =

Village in Bsharri District, Lebanon

Qnaiouer قنيور Knaywer
- Village
- Location within Lebanon
- Coordinates: 34°15′4″N 36°0′40″E
- Country: Lebanon
- Governorate: North Governorate
- District: Bsharri District
- Elevation: 1,300 m (4,300 ft)
- Time zone: UTC+2 (EET)
  - Summer (DST): UTC+3 (EEST)
- Website: Town of Qnaiouer

Qnaiouer (Levantine Arabic: قنيور, romanized: Qnaywer), also spelled as Knaywer, or Qnaywer, is a village in the North Governorate of Lebanon. It is located in the Bsharri District about 36 mi (or 58 km) North-East of Beirut, the country's capital. The city is composed mainly of Maronite Catholic people.

== Demographics ==
In 2014 Christians made up 100% of registered voters in Qnaiouer. 93.29% of the voters were Maronite Catholics.

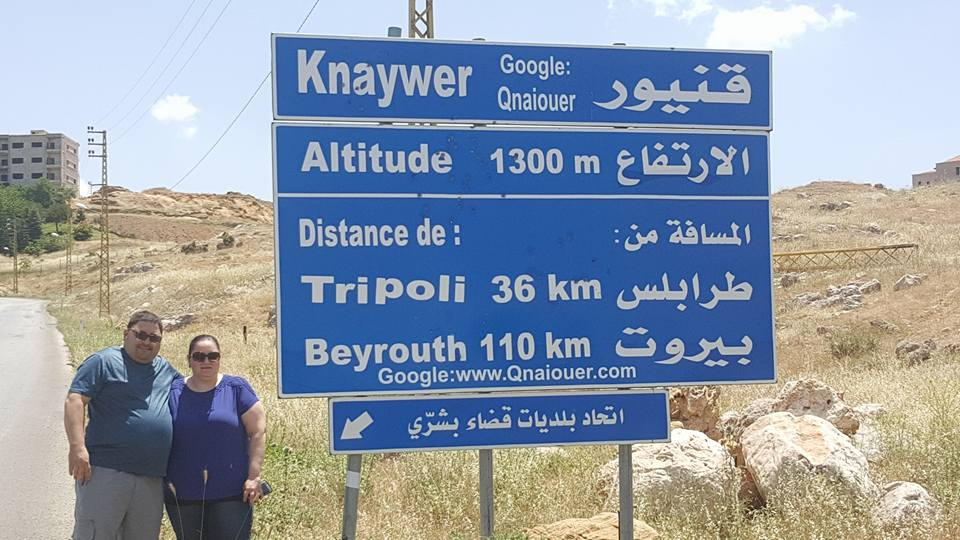
Welcome to Knaywer
