= Beit Minzer =

Village in Bsharri District, Lebanon

Beit Minzer بيت منذر
- Village
- Location within Lebanon
- Coordinates: 34.26°N 35.91219°E
- Country: Lebanon
- Governorate: North Governorate
- District: Bsharri District

Area
  - Total: 2.41 km^{2} (0.93 sq mi)
- Elevation: 1,250 m (4,100 ft)
- Time zone: UTC+2 (EET)
  - Summer (DST): UTC+3 (EEST)
- Dialing code: +06

Beit Minzer (Levantine Arabic: بيت منذر, romanized: Beit Minzer), also spelled Beit Menzer or Beit Monzer, is a Maronite village in the Bsharri District, in the North Governorate of Lebanon. In 2009, the town had 384 voters, in 2014 the town has 408 voters, 210 males and 198 females and in 2017, the town had 431 voters. The town has a volleyball team, founded in 1970 called the Al-Nahda club. The team finished runner up in the Independence Tournament of 1974 and won the North Governorate championship that year as well. In 2004, they finished third in the Lebanese championship in the second division and in 2017, they finished second in the Lebanese championship in the third division.

== Delmass Grotto ==
The Delmass Grotto (also Delmas) is a large cave that was fortified in the 13th or 14th century. The grotto is located on a 100 ft tall cliff known as Sheer El Delmas or Delmaz. The cave is located along an ancient trade and caravan road that connected the Lebanese coast to Bekaa valley and Damascus. A popular legend is that the cave was once inhabited by criminals who acted as monks during the day. The grotto is located in the Qadisha Valley, a UNESCO World Heritage site.

== Demographics ==
In 2014 Christians made up 98.28% of registered voters in Beit Minzer. 92.89% of the voters were Maronite Catholics.
