= Delmass Cave =

Cave with medieval military fortifications in Lebanon

Demlass Cave مغارة الدلماس
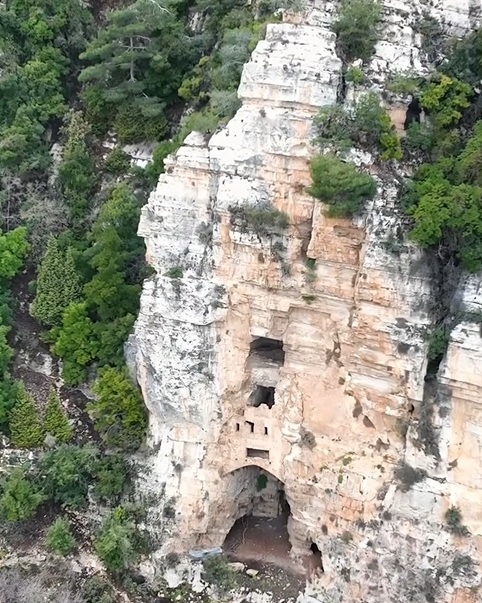
- Aerial view of the entrance of the Delmass Cave
- Interactive map of Demlass Cave مغارة الدلماس
- Location: Beit Minzer, Lebanon
- Coordinates: 34.2657011816565°N 35.899808758716865°E
- Length: 30 metres (98 ft)
- Geology: Calcitic-dolomitic
- Entrances: 2
- Difficulty: none

The Delmass Cave (also Dalmas Cave/grotto; Arabic: مغارة الدلماس, romanized: Magharat al-Dalmas) is a natural rock shelter high on a cliff above the village of Beit Minzer in northern Lebanon, on the outskirts of the Qadisha Valley. The cave contains the remains of a multi-level fortified structure built into the rock. Archaeological investigations in 1995 by the Lebanese speleological society Groupe d'Etudes et de Recherches Souterraines du Liban (GERSL) dated the fortifications to the late medieval period in the 13th–14th centuries. The cave overlooks the former caravan route between Tripoli, Baalbek and Damascus. Scholars interpreted the remains as those of a late medieval military or lookout post. It is noted as the only surviving medieval military site in the Jebbet Bsharri region of the Qadisha highlands.

== History and excavation ==
The site overlooks an old caravan road that once linked the coastal city of Tripoli to Baalbek and Damascus, and was likely used as a Mamluk-era fortified lookout or military outpost. In 1477, Sultan Al-Ashraf Qaitbay used the road under the cave on his way from Baalbek to Tripoli. The cave was explored in 1995 by the Lebanese speleological society Groupe d'Etudes et de Recherches Souterraines du Liban (GERSL), headed by Fadi Baroudi and the findings were published in Liban Souterrain in 1998. The expedition reported that the cave’s architecture and artifacts indicate a late medieval occupation: painted ceramic shards, a carved wooden comb, iron arrowheads, and fragments of cloth, including a striped fabric, were found and dated to the 13th–14th century AD. The cave’s ruins were documented with detailed plans and descriptions, and the site has been referred to in publications as "Magharat Delmass" or "the Greater Delmass cave", in reference to another smaller fortified grotto lies a few hundred meters west. The preliminary survey linked the site to a small local garrison or postal party in the late medieval period.

== Description ==
The Delmass site features the larger "Greater Cave" and a smaller one, "Lesser Cave", which lies a few hundred meters to the west. The Greater Cave, locally known as Shir ad-Delmass or ad-Dalmaz, sits at about 1,200 meters (3,900 ft) above sea level on a limestone cliff roughly 100 meters (330 ft) tall. Its entrance is a broad, triangular, natural opening about 30 meters (98 ft) high and facing northeast. Inside, a natural passageway approximately 30 meters (98 ft) long leads into various chambers and room-like cavities. At the center there is a multi-level man-made structure, and stone stairways carved into the surrounding rock.

=== Cave façade ===
The surviving multi-story entrance façade is about 14 meters (46 ft) tall, and rests on a wide segmental arch of ashlar stone. This façade and the adjoining walls are built of dressed calcitic–dolomitic limestone blocks set in lime mortar. The rock above and beside the structure bears beam holes and carved steps, indicating that wooden floors and stairways once spanned the cleft. The façade has several windows and openings on multiple levels. The first level features a large rectangular window, about 3 m wide and 1 m high, with its lower edge aligned with the floor of the main interior hall. The second level has a small arrowslit above the first window. The third level contains three equally sized windows, while the fourth level has another arrowslit. The top level of the façade has completely collapsed.

=== Interior and built structure ===
The internal construction of the cave includes a large 6-meter-high (20 ft) hall with a tiled floor built on top of a vault. The stone walls form the sides of the hall, and a natural rock cavity above serves as the ceiling. Access to the hall was via a staircase carved into the rock, with evidence of wooden beams visible in square holes in the walls. The arrangement of windows and openings suggests that the hall may have had two or more floors. Above the hall, approximately 3 meters (9.8 ft) from its ceiling, is a rectangular upper chamber carved mostly in the rock, with vertical walls and a flat ceiling. The surfaces are covered with blackened plaster. A 1 meter (3.3 ft) diameter oven, alongside fragments of 13th–14th century pottery, an iron arrowhead, a notched fragment of wood, and cloth fragments, including a ribbed textile known as "attabi" were found in the southern corner of this chamber.

Other cave structures include a water reservoir and a series of small rock-cut rooms. The reservoir is partly carved from the rock and partly built with roughly hewn stones, with a cylindrical vaulted roof and a central opening. A small upper chamber, about 5 meters (16 ft) above the reservoir ceiling, collected rainwater through channels carved into the rock. Of the rock-cut rooms, two remain in good condition at the end of the passage, closed with walls made of hewn stones.

== Access and conservation ==
The Delmass Cave is the only military site dating back to the late Middle Ages remaining in Jebbet Bsharri. It lies at the outskirts of the protected Qadisha Valley, a UNESCO World Heritage Site since 1998. During evaluations by UNESCO experts regarding the designation of the Qadisha valley as a World Heritage Site, documentation of the cave was presented to illustrate the region’s cultural significance. This material contributed to the delegation’s decision to conduct a field visit to the valley. Although the Delmass cave played a role in supporting Qadisha’s successful inscription, it was not included in the official World Heritage listing because it lies outside the designated boundaries of the Qadisha valley site. Today, the Delmass cave is not developed as a show cave or public tourist site, and it is reached only via hiking trails. The nearest access is from the village of Beit Minzer or nearby hamlets, with one old mule track that passes directly under the cave entrance.

== Attribution and local lore ==
Local tradition associates the name "Delmass" with the province of Dalmatia in the Balkans, suggesting that the cave may have been inhabited by monks from that region who came to practice asceticism in the Qadisha Valley, as did other monastic communities. Folk legends about "bandit-monks of Delmass", thieves posing as hermits, persist in local oral history, though these are not confirmed by the physical evidence. Folk stories tell that these monks would shoe their horses backwards to mislead anyone tracking them. Local tradition holds that during the Crusader period (12th–13th centuries) the cave was used as a fortified outpost or "hanging castle" overlooking the valley, and some accounts claim Crusaders even converted it into a small fortress. However, no contemporary Crusader or Mamluk documents explicitly name Delmass. Other sources like the Lebanese scholar Pierre Abi Aoun believe the cave fortifications were built by Sultan Baybars after the 1268 campaign in Mount Lebanon. Abi Aoun attributed the fortifications to Baybars, proposing that the cave may have served as a relay post controlling the caravan route. He noted that its distance from Tripoli corresponded approximately to a day's journey, which he compared with the spacing of postal relays in medieval communication networks.
