= Bekaa Kafra =

Village in Bsharri District, Lebanon

Bekaa Kafra بقاع كفرا
- Village
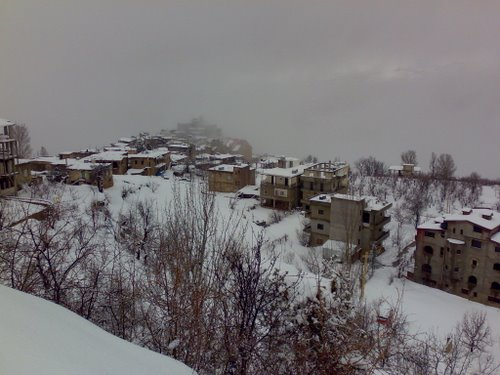
- Bekaa Kafra in Winter

- Location within Lebanon
- Coordinates: 34°14′25.1″N 36°00′09.6″E
- Country: Lebanon
- Governorate: North Governorate
- District: Bsharri District
- Elevation: 1,800 m (5,900 ft)
- Highest elevation: 2,750 m (9,020 ft)
- Lowest elevation: 1,500 m (4,900 ft)
- Time zone: UTC+2 (EET)
  - Summer (DST): UTC+3 (EEST)
- Dialing code: +961

Bekaa Kafra (Arabic: بقاع كفرا, romanized: Bekāʿ Kafrā) is a Lebanese village located in the Bsharri District in Northern Lebanon. Bekaa Kafra is located above the village of Bsharri across the Kadisha Valley. It is the birth town of Saint Charbel. Bekaa Kafra has an altitude ranging from 1500 m to 2750 m at its highest point, making it the highest village in Lebanon and in the Middle East.

== Etymology ==
The village name origins are of Syriac language, meaning "Fertile land".

== Demographics ==
In 2014 Christians made up 99.34% of registered voters in Bekaa Kafra. 94.48% of the voters were Maronite Catholics.

== Climate ==
Bekaa Kafra has a temperate climate with warm, dry summers and cold, snowy winters. It is cold in winter for two reasons: Its location in Northern Lebanon, and its high altitude. Temperatures in winter average around 0 °C and can reach −10 °C to −30 °C. Temperatures in summer average around 18 °C, but they may reach 20 °C to 25 °C in July and August, but can also drop to as low as 6 °C at night. Snow in winter can accumulate up to 6 meters and occasionally more.

== Position ==
Bekaa Kafra is among the claimants to the status of highest village in Lebanon and the Middle East. Most of its settled is situated approximately 1700 to 2000 meters above sea level.
