= Aabdine =

Village in Bsharri District, Lebanon

Aabdine عبدين
- Village
- Location within Lebanon
- Coordinates: 34.2744752°N 35.88889°E
- Country: Lebanon
- Governorate: North Governorate
- District: Bsharri District
- Elevation: 960 m (3,150 ft)
- Time zone: UTC+2 (EET)
  - Summer (DST): UTC+3 (EEST)
- Dialing code: +06

Aabdine (Arabic: عبدين, romanized: ʿAbdīn), also spelled Abdine, or Abdeen, is a village in the Bsharri District, in the North Governorate of Lebanon. The village is located near the towns of Billa, Lebanon and Tourza. In 2009, there were 870 voters in the town and there were 944 voters in the year 2014 with 474 females and 470 males. The town has one public and one private school, with approximately 151 students in the town.

== Demographics ==
In 2014 Christians made up 99.68% of registered voters in Aabdine. 95.55% of the voters were Maronite Catholics.
