= Medal of Saint Charbel =

Catholic sacramental medal in honor of Saint Charbel Makhlouf

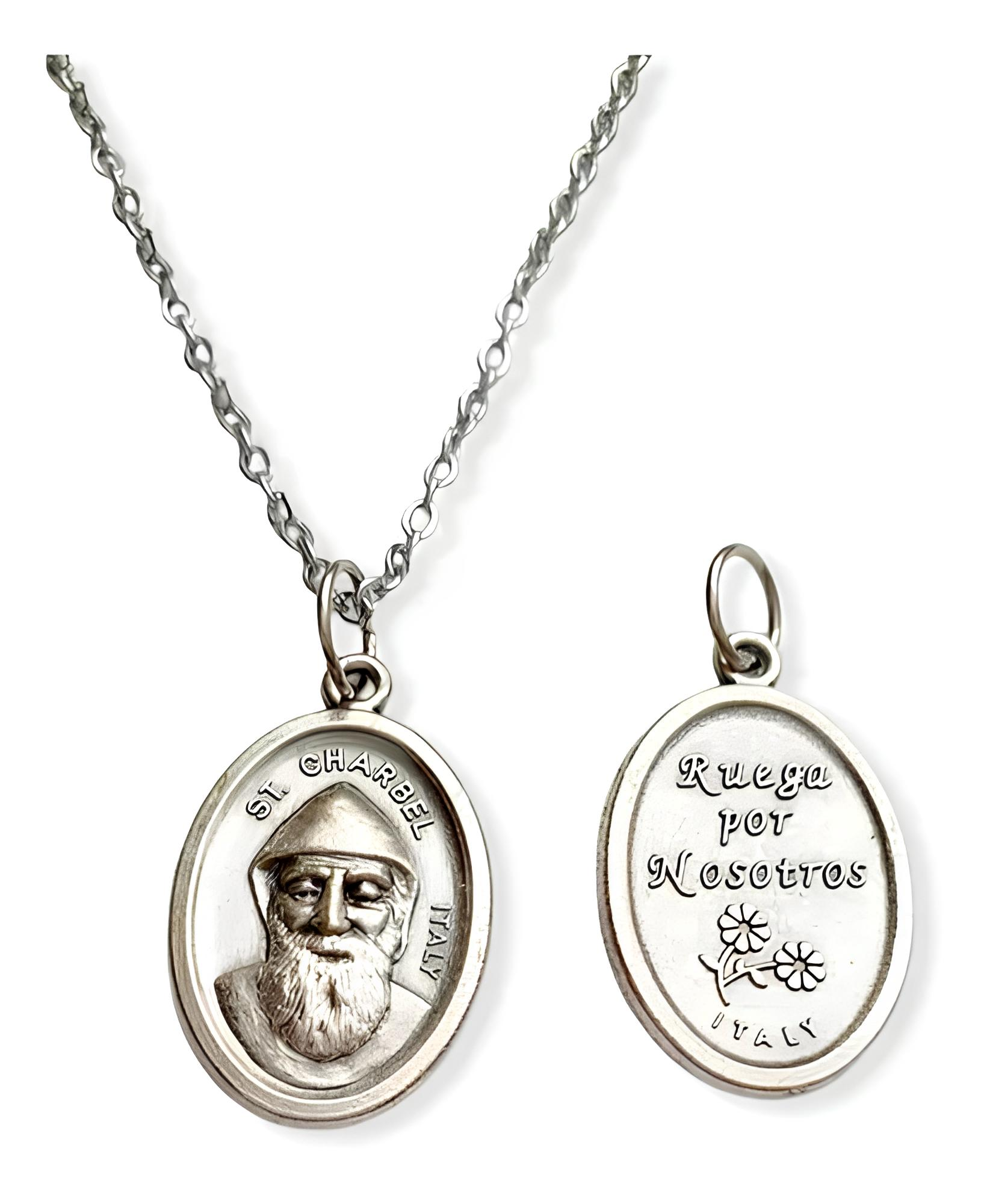
Medal of Saint Charbel, Spanish version.

The Medal of Saint Charbel is a Catholic sacramental medal designed in honor of Saint Charbel Makhlouf, a Lebanese Maronite monk who lived in the 19th century and was canonized on October 9, 1977, by Pope Paul VI. Saint Charbel is recognized for his deep devotion to God and the numerous miracles attributed to his intercession, especially in difficult causes and illnesses.

This medal is considered a symbol of protection, healing, and peace. Many faithful carry it as a way to remember God's love and seek his protection and help in times of need.

== Description ==
The medal of Saint Charbel has the image of the saint on the front and on the back a text that says “Pray for us” with one or two small flowers below it.

== See also ==
- Medal of Saint Benedict
- Miraculous Medal
