= Bazoun =

Maronite village in Bsharri District, Lebanon

Bazoun بزعون
- Village
- Location within Lebanon
- Coordinates: 34.2414071°N 35.9874816°E
- Country: Lebanon
- Governorate: North Governorate
- District: Bsharri District

Area
  - Total: 2.27 km^{2} (0.88 sq mi)
- Elevation: 1,390 m (4,560 ft)
- Time zone: UTC+2 (EET)
  - Summer (DST): UTC+3 (EEST)
- Dialing code: +06

Bazoun (Arabic: بزعون, romanized: Bazʿūn), also spelled Bazaoun or Bazaaoun, is a Maronite village and municipality in the Bsharri District of Lebanon. Oral tradition has it that the first Lebanese settler in Guadeloupe was someone from the Debs family in Bazoun who went there in 1870. There are 4 schools in the town, 3 public and 1 private, with almost 850 students in total attending.

== Demographics ==
In 2014 Christians made up 98.96% of registered voters in Bazoun. 93.79% of the voters were Maronite Catholics.
