= Charbel Makhlouf =

19th-century Lebanese Maronite monk and saint (1828–1898)

Saint Charbel Makhlouf O.L.M.
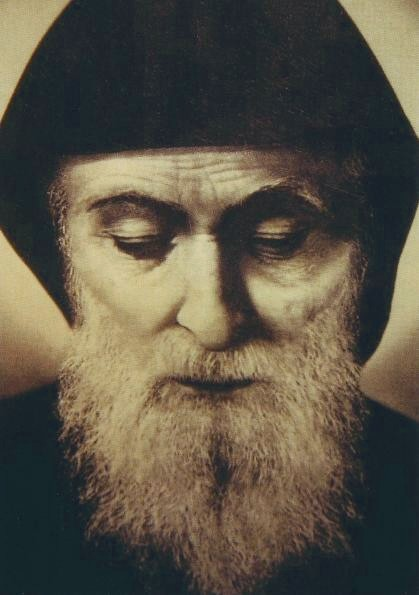
- Portrait of Saint Charbel Makhlouf

Priest, Religious and Wonderworker
- Born: May 8, 1828; Bekaa Kafra, Mount Lebanon
- Died: December 24, 1898 (aged 70); Monastery of Saint Maron, Mount Lebanon
- Venerated in: Catholic Church (especially Maronite Church)
- Beatified: December 5, 1965, Saint Peter's Basilica, Vatican City by Pope Paul VI
- Canonized: October 9, 1977, Saint Peter's Basilica, Vatican City by Pope Paul VI
- Major shrine: Monastery of Saint Maron; Annaya, Byblos District, Lebanon
- Feast: 3rd Sunday in July (Maronite Calendar); July 24 (Roman Calendar)
- Attributes: Religious habit Prayer rope
- Patronage: Lebanon

Charbel Makhlouf, O.L.M. (born Youssef Antoun Makhlouf; Arabic: شربل مخلوف, romanized: Sharbil Makhlūf, Syriac: ܡܪܝ ܫܪܒܠ) May 8, 1828 – December 24, 1898) was a Lebanese Maronite monk and priest. During his life, he obtained a wide reputation for holiness, and for his ability to unite Christians, Muslims and Druze. He was a member of the Baladites.

He is known among Lebanese Christians as the "Miracle Monk of Lebanon" because of the favours reportedly received through his intercession, especially after prayers are said at his tomb in the Monastery of Saint Maron in Annaya, Lebanon. He was beatified in 1965 and canonized in 1977 by Pope Paul VI. His feast is celebrated on July 24 by the Latin Church, and on the third Sunday of July by the Maronite Church. The Medal of Saint Charbel was created in his honor.

== Life ==
=== Early life ===
Youssef Antoun Makhlouf was born on May 8, 1828, one of five children, in the mountain village of Bekaa Kafra, the highest by elevation in Lebanon. His father, Antoun Zaarour Makhlouf, was a mule driver who died in August 1831 while returning from corvée for the Turkish army, leaving his wife Brigitta (née Chidiac) a widow to care for their children. She remarried a man who went on to Holy Orders and became the parish priest of Bekaa Kafra.

Makhlouf was raised in this pious home, and became drawn to the lives of the saints and the eremitical life practiced by two of his uncles. As a young boy, he was responsible for the family's small herd of cows. He would take the herd to a nearby grotto, where he had enshrined an icon of the Blessed Virgin Mary. He would spend the day in prayer.

=== Monk ===
In 1851, Makhlouf left his family to begin training as a monk of the Lebanese Maronite Order at the Monastery of Our Lady in Mayfouq. He later transferred to the Monastery of Saint Maron in Annaya, in the mountains of Byblos District. Here, he received his habit and took the religious name Charbel, after the 2nd-century Christian martyr of Antioch. He made his final religious profession in the Order on November 1, 1853.

As a young monk, Makhlouf began to prepare himself for ordination by studying philosophy and theology at the Monastery of Saints Cyprian and Justina in Kfifan, Batroun District. Among his professors at the seminary was Nimatullah Kassab, who was himself later also declared a saint. He was ordained six years later, on July 23, 1859, in Bkerke. Charbel was then sent back to the Monastery of Saint Maron, where he lived a life of severe asceticism.

=== Eremitical life ===
In 1875, Charbel was granted by the abbot of the monastery the privilege of living as a hermit at the Hermitage of Saints Peter and Paul, a chapel under the care of the monastery. He spent the next 23 years living with other hermits until his death from a stroke on December 24, 1898.

== Death and relics ==
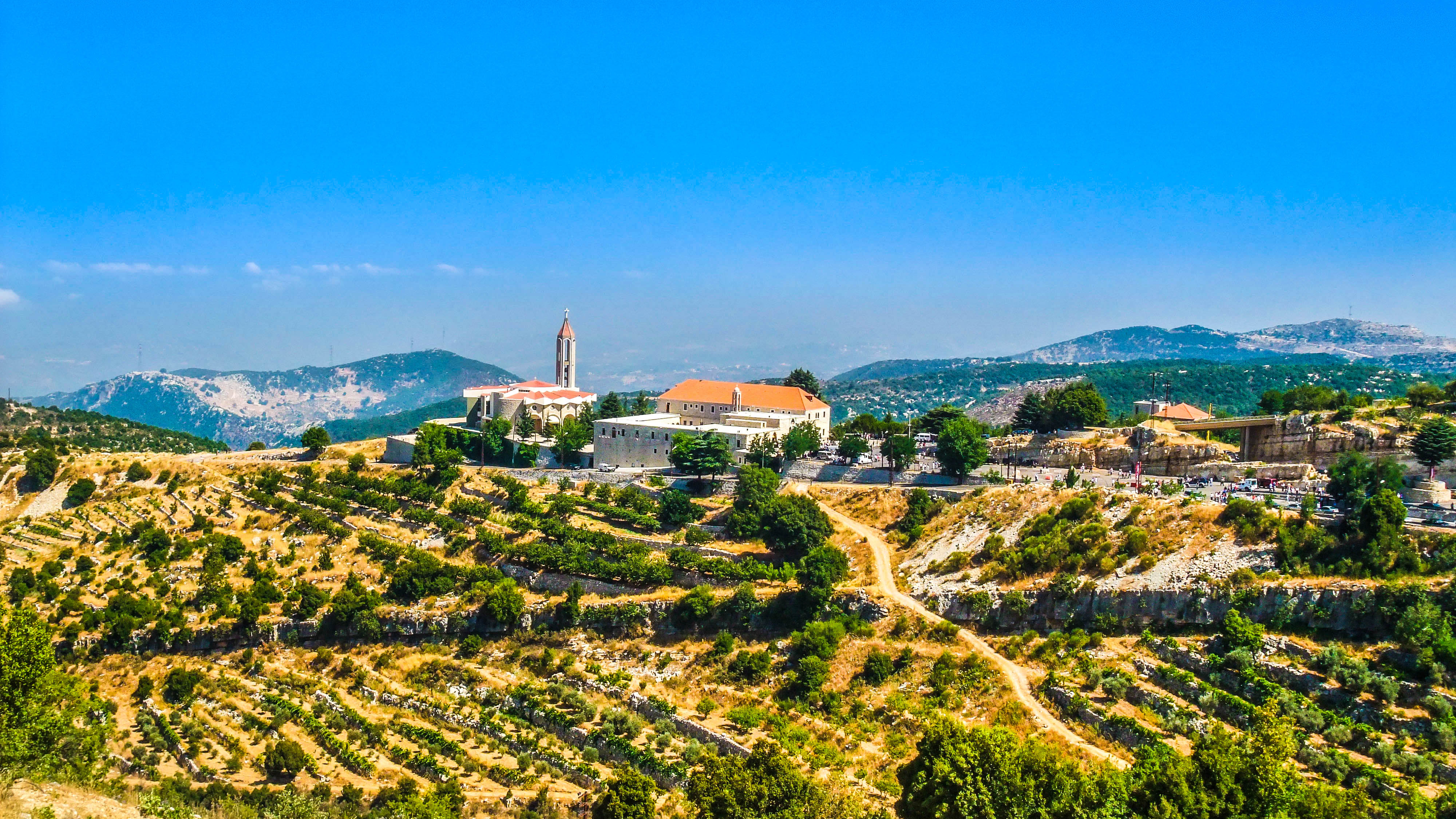
The Monastery of Saint Maron (also known as Sanctuary of Saint Charbel) in Annaya, Lebanon

Makhlouf was interred at the Monastery of Saint Maron on Christmas Day that year. It was reported that during the transport of his corpse, inclement weather conditions hindered the pallbearers in carrying out their duty.

"Father Charbel died on the eve of Christmas; the snow was heavy. We transferred him to the monastery on Christmas Day. Before we moved him, the snow was falling rapidly and the clouds were very dark. When we carried him, the clouds disappeared, and the weather cleared." – George Emmanuel Abi-Saseen, one of the pallbearers

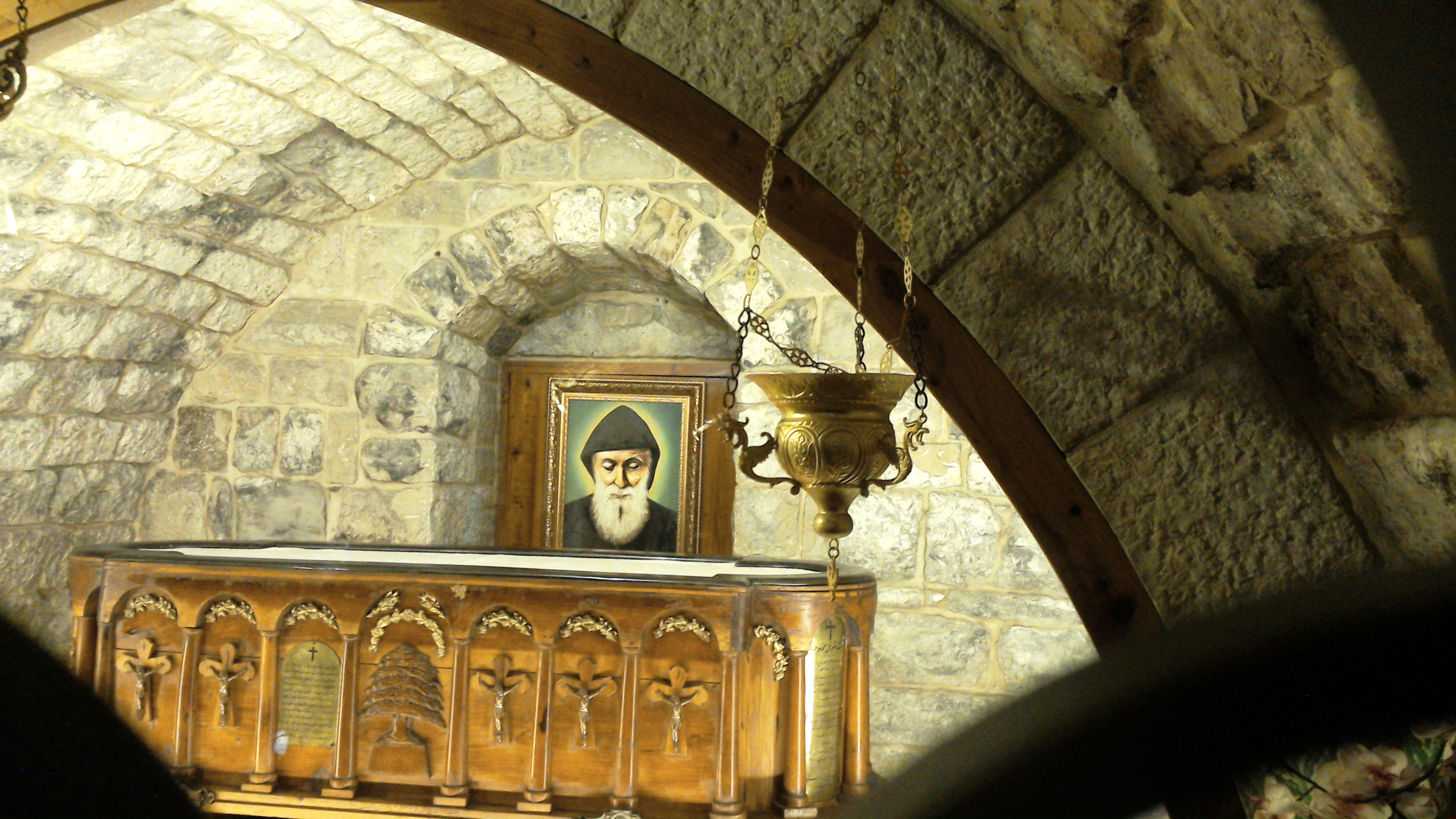
Tomb of Saint Charbel in Annaya, Lebanon

One story claims: "A few months after his death, a bright light was seen surrounding his tomb and the superiors opened it to find his body still intact. After that day, a blood-like liquid flowed from his body. Experts and doctors were unable to give medical explanations for the incorruptibility and flexibility." In 1950 and 1952, his tomb was opened and his body still had the appearance of a living one. Additionally, the 1950 television tape of his exhumation showed Makhlouf's body as still intact, despite the grave having become severely rusty. The official site mentions: In this century his grave has been opened four times, the last time being in 1955, and each time "it has been noticed that his bleeding body still has its flexibility as if it were alive". The Catholic Tradition website says: "Father Joseph Mahfouz, the postulator of the cause, certified that in 1965 the body of Saint Charbel was still preserved intact with no alteration. In 1976, he again witnessed the opening of the grave; this time the body was completely decomposed. Only the skeleton remained."

On September 2, 2017, Saint Charbel's relics were translated to Saint Elisabeth Cathedral in Košice, Slovakia, where a monthly pilgrimage is held, called "Púť k sv. Šarbelovi" (Pilgrimage to St. Charbel). The cathedral is the first in Slovakia to receive his official relics from Lebanon, and attracts pilgrims from across the country as well as neighbouring states like Poland, Ukraine and Czech Republic.

On December 1, 2025 Pope Leo XIV visited the tomb of Saint Charbel at the Monastery of Saint Maroun. He stated that he entrusted "Lebanon and its people to the protection of Saint Charbel, that they may always walk in the light of Christ. Let us thank God for the gift of Saint Charbel! And thank you for preserving his memory. Walk in the light of the Lord!”

== Veneration ==
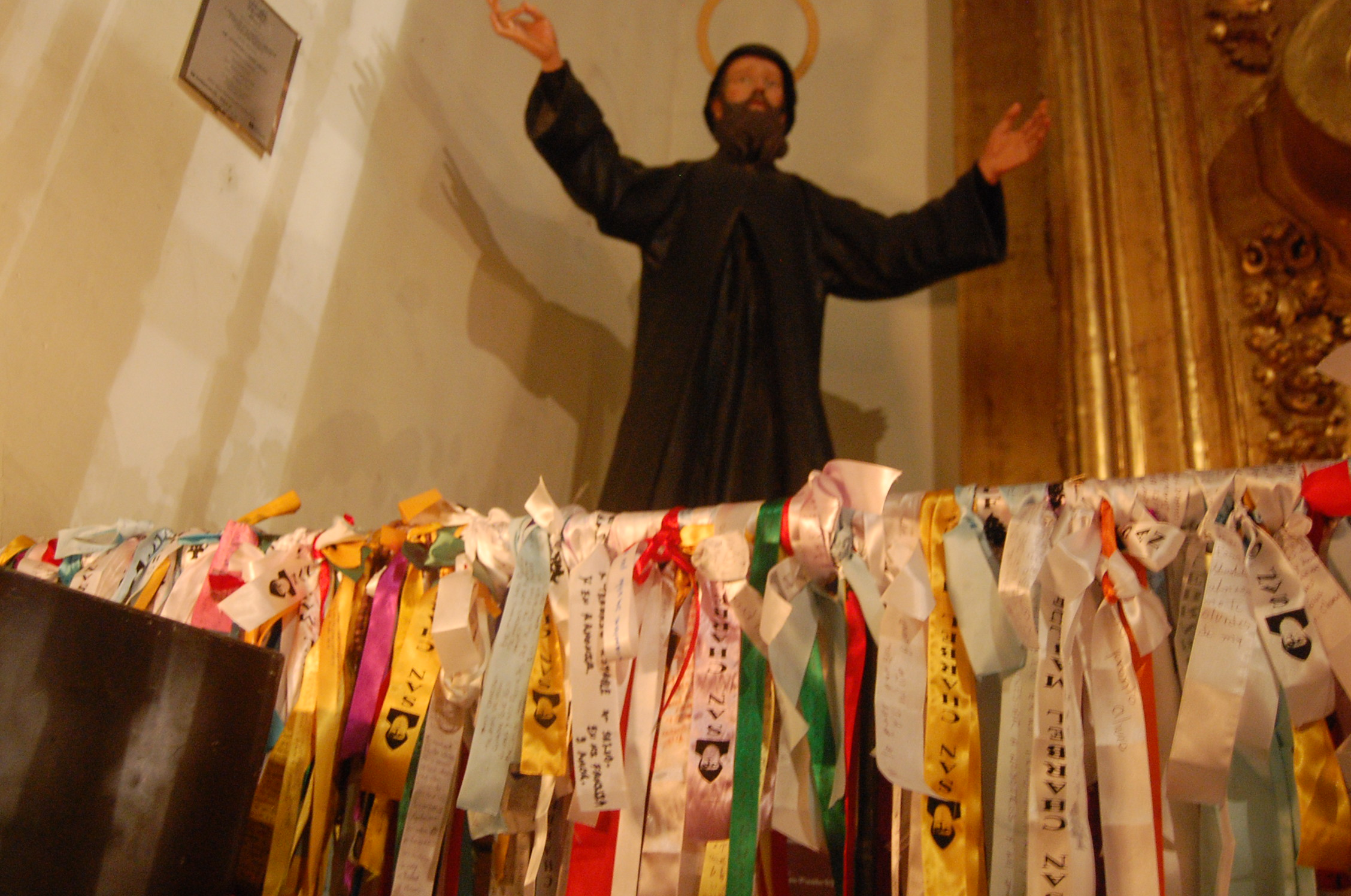
Statue with prayer requests at the Mexico City Metropolitan Cathedral

The cause for Makhlouf's beatification was formally opened on April 4, 1929, and he was granted the title Servant of God. On December 5, 1965, Pope Paul VI presided over his beatification at the conclusion of the Second Vatican Council. The pope said: “A hermit of Mount Lebanon is enrolled in the number of the blessed… a new eminent member of monastic sanctity has by his example and his intercession enriched the entire Christian people … may he make us understand, in a world largely fascinated by wealth and comfort, the paramount value of poverty, penance and asceticism, to liberate the soul in its ascent to God.”

On October 9, 1977, the pontiff canonized Makhlouf. At the time, Bishop Francis Zayek wrote, “St. Sharbel is called the second St. Anthony of the Desert, the Perfume of Lebanon, the first Confessor of the East to be raised to the Altars according to the actual procedure of the Catholic Church, the honor of our Aramaic Antiochian Church, and the model of spiritual values and renewal. Sharbel is like a Cedar of Lebanon standing in eternal prayer, on top of a mountain.” Reflecting on the canonization of Makhlouf and the causes for canonization of other Maronites active at the time, Zayek further proclaimed “the Aramaic Maronite Antiochian Church is indeed a living branch of the Catholic Church and is intimately connected with the trunk, who is Christ, our Savior, the beginning and the end of all things.”

Chapel dedicated to Saint Charbel in the Church of Saint Martin in Aniche, France

Owing to his role as a Maronite Saint as well as his piety and morals, Makhlouf serves as a role model for many Maronite Catholics and is venerated by Catholics from all sui iuris churches in communion with Rome.

On October 28, 2017, a shrine dedicated to Makhlouf was inaugurated at Saint Patrick's Cathedral in New York City. The Lebanese Maronite Patriarch, Bechara Boutros al-Rahi, attended the inauguration ceremony giving his blessing and a dedication, as well as Cardinal Timothy M. Dolan. The shrine has a mosaic of Makhlouf along with national emblems of Lebanon such as the cedar and a relic of Makhlouf. It was donated by SGBL Bank chairman Antoun Sehnaoui in the name of his parents, May and Nabil Sehnaoui.

== Feast Day ==
- 3rd Sunday in July – main commemoration Maronites,
- July 23– main commemoration (Lebanon),
- July 24 – optional memorial, Roman Catholic Church
- July 28 – commemoration in Poland, (July 24 – commemoration of Saint Kinga),
- December 24 – commemoration of death anniversary,

== Miracles ==
Among the many miracles attributed to Makhlouf, the Catholic Church chose two to confirm his beatification, and a third for his canonization:

- the healing of Sister Mary Abel Kamari of the Sacred Hearts;
- the healing of Iskandar Naim Obeid from Baabdat;
- the healing of Rached Salim Zoorob from Alma El Chaab;
- the healing of Mariam Awad from Hammana.

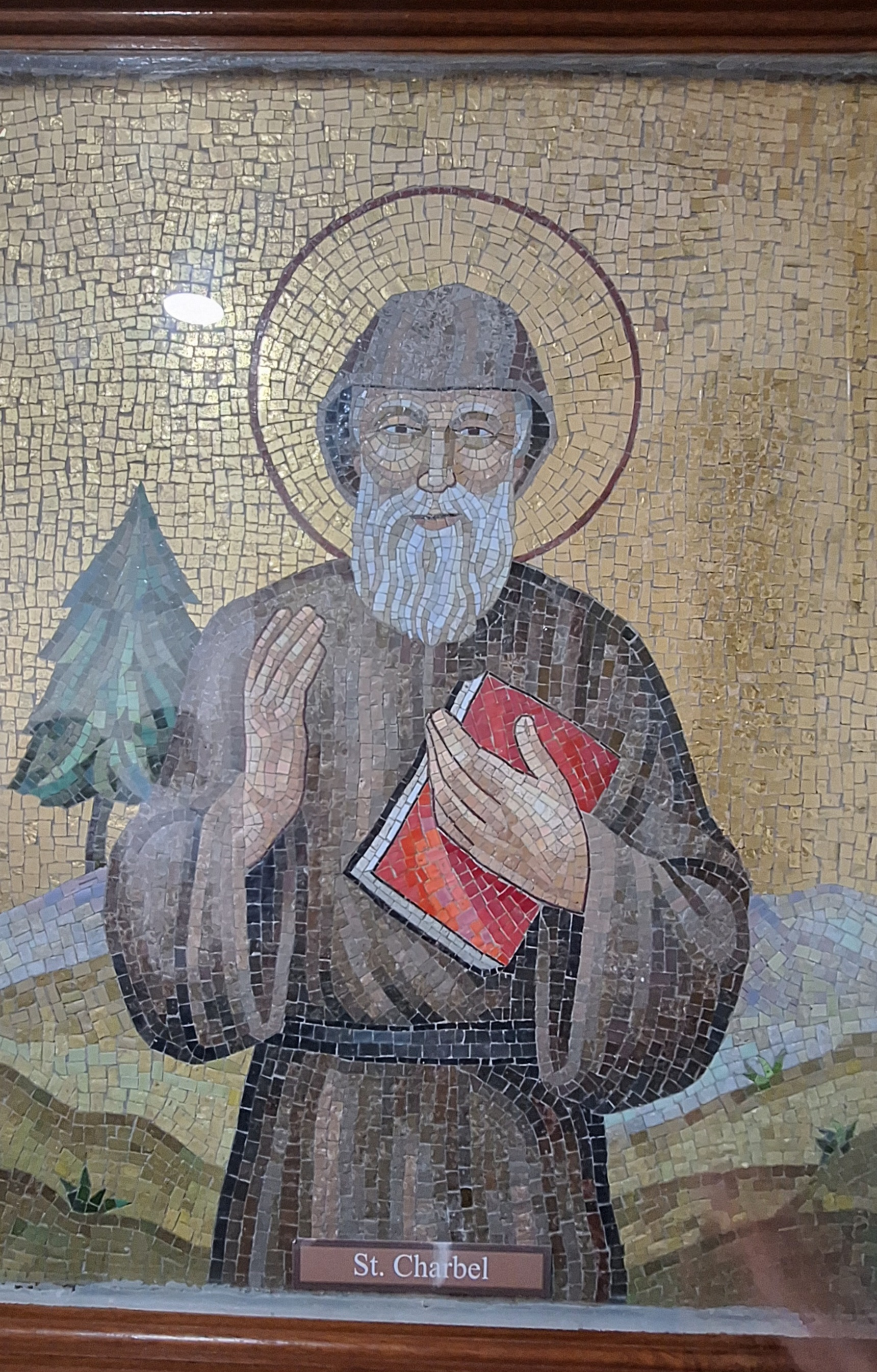
A mosaic portrait of Charbel at St. Mary's Catholic Church, Dubai.

A great number of other miracles have been attributed to Makhlouf since his death. The most famous is that of Nohad El Shami, a 55-year-old woman at the time of the miracle who was healed from partial paralysis. She tells that on the night of January 22, 1993, she dreamt of two Maronite monks standing next to her bed. One put his hands on her neck and operated on her, relieving her from her pain, while the other held a pillow behind her back. When she awoke, she found two wounds in her neck, one on each side. She was completely healed and recovered her ability to walk. She believed it was the saint who healed her, but did not recognize the other monk. The next night, she dreamt of Makhlouf, who said: "I did the surgery to let people see and return to faith. I ask you to visit the hermitage on the 22nd of every month, and attend Mass regularly for the rest of your life”. People now gather on the 22nd of each month to pray and attend Mass in the hermitage of Saint Charbel in Annaya.

In 1994, a Lebanese Maronite Catholic named Raymond Nader was praying at the hermitage in Annaya when he had a mystical experience. “I found myself in another world…I saw a strange and amazing Light unlike any light I had ever seen; it was a sea of light that extended from one end of the universe to the other. I wanted that Light to stay permanently.” After the vision, Nader was leaving when his arm felt hot and itchy near the statue of Saint Charbel. When he rolled up his sleeve in his car, he saw the imprint of five fingers. “They were engraved like a hand on my arm and encircled by a red glare as if imprinted through fire. But I felt nothing but warmth.”

Dr. Nabil Hokayem, a plastic surgeon from Beirut, examined the mark and believed it was a third-degree burn. The mark has since repeatedly faded and returned. Inspired by his experience, in 1995 Nader began a prayer group called the Family of Saint Sharbel. Its mission is “to contribute to the Catholic Church’s evangelizing mission through living the spirituality of Saint Sharbel in the world.” Nader claims Saint Charbel has appeared to him many more times, and 16 of the saint's locutions to Nader have been published.

== See also ==
- List of Catholic saints
- Charbelicaris maronites – a fossil from Lebanon named in honour of Charbel
- Saint Charbel Makhlouf, patron saint archive
