= Barhalyoun =

Town in Bsharri District, Lebanon

Barhalyoun برحليون
- Town
- Location within Lebanon
- Coordinates: 34.2589348°N 35.8761941°E
- Country: Lebanon
- Governorate: North Governorate
- District: Bsharri District
- Elevation: 1,000 m (3,300 ft)
- Highest elevation: 1,225 m (4,019 ft)
- Lowest elevation: 950 m (3,120 ft)

Population
  - Total: 2,000+
- Time zone: UTC+2 (EET)
  - Summer (DST): UTC+3 (EEST)
- Dialing code: +06

Barhalyoun or Barhalioun (Arabic: برحليون, romanized: Barḥalyūn) is a town in the Bsharri District, North Governorate of Lebanon.

== Demographics ==
In 2014 Christians made up 99.51% of registered voters in Barhalyoun. 96.33% of the voters were Maronite Catholics.
