= Qnat =

Municipality in Bsharri District, Lebanon

Qnat قنات
- Municipality
- Location within Lebanon
- Coordinates: 34.253186°N 35.893614°E
- Country: Lebanon
- Governorate: North Governorate
- District: Bsharri District

Government
  - Municipality Head: Dr. Antoine Saade

Area
  - Total: 7.6 km^{2} (2.9 sq mi)
- Elevation: 1,200 m (3,900 ft)
- Highest elevation: 1,450 m (4,760 ft)
- Lowest elevation: 1,137 m (3,730 ft)

Population (2015)Population distributed in Qnat and foreign countries
  - Total: 3,500
  - Density: 460/km^{2} (1,200/sq mi)
- Time zone: UTC+2 (EET)
  - Summer (DST): UTC+3 (EEST)
- Postal code: 3925
- Dialing code: +961 (06)

Qnât, Qnat, Qanat, Knat or Kanat (Arabic: قنات, romanized: Qnāt) is a municipality in the Bsharri District of Lebanon. The village is located just south of a large cliff and near the towns of Mazraat Bani Saab and Hadath El Jebbeh.

The town is a member of the Federation of Municipalities of Bcharreh District. The name of the town comes from the Semitic root word "Qna" meaning ′Good Livelihood", the name was also attributed to the God El, whose Daughter was called the goddess Anat in Greek mythology.

== Etymology ==
As for what was stated in a book by Father Boutros Daou, that the name "Anat" (as we pronounce it today in the Lebanese dialect) is the same as the name of the Heroic Deity "Anat" the Phoenician daughter of the greatest god "El" who was mentioned many times in Ras Shamra "ugarit" tables, also in epics and songs of king Melqart, and the hymn of Aqhat Bin Daniel "Attributes of the Gods Anat, the warrior virgin the goddess of Wisdom, Two queens on two of its hills, each queen facing the other queen, the remains of the palaces are still existing our days at Qnat.

== History ==
On Tuesday, February 12, 1980, following clashes between the Kataeb and the Marada, a Syrian patrol unit entered the town of Qnat and skirmishes then began between the unit and local Phalangist combatants. The patrol unit was helped by Zghortans and the Zghortans helped facilitate their plans. As a result, reinforcements were called in and arrived that night. On the morning of the new day, 11 Lebanese reinforcements also arrived from the Adonis' Defense Units, headed by Hanna Atik, along with 7 elite ″commandos″, led by Suleiman Hoayek.

The following morning, on Saturday, the Lebanese launched a two pronged surprise attack on the Syrians. One group, led by Abou Nader, would attack from Mazraat Bani Saab, and another, led by Samir Geagea, would attack from the town. On Sunday, February 17, the two parties agreed to a ceasefire, and Lebanese fighters withdrew to Bani Saab and Assaf. That evening, as fighters were attempting to withdraw, one of their fighters, Michel Haddad was killed. Syria then threatened to use aerial attacks, putting helicopters on standby at Hamat Airport. The Syrian army eventually gained control of the town, but not before most residents had evacuated. The resistance fighters retreated to the town of Niha, which remained a line of conflict throughout the war. Several thousand civilians were also displaced during the battle and stranded in the cold weather and snow. The battle turned Geagea, the son of a modest family, into a respected leader and a member of Maronite community's new elite. When describing this battle, Sheikh Bachir Gemayel said: "The Battle of Qnat paralleled the Hundred Days’ War in Achrafieh".

== Activities ==
Qnat also has a sports club named CRS QNAT, founded in 1954. main sports are Volleyball and Table Tennis, The club, headed was originally headed by Mr. Mounir Chahine, and later by Mr. Emile Jabbour, and currently by Joseph Mounir Chahine, the Club team has won Lebanon's championship multiple times, including in 2020.

== Demographics ==
In 1953, Qnat had a population of 412 living in 46 households. Qnat has a registered population of around 3,500 with around 1,000 emigrants. Most emigrants travel to Australia, Cuba and there are approximately 120-230 Qnatis there. There are 76 stores in Lebanon with 3 industries. The pay in the village is higher than its neighboring towns, with an income of 30–33 dollars per day. Employment is not good, with 80% of 18-30 year olds unemployed and 95% of people aged 45–60 unemployed. Female employment is also low, with only 14 females employed in the entire village. The town's main export is agricultural products although their economy is declining fast. The town had 1,502 voters in 2014.

Age Distribution in Percentage (%) View chart definition.
Population Distribution in Qnat by age group

Population Distribution in Qnat
	Age 0–17	17-25	25-60	60+
Male	12%	13%	18%	5%
Female	12%	12%	20%	8%
Total	24%	25%	38%	13%

2014 Voter Distribution in Qnat
	20-29	30-39	40-49	50-59	60-69	70-79	80-89	90-99	100-109	Total
Male	90	107	162	113	65	73	78	56	3	747
Female	85	111	150	114	75	84	84	47	5	755
Total	175	218	312	227	140	157	162	103	8	1,502

=== Religion ===
Qnat is predominately Maronite, with Saint Mary of Qnat church being the main, but not only, church in the town. There are many shrines dedicated to saints in the town, such as the Saint Mema shrine. There is also the Saint Michael convent, the Saint Semaan hermitage, the Saint Antonios Al-Badwani shrine, the Shmouneh Lady shrine, and the Saint Takla Shrine in which a spring is found. There is a large two floor cave and monastery in the south of the town dedicated to Saint Challita. There is also a spring named after Saint Challita which provides water for agriculture and which used to provide drinking water before the main water network was installed. There is also a historic Mar Chayna church which was built in 1800 on the remains of a pagan temple. Bishop Francis Baysari of the Eparchy of Jebbe was born in Qnat. A street that connects the public square to the churches was named after him.

Religious Distribution in Qnat
Religion	Number	% of population
Armenian Orthodox	1	0.07
Armenian Catholic	1	0.07
Assyrian	2	0.13
Protestant	0	0.00
Greek Orthodox	66	4.40
Roman Catholic	15	1.00
Syriac Orthodox	3	0.20
Syriac Catholic	2	0.13
Maronite	1,406	94.15
Other Christian	1	0.06
Christian	1,497	99.70
Sunni	0	0.00
Shiite	0	0.00
Alawite	0	0.00
Muslim	0	0.00
Other	5	0.33
Total	1502	100
