= Mazraat Bani Saab =

Village in Bsharri District, Lebanon

Mazraat Bani Saab مزرعة بني صعب
- Village
- Location within Lebanon
- Coordinates: 34.2475076°N 35.8838569°E
- Country: Lebanon
- Governorate: North Governorate
- District: Bsharri District

Area
  - Total: 1.923 km^{2} (0.742 sq mi)
- Elevation: 1,009 m (3,310 ft)

Population (2009)
  - Total: 230
  - Density: 120/km^{2} (310/sq mi)
- Time zone: UTC+2 (EET)
  - Summer (DST): UTC+3 (EEST)
- Dialing code: +06

Mazraat Bani Saab (Arabic: مزرعة بني صعب, romanized: Mazraʿat Banī Ṣaʿb), also spelled Mazraat Abi Saab or Mazraat Beni’ Saab, is a village in the Bsharri District of Lebanon. The village is located near the towns of Qnat and Mazraat Aassaf. The village is designated by the Ministry of Tourism as a protected ecotourism site.

== Population ==
Mazraat Bani Saab has a registered population of 230, with 40 people residing there in winter and 120 in summer. The town has approximately 300 emigrants, and some residents migrate to Australia. The population has stayed relatively low, with little population growth since the 70s.

Population Distribution in Mazraat Bani Saab
	Age 0-17	Age 17-25	Age 25-60	Age 60+
Male	10%	5%	22%	5%
Female	11.6%	6.4%	32%	8%
Total	21.6%	11.4%	54%	13%

== Geography ==
Mazraat Bani Saab is located in an elevated part of Lebanon, near the Kadisha Valley. There is a large cliff to the west of the town that has with a spring called Aïn Karm el Hiddâd.

== Demographics ==
In 2014 Christians made up 98.87% of registered voters in Mazraat Bani Saab. 93.67% of the voters were Maronite Catholics.

== Industry ==
The economy is Mazraat Bani Saab is rapidly declining and according to the residents. Employment is poor in Mazraat Bani Saab, with half of the village unemployed. The other half makes an average of $13-20 dollars per day. Female employment is low, with only 2 females employed in the entire village. The major product in the village is agricultural products, specifically fruit trees. The infrastructure is also poor, with no running water available in the village.
