= List of museums in Lebanon =

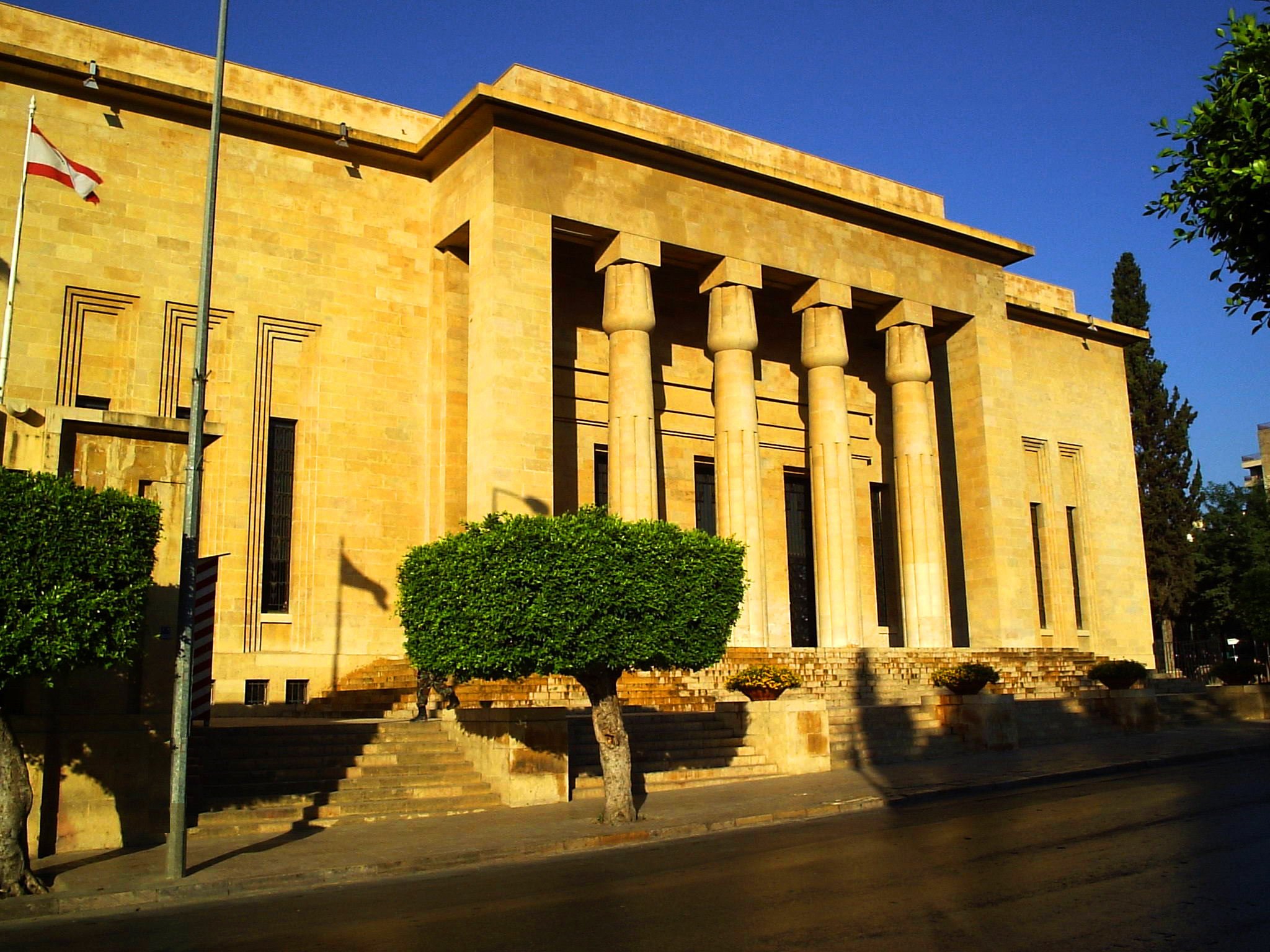
National Museum of Beirut

This is a list of museums in Lebanon.

- Ethnographic Museum of the University of Balamand
- The Cilicia Museum
- Armenian Genocide Orphans'"Aram Bezikian" Museum
- Ameen Rihani Museum
- Archaeological Museum of the American University of Beirut
- Baalbek
- Banque Du Liban Museum
- Beit Beirut
- Beiteddine Palace Museum
- Bsous Silk Museum
- Byblos Fossil Museum
- Byblos Wax Museum
- Château Ksara
- Citadel of Raymond de Saint-Gilles
- Debbane Palace
- Gibran Museum
- Lebanese Heritage Museum
- Lebanese Marine and Wildlife Museum
- Lebanese Military Museum
- Mim Museum
- Moussa Castle
- Modern And Contemporary Art Museum
- Museum of Lebanese Prehistory
- Nabu Museum
- National Museum of Beirut
- Robert Mouawad Private Museum
- Saint George Greek Orthodox Cathedral Archaeological Crypt Museum
- Sidon Soap Museum
- Sursock Museum
- Tourist Landmark of the Resistance

== See also ==
- Tourism in Lebanon
- History of Lebanon
- Culture of Lebanon
- List of museums
- Archaeology of Lebanon
