= Tourism in Lebanon =

Beirut Central District

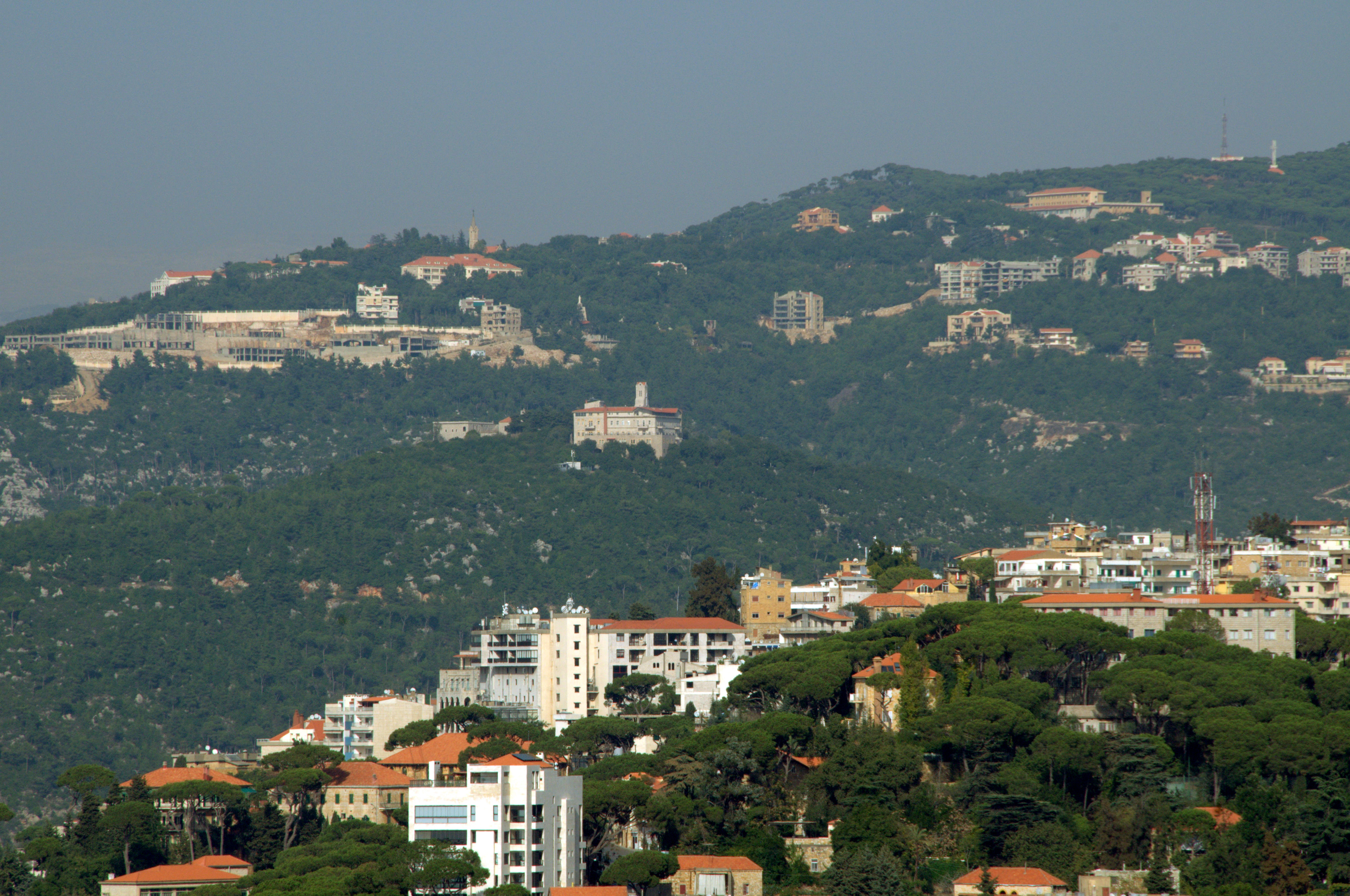
Mount Lebanon

The tourism industry in Lebanon has been important to the local economy historically and comprises a major source of revenue for the country.

From Stone Age settlements to Phoenician city-states, Roman temples to rock-cut hermitages, Crusader castles to Mamluk mosques and Ottoman hammams, the country's many historical landmarks and archaeological sites reflect thousands of years of world history. In addition, Lebanon has a history of cultural tourism. Outsider interest in Lebanese culture was especially stirred following the visits of European orientalists, scholars, and poets, particularly Alphonse de Lamartine, Ernest Renan, and Victor Guérin.

Prior to the Lebanese Civil War, Lebanon was regarded as "The Switzerland of the Middle East", and Beirut was referred to as "The Paris of the Middle East", and as a financial hub.

Casino du Liban reopened in 1996. The largest ski resort in the country was expanded and modernized. Lebanon's tourism industry also relies on Lebanese living abroad, who return regularly to the country during the summer season.

== Citadels and forts ==
Mseilha Fort

- Mseilha Fort is a medieval fortification situated north of the city of Batroun. The current fort was built by Emir Fakhreddine II in the 17th century to guard the route from Tripoli to Beirut. The fort is built on a limestone rock near the Nahr el-Jaouz River. Its walls are constructed with small sandstone blocks quarried from the nearby coast and built onto the edge of the limestone rock. The larger limestone blocks are the only remains of an earlier structure. The fort is approached through a path and small stairway cut into the northern side of the bedrock. A small platform precedes the arched main gate, secured by two loopholes and a small opening in the ceiling above the entrance. The main gate leads to a vaulted vestibule, followed by a narrow triangular courtyard, giving access to a small one meter (3 feet) wide passageway leading to the archery room of the west tower. The more elevated part of the fort is accessed through the east side of the main courtyard.

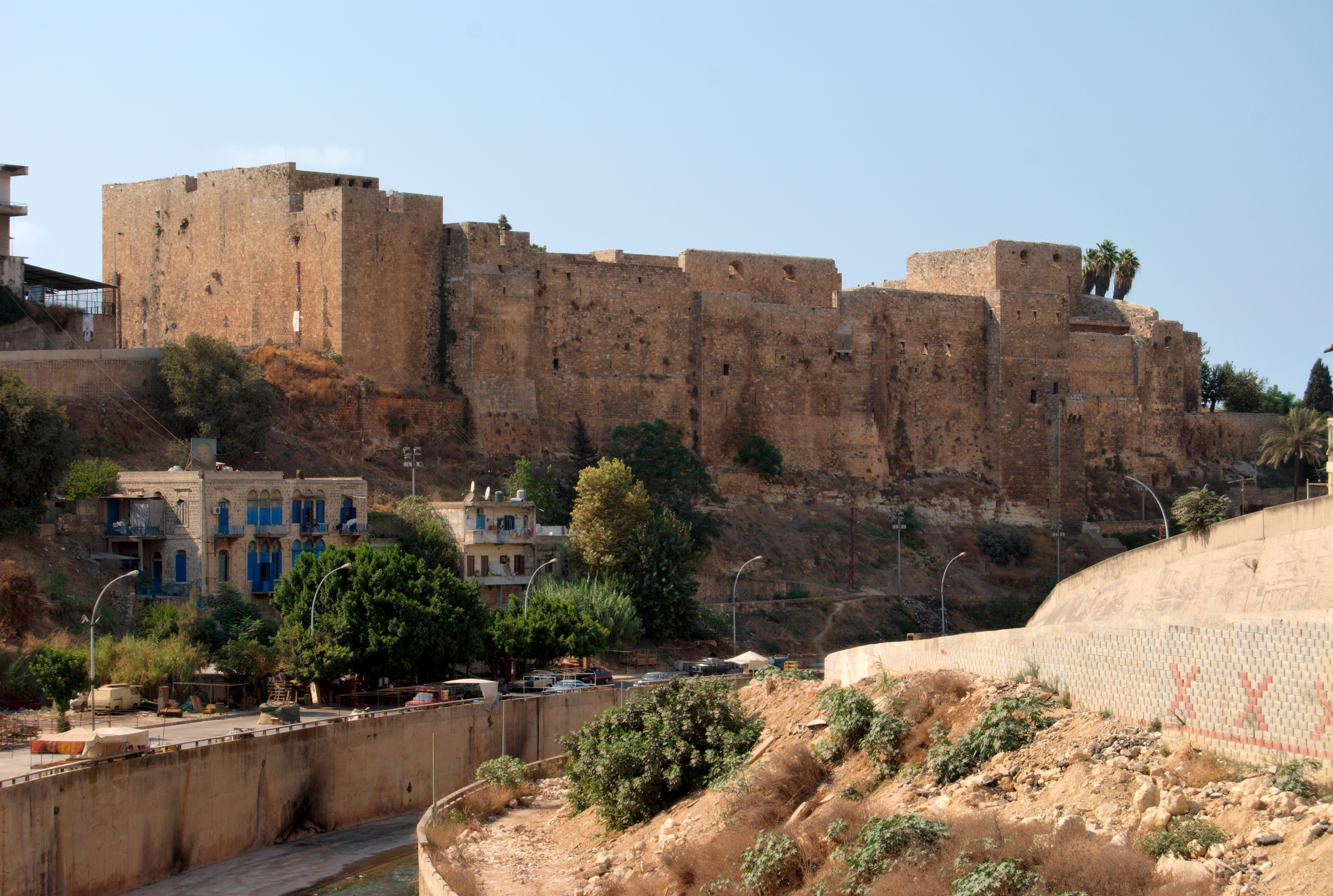
Citadel of Raymond de Saint-Gilles

- Citadel of Raymond de Saint-Gilles, also known as Qala'at Sanjil in Arabic, is a citadel and fort in Tripoli, Lebanon. It takes its name from Raymond de Saint-Gilles, the Count of Toulouse and Crusader commander who started its construction on a hilltop outside Tripoli in 1103 in order to lay siege to the city. Later, Raymond enlarged the fortress, which he named Mont Peregrinus (Mt Pilgrim). The original castle was burnt down in 1289, and rebuilt again on numerous occasions and was rebuilt in 1307-08 by Emir Essendemir Kurgi. Later the citadel was rebuilt in part by the Ottoman Empire which can be seen today, with its Ottoman gateway, over which is an engraving from Süleyman the Magnificent who had ordered the restoration. In the early 19th century, the Citadel was restored by the Ottoman Governor of Tripoli Mustafa Agha Barbar.

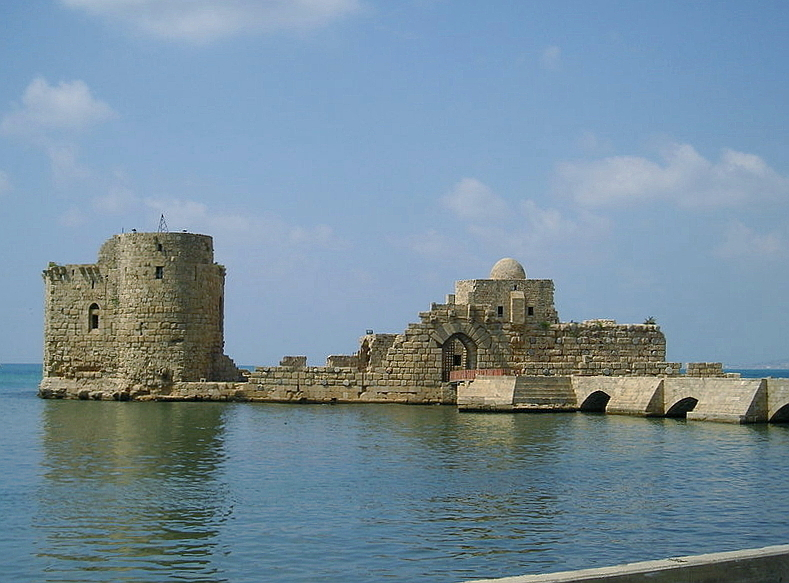
Sidon Sea Castle

- Sidon Sea Castle is a Crusader castle in the southern city of Sidon. During the 13th century, the Crusaders built Sidon's Sea Castle as a fortress on a small island connected to the mainland by a narrow 80m long roadway. The island was formerly the site of a temple to Melkart, the Phoenician version of Hercules. It was damaged I wars and renovated several times. It was partially destroyed by the Mamluks when they took over the city from the Crusaders, but they subsequently rebuilt it and added the causeway. The castle later fell into disuse, but was again restored in the 17th century by Emir Fakhreddine II, only to suffer great damage. Today the castle consists primarily of two towers connected by a wall. In the outer walls, Roman columns were used as horizontal reinforcements, a feature often seen in fortifications built on or near former Roman sites.

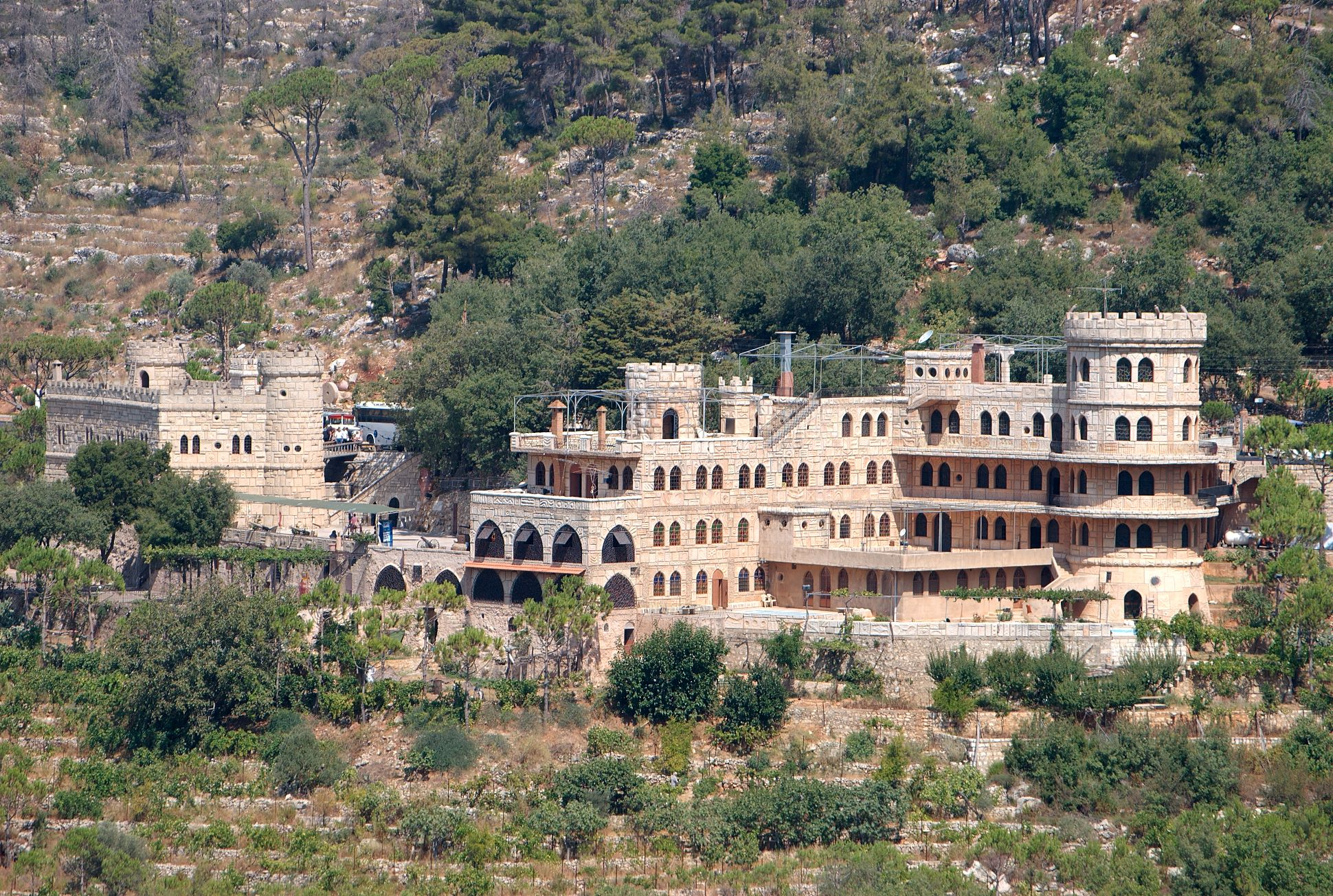
Moussa Castle

- Moussa Castle is a castle between Deir el Qamar and Beit ed-Dine in Lebanon. It was built single-handedly by Moussa Abdel Karim Al-Maamari (born on July 27, 1931).

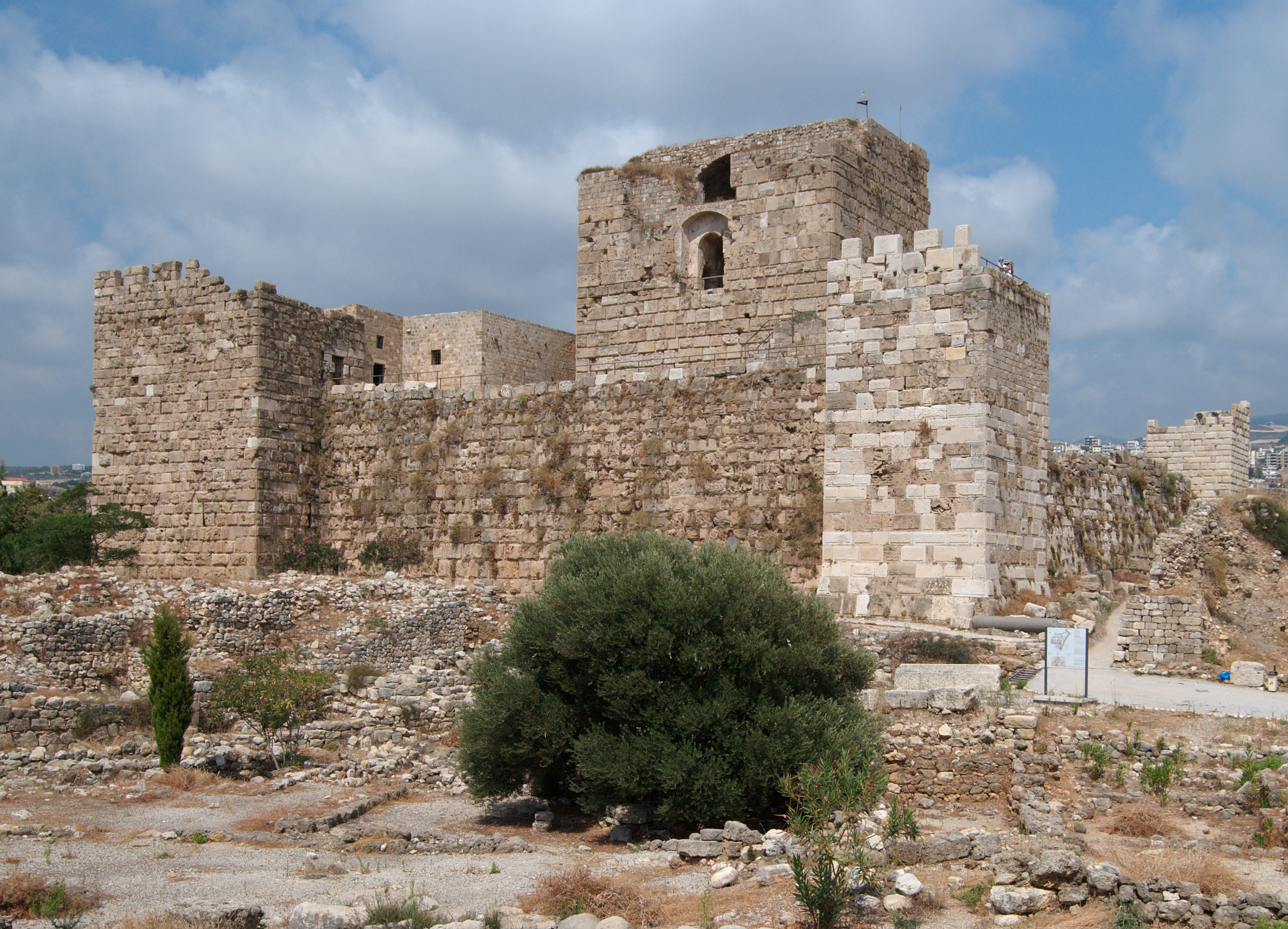
Byblos Castle

- Byblos Castle is a medieval castle in the town of Byblos. Originally a Phoenician stronghold, the castle was built over a white limestone cliff along the Mediterranean coastline of the town. It was built by the Crusaders in the 12th century from indigenous limestone and the remains of Roman structures. The finished structure was surrounded by a moat. Saladin captured the town and castle in 1188 and dismantled the walls in 1190. Later, the Crusaders recaptured Byblos and rebuilt the fortifications of the castle in 1197. In 1369, the castle had to fend off an attack from Cypriot vessels from Famagusta.
- Beaufort Castle is a Crusader fortress in Nabatieh Governorate, Southern Lebanon, about 1 kilometer (0.62 mi) to the south-south-east of the village of Arnoun. There was a fortification on the site before it was captured by Fulk, King of Jerusalem, in 1139. Saladin captured Beaufort in 1190, and 60 years returned to Crusader control. In 1268 Sultan Baibars captured the castle. The castle was named "bel fort" or "beau fort" (French for "beautiful fortress") by the Crusaders who occupied the castle in the 12th century. Its Arabic name Qala'at al-Shaqif means Castle of the High Rock (shqif is the Aramaic word for "high rock"). Beaufort provides one of the few cases where a medieval castle proved of military value and utility also in modern warfare, as its late 20th-century history shows. In the 17th century Fakhr-al-Din II took the castle as a part of his network of fortifications. Fakhr-al-Din II was defeated by the Ottomans, who destroyed the upper portions of the castle. The area was ruled by feudal families until 1769. In 1782 the Governor of Acre besieged the castle, captured it and destroyed many of its remaining fortifications. The Galilee earthquake of 1837 caused further damage to the structure and from then on the ruins were used as a quarry and a shelter for sheep.

== Old towns ==
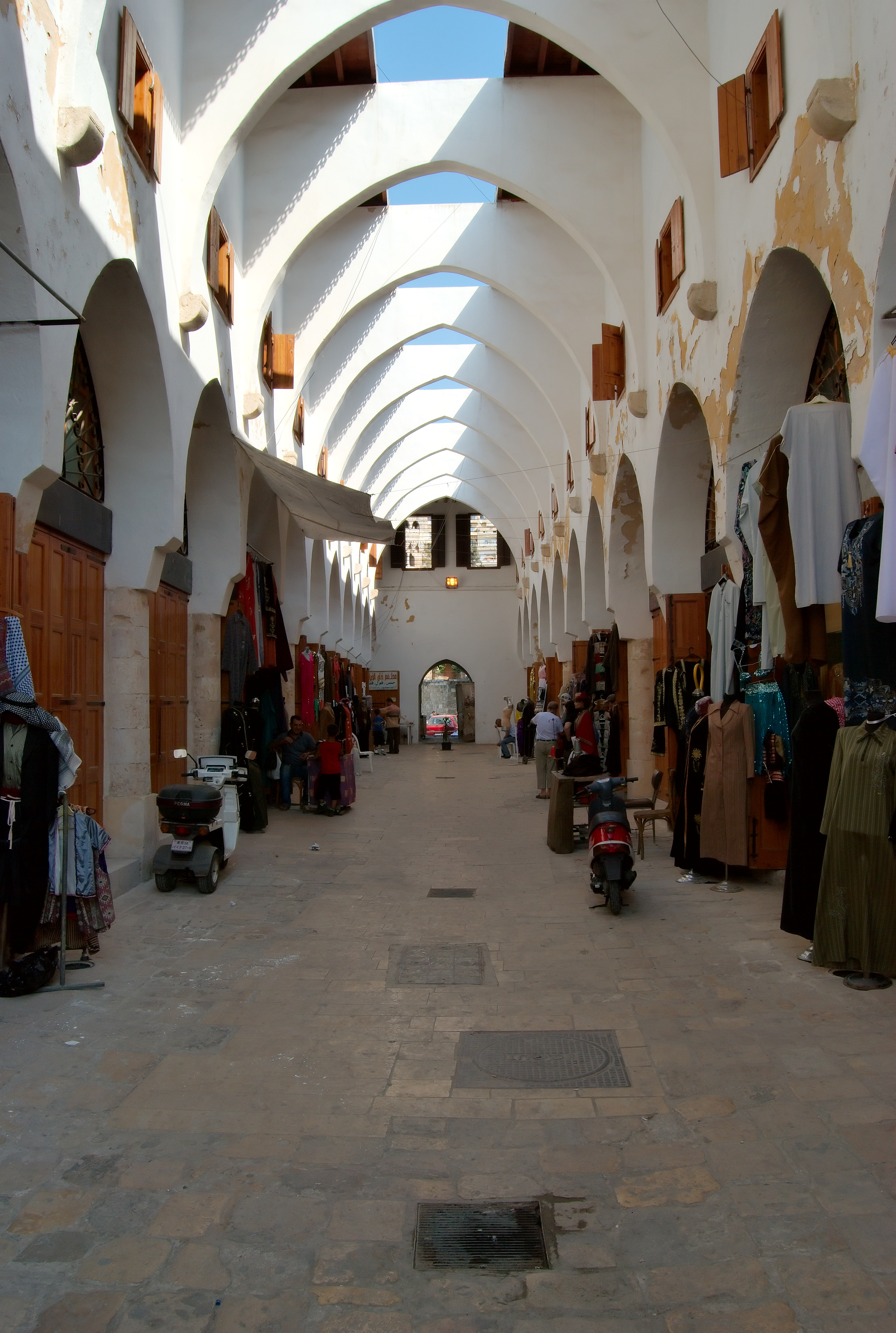
Old town of Tripoli

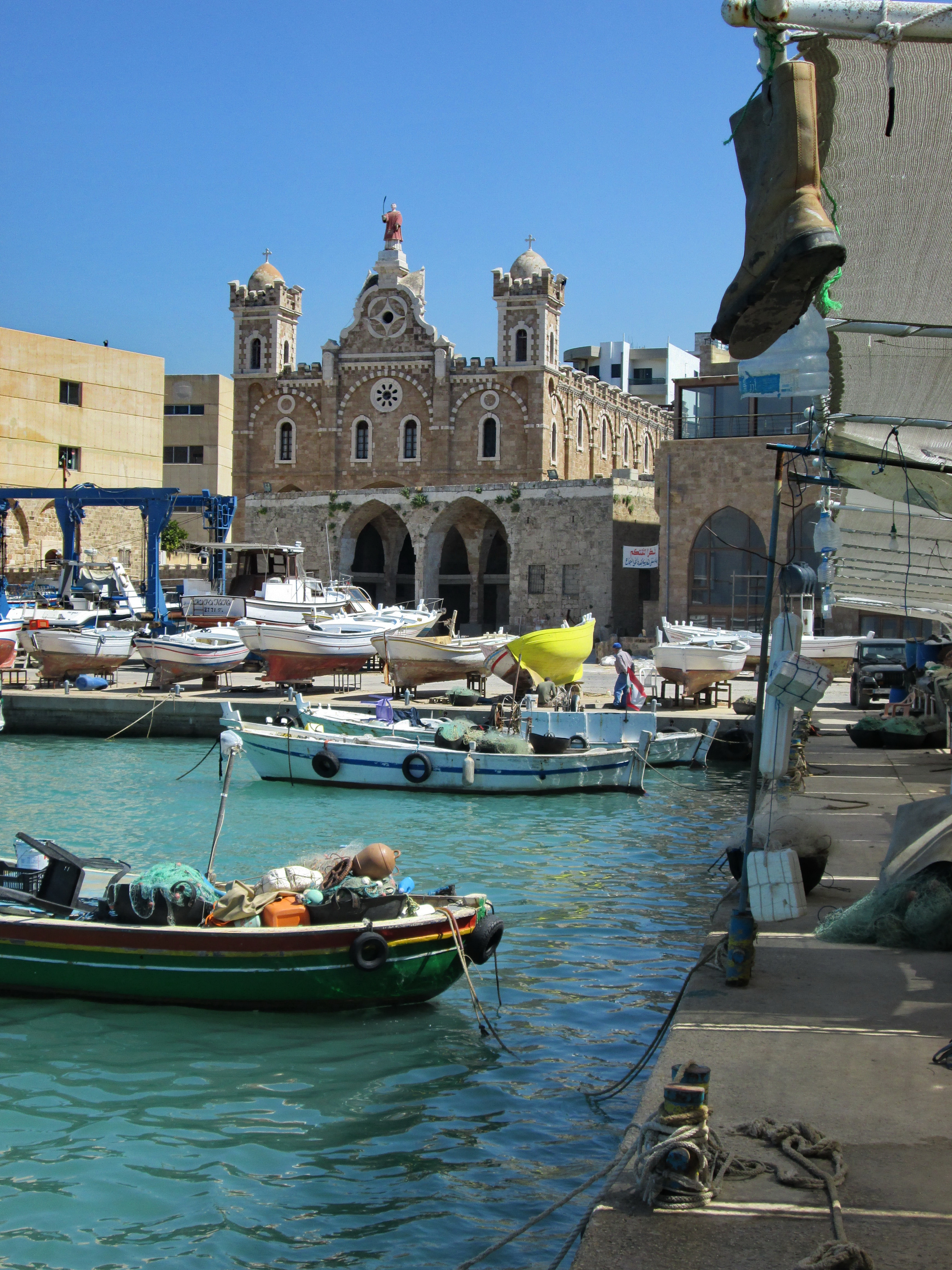
Batroun

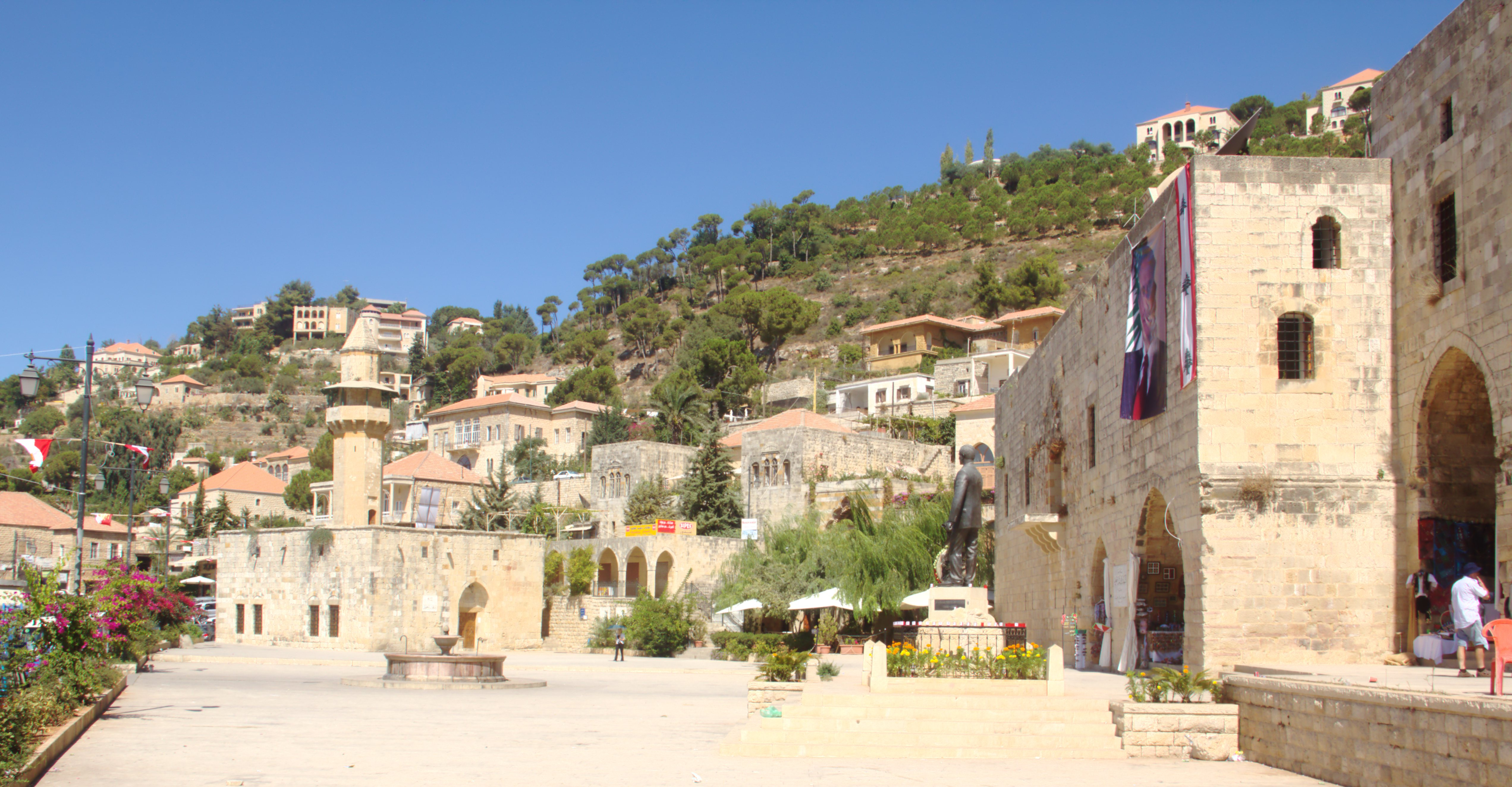
Deir el Qamar

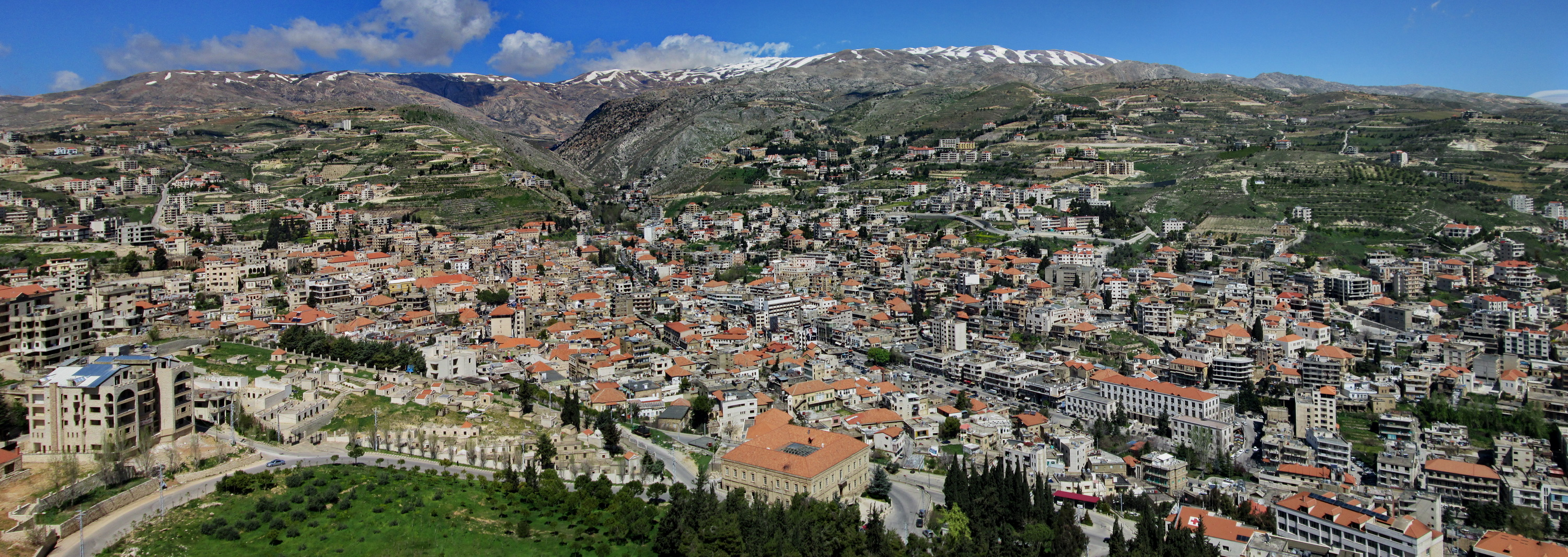
Zahleh

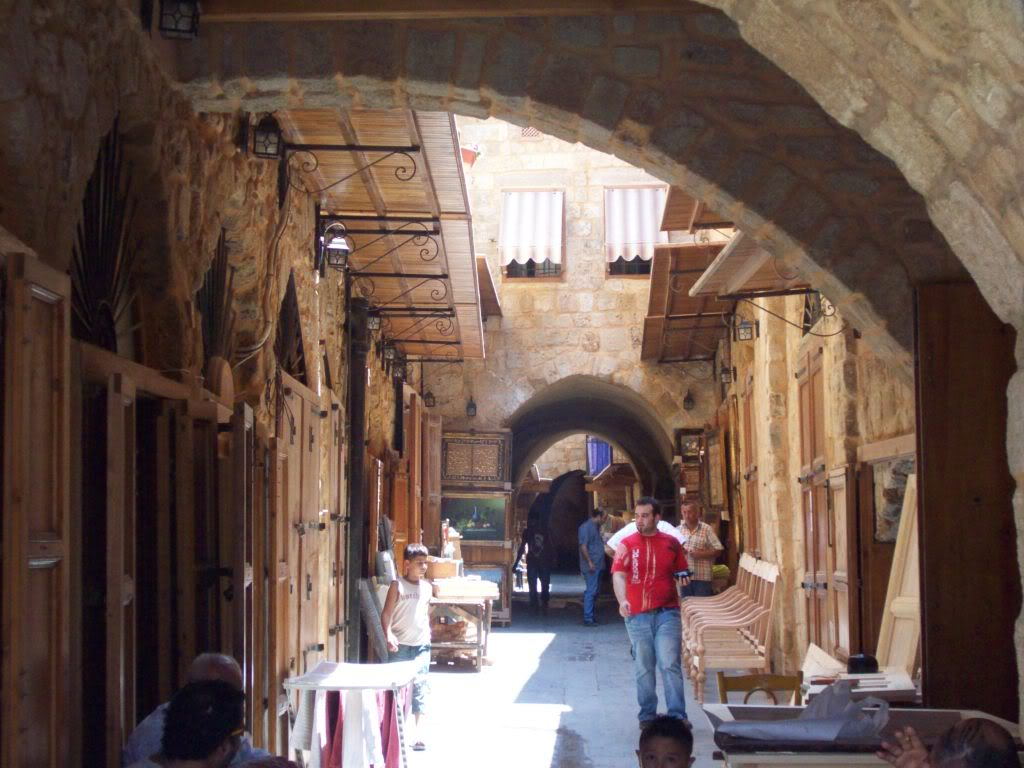
Old City of Sidon

Old towns still form the center or core of many Lebanese cities and towns. The majority of these old towns dot the coastline of Lebanon, with only a small number of them found in the country's interior.

- Tripoli is the second largest city in Lebanon and is the capital of the North Governorate. Dating back to the 14th century BCE, the city was the center of a Phoenician confederation between Tyre, Sidon and Arados, hence the name "Tripoli" meaning "Triple City" in Greek. It was the capital of the last Crusader state in the Levant the County of Tripoli in the 12th century. Tripoli was a trading Port city between Europe on one hand, and Aleppo & Damascus on another. The old town of Tripoli is home to historical sites like the Citadel of Raymond de Saint-Gilles, Taynal Mosque, Mansouri Great Mosque and other Hammams, Madrasas, and caravanserais.
- Batroun is a coastal city in Lebanon and the capital of the Batroun District in the North Governorate. The name Batroun derives from the Greek, Botrys (also spelled Bothrys), which was later Latinized to Botrus. The Phoenicians founded Batroun on the southern side of the promontory called in Antiquity, Theoprosopon and during the Byzantine Empire, Cape Lithoprosopon. Batroun is said to have been founded by Ithobaal I (Ethbaal), king of Tyre, whose daughter Jezabel married Ahab. The city belonged under Roman rule to Phoenicia Prima province, and later after the region was Christianized became a suffragan of the Patriarchate of Antioch. In the 551 Beirut earthquake, Batroun was destroyed, and mudslides and cracks occurred at the Cape Lithoprosopon. One of Batroun's medieval archaeological sites is the Crusader citadel of Mseilha Fort which was constructed on an isolated rock with steep sides protruding in the middle of a plain surrounded by mountains. Under Ottoman rule, Batroun was the center of a caza in the mutessariflik of Lebanon and the seat of a Maronite diocese, suffragan to the Maronite patriarchate. Since 1999 it has been the seat of the Maronite eparchy. Today, Batroun is composed of an old town with old stone churches and alleyways, around the old Phoenician harbor.
- Deir el Qamar is a village in south-central Lebanon, five kilometers outside of Beiteddine, consisting of stone houses with red-tiled roofs. During the 16th to 18th centuries, Deir el Qamar was the residence of the governors of Lebanon. It is also notable for its 15th-century Fakhredine Mosque, Fakhreddine II Palace, and other historical palaces and administrative buildings. The 17th century Deir el Qamar Synagogue is also in the village, although closed to the public. During its peak, the city was the center of Lebanese literary tradition. One of the most important historical and religious sites in Deir El Qamar is Our Lady of the Hill known as Saydet El Talle. This Maronite church goes back to the 15th century.
- Zahleh is the capital and largest city of the Bekaa Governorate in east Lebanon. It is situated 55 km (34 mi) east of the capital Beirut, close to the Beirut-Damascus road, and lies at the junction of Mount Lebanon and the Beqaa valley, at a mean elevation of 1000 m. Its inhabitants are predominantly Greek Catholic and known as Zahlawi. Zahlé is built upon a series of foothills of the Lebanon mountains, with Mount Sannine towering above it at a height of 2,628 meters (8,622 feet). Zahlé was founded in the early 18th century, in an area whose past reaches back some five millennia. It enjoyed a brief period as the region's first independent state in the 19th century when it had its own flag and anthem. Zahlé was burned in 1777 and 1791, and it was burned again and plundered in 1860 during a conflict between the Christian population of the town and the Druze of the neighboring areas. It houses Ottoman-era buildings, old churches, the Our Lady of Bekaa shrine, and a saray.
- Sidon is the third largest city in Lebanon and the capital of the South Governorate. It lies on the Mediterranean sea, 40 km north of Tyre and 40 km south of Beirut. Sidon has been inhabited since very early in prehistory. Sidon suffered from a succession of conquerors. At the end of the Persian era in 351 BC, it was invaded by the emperor Artaxerxes III and then by Alexander the Great in 333 BC when the Hellenistic era of Sidon began. Under the successors of Alexander, it enjoyed relative autonomy. The historical core of Sidon is a Mamluk-era old city that extends between the Sea Castle and the St. Louis Castle. Several mosques dating back to the Umayyad Era are still preserved. Sidon's Old City is home to ancient churches and stone mosques that were built above pagan temples.
- Tyre, Lebanon has an old town located next to the Roman ruins at the tip of the peninsula. Tyre was originally an island until Alexander the Great built a causeway to seize the city during a battle in the Siege of Tyre. It is home to one of the best preserved Roman Hippodromes in the world among many other ancient ruins.
- Rachaya is an old town situated in the Wadi el Taym region in the West Bekaa. The small town is most famous for its Crusader castle, which was later used as a prison in which the founding fathers of the country were imprisoned during their struggle for independence.

== Museums ==
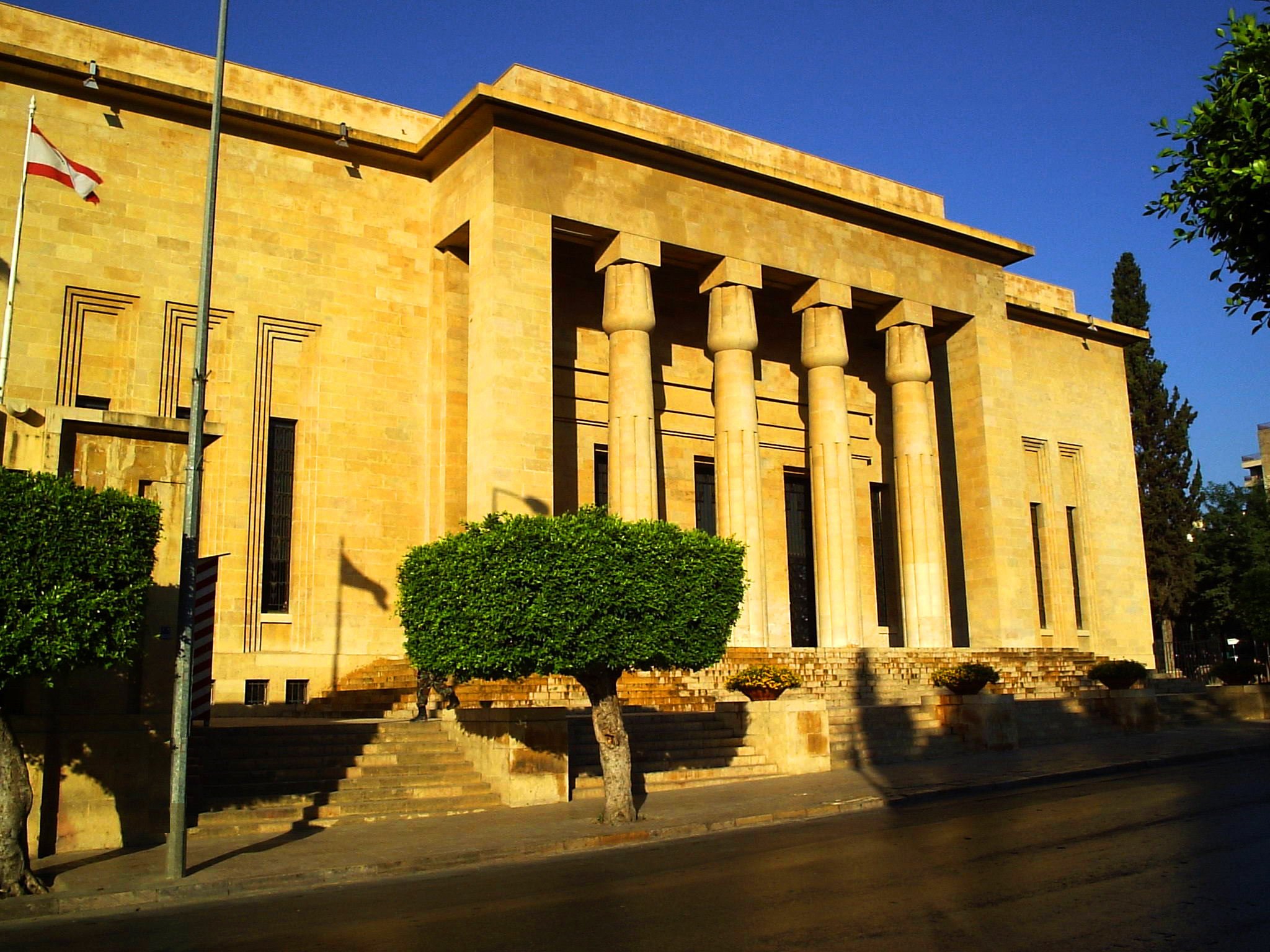
National Museum of Beirut

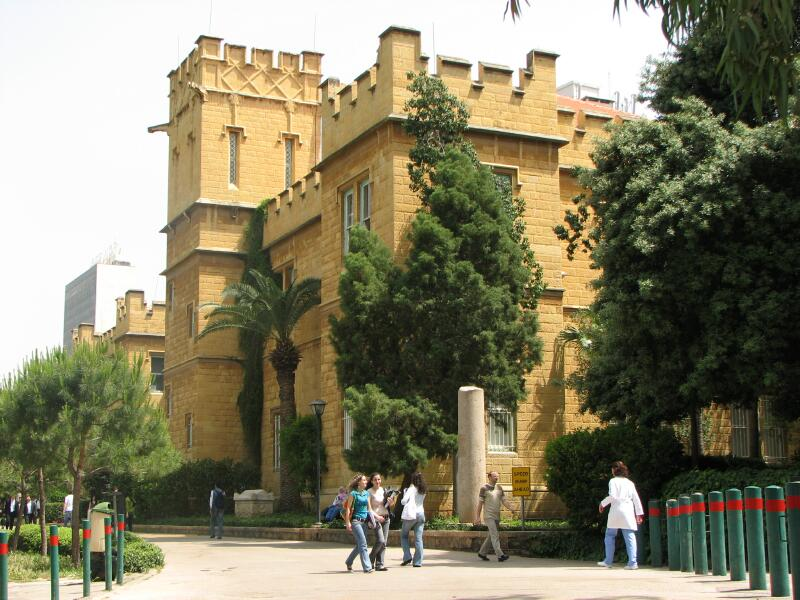
Archaeological Museum of the American University of Beirut

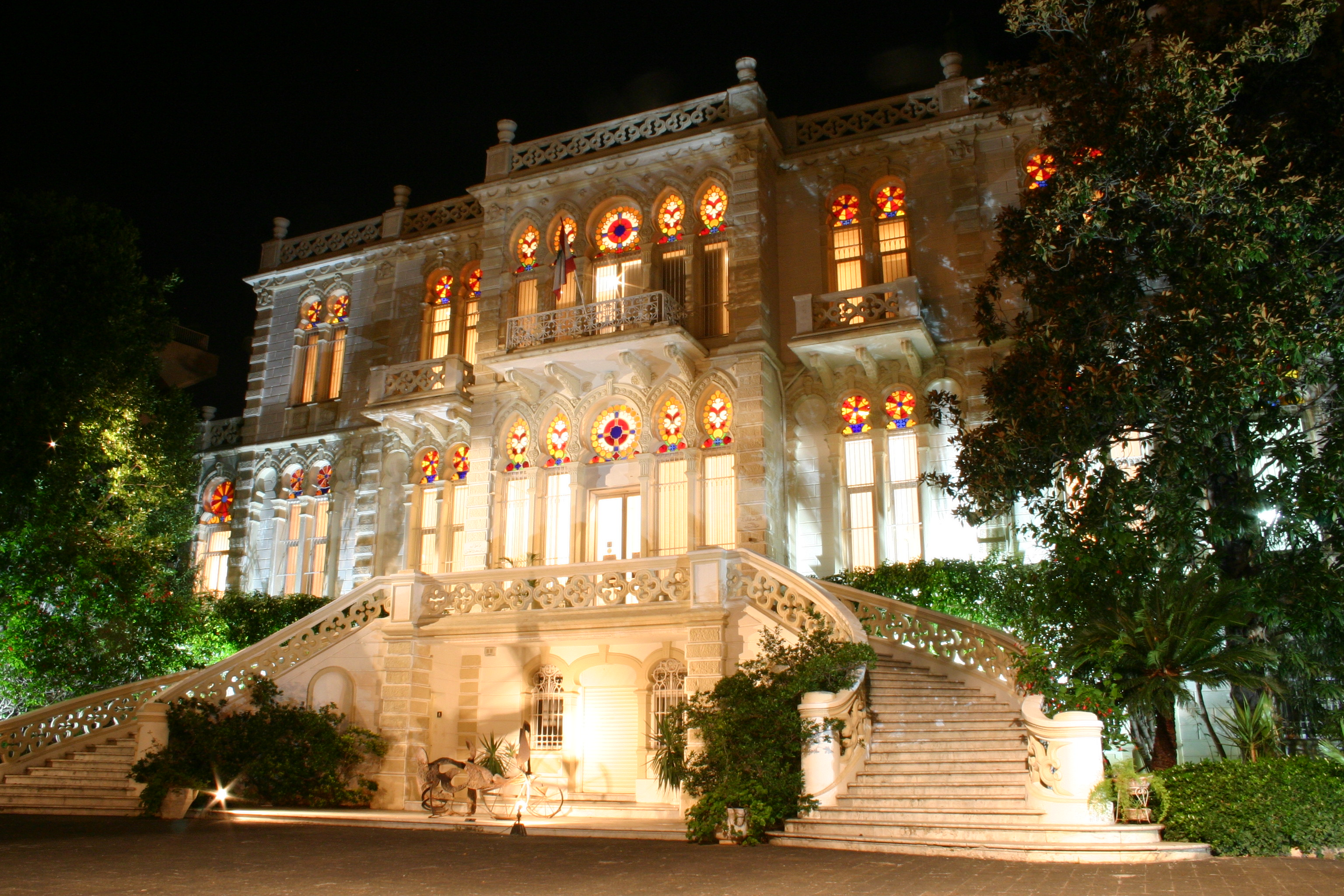
Sursock Museum

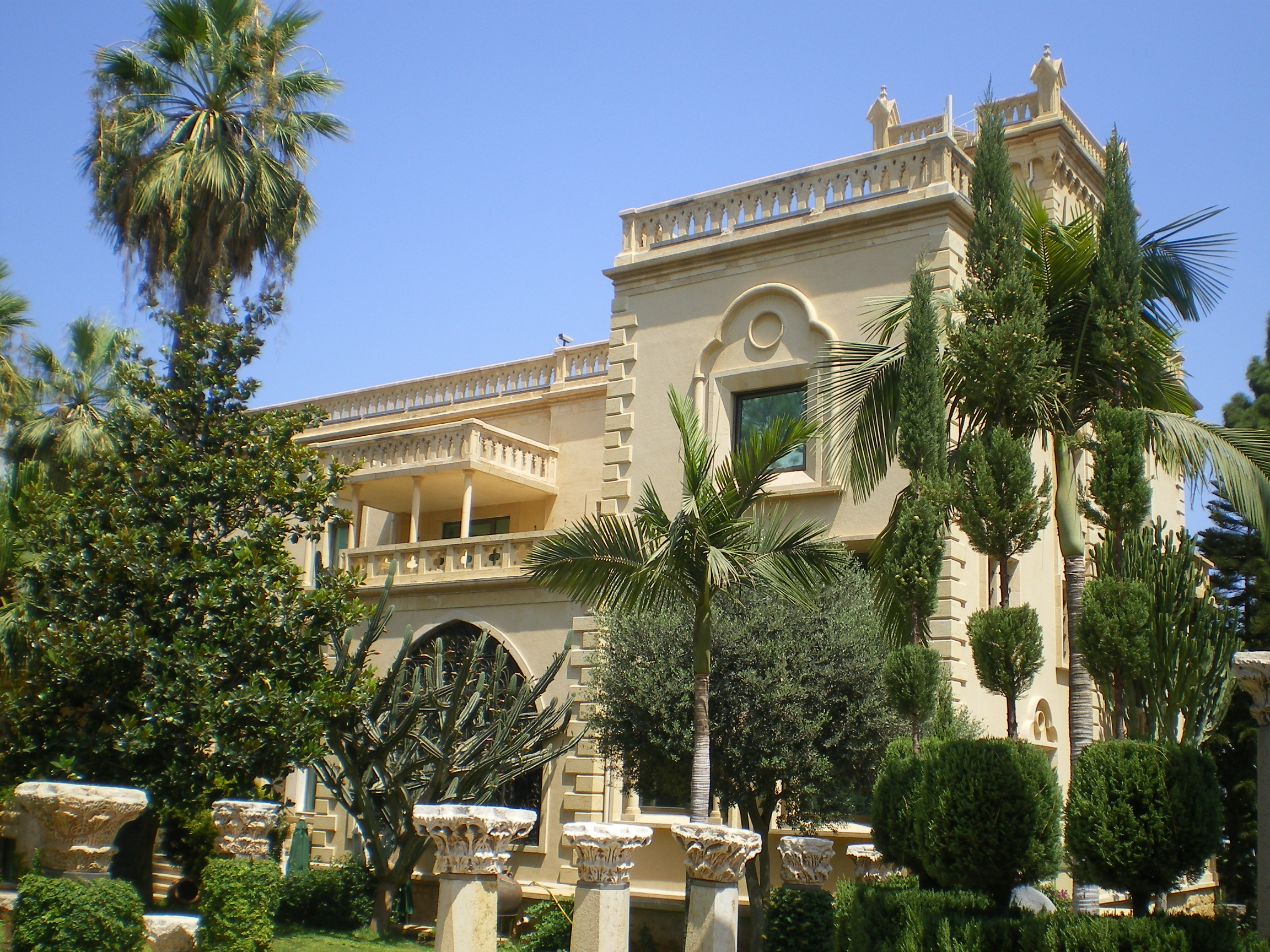
Robert Mouawad Private Museum

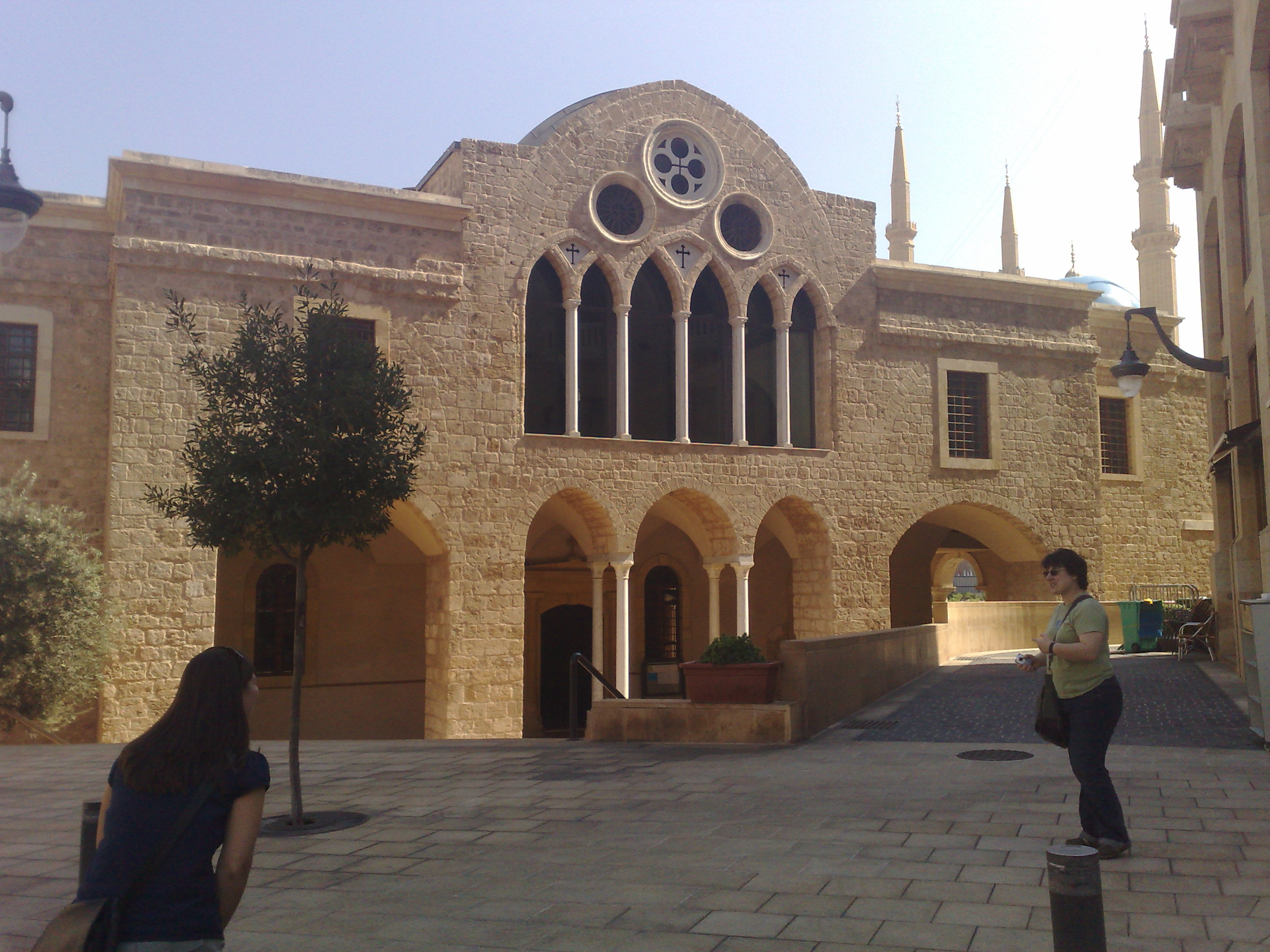
Saint George Greek Orthodox Cathedral

- Beirut National Museum is the principal museum of archaeology in Lebanon. The collection was begun after World War I, and the museum was officially opened in 1942. The museum has collections totaling about 100,000 objects, most of which are antiquities and medieval finds from excavations undertaken by the Directorate General of Antiquities. About 1300 artifacts are exhibited, ranging in date from prehistoric times to the medieval Mamluk period. The museum was designed in a French-inspired Egyptian Revival architecture. The whole site is approximately 5,500 square meters (59,000 sq ft), and the exhibition floor space totals 6,000 square meters (65,000 sq ft). The immediately adjoining museum annexes and administrative offices occupy about 1,000 square meters (11,000 sq ft). The museum displays follow a chronological circuit beginning in Prehistory and ending in the Ottoman era.
- Gibran Museum, formerly the Monastery of Mar Sarkis, is a biographical museum in Bsharri, 120 kilometers from Beirut. It is dedicated to the Lebanese artist, writer and philosopher Khalil Gibran. Founded in 1935, the Gibran Museum possesses 440 original paintings and drawings of Gibran and his tomb. It also includes his furniture and belongings from his studio when he lived in New York City and his private manuscripts. The building which houses the museum and his tomb was bought by his sister in 1931 under Gibran's request, having spiritual significance as a monastery dating back to the 7th century when it was the Mar Sarkis (Saint Serge) hermitage. In 1975, the Gibran National Committee restored and expanded the monastery to house more exhibits and again expanded it in 1995.
- Archaeological Museum of the American University of Beirut is the third-oldest museum in the Near East, after Cairo and Istanbul. The AUB Museum exhibits Levantine artifacts from the Early Stone Age to the Islamic period. The museum was formed in 1868 after Luigi Palma di Cesnola gifted a collection of Cypriot pottery to the newly formed American University of Beirut. Between 1902 and 1938 the Museum acquired collections from all around the Middle East. The museum remained closed during World War II and re-opened in 1948. It expanded in the 1950s and doubled its floor space with a refurbishment under curator Dimitri Baramki which opened to the public in 1964. The collections are organized by chronology and themes with displays along the sides of the gallery displaying the evolution of pottery. Other displays include The Cesnola Collection; the museums first showing pottery from Cyprus from the Bronze Age to the Roman era. The Pre-Historic collection includes Paleolithic and Neolithic eras. The Ksar Akil collection was donated from the University of Boston team that excavated this archaeological site in 1948. The display shows a 23 m stratigraphic sequence of 37 layers illustrated by the flint tools belonging to several cultures detected.
- Sursock Museum is a museum of modern art in the Achrafieh district of Beirut. It belonged to Nicolas Sursock who bequeathed his villa to the city of Beirut after his death in 1961. The museum is an 18th-century mansion built with Venetian and Ottoman architectural influences. It is located on Rue Sursock east of the Beirut Central District. The museum collection consists of 5,000 pieces, such as paintings, sculpture, ceramics, glassware, and iconography, dating from the 18th, 19th, and 20th centuries. Some of the local and international artists whose work are in the Museum's permanent collection are Chafic Abboud, Rafic Charaf, Omar Onsi, and Aref Rayess, among others.
- The Robert Mouawad Private Museum is a private residence in Beirut's Zokak el-Blat quarter that was turned into a museum by the Lebanese businessman Robert Mouawad. The palace was built in the neo-gothic style by Lebanese politician and art collector Henri Philippe Pharaoun in 1911. The museum was inaugurated on May 11, 2006. It houses objects of value reflecting a mix of artistic oriental and occidental cultures, and a collection of books, Chinese porcelain, ceramics, and other significant objects. The palace's architecture and design reflect Pharaoh's infatuation with Islamic Art and decorative wooden panels that date back to the 19th century, especially after his repetitive travels to Syria.
- The Museum of Lebanese Prehistory is the first museum of prehistory in the Arabic Middle East and was opened in June 2000 to commemorate the 125th anniversary of Saint Joseph University of Beirut. The founding of the museum followed from the work of Jesuit scholars who controlled prehistoric research in this part of the world until the 1950s. These had accumulated a large amount of artifacts and heritage, collected at the "Faculté des Lettres et des Sciences Humaines" of Saint Joseph University. This faculty established a research center in 1988 that developed with the creation of the Museum of Prehistory in June 2000. The museum houses a collection of animal and human bones, Neolithic pottery, stone tools and other ancient items recovered from over 400 archaeological sites since the 19th century.
- Saint George Greek Orthodox Cathedral museum is a crypt museum at the St. Georges Greek Orthodox Cathedral on Nejme Square. It is a relatively small museum that reveals layers of Christian heritage belonging to a series of seven churches built on the same exact site starting 2000 years ago. The current cathedral stands on layers of relics where at every stage of its existence its people attempted to enlarge and beautify it, adding more murals and icons. The museum is a crypt underneath the cathedral where oil lamps, pipes, clay and terracotta pots, miniature statues, and crosses found in various digs are displayed. Glass panels cover some of the crypt's relics and a glass partition separates the crypt from the church's altar directly above it. A metal walkway leads visitors through the twelve stops of the crypt displaying tombstones, mosaics, burial chambers, engravings on stones and columns, well-preserved skeletons, a covered canal, and part of an ancient paved road.
- MIM Museum is a private museum in Beirut. The museum displays more than 2000 minerals, representing 450 different species from 70 countries. It opened in 2013. The museum also hosts an exhibition of marine and flying fossils from Lebanon.

Other major museums:

- Dahesh Museum of Art
- Lebanese Heritage Museum
- Byblos Fossil Museum
- Byblos Wax Museum
- Sidon Soap Museum
- MIM Museum

== Religious tourism ==
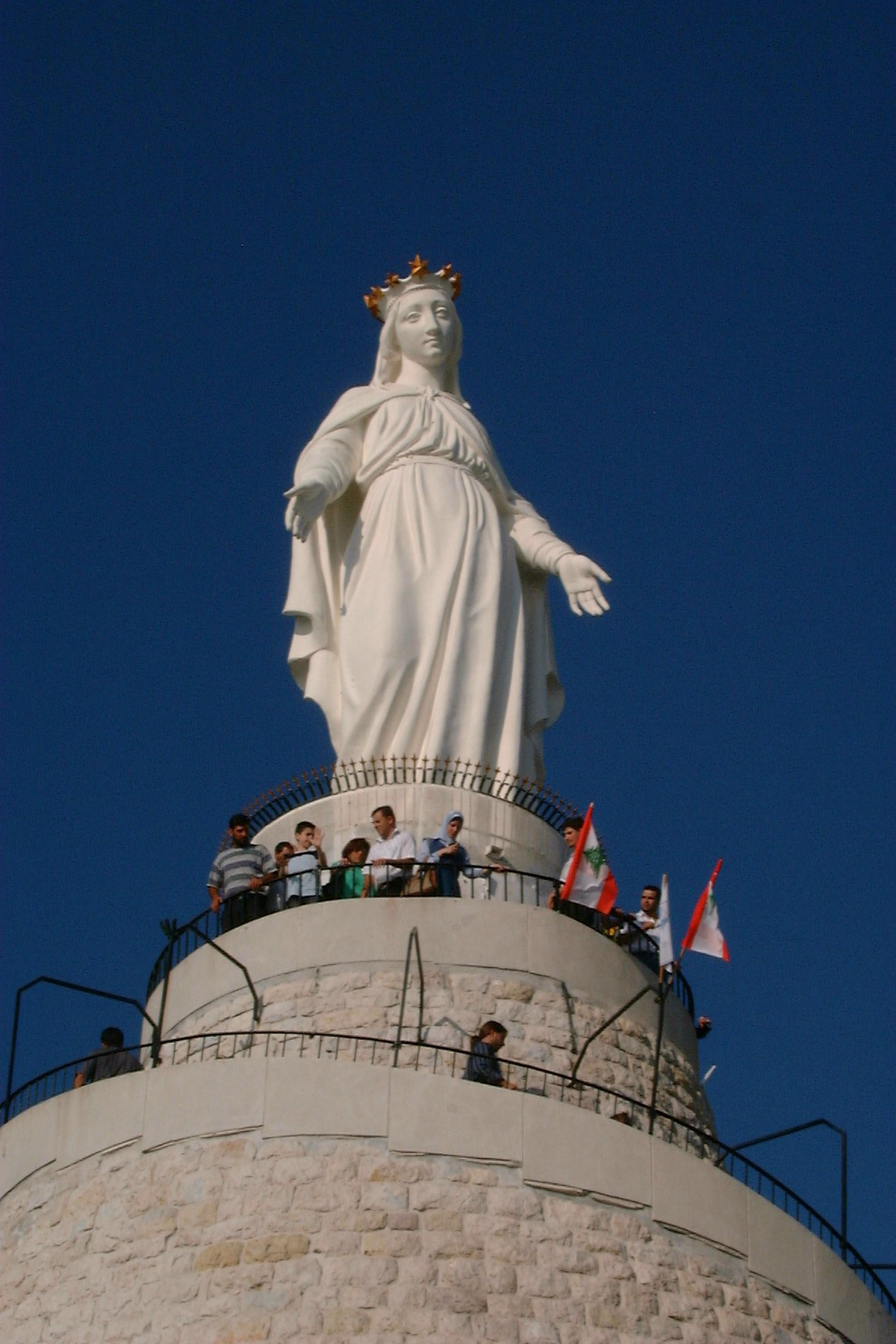
Our Lady of Lebanon

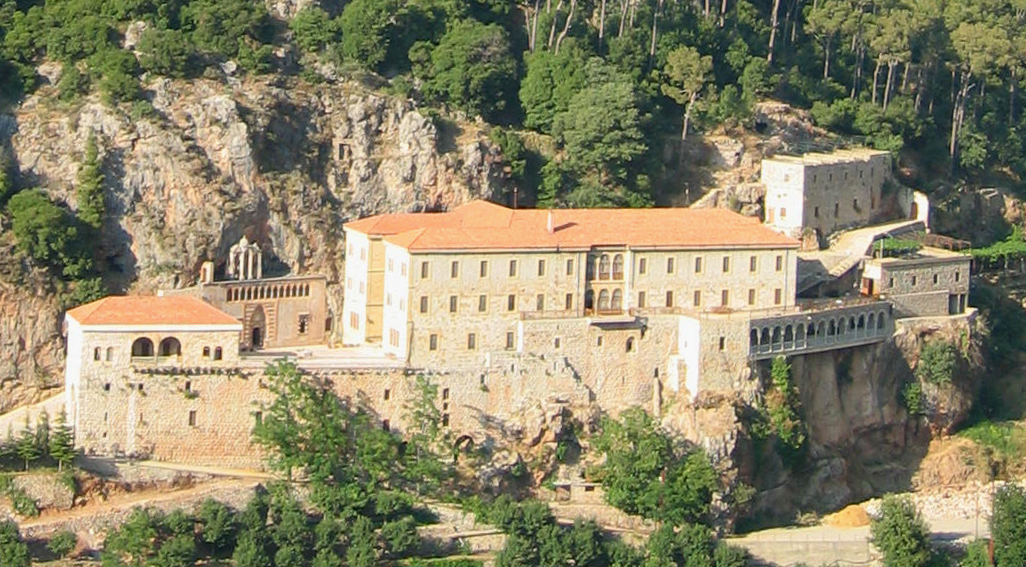
Monastery of Qozhaya

Located in the heart of two major world religions, Christianity and Islam, Lebanon has a religious background with diverse traditions. Lebanon has been a refuge for persecuted religious groups for thousands of years, thus adding a vast amount of religious heritage to the country in both Christian and Islamic sanctuaries and holy places.

- The town of Harissa, Lebanon hosts the Our Lady of Lebanon, also known as Notre Dame du Liban, Marian shrine and pilgrimage site, honoring the patron saint of Lebanon. The village is located 20 km north of Beirut, and accessible from the coastal city of Jounieh either by road or by a nine-minute journey by a gondola lift, known as the "Téléférique". It attracts both pilgrims and tourists. The pilgrimage site is a 15-ton bronze (and painted white) statue of Virgin Mary, known as Our Lady of Lebanon or Notre Dame du Liban, with her arms outstretched. A modernistic Maronite cathedral built of concrete and glass stands right beside the statue. The height of the statue is 8.50m while its perimeter is 5.50m. The statue and the shrine were inaugurated in 1908, and since then it has been a pilgrimage destination in Lebanon. The shrine is erected on top of a 650 meters high wooded hill, equipped with a wide observation deck. The shrine was visited by Pope John Paul II in 1997 and Pope Benedict XVI in 2012.
- Our Lady of Mantara in Maghdouché, also known in English as Our Lady of Awaiting, is a holy Christian site and a Marian shrine. The shrine consists of a tower crowned with the statue of the Virgin and Child, a cathedral, a cemetery and a sacred cave believed to be the one where the Virgin Mary rested while she waited for Jesus. The adjacent hilltop where Jesus and Mary had once stood is now Sidon's Greek Catholic cemetery. Near the sacred cave, the people of Magdhdouché built a cathedral and a modern tower crowned with a bronze statue of the Virgin and Child.
- Our Lady of Bekaa (also spelled Beqaa), is a Marian shrine located in the city of Zahlé in the Beqaa Valley. In 1958, Bishop Euthym, a man of great devotion to Our Lady, decided to build a shrine in honor of the Virgin Mary on the top of a hill overlooking Zahle and the Bekaa Valley. A ten-meter-high bronze statue of the Virgin Mary rests on a 54-meter high tower, crowning a hill known by the name of Tel Chiha. An elevator takes pilgrims and tourists up to a viewing platform.
- Mar Sarkis, Ehden is a monastery located in the Zgharta District in the North Governorate of Lebanon. It is situated in the Qozhaya valley, the northern branch of the valley of Qadisha, to the east of Ehden. Given its location commanding the valley at 1500 meters altitude, the monastery is called the Watchful Eye of Qadisha. It is dedicated to Saints Sarkis and Bakhos (Saints Sergius and Bacchus). The name Ras Al Nahr means the top of the river as it is in the vicinity of the Mar Sarkis Source. The Monastery belongs to the Lebanese Antonin Maronite Order, a Monastic Order founded on August 15, 1700, by the Maronite Patriarch Gabriel Al Blouzani from Blaouza (1704-1705). The first church of Saints Sarkis and Bakhos was built in the mid 8th Century A.D. on the ruins of a Canaanite temple dedicated to a divinity of agriculture. Next to it, another church dedicated to Our Lady was constructed in 1198 A.D.. Several buildings were added from 1404 up until 1690 when Patriarch Estephan El Douaihy restored part of the buildings.
- Monastery of Qozhaya, also transliterated Qazahya is located in the Zgharta District in the North Governorate of Lebanon. It belongs to the Lebanese Maronite Order, known as Baladites. It is dedicated to Saint Anthony the Great. It is commonly called Qozhaya, in reference to the valley in which it is located. The valley of Qozhaya, along with the valley of Qannoubine to which it is connected to the west, form what is called the valley of Qadisha. Several hermitages are attached to it and at a certain period (probably the 12th Century AD), it has been the See of the Maronite Patriarch. In 1708, it was handed down to the newly formed Lebanese Maronite Order. It still belongs to this Order. Qozhaya was at its pinnacle in the first part of the 19th Century with more than 300 monks belonging to it. With its large properties in the valley, in Ain-Baqra and in Jedaydeh, Qozhaya is one of the richest monasteries of the Order. It contributes financially to the maintenance of the less fortunate monasteries of the Order.
- Our Lady of Bzommar is worshiped at the Monastery of Bzommar, belonging to the Armenian Catholic Church.
- Emir Munzer Mosque This mosque was constructed by Emir Munzer Al-Tannoukhi. The mosque was also known as Masjid Al-Naoufara because of the fountain in its courtyard.
- Emir Assaf Mosque Emir Assaf Mosque is located in downtown Beirut, Emir Mansur Assaf inaugurated the mosque in 1597, on the former Serail Square.
- Mansouri Great Mosque The Mansouri Great Mosque is a mosque in Tripoli, also known simply as The Great Mosque of Tripoli. It was built in the Mamluk period, from 1294 to 1314, around the remains of a Crusader Church of St. Mary.
- Al-Nabi Shayth A mosque was built on the burial site and it contains the grave of Seth, son of Adam.
- The mosque of Ibrahim al-Khalil Is a mosque built by the Muslims when first entered Lebanon. It was built at year 635 CE and it is located in the city of Baalbek.
- Ra's el-Ain Mosque Is Known by the name of “Masjid el-Hussein”, this mosque was built in 61AH/681AC above the ruins of an old Phoenician temple. The stones of the temple were used in building the mosque.

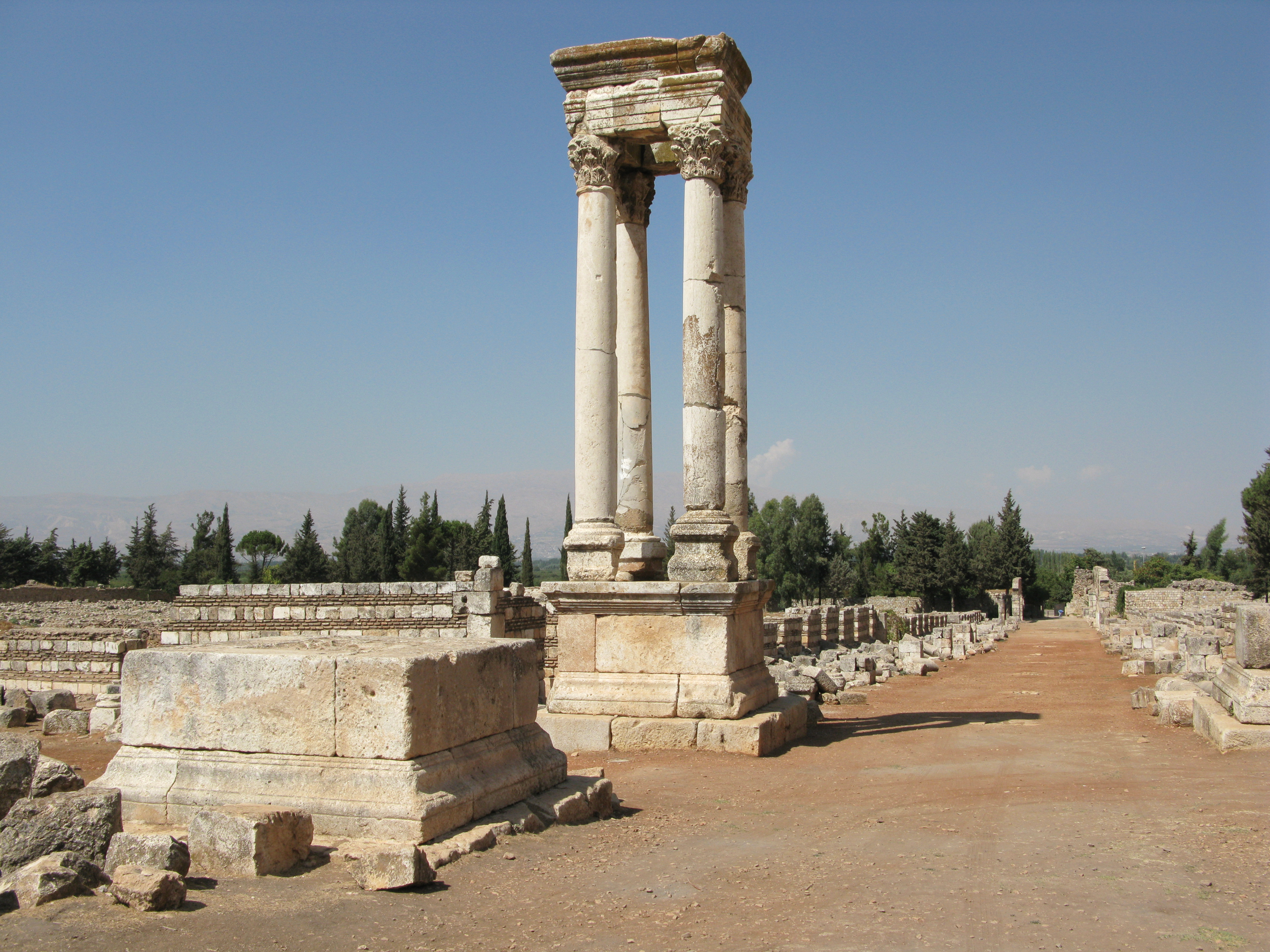
Tetrapylon at the center of the city of Anjar

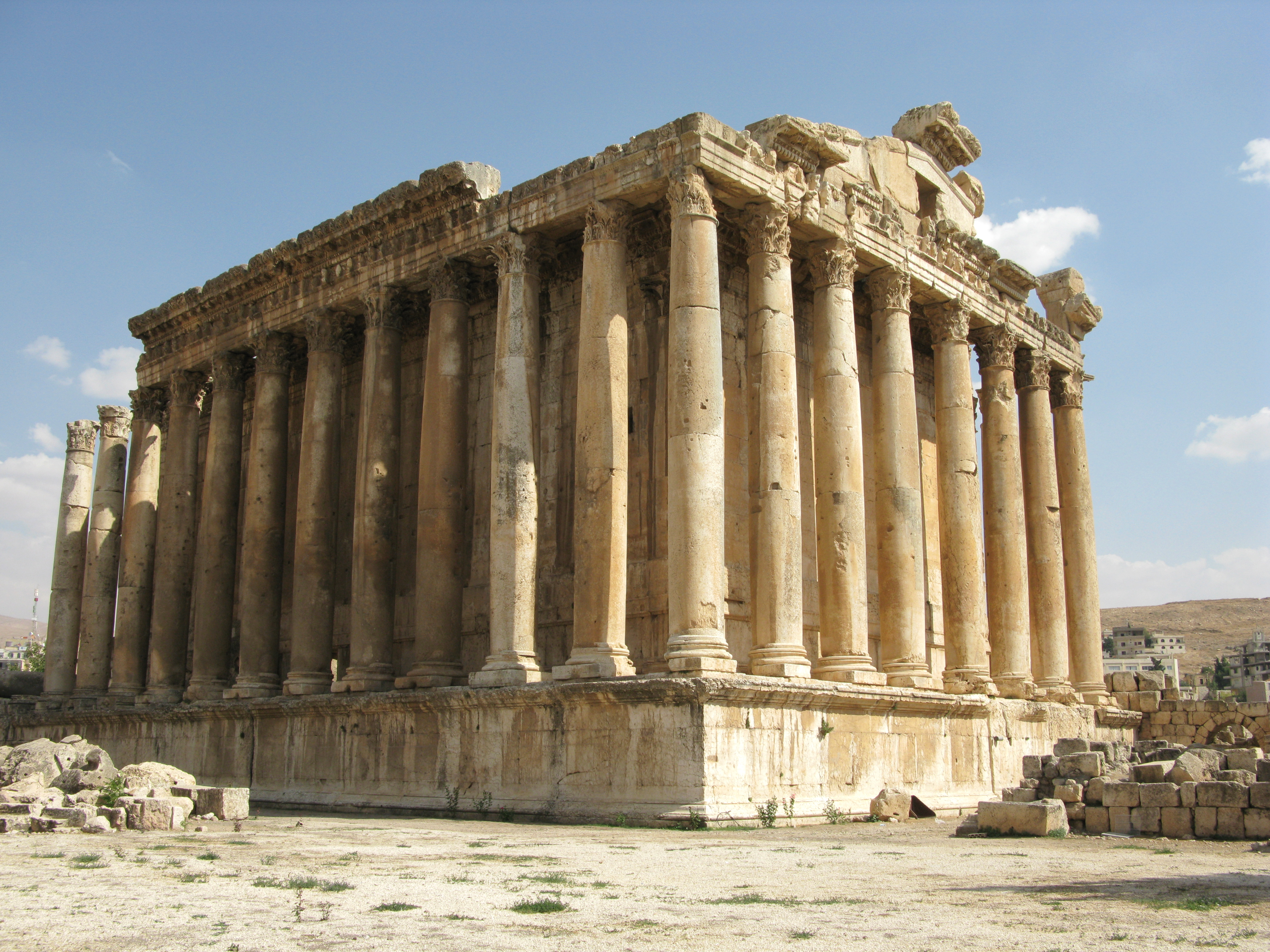
Roman temple of Bacchus in Baalbeck

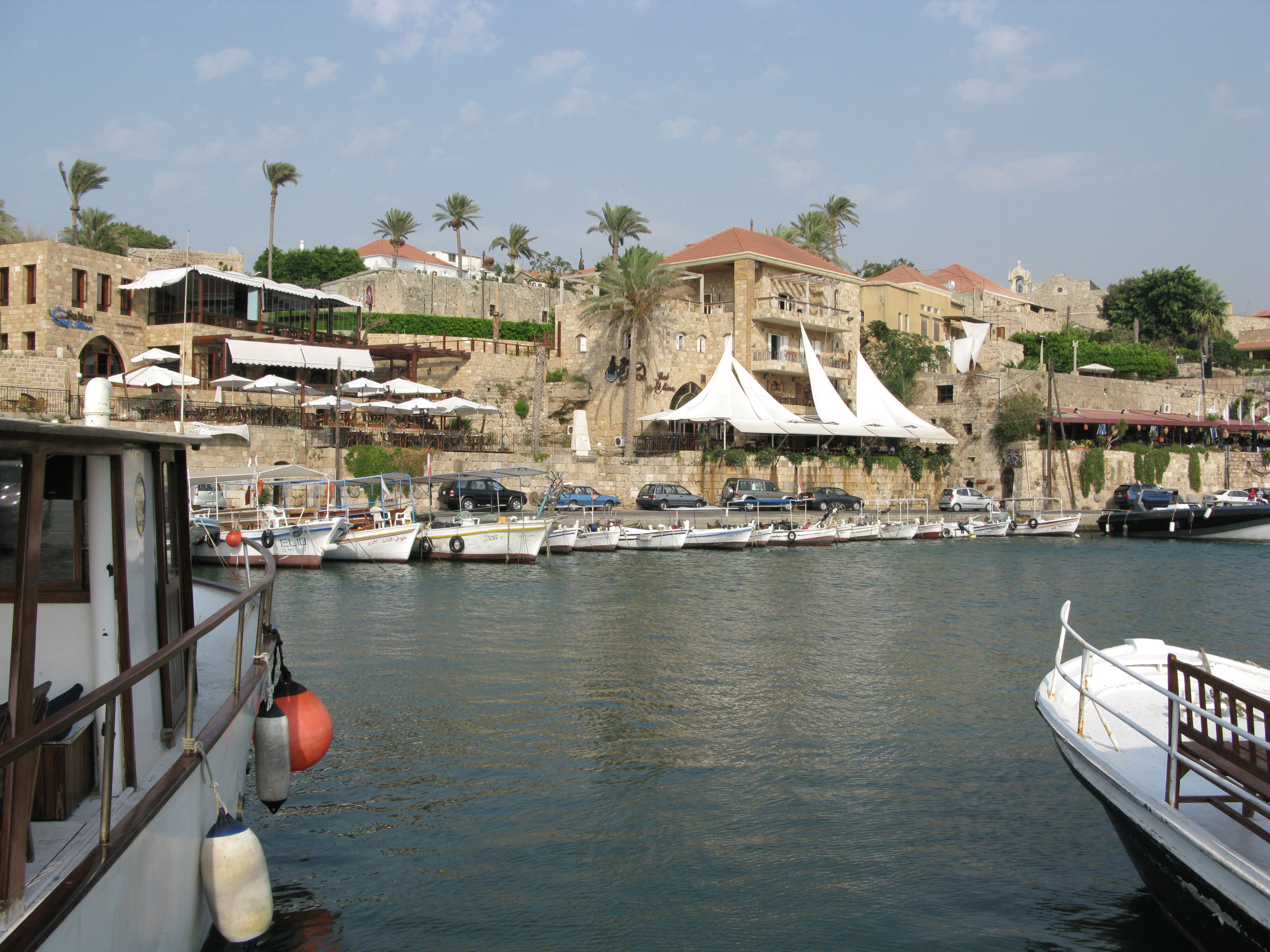
The ancient Byblos port

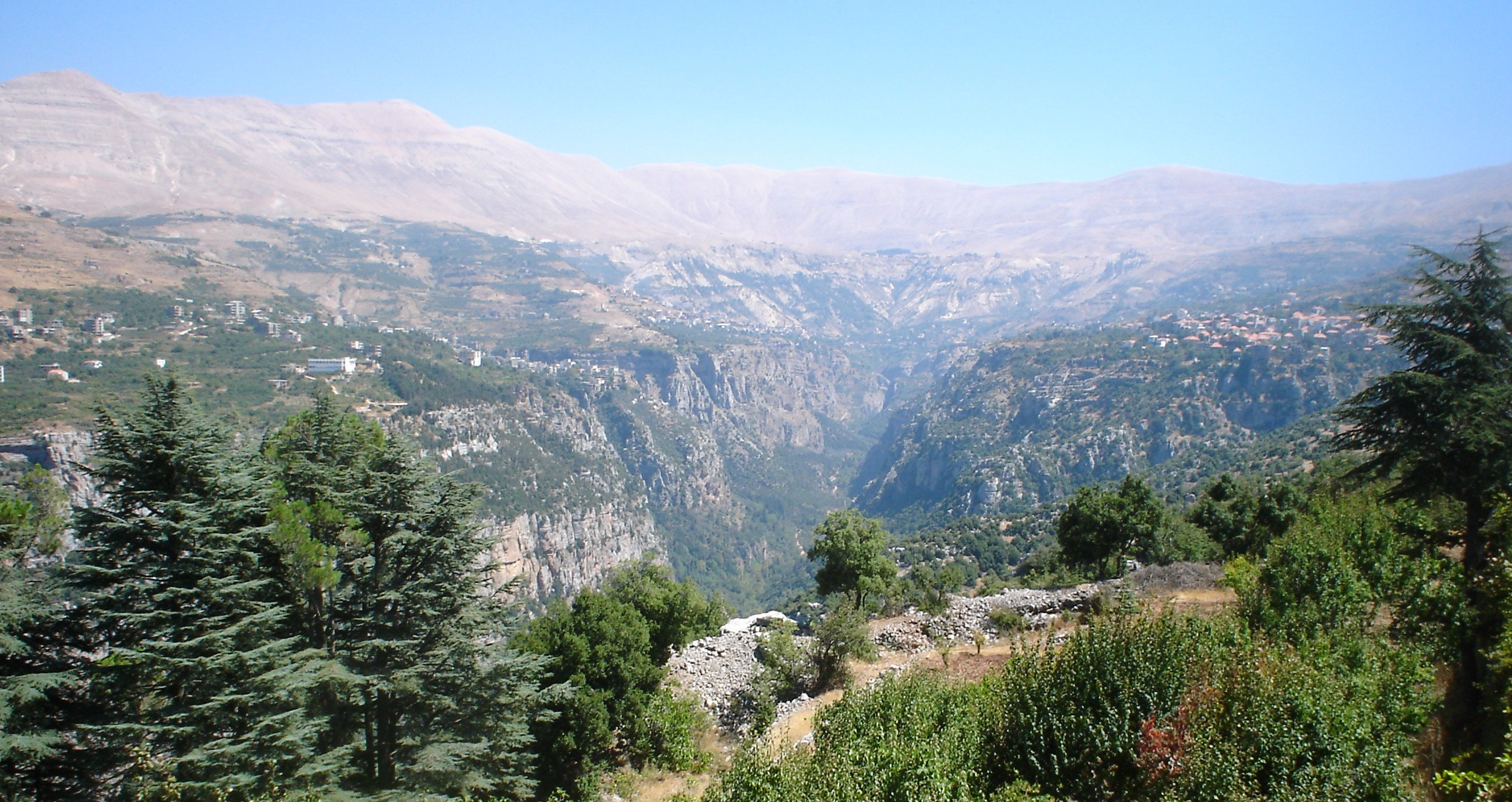
View of the Kadisha Valley and the Cedars Forest in the background

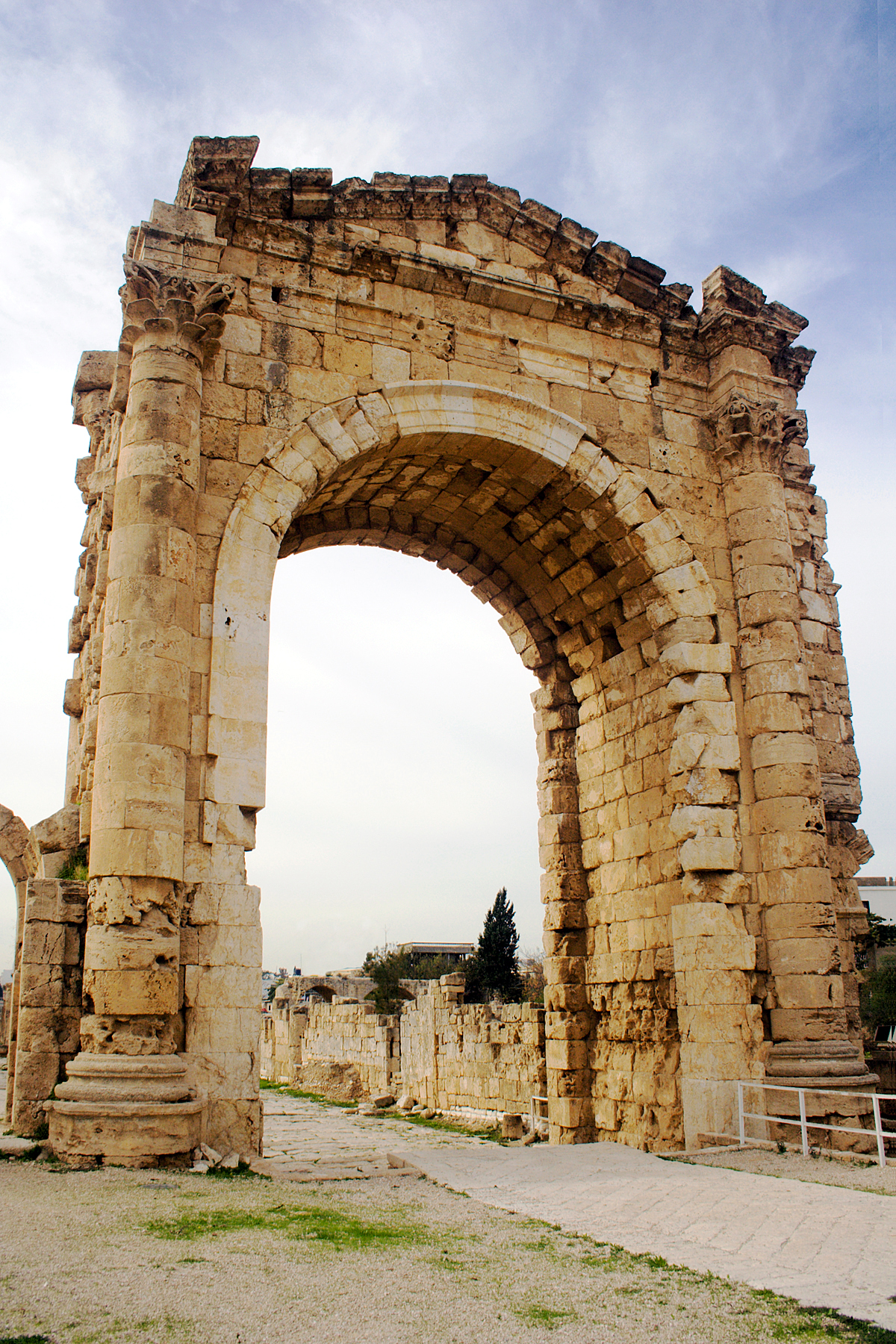
The Triumphal Arch in Tyre

=== Anjar ===
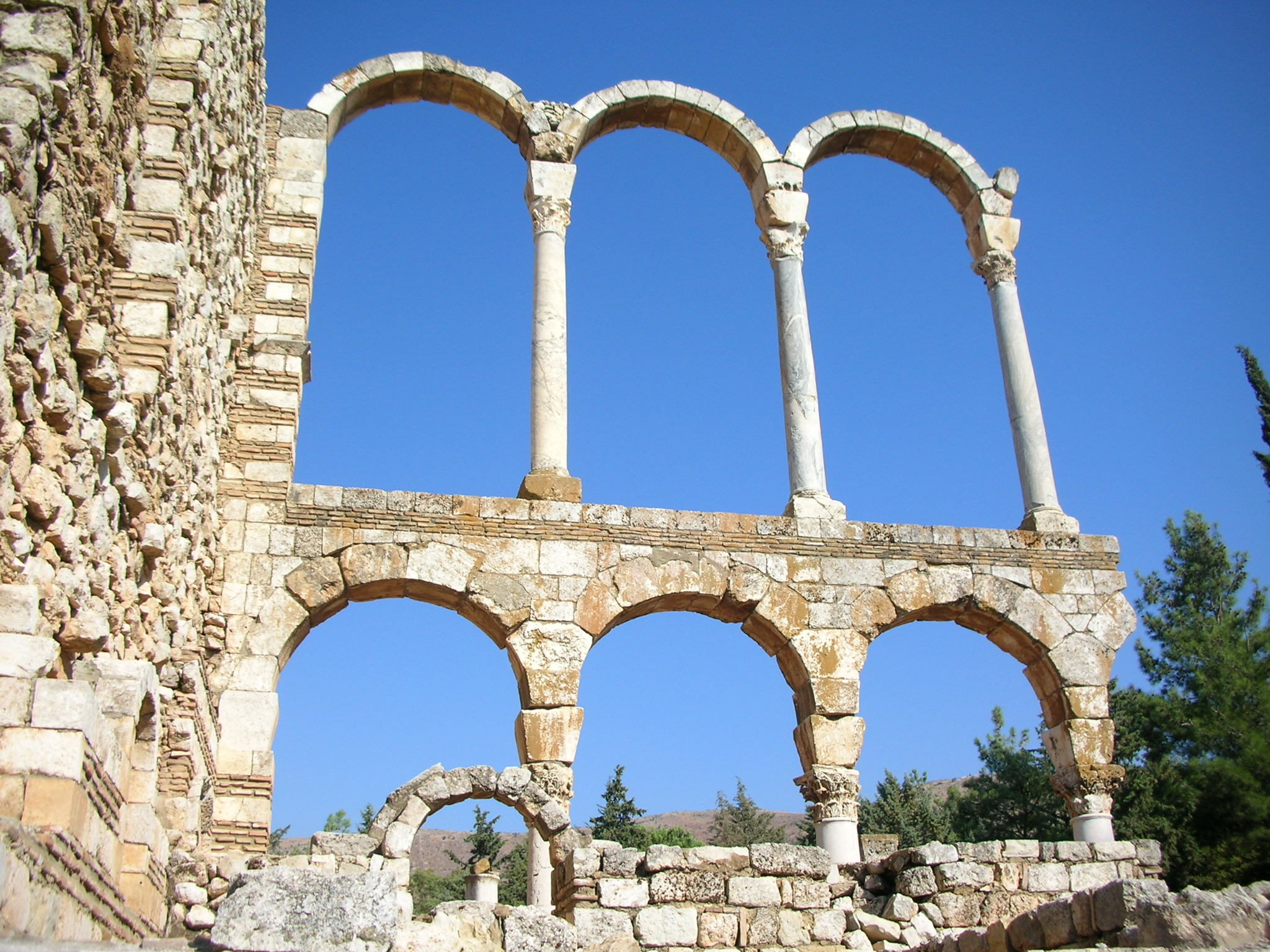
Arches at the ruins of Anjar

Inscribed as a world heritage site in 1984, Anjar was a commercial center for Levantine trade routes. Being only 1,300 years old, Anjar is one of Lebanon's newer archaeological sites. It was founded by the Umayyad Caliph Al-Walid ibn Abdel Malek (in the beginning of the 8th century) and takes its name from the Arabic Ain Gerrah meaning "the source of Gerrah", related to the Umayyad stronghold founded in the same era. The city's wide avenues are lined with mosques, palaces, baths, storehouses, and residences. The city ruins cover 114,000 square meters and are surrounded by large, fortified stone walls, over two meters thick and seven meters high. The rectangular city design is based on Roman city planning and architecture, with stonework and other features borrowed from the Byzantines. Two large avenues – the 20-meter-wide Cardo Maximus, running north to south, and the Decumanus Maximus, running east to west – divide the city into four quadrants. At the crossroads in the center of the city, four great tetrapylons mark the four corners of the intersection.

=== Baalbeck ===
During the Phoenician era, Baalbek was a small village. Little remains of the Phoenician structures of the city, which was later named Heliopolis under the Hellenistic rule and extensively rebuilt by the Romans. After the arrival of the Romans to Phoenicia in 64 B.C., the city was transformed to a celebrated sanctuary where (Jupiter, Venus, and Mercury) and it was overlaid during a period of two centuries by a series of colossal temples. Modern-day visitors to Baalbek can enter the site through the Roman propylaea and walk through the two colonnaded courtyards to reach the complex's temples:

- The Temple of Jupiter was the largest Roman temple ever constructed. Today, just six of the original 54 Corinthian columns remain standing. Each column is 22 meters (66 ft) high and 2 meters (7.5 ft) in diameter, hinting at the temple's size in the time of the Roman Empire.
- The Temple of Bacchus, although smaller than the Temple of Jupiter, is still larger than the Parthenon in Athens. The dedication and purpose of this temple, and its relationship to the rest of the temple complex, are not known.
- The Temple of Venus is a smaller, domed structure set apart to the southeast of the complex. During the Byzantine period, the temple was converted into a church honoring Saint Barbara.
- Only part of the staircase from the Temple of Mercury can still be seen on Sheikh Abdallah hill, a short distance away from the main temple site.

Baalbek was inscribed as a world heritage site in 1984.

=== Byblos ===
Byblos was inscribed as a world heritage site in 1984. Inhabited since the Neolithic age, it witnessed the arrival of successive civilizations, from Phoenicians and Crusaders to Ottoman Turks. Byblos is a historical Mediterranean region dating back thousands of years and closely associated with the spread of the Phoenician alphabet.

The main touristic sites in Byblos:

- Ancient Phoenician Temples, that include the Temple of the Obelisks (also known as the Great Temple or L-Shaped temple), and the Temple of Baalat Gebal.
- St John the Baptist Church, a Crusader church built in 1150.

=== Qadisha Valley and Cedars Forest ===
Inscribed as a world heritage site in 1998, the Qadisha Valley and Cedars Forest (also known as the Forest of the Cedars of God) are considered important. The Qadisha valley was a settlement of early Christian monasticism, situated in a rugged landscape north of the Western Mountain Range of Lebanon. Near the valley lies the Cedars forest, a nature reserve dedicated to the preservation of the last Cedar trees, used in antiquity for the construction of Phoenician boats and religious buildings.

List of monasteries in the Qadisha Valley:

- The Qannubin Monastery, the oldest of the Maronite monasteries in the valley.
- The Monastery of St Anthony of Qozhaya, traditionally founded in the 4th century by St Hilarion.
- The Monastery of Our Lady of Hawqa, founded in the late 13th century by villagers from Hawqa.
- The Monastery of Mar Sarkis, Ehden, successively built in the 8th century, 1198 and 1690.
- The Monastery of Mar Lishaa, comprising a Maronite solitary order and a Barefoot Carmelite order.

Other monasteries consist of the Monastery of Mar Girgis, with the Chapel of Mar Challita, the Monastery of Mar Yuhanna, the Monastery of Mar Abun, with the Hermitage of Mar Sarkis, and the Monastery of Mart Moura, Ehden.

=== Tyre ===
Tyre was inscribed as a world heritage site in 1984. It was the birthplace of the purple dye known as Tyrian purple and had founded several colonies in the Mediterranean such as Carthage and Cádiz. Many civilizations successively settled in Tyre from Phoenicians, Greeks, and Romans to Crusaders and Ottoman Turks. Today, there are still remains mainly from the Roman era.

Major archaeological sites in Tyre:

- Al-Bass site, having a three-bay monumental arch, a necropolis and a hippodrome (all dating from the 2nd century AD to the 6th century AD).
- City site, in the old Phoenician island city, it consists of colonnades, public baths, mosaics, streets, a district of civic buildings and a rectangular arena.

== Ecotourism ==
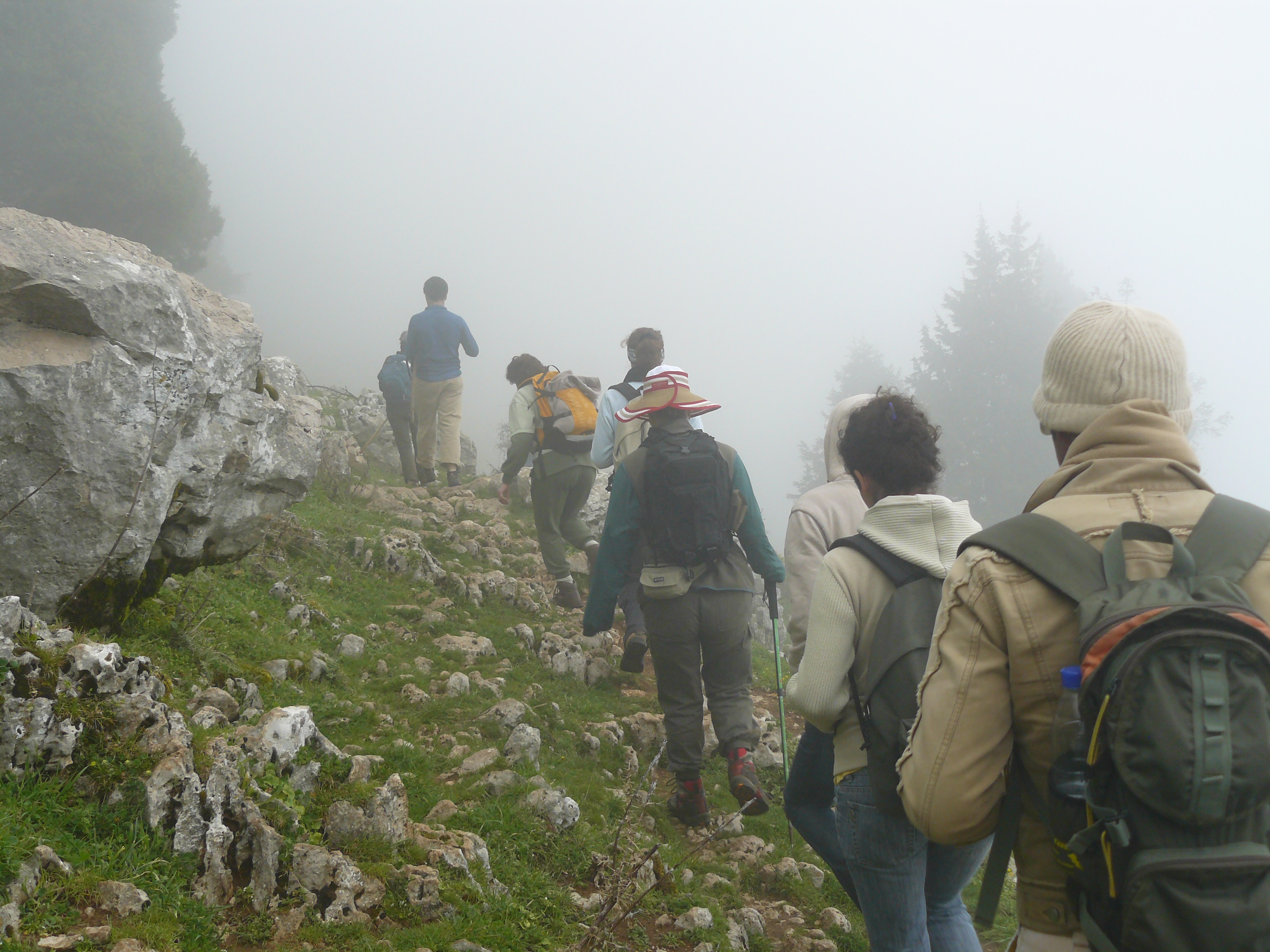
Trekking in the Dinniyeh mountains

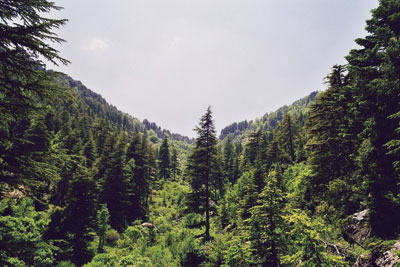
Horsh Ehden nature reserve

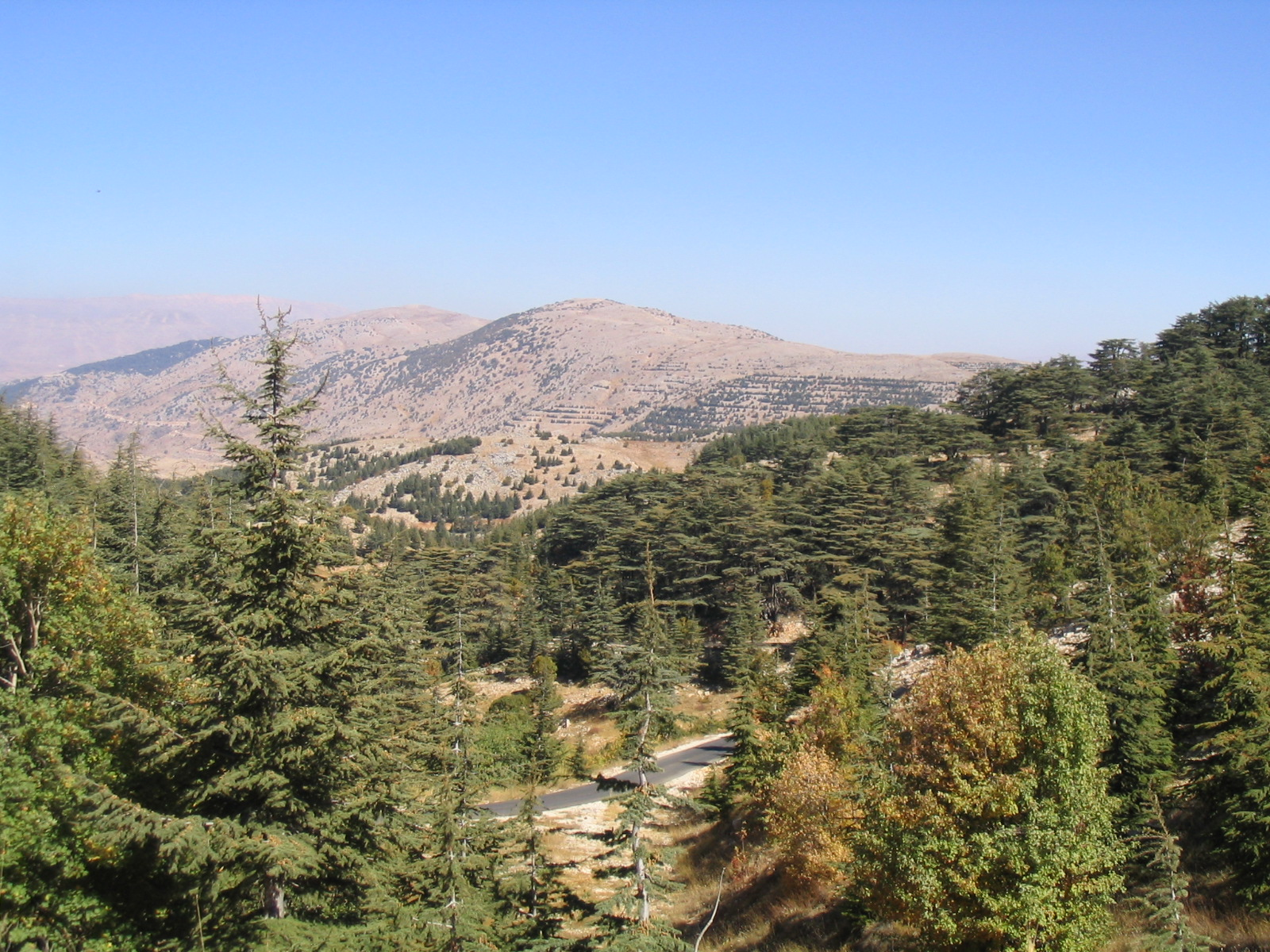
Al Shouf Cedar Nature Reserve

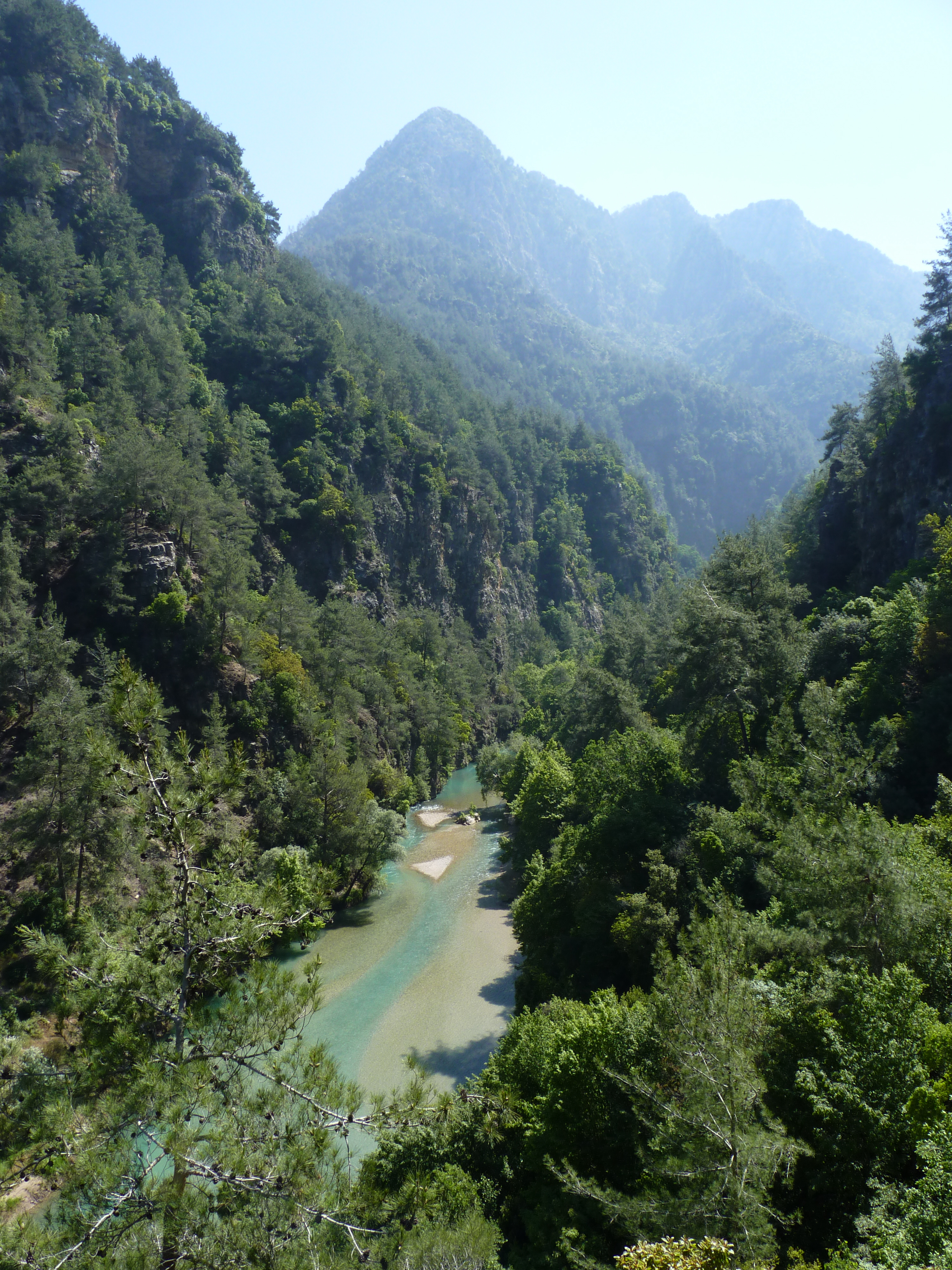
Abraham River

Ecotourism in Lebanon has natural diversity and a range of outdoor activities. With a landscape consisting of mountains, forests, wildlife, beaches, snow-fed rivers, caves, valleys, and gorges, Lebanon is becoming more of an outdoor destination where people can visit its natural reserves and practice their ecotourism activities.

Ecotourism activities and sports:

- ATV (All-terrain vehicle)
- Rafting
- Hiking
- Caving
- Dirt biking
- Via Ferrata
- Rappelling
- Horse riding
- Snowboarding
- Mountain biking
- Mountain climbing

Natural reserves:

- Al Shouf Cedar Nature Reserve
- Horsh Ehden Nature Reserve
- Palm Islands Nature Reserve

=== Outdoors ===
Lebanon's nature and geography allow the practice of outdoor activities (mainly concentrated in the summer season). These activities are gaining more interest from nature lovers.

Outdoor activities:

- Camping, between the months of May and September.
- Caving, a natural heritage
- Cycling, an activity of recent interest.
- Hiking, with a number of trails (some hiking locations are Al Shouf Cedar Nature Reserve, the Horsh Ehden reserve and Nahr Ibrahim).
- Paragliding, at The Cedars, Ehden, Miziara, Harissa, Barouk and Faraya.
- Rafting, recently introduced in locations like the Litani and the Awali rivers.
- Motorcycle riding, different motorcycle clubs organize rides throughout the country.

=== Winter sports ===
Winter sports are becoming more in demand due to the close geographical location of the mountain peaks from the Mediterranean sea. Winter sports include Alpine skiing and Cross Country in addition to paragliding, snowmobiling, and hiking.

== Leisure ==
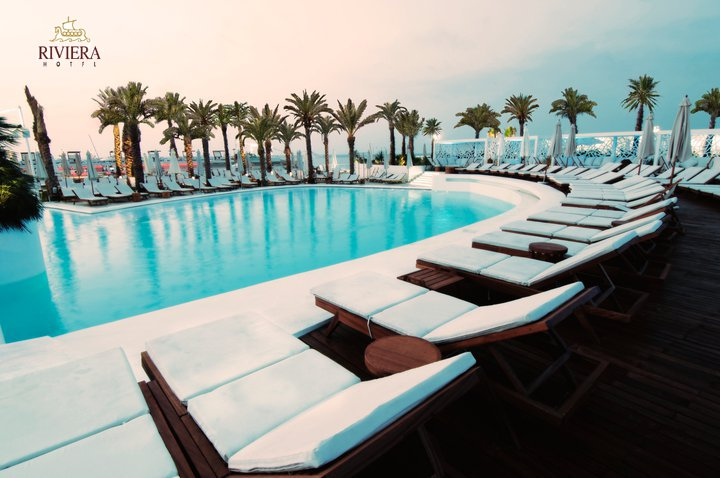
Riviera Beach and Hotel Resort

Lebanon has a 200 km of seashore with about 300 days of sunshine a year, making it a favorable destination for leisure and activities.

Beaches and water parks: Orchid Beach Resort

Art galleries: Zamaan Gallery - includes a collection of paintings by Lebanese and Middle Eastern artists (www.zamaangallery.com)

Lebanon has a lottery system and Loto, operated by La Libanaise Des Jeux Official La Libanaise des Jeux.

== Cuisine ==
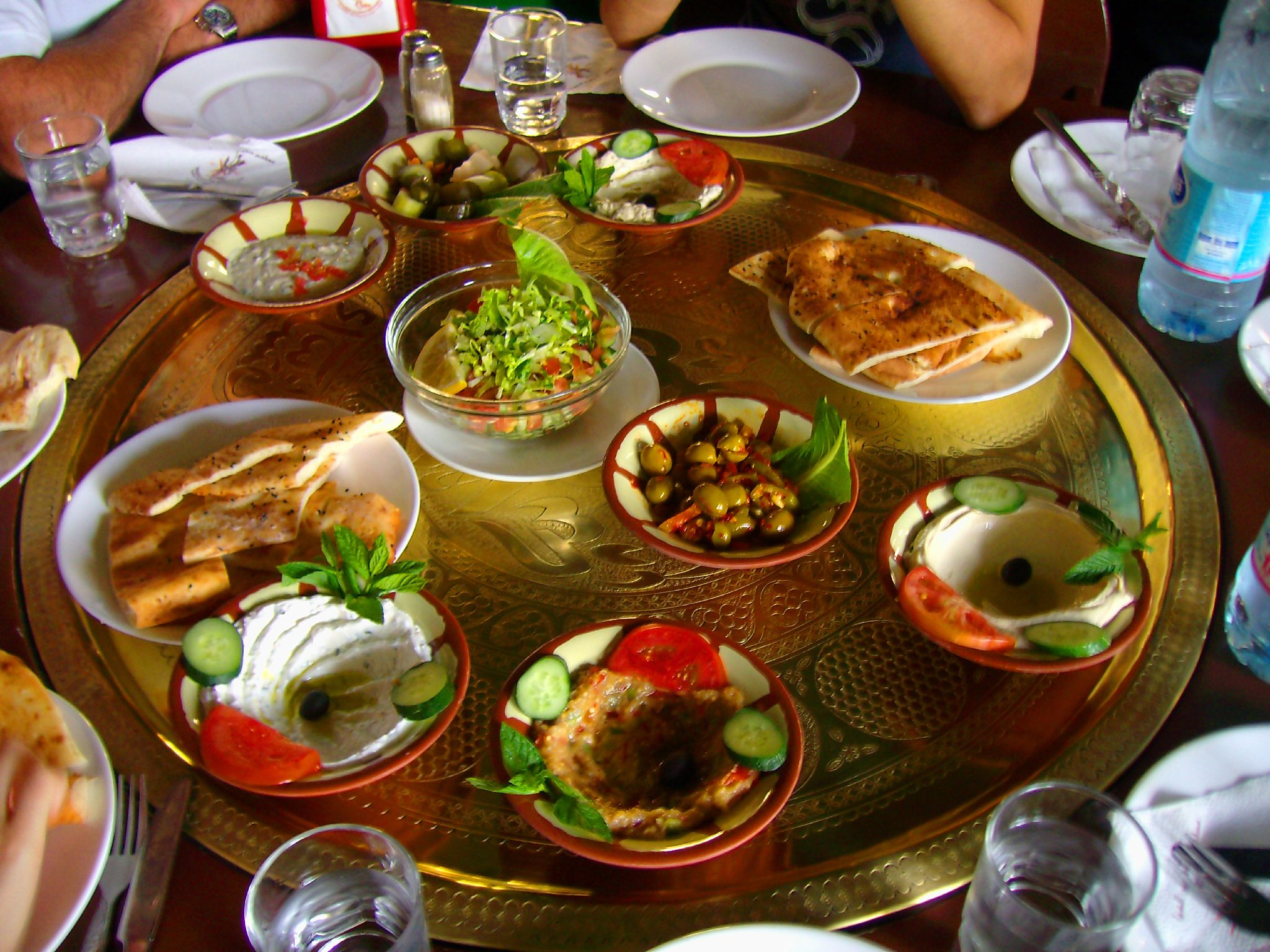
A typical Lebanese mezze

The Lebanese cuisine, resembling Levantine cuisine with its own unique distinctions, combines the ingredients of the Middle and Far East with European cuisine. Its history dates back to pre-biblical times. Lebanese Restaurants: Mounir, Karamna, Leila, Al Balad, Kababji, and Al Halabi

== Crafts ==
The production method of Lebanese crafts is mainly concentrated in small villages where the old skills are handed from generation to generation, produced from local raw materials. Different regions of the country specialize in various handicrafts such as basketry, carpet weaving, ceramics and pottery, copper and metalworking, embroidery, glass blowing, and gold and silver smithing. Some Lebanese villages are also known for their church bells.

== Tourist destinations ==
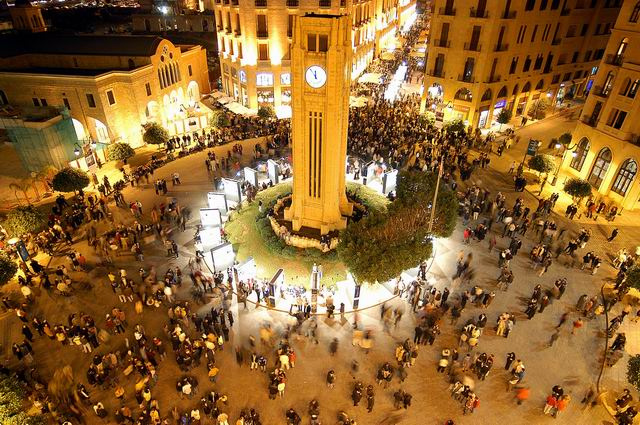
Nejmeh square in Beirut Central District

- Sidon, a 6,000-year-old city on the southern coast of Lebanon. Attractions include the Sidon Soap Museum, Sidon Sea Castle, Our Lady of Mantara, and Eshmun Temple
- Mzaar Kfardebian, a ski area and mountain resort.
- Beirut, the capital city which features nightlife, restaurants, and the Raouche rock
- Harissa, where visitors can take the Téléférique up Mount Harissa to visit Our Lady of Lebanon.
- Jeita Grotto, a limestone cave
- Beiteddine, a small city in Chouf which hosts the Beiteddine Palace and the Beiteddine Festival.
- Batroun, a small city in north Lebanon which has the Mseilha Fort built by the Crusaders.
- Tripoli, Lebanon, the second largest city which has seen many empires, with a souk, the 5,000-year-old Tripoli Castle, and one of the oldest ports in the world in its neighboring city El Mina.
- The Beirut Central District used to be the beating heart of the city but is hardly gaining its old status. Home to historical sites, and rebuilt after the end of the civil war, the BCD has hotels, restaurants, and shops. During the summer, the squares and parks turn into open-air concert halls, but after office hours the district streets are empty.
- The lively neighbourhoods are Badaro, Hamra, Gemmayzeh and Mar Mikhaël.
- Byblos is known for its ruins and citadels, souk, port, beaches, museums, and more recently its nightlife. Byblos also hosts Byblos International Festival yearly, the biggest festival in Lebanon.
- Ehden, a mountain town located in the North Governorate, at an altitude of 1450 meters, is mostly visited by Lebanese tourists. Ehden is home to the first Maronite church in Lebanon. Ehden is also home to the biggest nature reserves in Lebanon, the Horsh Ehden.

== Festivals ==
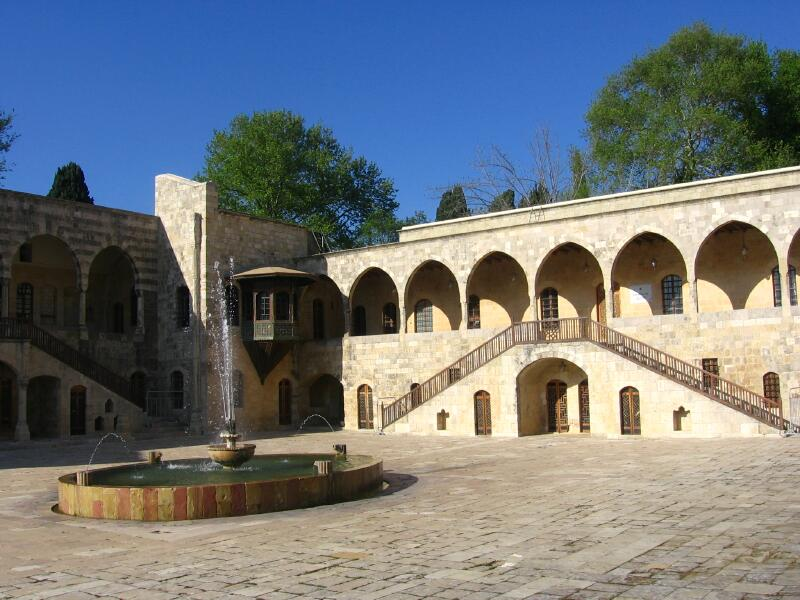
Inner courtyard of the Beiteddine palace where the Beiteddine Festival takes place.

There is a range of festivals that take place in Lebanon, especially in the summer where festivities including both Lebanese and international performers take place in archaeological and historical sites, including Baalbek, Byblos, and Beiteddine.

Major festivals: Baalbeck International Festival, Beiteddine Festival, and Byblos International Festival.

== Statistics and economy ==
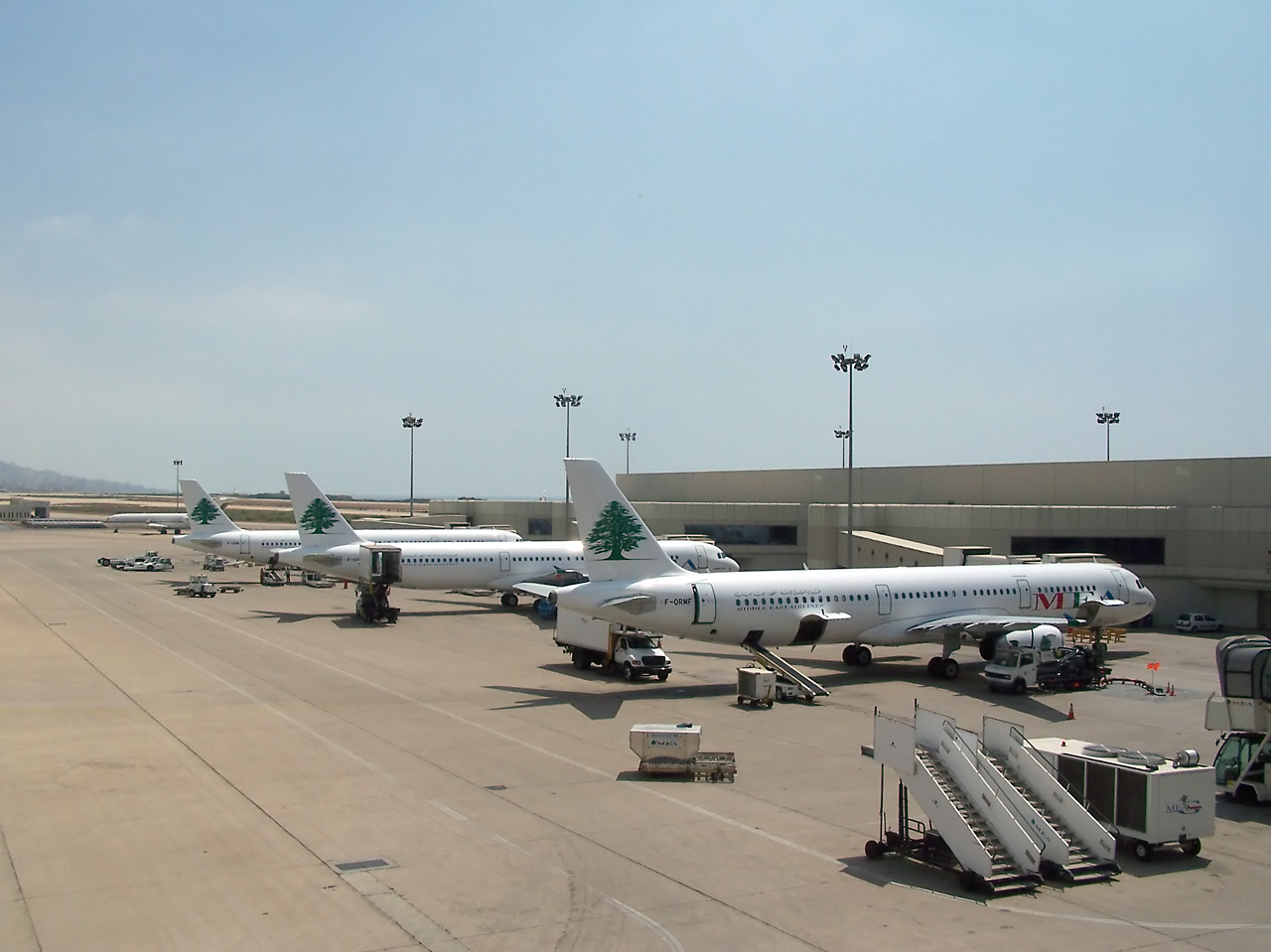
3 MEA Airbus A321s parked at the west wing of Beirut Rafic Hariri International Airport

Tourism was once a very important contributor to Lebanon's economy, accounting for almost 20 percent of the GDP in the 2 decades before the start of the Lebanese civil war. Since the end of the war, the sector has managed to revive somewhat, but tourism has yet to return to its pre-war levels. Tourism in 1999 accounted for 9 percent of the GDP. In 2001, the tourism sector was one of the fastest growing sectors of the economy, with the number of tourists visiting Lebanon between 1996 and 2000 growing at the rate of 14 percent annually. In 2003 the tourism industry contributed 6.374 billion U.S. dollars to the Lebanese economy and in 2005 the receipts per capita reached 1,433 U.S. dollars. In 2006 the ministry of Tourism counted 373,037 admissions to the country's main ministry run touristic sites. In 2009, Lebanon hosted about two million tourists, a record number, passing the previous 1974 record of 1.4 million tourists. The number of tourists grew by 39% over the previous year, the largest increase in any country according to the World Tourism Organization. Most of the increase is due to heightened political stability and security. Lebanon was also featured by several international media outlets, including the New York Times, CNN, and Paris Match, as a top tourist destination at the beginning of 2009. Lebanon's annual income from tourism reached $7 billion, about 20 percent of its gross domestic product, according to the Minister of Tourism. Despite the recent surge in popularity as a tourist destination, the United States along with a number of other countries continue to urge their citizens to avoid all travel to Lebanon due to current safety and security concerns. The Beirut Museum of Art, or BeMA, is scheduled to open in 2026 and to feature Lebanese art that has been produced from the 19th century to the present.

=== 1995-2011 ===
Year	International Tourist Arrivals	Market share in the Middle East
1995	450,000	
2000	472,000	3.1%
2003	1,016,000	
2004	1,278,000	
2005	1,140,000	2.9%
2010	2,351,081	
2011	2,001,811	

On August 16, 2015, during the 7th session of the Joint Jordanian-Lebanese Higher Committee, Lebanese and Jordanian officials signed a five-year tourism partnership program which includes efforts to promote tourism in both countries.

== Arrivals by country ==
Most visitors arriving to Lebanon were from the following countries of nationality:

Country	2020	2019	2018	2017	2016	2015	2014	2013	2012
Syria	▼552,179	▼2,421,346	▲2,687,509	▲2,377,368	▼1,802,598	▼1,956,194	▼3,614,539	▲4,459,842	4,116,463
Iraq	▼52,903	▼196,265	▼211,589	▼226,930	▲236,013	▲191,578	▲189,156	▲141,986	126,982
France	▼46,219	▼181,127	▲181,321	▲164,924	▲145,666	▲134,181	▲120,710	▼117,688	120,134
United States	▼38,104	▲192,671	▲190,464	▲171,110	▲154,095	▲135,606	▲114,015	▼103,483	110,539
Germany	▼30,083	▲106,379	▲104,167	▲96,711	▲87,567	▲74,823	▲67,988	▼61,123	62,160
Egypt	▼23,364	▲92,533	▲92,173	▼82,282	▲83,337	▲75,524	▲69,179	▼63,578	64,017
Canada	▼22,664	▼113,063	▲114,137	▲107,713	▲100, 076	▲91,324	▲78,419	▼71,841	75,751
Jordan	▼13,245	▼87,447	▲92,920	▲90,077	▲86,693	▲77,960	▼73,822	▼78,018	89,100
United Kingdom	▼16,979	▼74,177	▲75,309	▲68,360	▲61,994	▲56,608	▲49,179	▼48,504	50,214
Sweden	▼11,993	▲47,153	▲44,032	▲38,958	▲34,722	▲28,376	▲26,031	▼24,011	24,340
Turkey	▼9,266	▲33,850	▲32,744	▲29,839	▲25,487	▲21,027	▼16,126	▼23,823	28,850
Australia	▼8,265	▼75,589	▲84,218	▲78,664	▲72,743	▲57,852	▲48,467	▼43,560	50,261
Total	▼965,733	▼4,357,666	▲4,651,399	▲4,234,163	▲4,179,966	▼3,474,121	▼4,969,186	▲5,734,204	5,482,308

== Bibliography ==
- Dewailly B., 2007, « Du cas et des “K” touristiques libanais : une communication géographique » , in Villes et Territoires du Moyen-Orient, Institut Français du Proche-Orient, Beyrouth, mars, n° 3, on Hal-SHS.
- Dewailly B. et Ovazza J.-M., 2009, "Le tourisme au Liban : quand l’action ne fait plus système", in Berriane M. (Ed.), Tourisme des nationaux, tourisme des étrangers : quelles articulations en Méditerranée ?, Rabat University Press, Faculté des Lettres et des Sciences Humaines and European Research Institute, Florence, Italy, 277 p. ISBN 978-2-35604-098-5 - PDF preprint version 2004 on Hal-SHS.
- Dewailly B. et Ovazza J.-M., 2009, " Les complexes balnéaires privés au Liban. Quels lieux touristiques en émergence ?", in Berriane M. (Ed.), Tourisme des nationaux, tourisme des étrangers : quelles articulations en Méditerranée ?, Rabat University Press, Faculté des Lettres et des Sciences Humaines and European Research Institute, Florence, Italy, 277 p. ISBN 978-2-35604-098-5 - PDF preprint version 2004 on Hal-SHS.
- Ministère libanais du tourisme, 1995, Le Liban – Un Avenir – Le Tourisme, Plan de Reconstruction et de Développement Touristiques du Liban, République Libanaise, Organisation Mondiale du Tourisme, République Française, Programme des Nations-Unies pour le Développement.

== See also ==
- Beirut Heritage Trail
- Constitution of Lebanon
- Driving licence in Lebanon
- Foreign relations of Lebanon
- History of Lebanon
- Lebanese diaspora
- Lebanese identity card
- Lebanese passport
- Politics of Lebanon
- Vehicle registration plates of Lebanon
- Visa policy of Lebanon
- Visa requirements for Lebanese citizens
