= Ameen Rihani Museum =

Biographical museum in Freike, Lebanon

Ameen Rihani Museum متحف أمين الريحاني
- Established: 1953; 73 years ago
- Location: Lebanon
- Coordinates: 33.9364°N 35.6552°E
- Website: http://www.ameenrihani.org/

The Ameen Rihani Museum is a museum in Freike, Lebanon dedicated to the Lebanese-American writer and thinker Ameen Rihani. The museum was established in 1953 by his brother Albert Rihani. It occupies the lower level of the Rihani home.

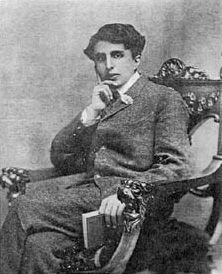
Ameen Rihani

== See also ==
- List of museums in Lebanon
