= Lebanese Marine and Wildlife Museum =

- Location within Lebanon
- Established: 2001
- Location: Jeita, Lebanon
- Coordinates: 33.9484615°N 35.6355729°E
- Type: Zoological museum
- Website: lmwm.org

The Lebanese Marine and Wildlife Museum (Arabic: المتحف اللبناني للحياة البحرية و البرية, al-matḥaf al-lubnani lil-hayat al-bahriya wa al-bariya) is a zoological museum in Jeita. Its goals are to study Lebanon's ecosystem, encourage preservation, and maintain a scientific archive of Lebanon's wildlife and Mediterranean marine life.

== History ==
The Museum was first opened in Tyre in 2001.

== Collections ==
The Lebanese Marine and Wildlife Museum has over 2000 species with over 5000 specimen. The museum currently contains 6 Exhibits:

=== Mammals ===
Displaying over 30 of Lebanon's mammals which once roamed freely the forests of Lebanon, most of which are now critically endangered, due to deforestation, indiscriminate hunting and habitat destruction.

=== Birds ===
The Museum Has over 200 species of birds

=== Reptiles ===
over 20 species of lizards and 30 species of snakes

=== Minerals, Gems and Fossils ===
over 300 specimens of minerals and gems

=== Seashells ===
The seashell collections contains over 200 seashell species from the Mediterranean and over 300 of the largest seashells from around the world.

=== Marine life ===
This display contains over 40 species sharks, in additions to fish, crabs, cephalopods, crustaceans, sea turtles, dolphins and a monk seal.

== Location and facilities ==
The museum is located in Jeita.
