= Byblos Fossil Museum =

Museum in Byblos, Lebanon

Coordinates: 34.12083°N 35.64551°E

The Byblos Fossil Museum (a.k.a. Memory of Time) is a museum in Byblos, Lebanon. This museum contains fossil collections of sharks, eels, shrimps, squids, rays, coelacanthes and flying fish. It was opened in 1991 and is in the old souk of Byblos. Most of its collection comes from the nearby villages of Haqel-Byblos, Hjula, and Ennammoura. Some of the bony fish fossil genera that can be seen at the museum are: Apateopholis, Belonostomus, the cephalopod genera, Coccodus, and Ctenothrissa.

== See also ==
- List of prehistoric bony fish
