= Byblos Wax Museum =

Wax museum in Byblos, Lebanon

- Former name: 34° 7' 20.0856 N 35° 38' 45.384 E
- Location: Byblos
- Coordinates: 34°7′20.0856″N 35°38′45.384″E
- Type: Wax museum

The Byblos Wax Museum (Arabic: متحف الشمع في جبيل) is a wax museum in Byblos, Lebanon. It displays wax statues and life scenes from the Phoenician era to the modern times.

== Some of the wax figures ==
- Cadmus
- Europa
- Adonis
- Ahiram
- Bashir Shihab II
- Ibrahim Pacha
- Gibran Khalil Gibran
- Hassan Kamel Al-Sabbah
- Bechara El Khoury
- Adil Osseiran
- Riad Solh
- Sabah

In addition, there are statues of public figures depicting Phoenicians manufacturing glass, building ships and producing purple dye, and a Lebanese wedding in the village.
