= Audi Soap Museum =

Soap Museum

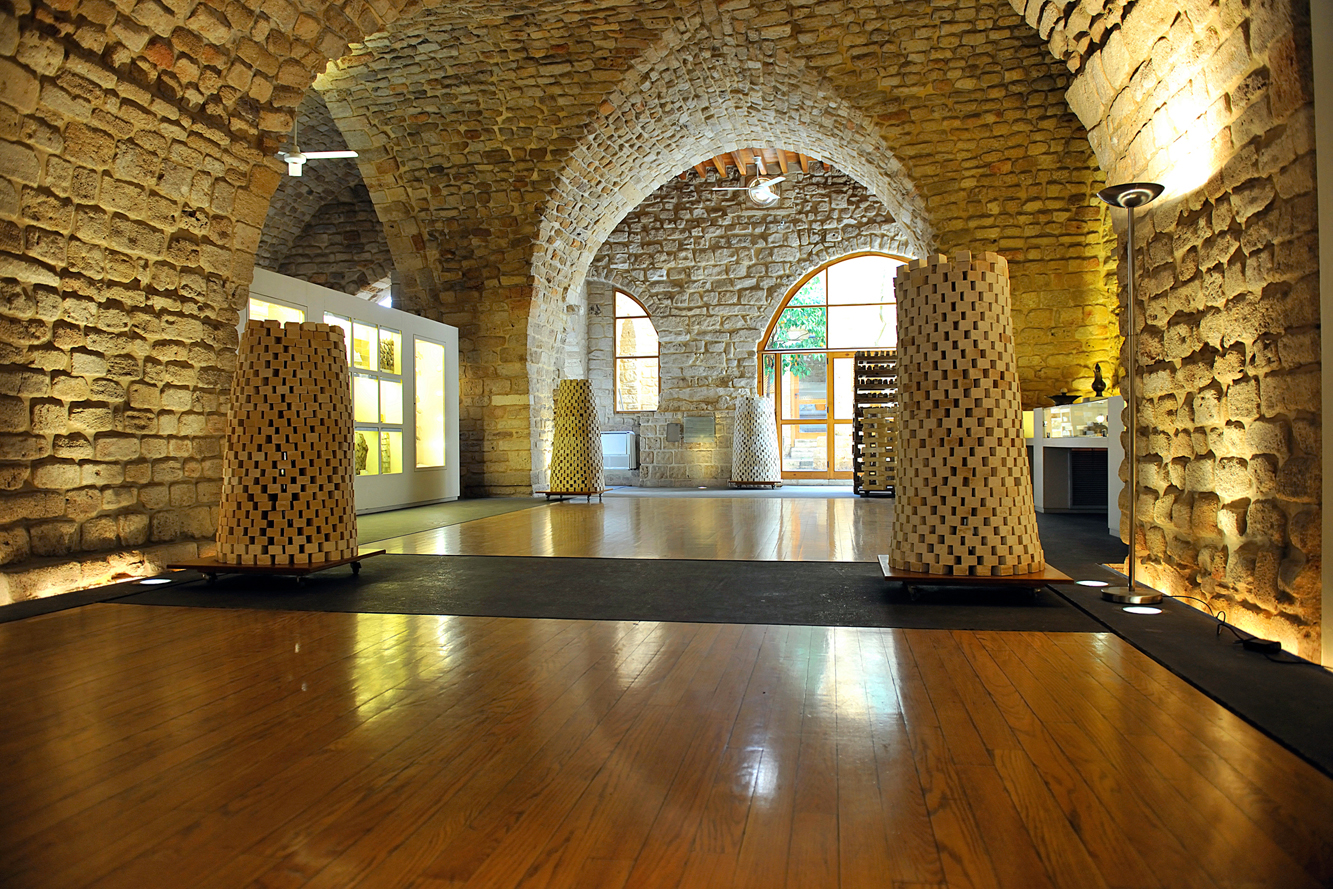
- Interior of the Museum.

- Location within Lebanon
- Established: 1 November 2000
- Location: Sidon, Lebanon
- Coordinates: 33°33′46″N 35°22′17″E
- Type: Soap museum
- Founder: Audi Foundation
- Owner: Audi Foundation
- Website: www.audifoundation.org.lb

The Soap Museum (Arabic: متحف الصابون, also called the Audi Soap Museum) is a museum based in a historic soap factory in Sidon, Lebanon specialized in Levantine soaps. It opened in November 2000 and is managed by the Audi Foundation.

== History ==
The soap workshop was originally built in Sidon by the Hammoud family in the 17th century. During the 19th century (around 1880), the Audi family became the owner of the soap workshop and turned it into a family residence. It was abandoned in the 1980s when the Lebanon War broke out, and the ground floor was occupied by refugees. In 1996, the Audi Family started to restore the building. The Soap Museum opened in November 2000 and Raymond Audi launched the Audi Foundation, to promote craftmanship in Lebanon.

In November 2019, the museum opened a gift shop in Beyrouth selling luxury olive oil soaps.

== Description ==
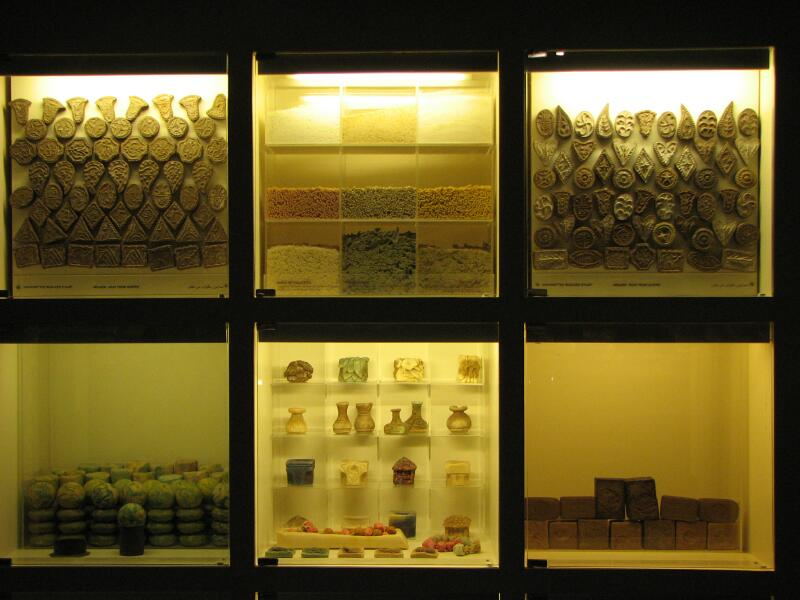
Soap on display inside Sidon Soap Museum.

The Soap Museum traces the history of soap making in the region, its development, and manufacturing techniques.

A historical section of the museum introduces artifacts which were found during onsite excavation. The Museum building is an old soap factory built in the 17th century, although containing parts thought to date back to the 13th century.

The Audi Foundation is headquartered at the Soap Museum. The foundation works with the Mahmud al-Sharkass and his family, who have been making soap for seven generations, to craft luxury soaps sold in the museum's gift shop. Mahmud is able to make around 100 soaps by hand every day, which are made from olive oil and laurel oil.

== Bibliography ==
- The Olive Oil Soap - The Soap Museum, Fondation Audi, 2003
