= Lebanese Heritage Museum =

Museum in Jounieh, Lebanon

Lebanese Heritage Museum متحف التراث اللبناني
- Established: 2003
- Location: Jounieh, Keserwan; Mount Lebanon
- Website: www.lebaneseheritagemuseum.org

The Lebanese Heritage Museum is a museum in Jounieh, Lebanon. It contains objects related to the history and culture of Lebanon from the Phoenician era to modern times.
