= Youssef Bey Karam =

Lebanese Maronite (1823–1889)

- يوسف بك كرم
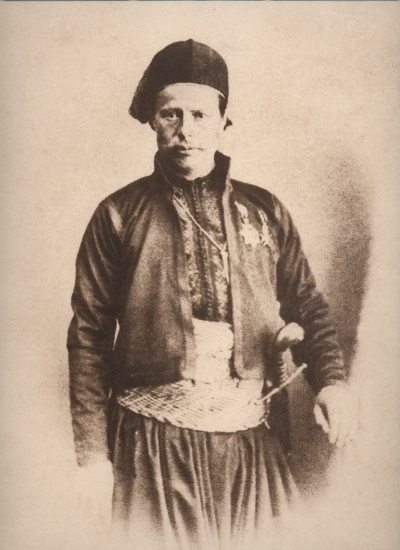

Personal details
- Born: 15 May 1823 Ehden, Ottoman Lebanon
- Died: 7 April 1889 (aged 65) Naples, Italy
- Parents: Sheikh Boutros Karam (father); Mariam Antonios Abi Khattar (mother)
- Relatives: Salim Bey Karam
- Website: youssefbeykaram.org

Governor of Ehden
- In office 1846–1861

Christian Kaymakam
- In office 17 November 1860 – 9 June 1861

Youssef Bey Karam (Arabic: يوسف بك كرم, romanized: Yūsuf Bik Karam; 15 May 1823 – 7 April 1889) was a Lebanese Maronite notable for fighting in the 1860 civil conflict and leading a rebellion in 1866–1867 against Ottoman rule in Mount Lebanon. His proclamations have been interpreted as an early expression of Lebanese nationalism.

== Early life ==
Youssef Karam was born on 15 May 1823, to Sheikh Boutros Karam, and Mariam (daughter of Sheikh Antonios Abi Khattar Al Ayntourini) in Ehden, Lebanon. Raised in a family of six children: Catherine, Teresa, Rose, Eva, Mikhail and Youssef. His mother was strong, virtuous, possessed a strong personality; and had a strong influence on her son.

Youssef was a smart boy, with green eyes and fair complexion. He loved his hometown Ehden, with its majestic mountains and thick forests. He was French educated and at the age of 7, he was well versed in Arabic, French, Italian and Syriac languages. He trained in unarmed combat, horse riding, shooting and fencing. His education in French helped him establish strong links with the west, especially France. Youssef has a special appreciation of Arabic, which was exemplified in many poetic writings.

His father also decided to teach him the equestrian art. Sheikh Imad El Hachem from Aqoura, Byblos taught him swordsmanship and shooting. According to his teachers, Karam was excellent at horsemanship, equestrian art and fighting with nude sticks of palm. He fought Youssef Agha Chantiri at Prince Bachir Square in Bekfaya, the prince Ali Mansour Abillamah and Hanna Bey Abi Saab at the Prince Square in Broumana, and snatched victory from the three.

== Biography ==
In 1840, Youssef aged 17 years, fought alongside his father and elder brother against the Egyptian armies then occupying Lebanon in the battles of Houna and Bazoun. Youssef showed remarkable skill as a warrior and leader, and his reputation and influence in the area steadily grew; so much so that in 1846, when his father died, Youssef succeeded him as ruler instead of his elder brother. Youssef ruled with fairness, and his credibility and influence as a soldier and politician continued to grow.

Youssef Karam became the acknowledged leader of the district, and in time one of the most powerful personalities in Lebanese Politics. And although politically and militarily very powerful, he remained ever loyal to his faith and to the Church. Karam's loyalty to the Church and to Bkerke, the seat of the Maronite Patriarch, never wavered, and this loyalty was to have far reaching implications in future years.

In 1858, when Tanyus Shahin and the farmers of the predominantly Maronite Keserwan District staged an uprising against their Maronite Sheikhs and landlords, the Khazen family, the Maronite Patriarch, conscious of Karam's influence and his loyalty to the Church, appealed to Karam to save the Sheikhs and restore peace to the area. Together, they negotiated a settlement to the conflict, but the class division in feudal Kesrawan remained.

Future conflicts however, were not to be so peacefully settled. During that period, when the Ottomans ruled Lebanon, there existed a certain amount of distrust between the Druze and Maronite Communities. The Druze felt threatened by the growing presence of the Christians Maronites in their traditional area of Mount Lebanon. The suspicion and distrust between the two Communities was allowed to be fueled by petty and personal conflicts until September 1859 when finally open conflict broke out between the Druze and Maronite Communities at Beit Mery, a town of different religious denominations. Karam reacted by calling a meeting of Community leaders at the village of Baan, and concluded an agreement with the Muslim ruler of Tripoli, Abed El Hamid Karami, to keep North Lebanon free from any religious conflict.

In May 1860, however, conflict again broke out between the two Communities, and a number of Maronite Monks and villagers were massacred. This time Karam reacted by raising an army of 500 men to protect the Maronites in the Mount Lebanon area. On 2 June 1860, Karam and his men marched to Bkerke and offered to the Maronite Patriarch their protection of Maronites.

In Karam's mind however, there was no doubt that the conflict between the Druze and the Maronites was being nurtured by Khorshid Pasha, the Ottoman Governor. Khourshid's culpability in the massacres is debated, as he had previously urged the British to stop arming Druze groups and the French to stop arming the Maronites. Khorshid Pasha saw Karam's calls for Lebanese self-rule as a threat to Turkish interests in Lebanon and the area, and convinced the European Ambassadors that Turkish presence in Lebanon was essential to maintain peace between warring factions in Lebanon. The French Ambassador to Lebanon convinced Karam to halt his march at Bikfaya, near Keserwan, in return for guarantees of safety for all Christians offered by Khorshid.

Several days later however, Christian villages were attacked by Druzes from Mount Lebanon and the Hawran. Karam and his men retaliated against Druze and Turkish forces, and succeeded in saving the majority of Christian towns and villages in the Keserwan area. Christian presence in the area was therefore established. Eventually, French ships reached the port of Beirut with supplies and the Turkish sea blockade ended. Peace was then restored whilst a new constitution was drafted to provide how Lebanon was to be governed. In the interim, two provisional Governors were appointed to rule Lebanon, one to rule Christians and the other to rule the Druze and Muslims. Karam was appointed the Christian Kaymakamate (Kaymakam) on 17 November 1860 until the 1861 agreement of the Reglement Organique, which would establish a single governor for the whole mountain. Again, Karam ruled with distinction, restoring law and order, re-organising public institutions and conducting an honest government. French occupied Beirut and parts of Mount Lebanon until mid-1861. As Kaymakam, Karam tendered his resignation a number of times in protest against what the new institutional system devised the Organic Law in 1861 and 1864. The new statute created a substantial autonomy for Mount Lebanon within the Ottoman Empire. Executive powers were vested in an Ottoman governor of Catholic religion, nominated by the Sublime Porte and the representatives of European powers.

== First exile ==
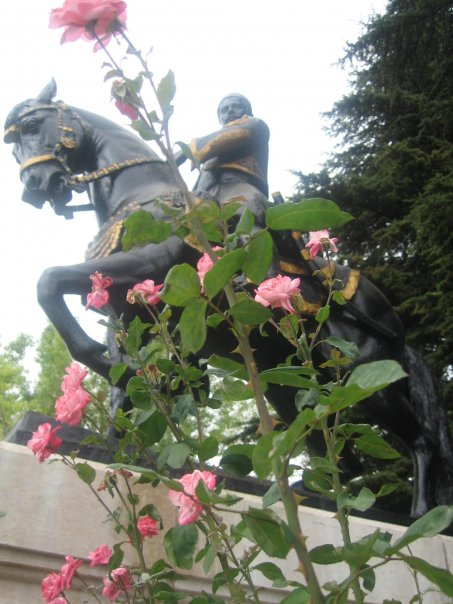
Youssef Bey Karam Statue

Opposing the new internationally sanctioned status quo, and angered at the idea that the new governor would not be a native, Karam refused to stick to the Organic Law, insisting for complete home rule for Mount Lebanon. The first governor Daud Pasha then issued an order exiling Karam to Turkey, where he remained until 1864.

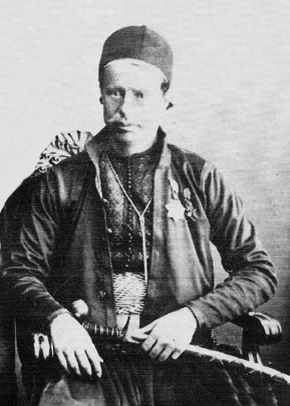
Youssef Bey Karam

After he was allowed to return to his hometown, Karam championed the end of the mutasarrifiya (autonomous province) system, the abolition of levies, and the redeployment of Ottoman troops out of Mount Lebanon.

Many battles followed, one of the earliest being at Maameltein, Jounieh on 6 January 1866. There Karam was attending Mass at St. Doumit Church when regular Ottoman troops attacked his men stationed outside the Church. A fierce battle followed, and Karam, aided by neighbouring villagers, defeated the Ottoman troops. Karam immediately wrote to Istanbul and European Governments detailing the causes of conflict, and claiming his people's right to defend themselves.

Daud Pasha however, was determined to rid himself of Karam and deal a fatal blow to the Lebanese nationalist movement. Subsequently, Karam settled down in the village of Bnachii with his 800 armed fighters. On January 21, the commander Amine Pasha entered Zgharta leading 3800 soldiers affiliated to the regime, 300 from Dragoon and 200 from Cossacks. The Medical Commander joined Amine Pasha along with 800 Lebanese soldiers and armies from Tripoli, which follow the regime. Amine Pasha, his officers and his chiefs of staff took off the doors of Youssef Bey Karam's house and resided there. On January 25, Amine Pasha left Zgharta with his soldiers, after having burnt many of its houses. The following day, Amine Pasha called Karam to meet him in Saint Jacob in Karmsaddeh. Karam accepted and was there in the morning of the 27th of the month. He showed his submission and put his sword between the hands of Amine Pasha as a sign of respect for the Turkish authority. The commander understood then, that Karam was not revolting against the government. Nevertheless, this meeting did not come to a happy end, since Daoud Pasha refused all the settlements between him and Karam.

Thus, Amine Pasha ordered his soldiers to eliminate Karam. Regime's armies reached Bnachii. They were around ten thousand soldiers. The first moment he saw from afar the dust caused by the horses and the sparkle of the swords, Karam ordered his men to go hide and hole up behind rocks, so they can counterattack the enemy. Karam and his friends were valiant, skilled and courageous. They fought desperately in a battle which lasted 12 hours; the fact that surprised the enemy. Karam defeated the army and snatched the victory. Enemies lost about a thousand soldiers, between dead and injured. As for Karam and his friends, they took 600 rifles and 30 barrels of gunpowder. Unfortunately, seven of Karam's friends were killed during the combat.

The Battle of Bnachii, between Karam and Daoud Pasha's soldiers, was different from the others. A battle where courage beat the huge number of soldiers: the skilful and well trained Aramram army against a horde of Ehdeniens. This horde did not have ammunitions or new weapons, but the only thing that was encouraging it was its deep love for Lebanon and its intent to defend its rights.

In Beirut however, Daud Pasha rallied support from the European ambassadors, who actively opposed Karam and refused to recognize any government he may form.

== Second exile ==
At a meeting at Bkerke, the French Ambassador ordered Karam in the name of Napoleon III, to leave Lebanon in return for French guarantees of safety for his men and entourage. Karam was warned that to refuse would mean to place his men and the welfare of his people in jeopardy. On Thursday 31 January 1867, Karam left Lebanon on board a French ship bound for Algeria.

Karam traveled from Algeria to European capitals explaining the plight of the Lebanese people and stressing their desire to form a sovereign and independent state. Whilst there, he wrote many letters and memoirs in support of self-rule for Lebanon. Most of his writings have survived to this day.

Karam also traveled to European capitals seeking economic help for Lebanon. He offered to mortgage all his personal Lebanese holdings, amounting to five million francs, to French businessmen in return for the establishment of coal mines and a railroad network in Lebanon.

== Death ==
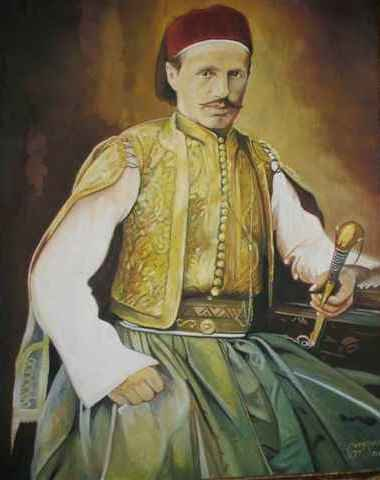
Youssef Bey Karam Painting

On April 4, 1889, Karam suffered from pneumonia worse than the first one. He called his private doctor Paul Shanize who examined him and declared that our hero's life is in danger. After two days he had a heart attack. It was his last hours. Doctors asked his friends to stay next to him. Karam knew that he was going to die, but what hurt him the most was that he was going to die away from his homeland. He thought of his funeral, thus he revealed to his confessor, the Father Karoubim, that he wants a decent funeral and burial. He gave him an amount of money for this purpose, he gave as well the Baroness Vetry another amount in order to buy candles and flowers and put them on his coffin and tomb.

On the morning of the 7 April 1889, Karam died near Naples, aged 65. His last words were "God ... Lebanon". The Italian hosts place a placard on his grave that reads: "this is the resting place of the Youssef Boutros Karam, the Lebanese Prince". Even though, he was never officially a prince, this title was bestowed upon him affectionately due to his stature, behavior, and moral values. The news of his death overwhelmed Lebanon in general and Zgharta and the north in particular with grief.

On 14 September 1889, his body was brought back to his homeland, the land of his youth, resistance, victories and pride. He was finally in Ehden where thousands gathered to honour the hero of Lebanon. His body was later placed in a specially built coffin with a glass top inside Saint Georges Cathedral. Hundreds of thousands of Lebanese have since visited Karam's resting place. In addition to paying their respect, they pay homage to the spirit of Youssef Bey Karam who sacrificed himself ‘so that Lebanon shall live’.

== Battles ==
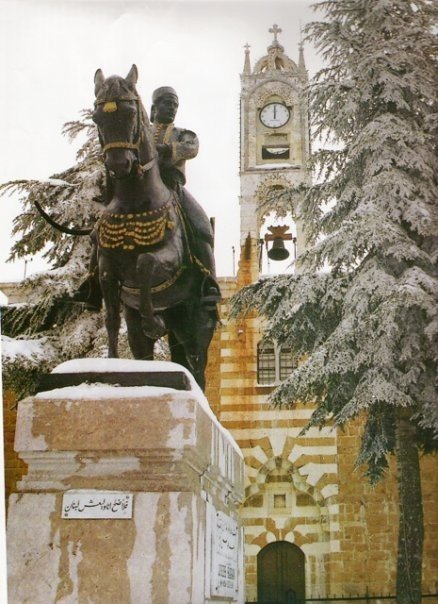
Youssef Bey Karam Statue at Saint George Church

In the following battles, Youssef fought against the Ottomans:

- Maameltein and Aafas - Sunday 6 January 1866 (Lebanese Victory)
- Great Battle of Bnachii - Sunday 28 January 1866 (Lebanese Victory)
- Sebhel - Thursday 1 March 1866 (Victory)
- Ehmej and Anaya - Wednesday 14 March 1866 (Lebanese Victory)
- Wadi En Nousour - Thursday 22 March 1866 (Lebanese Victory)
- Aitou and Kfarfou - Friday 15 June 1866 (Lebanese Victory)
- Hadath - Wednesday 4 July 1866 (Lebanese Victory)
- Ayn El Jawz and Bchenata - Saturday 7 July 1866 (Lebanese Victory)
- Ayn Karna and Wadi Miziara - Monday 20 August 1866 (Lebanese Victory)
- Ehden - Saturday 15 December 1866 (Lebanese Victory)
- Ejbeh and Aarjes - Thursday 10 January 1867 (Lebanese Victory)
- Wadi El Salib - Thursday 17 January 1867 (Lebanese Victory)

He ended up winning every single battle against the Ottomans

=== Youssef Bey Karam and the Revolt of 1866: Alliance with Emir Salman al-Harfush ===
In the turbulent decade of the 1860s, northern Lebanon became a stage for insurrection against Ottoman authority. Among the figures who emerged during this period was Emir Salman al-Harfush of Baalbek, heir to a once-powerful Shiʿi dynasty whose hereditary domains had been dismantled by the Ottoman administration. Though stripped of his fief and declared an outlaw, Salman continued to wield both military and symbolic authority, attracting attention not only from local powers but also from foreign observers.

His final campaign was waged in alliance with the Maronite notable Youssef Bey Karam, the foremost leader of armed resistance to Ottoman centralization. Once a political mediator who had even sought amnesty for the Harfush family from Fuad Pasha, Karam now relied heavily on Salman as a battlefield ally. Together they launched a series of daring operations across northern Mount Lebanon.

In February 1866, the two men mounted a coordinated assault on Ghāzir, advancing simultaneously from the sea and the mountains. The town was spared only through the timely intervention of imperial detachments dispatched for its defense. They also struck at Ottoman encampments in the Zāwiya district, a bold move that underscored their intention to challenge imperial forces directly.

Contemporary French reports confirm Salman al-Harfush’s pivotal role. A dispatch by the officer Al Thabe, submitted to the Ministry of War on 5 February 1866, described him as “the lord of Baalbek, from whom the Turks had seized his district several years ago, and upon whose head they had set a price.” The same report recounts how Salman and Karam, leading their men, attempted to seize Zgharta, where French observers themselves were stationed.

A subsequent communication from the French Consul General in Beirut to the Foreign Ministry on 18 March 1866 stressed the political consequences of his reappearance: “The presence of Prince al-Harfush in the mountains of al-Kūrah is likely to delay the results we are striving for—namely, the submission of the misguided mountaineers without driving them to extremism or armed resistance.”.

Historians have since noted that Salman’s contribution was decisive. As Nasib Naccache observed, “Had Youssef Karam not been bolstered by Salman al-Harfush, he would not have entertained even the slightest thought of resistance.”. This assessment highlights the cross-sectarian dimension of the 1866 revolt: a Maronite leader and a Shiʿi prince, each dispossessed by Ottoman reforms, found common cause in armed defiance.

Thus, the brief but consequential alliance of Emir Salman al-Harfush and Youssef Bey Karam illustrates both the fragility of Ottoman authority in Mount Lebanon and the enduring capacity of local elites to forge resistance across communal boundaries when political necessity demanded it.

== Beliefs ==
Many of his beliefs were extracted from among other sources:

- An open letter in which Karam calls for the establishment of a 'League of Nations' or 'Human Rights Association' as he called it. Karam explained that this would be an International Organisation, which would work for world peace and guarantee the rights of small nations.
- A letter to Amir Abdul Kader Al Jazaa'iri encouraging him to liberate all Arabs from the Ottoman Empire and then establishing a form of 'Arab League', where each member State would retain sovereignty and independence.

== Body ==
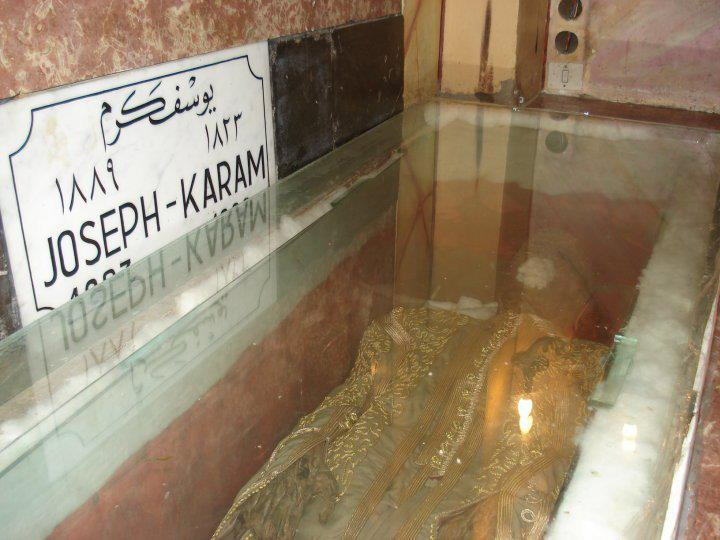
Youssef Bey Karam Body inside St Georges Church - Ehden before restoration

In the beginning of May 1889, all the Bey of Karam family sent a delegation to Italy in order to return their dean's body to Lebanon. After severe negotiations, in which the French ambassador in Constantinople interfered, the delegation was able to have a permit from the Sublime Porte to return Karam's body to Lebanon.

The coffin was removed from the grave and it was in a good condition. When the coffin was opened, Karam's body appeared in a very good condition as well. His face was intact; his clothes, ornamented with gold, were not damaged or impaired in any way. His corpse was not mummified, because when his nephews learned about his death, they sent a telegraph with an amount of money to Shedid Bey Hobeish, the Turkish consul in Naples, asking him to take care of mummifying their uncle's body. Many weeks passed between the death and the mummification negotiations. Therefore, Shedid Pasha replied in a telegraph saying that the doctors examined the body and decided that the mummification is absolutely impossible.

In 2012, after 123 years since the death of Youssef Bey Karam, the body has suffered some slight decay because of humidity inside the coffin. Accordingly, Youssef Bey Karam Foundation called the Medical Italian Delegation, which has examined the body in 2002 after an individual initiative taken by M. Naji Kallasy and Sayed Farchakh.

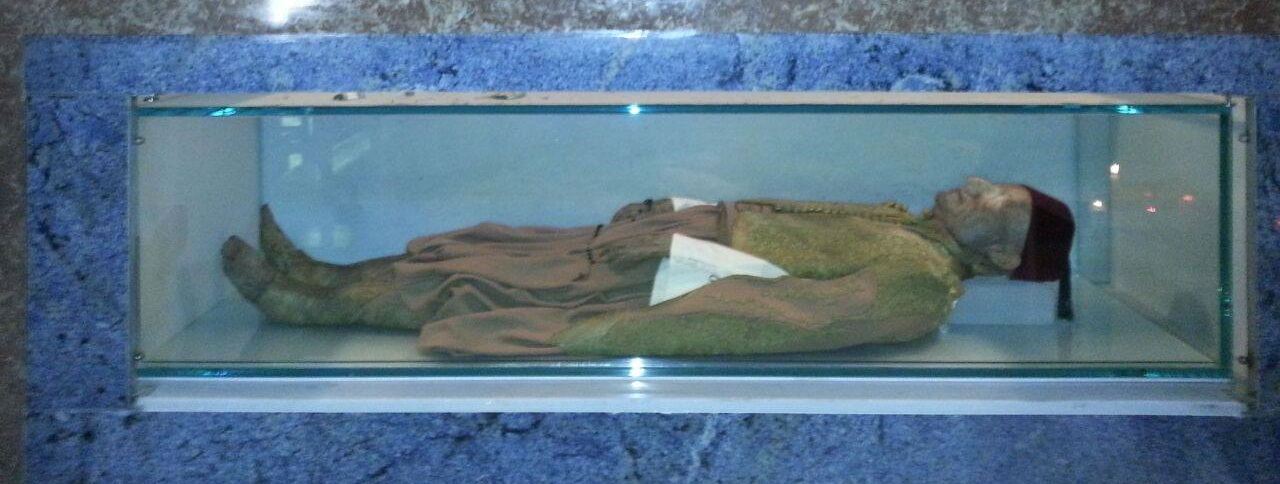
Youssef Bey Karam Body after restoration

The Italian Delegation proposed a project for the body's restoration. The foundation along with Ehden-Zgharta Parish agreed that the Parish will take charge of supervising and implementing the plan of the body's restoration. Not to mention that coordinating with the foundation is necessary with every step the Parish is going to take.

The Zghartawi emigrant M. Edmond Abshi presented a donation of 200 thousand euros for the complete restoration of the body.

The restoration workshop began in March 2013 and ended in June 2013.

The body was returned to Saint George Cathedral in Ehden inside a new - air and water isolator - vitreous coffin, allowing everyone to see it.

== Legacy ==
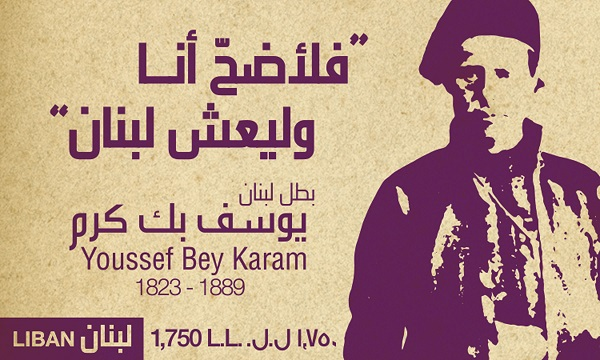
Youssef Bey Karam Stamp

On 11 September 1932, a bronze statue of Karam was erected in his memory outside the Cathedral of Saint Georges, Ehden. This statue was made by his namesake Youssef Howayek.

In 2008, Rita Karam, daughter of minister and MP Salim Bey Karam founded the Youssef Bey Karam Foundation.

In November 2014, The Ministry of Communication in conjunction with Liban Post has finally issued formal stamps in recognition of the Hero of Lebanon Youssef Bey Karam. Sami Saab designed the stamp in coordination with the Youssef Bey Karam Foundation.

In 2017, a wax figure of Youssef Bey Karam has been installed in the Marie Baz wax museum in Deir al-Qamar.

== Archive Collection and Partnership with USEK ==
On 3 June 2013, Youssef Bey Karam Foundation signed a cooperation agreement with University of Saint Esprit – Kaslik about collecting and conserving the Archive of Youssef Bey Karam. According to the agreement, the Phoenix Center for Lebanese Studies coordinates with the Youssef Bey Karam Foundation for archive management and documents archiving and also prepares media campaign to announce the archive.

Preceded by Sheikh Boutros Karam	Governor of Ehden; 1846-1861	Succeeded by Mikhael Bey Karam

Preceded by Prince Bashir Ahmad	Christian Kaymakam; 17 November 1860-9 June 1861	Succeeded by
