= Miziara =

Town in Zgharta District, Lebanon

Miziara مزيارة
- Town
- Location within Lebanon
- Coordinates: 34°19′58″N 35°55′49″E
- Country: Lebanon
- Governorate: North Governorate
- District: Zgharta District
- Elevation: 800 m (2,600 ft)
- Time zone: UTC+2 (EET)
  - Summer (DST): UTC+3 (EEST)
- Dialing code: +961

Miziara (known also as Meziara, Arabic: مزيارة) is a town located in the Zgharta District in the North Governorate of Lebanon. The village is home to Our Lady of Miziara, Mother of Mercies, St Elias Shrines, and Hotel Miziara, the village's first hotel.

The populated area called Miziara is formed of four villages: Miziara, Harf Miziara, Houmeis and Sakhra.

== Geography ==
Miziara: Miziara sits on a hilltop at 800 m above sea level, overlooking Morh Kfarsghab, Jdeideh, Zgharta, Tripoli, and the Mediterranean Sea. The road that leads to it goes through Zgharta, Kfarhata, Iaal, and then to Miziara. The town's water source is in Ain El Moutran, coming through Bhairet Toula, a nearby village.

Harf Miziara and Houmeis: The road that leads to these two villages goes through Miziara.

Sakhra: Administratively, this village does not exist. The inhabitants are from Miziara, and the road that leads to it goes through Zgharta – Kfarhata – El Khaldiyeh - Sakhra. It rises 300 meters above sea level. The distance from Zgharta is 5 kilometers. Its patron Saint is Saint Maroun, whose feast is on February 9. The water source is Ain Al Jadideh (the New Spring).

== Population ==
For Miziara, the population is around 4,250. Including the inhabitants of Harf Miziara and Houmeis, the population becomes nearly 6,000.

The number of households is 567 in Miziara, 151 in Harf Miziara, 51 in Sakhra and 56 in Houmeis.

== Etymology and name ==
- miziara could be a contracted form of two Arabic words Min - Ziara which could mean from the visit. According to some authors, ziara could be coming from Aramaic from the root zwr, meaning struggle, battle or fight. mi could be a contaminated form of beth (house). In this case, the meaning of 'Miziara' could be the house of battle.
- harf in Arabic means literally border or limit. In Aramaic, it means the pine forest which is plausible as this area is known for its pine trees.
- houmeis means in the local Arabic dialect the sun-dried tobacco leaves. It could be an appropriate meaning as this village used to be known for its excellent tobacco production.
- sakhra comes from Arabic and means rock. The terrain of the village is especially rocky.

== History ==
This article is based on an article of Al Bashir newspaper on Miziara.

Miziara was not inhabited before the late 17th century. Before it was established the area was a dense forest, containing wild boars. Part of the land where the today Miziara is located was part of the baklik of the Shia Sheikhs Hamadeh, the rulers of Jebbet Bsharri from 1654 till 1761.

=== 18th and 19th centuries ===
At the end of the 16th century, and the beginning of the 17th century, the southern Mount Lebanon under the stable rule of the Emir Fakhreddine (1678–1735) attracted many families who were encouraged by the Emir to build their home there. An important migration took place from Jebbet Bsharri to the south but also to Aleppo, Syria.

After the fall of the Emir Fakhreddine in 1632, living conditions worsened in the southern Mount Lebanon and there was a reverse migration to North Lebanon. This migration from the Metn and Kesrwan accelerated particularly after the Sheikhs Hamadeh, rulers of Jebbet Bsharri started stabilising their rule around 1680. It is in this context that Naamtallah Néhmé, the ancestor of all the Meziarian families, arrived in North Lebanon, like many others.

When Naamtallah Néhmé left Bikfaya, Metn, to North Lebanon, he first settled in Arbet Kozhaya. He brought up and raised his family there.

Later on, the family moved to Sereel and then to Ejbeh, where they did not stay for long, moving to a small farm beside Sebhel. Rishtaamout was the name of the farm. in Syriac, Rishtaamout means the summit of taste or of pleasure as the farm had a reputation as producing tasty fruits.

There Naamtallah's children founded four families:

- Younis: the origin of the Younis and Béchara families.
- Abdallah: the origin of the Wehbeh, Fadi, Tannous and Sleiman families.
- Youssef: the origin of the Khoury, Raad and Abi Rashed families.
- Abdel Ahad: the origin of the family Abdel Ahad which is also known as the Chidiac family.

The Historian Boutros Béchara Karam wrote in his book The Coral Chain in the history of North Lebanon that the family of Naamtallah Néhmé stayed in Rishtaamout for about seventy years. The family did not grow or branch out. Spending winters, springs and autumns in the farm. But summers were spent in Ejbeh, where they bought a hill and built a church on it, which is still known as Saint George Mountain.

Naamtallah Néhmé family requested from the rulers of Jebbet Bsharri, the Shiite Hamadeh, the permission to live in Houmeis, a ruined village and its nearby forest which is now known as Miziara. Their request was granted.

Younis and his family moved to Houmeis. The other three brothers Youssef, Abdallah and Abdel Ahad settled in the forest with their families, as its location and atmosphere gave them great pleasure. So Youssef, son of Naamtallah Néhmé, became the founder of Miziara as was recorded by the Historians.

In 1761, a conflict opposed the people of Jebbet Bsharri to the Sheikhs Hamadeh. In this conflict, Miziara will lose two of its sons, Dawud son of Abou Mansour and his cousin Issa during the campaign of 1763.

After Prince Youssef Al Shihabi, then ruler of the Byblos region, took over the rule of Jebbet Bsharri, a land survey was made in 1766. Prince Youssef gave the Sheikhs Karam from Ehden and the Sheikhs Issa El Khoury from Bsharri the collection of taxes of Miziara and its vicinity. Prince Youssef Al Shihabi ruled afterwards Lebanon from 1770 to 1789.

In 1849, there were 250 male adults in Miziara and 163 in Houmeis. The number of households was 51 in Miziara and 35 in Houmeis. Around 1850 - 1851, we know that Father Maroun Saliba from Miziara was the administrative tax collector. It is said that this family came at the end of the 18th century to the region from Bteghrine, Metn. Today, this family lives in Sakhra.

As we are informed by Historians and by the local memory, that Youssef, son of Naamtallah Néhmé, bore children, Youssef was the eldest son, he became a priest known as Father Elias, who also bore a son, Youssef Elias Khoury.

Youssef Elias Khoury was the beginning, as the old people of Miziara used to say. He bore seven boys and five girls. Hanna, the eldest son, was known as Hanna Youssef. There was a famous saying in Miziara: Just like the children of Hanna's mother, meaning unity of the family. At that time, all the Meziarians, except for Yousef Elias, were sharecroppers with the Sheikhs Karam and Issa El Khoury. Every year the partners had to send to the Sheikhs twenty kilograms of silk from the seasonal production in Miziara, 125 kilograms of tobacco and also products like grains and grapes. This is written in the Encyclopedia of Lebanese capitals and villages, know Lebanon by Afif Boutros Merhej.

=== 20th century ===
In the beginning of the 20th century, the difficult conditions of sharecroppers made Yousef Elias Khoury instigate the people to revolt. The disagreement started between the Meziarians and the Sheiks of Issa El Khoury. A court case was filed but the judgment was in favor of the Sheiks. This was written in El Bachir newspaper on the first of July 1913.

The families objected to the judgment supported by Fr. Youssef Younis (the grandfather of the Meziarian writer and poet Youssef Younis known as Younis Al Ibn). It was the first responsibility that Father Youssef Younis carried on his shoulders, the freedom of Meziara. He used to wear an old shoe, light his cigarette and walk on foot to Batroun, the administrative center of the Bsharri region during the Mutassarrifiat Regime (1862–1918). After that, he went to Syria, met the ruler and told him the whole story. He got what he requested. All the land was registered in the name of the sharecroppers, the new farm owners. (From Yousef Younis book, His Life & Traces to Mikhail Massoud.)

The farmers could not pay their taxes in exchange for ownership of the land. But the Sheikhs paid their taxes and registered the land in the owners' names. And the Sheikhs were satisfied with a legal deed signed from the new owners.

But a major transformation has been happening since the end of the 19th century. In fact, at that time, the Meziarians started to emigrate to Brazil. Seventy people traveled in an effort to pay for the legal deeds, which they signed.

Yousef Elias Khoury, Hanna's father, stayed in Miziara with his sons, occupied with the management of his money and estates. He took loans from the wealthy Tripolitans, to loan the Aghas of Danniyeh. Then came a time when the Aghas were unable to pay their debts in cash, so they paid it with land and estates. It is at the origin of the Bchenneta plantation. Assad Beik Karam, from Ehden, bought it. The Meziarians bought it from him, to use as a summer residence.

Yousef Elias Khoury ordered every inhabitant of Miziara to fill a bag of acorns from the Oak trees of Bchenneta and plant it around Miziara. He specified every Sunday of every season, the feast of planting acorns around Miziara.

Miziara features qusur, Arabic for 'palaces,' which were constructed using wealth brought from emigrants in Africa.

== Our Lady of Miziara ==
Our Lady of Miziara, Mother of Mercies, is a Marian shrine which consists of a statue of the Virgin Mary that stands at the entrance of the village. Marcel Chaghoury, a native of Miziara, built the shrine in 1979. It was consecrated by Bishop Antoine Jbeir on September 6, 1992. The entrance to the shrine is guarded by two angels carved from limestone. The shrine also includes sculptural representation of Christ's Baptism, Wedding at Cana, and the Last Supper.

== Agriculture ==
The Agricultural of Miziara is based on: Apples, Pears, Grapes and assorted grains for the people's use. The most important river is El-Aam river.
