= Saint Moura =

Christian martyr

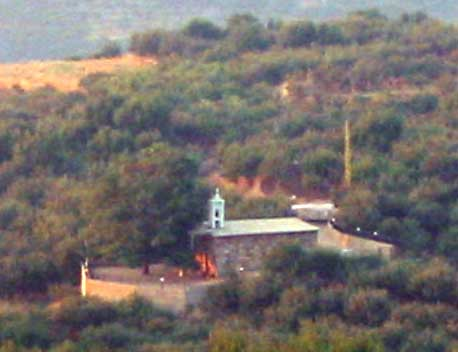
- Saint Moura Church, Kfarsghab, Lebanon

Mart Moura
- Born: 3rd Century; Upper Egypt
- Died: 283; Ansena, Egypt
- Venerated in: Eastern Orthodox Church Oriental Orthodox Churches; Catholic Churches
- Major shrine: Different places in Lebanon
- Feast: May 3, September 25 (Catholic Churches and Eastern Orthodox Church); 5 Hathor and 8 Pashons (Coptic churches)
- Attributes: Martyr

Saint Moura, also known as Mart Moura, is a Christian martyr of the third century and is honored in Egypt and the Middle East. Her feast is celebrated on 3 May and on 25 September, 5 Hathor and 8 Pashons in the Coptic church. Several churches are dedicated to her, especially in northern Lebanon, as well as a monastery in Ehden.

== Life ==
Father Youakim Moubarac presents the life of Mart Moura as follows:

Moura is a Christian from Upper Egypt married to a deacon called Timothy. When Diocletianus came to power and wanted to erase any trace of Christianity, the governor Urban invited Timothy and his wife to embrace paganism. They refused with courage, were crucified and died from slow death around 283. It is also supposed that this martyrdom took place under Decius. The Maronite calendar of saints mentions her feast day on the dates of October 10th and September 25th. It is also mentioned on the 3rd and the 7th of May. The Bollandists kept the date of May 3rd (WHIZZ, II, 381; cf. KUE, I, 151)...

The martyrdom of Timothy and Moura took place in Ansena, a city of Upper Egypt known as Antinoöpolis in the Roman Thebaid.

If the martyrdom of Saint Moura took place under Decius, then it should have been prior to June 251, the date of the death of this emperor.

If the martyrdom's presumed date of 283 AD is correct, it should then have taken place under the reign of Carus or his sons Carinus and Numerian.

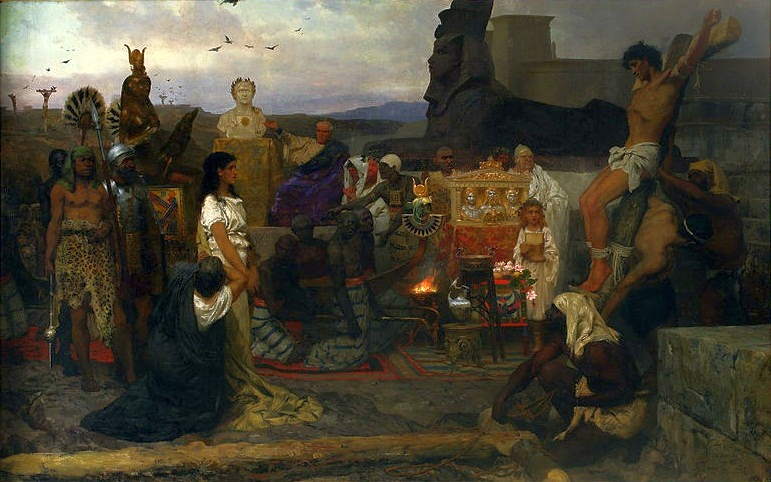
Martyrdom of Saint Timothy and Moura.

== Places of worship ==
Several churches are dedicated to Mart Moura among the Maronites of northern Lebanon, in Mayfouq, Kfarsghab, Karm el Mohr, Kobayat, Rachiine, Miziara Bnachii and Bekarzala. There is also a sanctuary in Kahf Al Malloul. Mart Moura is the patron saint of Bekarzala Akkar, where a painting of the saint is inside the village church that was created in 2007 by Nabil Antoine Chahine, an academic and film director who reside in Melbourne, Australia.

The church of Kfarsghab hosted a Maronite Synod in 1598.

The church of Bnachii is the object of an important devotion in the Zgharta District.

There is also a monastery dedicated to Saint Moura in Ehden. It is in this monastery that the Lebanese Maronite Order was founded in 1694 by three Maronite young men from Aleppo, Syria under the patronage of Patriarch Estephane El Douaihy (1670–1704).

== See also ==
- Decian persecution
