= Mazraat En Nahr =

Village in Zgharta District, Lebanon

Mazraat En Nahr مزرعة النهر
- Village
- Location within Lebanon
- Coordinates: 34.284°N 35.9186°E
- Country: Lebanon
- Governorate: North Governorate
- District: Zgharta District

Population (2010)
  - Total: 378
- Time zone: UTC+2 (EET)
  - Summer (DST): UTC+3 (EEST)
- Postal code: 33227
- Dialing code: +961
- Website: http://mazraatennahr.weebly.com/
- Family Names: Khalil; Bakhos; Bakous; Bitar; Dib; Ghaleb; Hawwa; Massaad; Michael; Mouawad; Moujalli; Nasr; Nassif; Rawadi; Saba; Semaan; Sleiman; Yaacoub; Yaghi; Younan; Zougbi

Mazraat En Nahr (Arabic: مزرعة النهر), also spelled Mazret Al Nahr, Mazraat El Nahr or Mazraat Al Nahr, is a village located on the border line of the Zgharta District and the Bsharri District in the North Governorate of Lebanon. Situated in the Valley of Qadisha, between the villages of Tourza and Sereel, Mazraat En Nahr is considered a holy and spiritual place in Eastern Christianity.

== Etymology/Demographics ==
Mazraat Al Nahr is a Lebanese word meaning “Farm/planting by the river.” The name derives from the agricultural production of potatoes, onions, fruits, and vegetables all by the side rivers of El Karya and El Ghar Spring. The population of Mazraat En Nahr is approximately 378 people, but no official census has been conducted lately. Historically, the inhabitants of Mazraat En Nahr were a mixture of many peoples. The majority were Cannanites, Phoenicians, and Aramiin, who later became known as the Syriac.

Lebanese diaspora from Mazraat En Nahr number approximately 20,000 worldwide, residing primarily in Australia, the United States and Canada.

=== Religion ===
The population of the region consists of a Maronite Christian majority.

=== Agriculture ===
The village's main agriculture consists mainly of farming potatoes, onions, fruits and vegetables. The village water is supplied from the El Karya and El Ghar springs.

== Location/Tourism ==
The village of Mazraat En Nahr is at an altitude of 567 meters above mean sea level, and 98km from Beirut, 24km from Tripoli, and 19km from Zgharta. The annual celebration, The Feast of Mar Youssef (Saint Joseph), takes place on the 19th of March.

Local routes to the village: Tripoli - Zgharta - Kfar Hata - Aarjis - Kfar Fou - Karm Seddeh - Sereel - Mazraat En Nahr.

Alternative: Ehden - Sereel - Mazraat En Nahr.

=== Lodging ===
Saqiyat al `Abd - 2 km or 2 miles
Saqiet el Abd - 2 km or 2 miles
Mgharet Abou Aali - 4 km or 3 miles
Magharat Abu `Ali - 4 km or 3 miles
Dahr Abou Taiya - 6 km or 4 miles
Dahr Abu Tayyah - 6 km or 4 miles
Ed Doueir - 6 km or 4 miles
Saqiet el Aakre - 2 km or 1 miles
Saqiyat al `Akirah - 2 km or 1 miles
Harf el Aalem - 5 km or 3 miles
Harf al `Alam - 5 km or 3 miles
Al `Aqabah - 2 km or 2 miles
El Aaqabe - 2 km or 2 miles
Qada' `Alayh - 3 km or 2 miles
Al Baruk - 6 km or 4 miles
