= Bhairet Toula =

Village in Zgharta District, Lebanon

Bhairet Toula بحيرة تولا
- Village
- Location within Lebanon
- Coordinates: 34°19′23″N 35°58′15″E
- Country: Lebanon
- Governorate: North Governorate
- District: Zgharta District
- Elevation: 984 m (3,228 ft)
- Time zone: UTC+2 (EET)
  - Summer (DST): UTC+3 (EEST)
- Dialing code: +961

Bhairet Toula (known also as Buhayrat Toula or Bouhairat Toula, Al Bouhairi, Levantine Arabic: بحيرة تولا, romanized: Bḥayret Tūlā) is a village located in the Zgharta District in the North Governorate of Lebanon. It is situated to the North of Toula.

Originally a part of Toula, this village is known for its water and agriculture (Apples, Pears, Grape, Peaches, and Cherries). 90% of its population migrate during the winter months to coastal cities like Zgharta, Mejdlaya, Tripoli, Chekka, Batroun, Byblos, Jounieh and Beirut. Al Bouhairi has 10 families, permanently settled in the village and more than 100 residences, most of those being used mainly during summertime. Home to many "Barakats". Also, large numbers of its citizens migrated since the end of the 19th century to Australia, Venezuela, United States, England, France, different African countries.

The church of Al Bouhairi is dedicated to Saint Maron (in Arabic Mar Maroun). Its feast day is celebrated on July 28 (Monks of Saint Maron, Rouhban Mar Maroun feast). Al Bouhairi has two community centers, The Sacred Heart of Jesus Association and Club Al Bouhairy, active only during summer.
