= Mazraat Hraikis =

Village in Zgharta District, in the North Governorate of Lebanon

Coordinates: 34.4544°N 35.9282°E

Mazraat Hrayqess (Arabic: مزرعة حريقص, romanized: Mazraʿat Ḥrayqeṣṣ) is a village in Zgharta District, in the North Governorate of Lebanon.

Hrayqess is located within the district of Zgharta, situated close to the border of the Minieh-Danniyeh district, also bordered by the villages of Bousit, Burj al-Yahudiyeh, and Miniyeh.

Hrayqess is situated on the mountainside of Jabal Terbol, facing the Mediterranean Sea. Elevated 681 meters above sea level, Hrayqess offers panoramic views of the Mediterranean Sea and the Lebanese landscape.

The inhabitants of Hrayqess are predominantly Christian, adhering to the Maronite church, while a smaller amount of Muslims are present.

The predominant family present within Hrayqess is the Al Tars family, which belongs to the Maronites. The Al Tars family is the largest and most established family in Hrayqess, forming a significant majority.

On the other hand, the Deeb family, which belongs to the Sunnis, is also present within the village, but are much smaller in population, forming a minority.

A small church was built in the centre of Hrayqess in the late 19th century (1880, 1890s) to venerate the virgin Mary. This church was consecrated by Bishop Anthony Peter Arida, (the Maronite Bishop of Tripoli during that time period and later the 73rd Maronite patriarch of Antioch), in the year of 1912.

Due to the large growth of population, there was a need for a larger church. In 1967 the construction started for the new Church, which was finished in 1984. This church was given the name of Our Lady of The Assumption, Hrayqess.
