= Raskifa =

Village in Zgharta District, Lebanon

Raskifa راسكيفا
- Village
- Location within Lebanon
- Coordinates: 34°18′38″N 35°52′01″E
- Country: Lebanon
- Governorate: North Governorate
- District: Zgharta District
- Elevation: 430 m (1,410 ft)
- Time zone: UTC+2 (EET)
  - Summer (DST): UTC+3 (EEST)
- Dialing code: +961

Raskifa (also Ras Kifa, R'asKifa, Arabic: راسكيفا, romanized: Rāskīfā) is a village located in the Zgharta District in the North Governorate of Lebanon. Its population is Maronite Catholic and Orthodox Christianity in Lebanon Greek Orthodox.

== Gallery ==
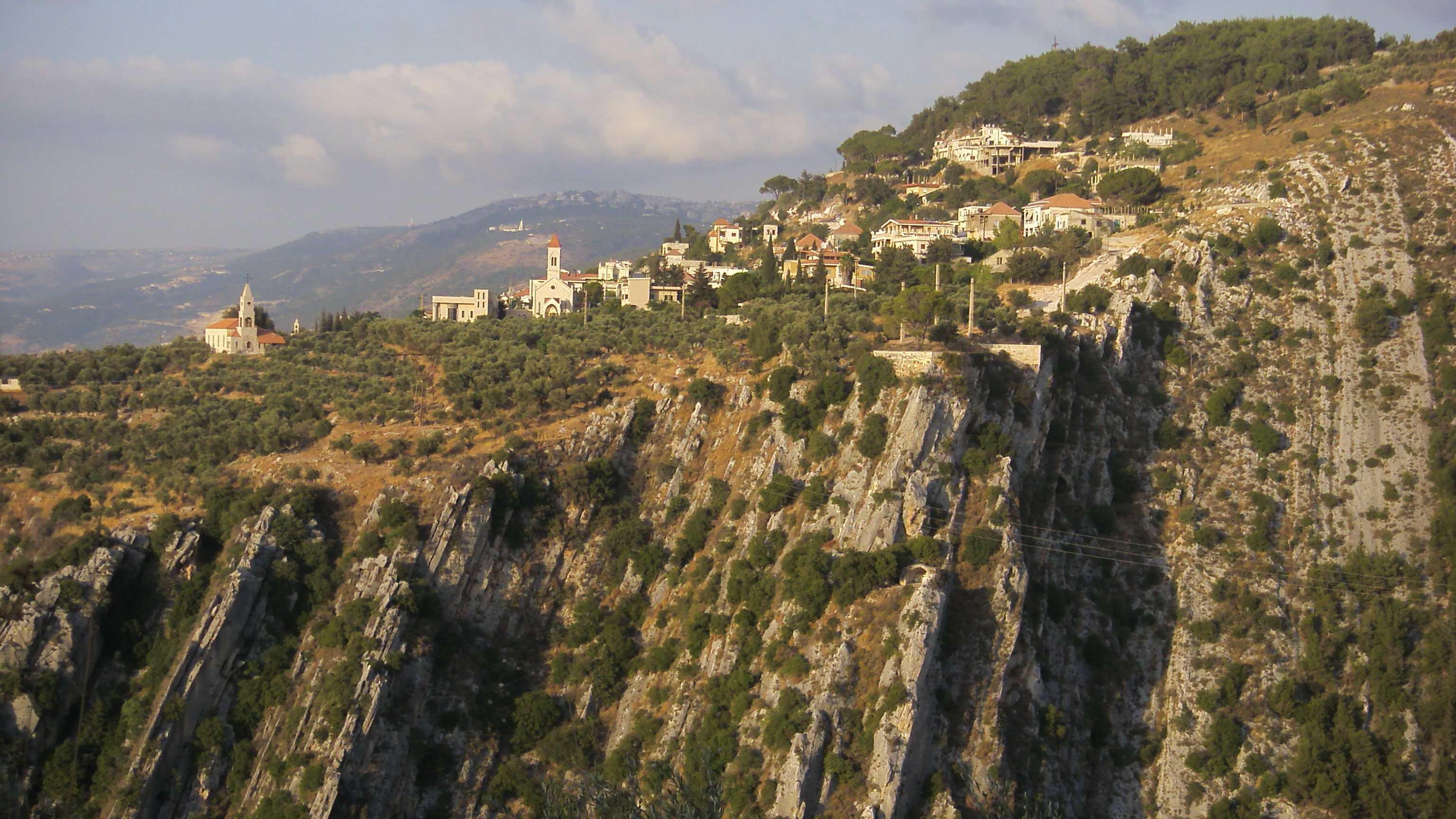
Raskifa is built on the rocks of the Kadisha Vallee

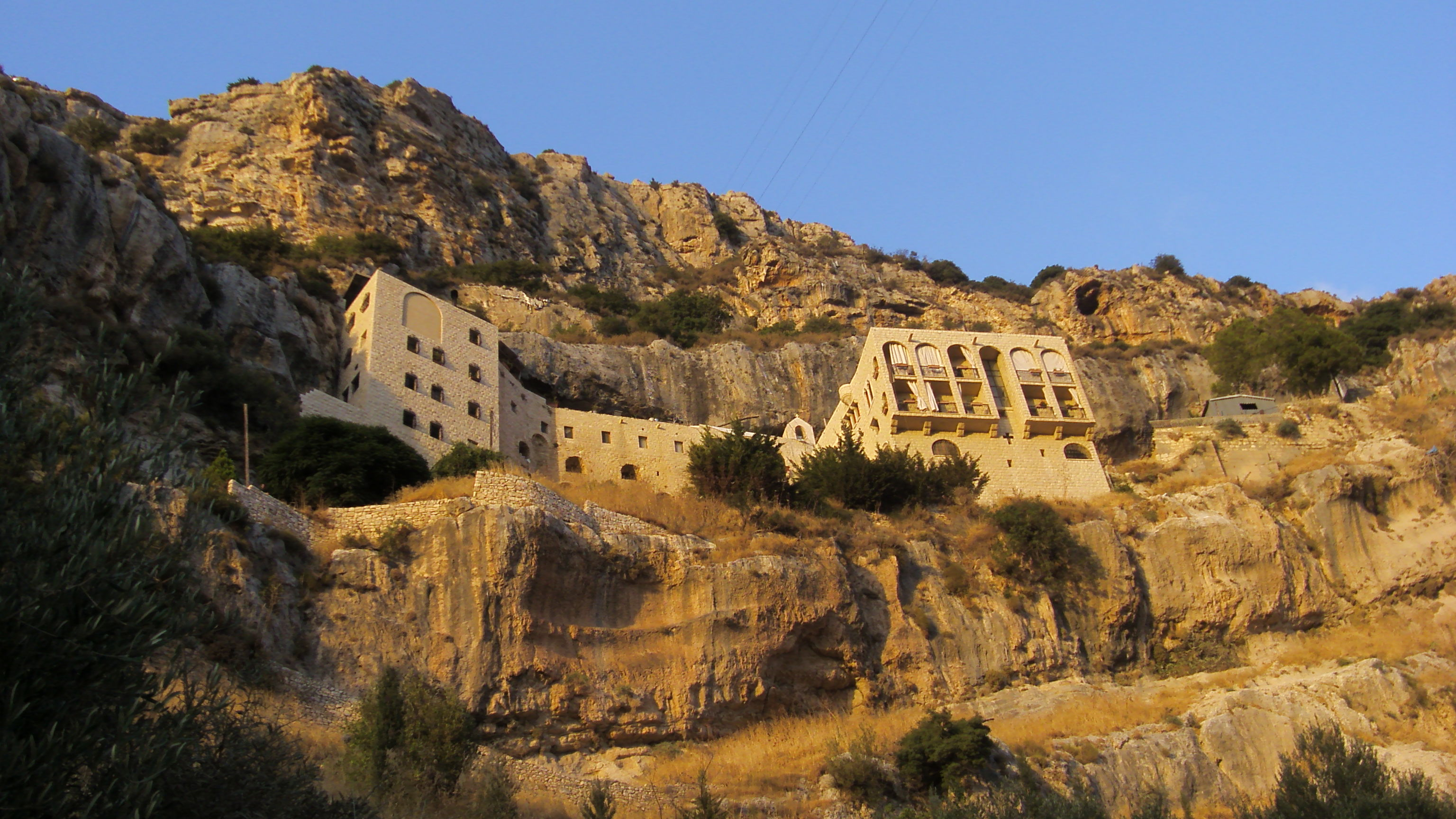
Greek orthodox monastery in Raskifa

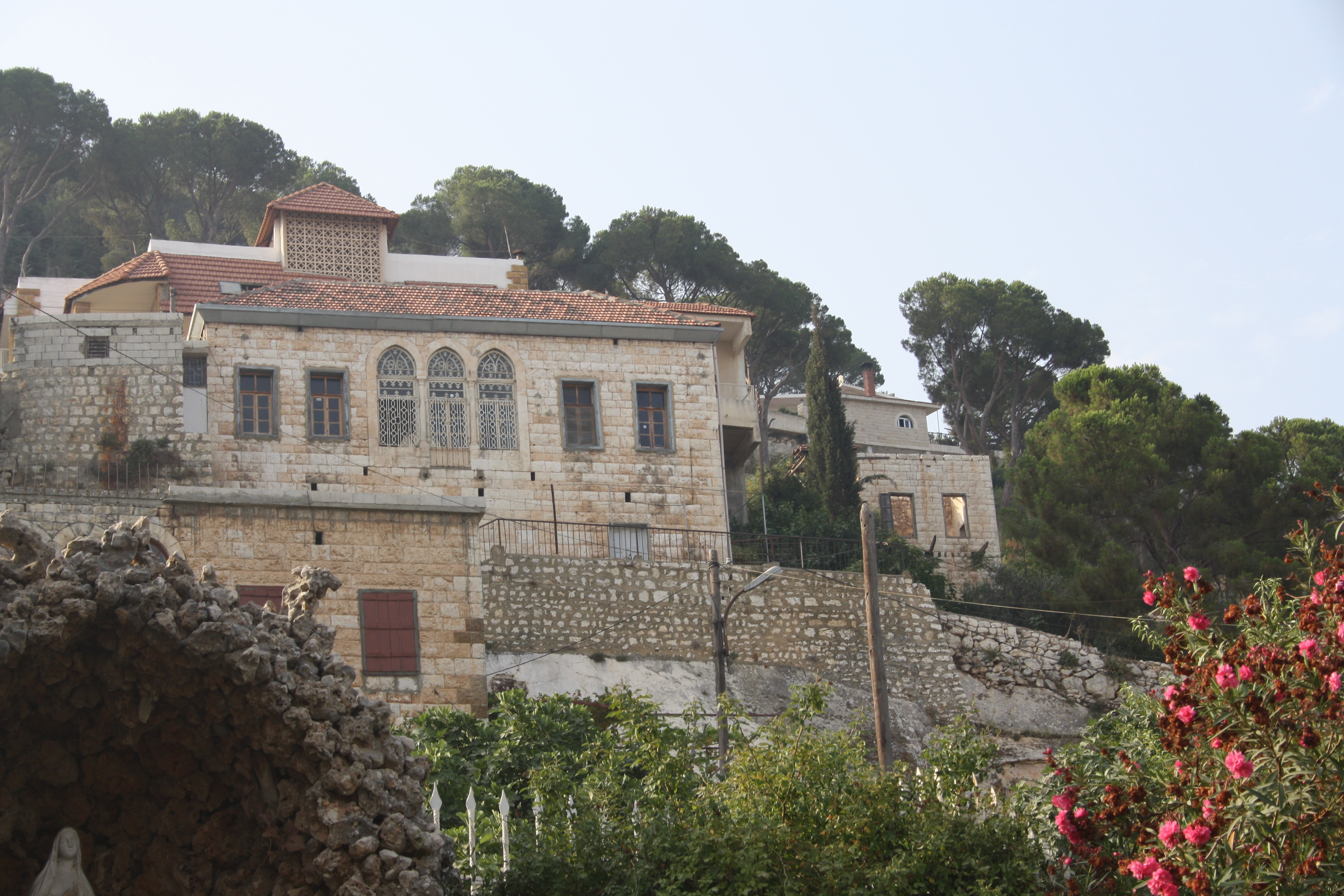
Traditional house in Raskifa
