= Kfarshakhna =

Village in Zgharta District, Lebanon

Kfarshakhna كفرشخنا
- Location in Lebanon
- Coordinates: 34°24′N 35°54′E
- Country: Lebanon
- Governorate: North Governorate
- District: Zgharta District

Area
  - Water: 0.77 sq mi (2 km^{2})
- Elevation: 720 ft (220 m)

Population
  - Total: 100
- Time zone: UTC+2 (EET)
  - Summer (DST): +3

Kfarshakhna, Kfrchakhna, Kfar Chakhna or Kafarchakhna (Arabic: كفرشخنا, romanized: Kfarshakhnā) is a small village in the region of North Lebanon, with an estimated population of not more than 100 people. In Syriac language, it means the silence and tranquility.

== Geography ==
Kfarshakhna is about 220 metres above sea level. It is 25 kilometres from the Mediterranean Sea, also 24 kilometres from the coastal city Tripoli, 80 kilometres from the capital of Lebanon, Beirut and 86 kilometres from the nearest Syrian city, Tartous. It is situated next to Abou Ali river, which separates El-Kora and Zghorta regions.

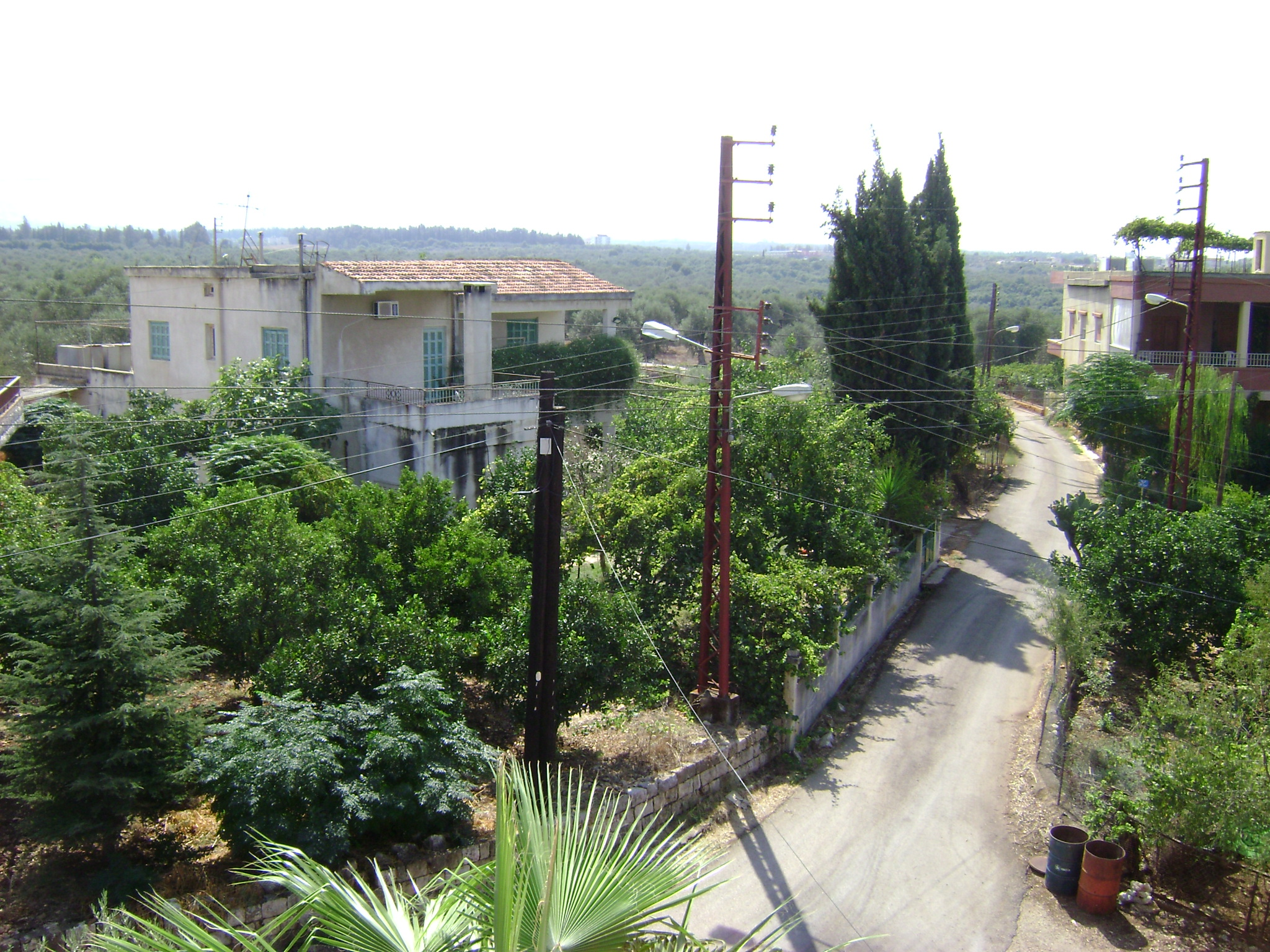
Village center

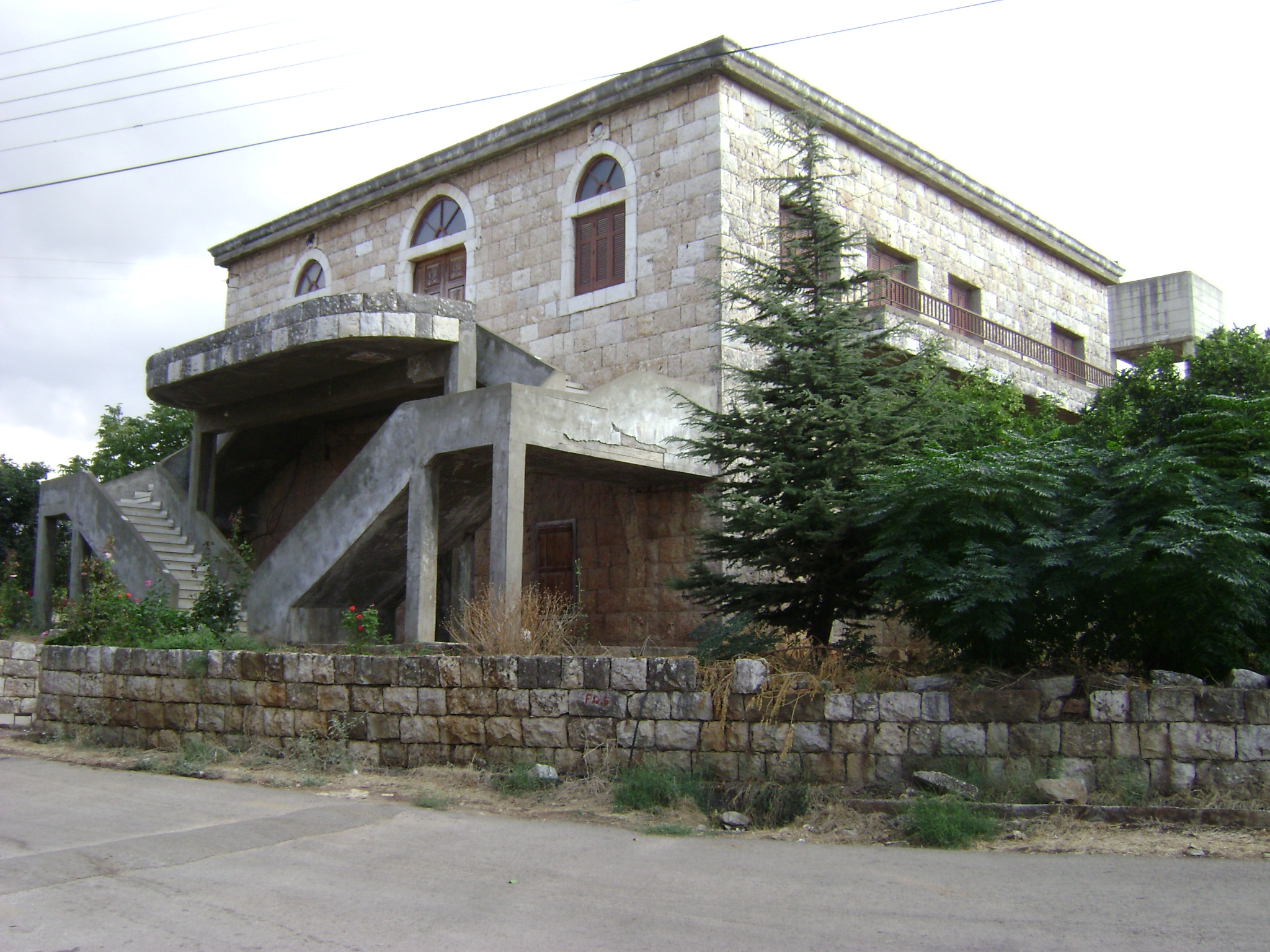
Old house

== Demographics ==
This village has about 20 houses. Most of the actual residents are old people. Most of the young people have deserted, looking for a better job conditions abroad.

Many young people have left the village in the beginning of the eighties to Saudi Arabia and Kuwait. The Gulf War forced the young emigrants to return. Some of them left for Canada. Michel Khoury a famous painter now living in Fredericton.

In 1555, Kfarchakhna counted 34 males, 51 males in 1849 and 100 males in 1906. There were 10 houses in Kfarshakhna in 1849 and 17 houses in 1932. In 1998 the official records counted 282 registered persons, half of them are emigrants. 91 of the registered persons are emigrants that went away and didn't report back, they represent one third of the persons on the official records.

== Agriculture ==
Olives are abundant. Grapes and bananas are also found.

The village holds one of Lebanese Agricultural Research Institute ( LARI 1 LARI2 ) stations. LARI is the only agricultural research institution in Lebanon, but it is not the only institution conducting agricultural research. LARI station was established at Kfarshkhana for soil, irrigation and farm machinery research.

Administratively, the principality (municipality) of the village is attached to the one of Kfarhaoura.

=== Climate ===
The weather is cold and humid in the winter and hot in the summer time.

The village has not enough water sources. Efforts of the local government to install a water station have failed due to dearth of financial resources. The area of the village depends solely on underground water reserves.

== Religion ==
There is just one church, St Georges [مار جرجس], where the people celebrate the Mass. Another old church is no longer used. It is situated next to the village and it's more than 400 years old. Currently, the village has two Priests, Father Georges [ جرجس], who has celebrated his centenary last year, and Father Youssef, who lives at present in Canada.

Another special landscape in the area of the village is a 100m deep hole with a diameter of 70m.

== Education ==
Almost of the students from the village study at "College de La Salle" French education system. As in all Lebanese college, Arabic, French and English are taught.
