= Miriata =

Sunni Muslim village in Zgharta District, Lebanon

Coordinates: 34.4182°N 35.9340°E

Miriata (Arabic: مرياطة, romanized: Miryāṭa) or Meryata is a Sunni Muslim village in Zgharta District, in the North Governorate of Lebanon.
