= Ardeh, Lebanon =

Village in North Governorate

Ardeh أرده
- Village
- Interactive map of Ardeh
- Location within Lebanon
- Coordinates: 34°24′47″N 35°54′43″E
- Country: Lebanon
- Governorate: North Governorate
- District: Zgharta District

Area
  - Total: 5.76 km^{2} (2.22 sq mi)
- Elevation: 160 m (520 ft)

Population
  - Total: 4,554
  - Density: 791/km^{2} (2,050/sq mi)
- Time zone: UTC+2 (EET)
  - Summer (DST): UTC+3 (EEST)
- Dialing code: +961

Ardeh (Levantine Arabic: أرده, romanized: ʾArdeh, also known in pre-Christian times as Ardata) is a village in Zgharta District, in the Northern Governorate of Lebanon. It is an ancient and historic town that was known during the 14th century B.C. as "Ardata".

The "Tallet" (hill) of Ardeh is an artificial one enfolding ruins of ancient edifices. During the 1970s the Lebanese Directorate of Archeology started archeological diggings in Ardeh and discovered important artifacts.

== Toponymy ==
The origin name Ardeh remains uncertain. The most common theory is that the name derivates from the Syriac word Ardata.

== Location ==
The village is 98 km from Beirut, 10 km from Tripoli and 4 km from Zgharta. Ardeh is situated 160 meters above sea level and covers an area of 5.76 km2.

== Population ==
In 1519 there were 38 adult males living in Ardeh (22 Christians and 16 Muslims) and in 1571 they increased to 62 adult males (44 Christians and 18 Muslims), in 1849 it counted 139 males living in 44 houses. During the early 20th century, Ardeh was inhabited by 150 Maronite males, 20 Orthodox males and 15 Muslim males. In the 1932 census, there were 147 houses in Ardeh.

Ardeh's official residents records counted 4554 and 5078 registered voters. Nearly one-third of the registered persons are now living abroad as emigrants. 160 of the registered are emigrants that had cut their relations with their motherland although their names are still in the records.

== Touristic sites ==
- The Tower of Saint George: The tower is 33 meters long and located on the Tallet. On the top of the tower sits a statue of Saint George, the intercessor of the Tallet. The statue was placed there by the Lebanese Army on 30 December 2015. The statue can be seen from sky at night (due to its unique lightning) and remains the only building with that perk.
- Waterland: Waterland is a summer resort and hotel. It has been found in 2010. This resort attracts many visitors from nearby villages.

== Nearby villages ==
Haref Ardeh is a small village that is a significant part of Ardeh community that shares some of the families with Ardeh. The number of registered in this community has increased significantly in the past 4 decades because many persons moved in from the District of Dannieh. In 1998 there were 1220 registered persons (963 registered in 1988), 30% of them are emigrants. Haref Ardeh is a small village that is enriched with lot of social activities that distinguishes it with all its surroundings and well known by its scouts organization and its music band as well as many other sports and religious organizations. Beit Awkar and Beit Obeid are two other small villages under the responsibility of the municipality of Ardeh. These villages consist mainly of one family each (like their names indicates).

== Agriculture ==
Olives, oranges, grapes, tobacco, fruits and vegetables are grown in the area.

== Water sources ==
- El Kadi spring
- Ain Ardeh

== Religious aspect ==
Ardeh is considered to have a very religious community, like every Lebanese countryside. This parish follows the western Christian calendar and it is under the sovereignty of the Maronite Archdiocese of Tripoli. Up until 2023, the head of the parish was the auxiliary bishop Monseigneur Boutrous Jabbour, who died in 2023. In his time, the church of Mary has been built and the church of Saint George has been refurbished. In 2018, Monseigneur Jabbour celebrated his 60th year as a priest, which he spent all of them in the parish of Ardeh.

Ardeh celebrates the following religious days:

- Saint Maroun on 9 February
- Easter Depends on the Western Christian Calendar
- Saint George, Mar jirjis on 23 April
- Saint Rita on 22 May
- Saint Charbel on every second Sunday of July
- Virgin Mary Festival on 15 August
- Saint Simon of the Stylite-Mar Semaan on 1 September
- Saints Sergius and Bacchus-Mar Sarkis and Bakhos on 7 October
- Christmas Day On 25 December
- Saint John on 27 December

== Useful information ==
=== Education ===
The school in Ardeh was present before World War I and teaching was done by the priests. Among them were Wakim Fadlallah, Youssef Chedid and Elias Awkar.

Nowadays, there are 2 schools in Ardeh, one is private and the other is public. The private school was founded in the 1930s by the Lazarists and in 1947, the school became sponsored by the Maronite Archdiocese and still is until this day. In 2006, the maronite school had 219 registered students. The public school was founded in the 1960 by the Lebanese government and it had 255 registered student in 2006.

=== Administration ===
The municipality of 15 members is shared with Harf Ardeh and two small communities Beit Awkar and Beit Obeid. The seats are distributed according to the number of listed voters: Ardeh 9 seats, Harf Ardeh 4 seats, Beit Awkar 1 seat, Beit Obeid 1 seat.

The current members of the board of municipality are:

- Habib Lattouf (President)
- Elie Hosny (Vice President)
- Raymond Marroun
- Ibrahim Jabbour
- Ghassan Haykal
- Sayed Moukhtafi
- Georgette Maatouk
- Sandra Fadlallah
- Bedouin Al Tawni
- Semaan Dib
- Bakhos Bou Francis
- Elie Mardini
- Francis Bou Francis
- Abdallah Obeid
- Elias Awkar
