= Karahbache =

Village in Zgharta District, Lebanon

Coordinates: 34.3936°N 35.8944°E

Karahbache, Korah Bach, Qarah Bach, (Arabic: قره باش, romanized: Qarah Bāsh) is a village in Zgharta District, in the North Governorate of Lebanon. The population is mainly Antiochian Orthodox Christian.

The name of the village is a composite of two Turkish words Karah (Black) Bache(Head). The small valley between Karahbache and Zgharta used to flood before it was cultivated and the residents of Asnoun would come and watch. One of those watching had a black servant. The servant built a shelter for his master from the rain, hence the name "Karahbache", or "Black Head". The master's family name was Joukhadar. It is said they were originally three brothers from Turkey who migrated to the Golan Heights and from there two of them went to northern Lebanon while one stayed in Syria. This is borne out by the fact that Joukhadars are still living in Syria and Lebanon. The name is spelled Joukhadar, Joukhdar or Joukhador, depending on how you pronounce it. One source claims it is also of Turkish origin with the word Dar meaning house and the word Joukh a type of cloth. 'House of cloth' could have meant they were tailors or members of the tailor's guild. Others say it is an abbreviation of the Armenian Joukhdarian which is plausible given that the Joukhdars are Eastern Orthodox Christians.

Many of the village's residents migrated to South America starting in the early twentieth century. After World War II, Australia was taking immigrants and members of the Saad family and later their cousins, the Nahlouses, Amyounis, and Ayoubs moved to Sydney, Australia, where many of them set up businesses and became prominent members of the local population.
