= Daraya, Zgharta =

Village in Zgharta District, Lebanon

Daraya داريا
- Village
- Location within Lebanon
- Coordinates: 34°19′44″N 35°52′07″E
- Country: Lebanon
- Governorate: North Governorate
- District: Zgharta District
- Elevation: 337 m (1,106 ft)
- Time zone: UTC+2 (EET)
  - Summer (DST): UTC+3 (EEST)
- Dialing code: +961

Daraya (also Darayya, Daraiya, Darayia, Arabic: داريا, romanized: Dārayyā) is a village located in the Zgharta District in the North Governorate of Lebanon. It is a Maronite Christian community. As of 2022, the town had 1,197 eligible voters.

There are 7 churches in Daraya. The main church is dedicated to Our Lady of Daraya on August 15 (in Arabic, Saidet daraya).

Main Families : Samrani, Alam, Gereige, Mannah, Saliba, Hedwan, Chalhoub, Hakim, Debbo, Semean

Large numbers of its citizens migrated since the end of the 19th century to Australia, Venezuela, United States, England, France, Canada and different countries.

Daraya is located approximately 10 kilometers in the northeast of Zgortha, 20 kilometers northwest of Tripoli the provincial (Mouhafaza) capital, and 120 kilometers of Beirut, the federal capital.

Daraya itself is a relatively well serviced village. Water supplies are available to all homes in the main village area. Electricity is provided to most households; however services are inconsistent as they are in most parts of Lebanon.

Within the village are a number of small family-owned supermarkets that provide everyday items such as groceries. Most other supplies must are available in Zgharta, which lies approximately 10 minutes from the village by road.

Agriculture is the main activity of the town with an important olive oil production in the coastal areas.
