= Hilan =

Village in Zgharta District, Lebanon

Coordinates: 34.4292°N 35.9608°E

Hilan (Arabic: حيلان, romanized: Ḥīlān) is a village in Zgharta District, in the North Governorate of Lebanon. It is inhabited by Sunni Muslims.

It rests at an altitude of 300 meters above the sea level and stretches across 492 hectares. It is 100 kilometers from Beirut and seven kilometers from Zgharta. It may be reached through Tripoli to Erdeh and from there to Meryata, Ashash and finally to Hilan.
