= Asnoun =

Village in Zgharta District, Lebanon

Asnoun أصنون
- Village
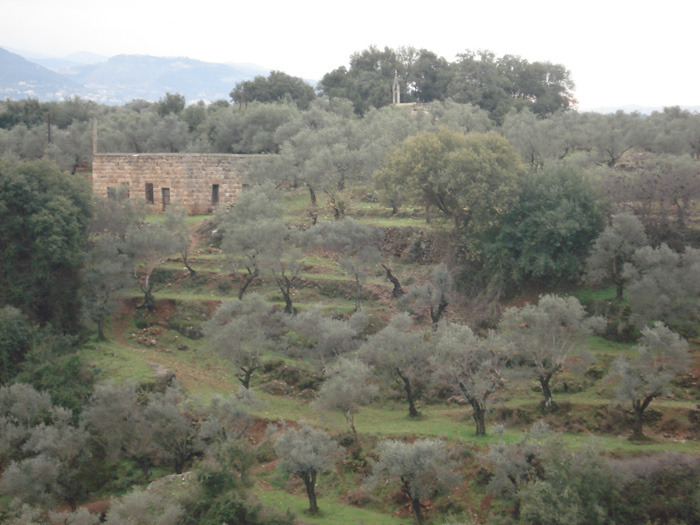
- Asnoun's olive trees.

- Location within Lebanon
- Coordinates: 34°23′15″N 35°53′11″E
- Country: Lebanon
- Governorate: North Governorate
- District: Zgharta District
- Time zone: UTC+2 (EET)
  - Summer (DST): UTC+3 (EEST)
- Dialing code: +961
- Website: http://asnounvillage.com/

Asnoun (Arabic: أصنون, romanized: ʾAṣnūn) is a small village in the Zgharta District, in the North Governorate of Lebanon. It is located 2 km south of the town of Zgharta.

The inhabitants of Asnoun are Lebanese and are followers of the Maronite Catholic Church. Its parish church and patron saint is Mar Yacoub (St. Jacob, also known as James, son of Zebedee, an apostle of Jesus), and his feast day is celebrated on 25 July each year. A second feast day is celebrated on 27 November each year to honour St. James Intercisus (also referred to as Mar Yacoub). An older church named after St. George can also be found amongst the olive trees in the village.

== Agriculture ==
Asnoun is full of olive trees and is a main producer of olives and olive oil. Grape vines can also be found in front of most houses.

== Education ==
Asnoun has one public elementary school.

== Families ==
Families of Asnoun include Kahwaji, Melki, Fares, Khawaja, Aam, Yaghmour, Lebnan, Gebran, Chab, Aoun, Khairallah, among others.

== Photo gallery ==
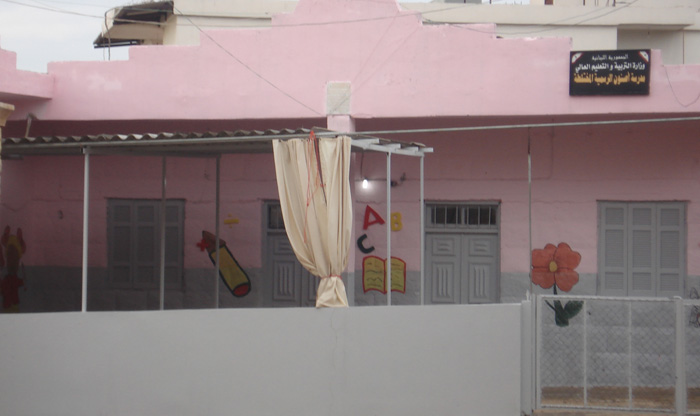
Asnoun's elementary school.

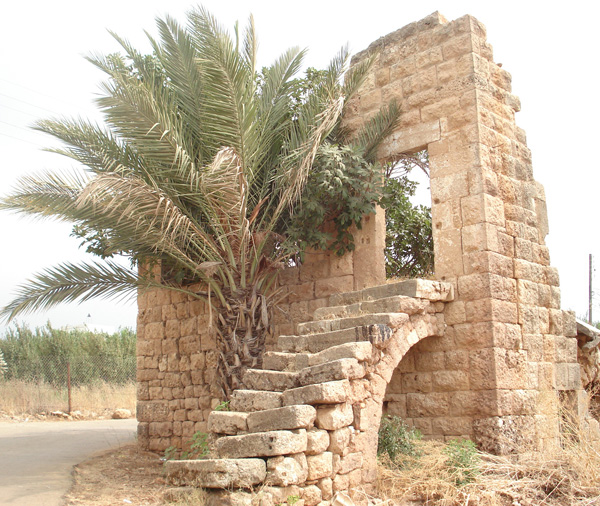
An old house in Asnoun belonging to the Chab family.

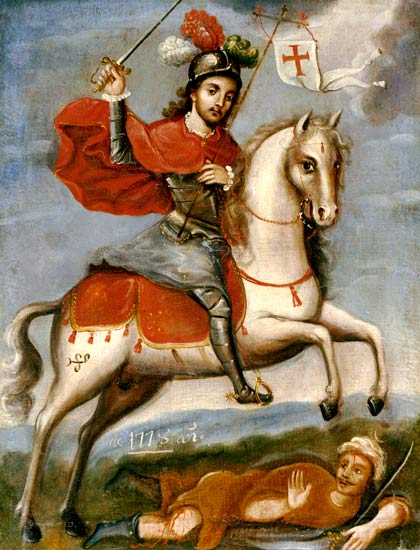
Saint James the Moor-slayer.
