= Kfaryachit =

Village in Zgharta District, Lebanon

Karyachit كفرياشيت
- Village
- Location within Lebanon
- Coordinates: 34°20′46″N 35°53′40″E
- Country: Lebanon
- Governorate: North Governorate
- District: Zgharta District
- Elevation: 200 m (660 ft)
- Time zone: UTC+2 (EET)
  - Summer (DST): UTC+3 (EEST)
- Dialing code: +961

Kfaryachit (also Kafaryachit, Kfaryashit, Arabic: كفرياشيت, romanized: Kfaryāshīt) is a village located in the Zgharta District in the North Governorate of Lebanon. Its population is Maronite Catholic.
