= Kfarhata Zgharta =

Village in Zgharta District, Lebanon

Kfarhata كفرحاتا
- Village
- Location within Lebanon
- Coordinates: 34°22′58″N 35°53′51″E
- Country: Lebanon
- Governorate: North Governorate
- District: Zgharta District
- Elevation: 170 m (560 ft)
- Time zone: UTC+2 (EET)
  - Summer (DST): UTC+3 (EEST)
- Dialing code: +961

Kfarhata ( known also as Kfar Hata, Kafrhata, Arabic: كفرحاتا, romanized: Kfarḥātā) is a village located in the Zgharta District in the North Governorate of Lebanon. It is a mixed Maronite Christian and Sunni Muslim community.

It is home for the El Chemor family, once rulers of Zgharta Zawiyeh in the Ottomans era.
