= Kfardlakos =

Village in Zgharta District, Lebanon

Kfardlakos, Kfar Dlaqous, Kfardlaqous, (Arabic: كفر دلاقوس, romanized: Kfar Dlāqūs) is a village in Zgharta District, in the North Governorate of Lebanon. Its population is predominantly Maronite Christians.
