= Beit Awkar =

Village in Zgharta District, Lebanon

Coordinates: 34.4327°N 35.9170°E

Beit Awkar, Beit Okar, Beit Aoukar (Arabic: بيت عوكر, romanized: Bayt Awkar, locally Beit Ōkar) is a village in Zgharta District, in the North Governorate of Lebanon. It is located 15 km to the east of Tripoli, 10 km from Zgharta.

The people of the village are predominantly Maronite Christians.

It has a beautiful nature and a strategic view over Tripoli, Zgharta, Koura, and part of Dunnieh and Bsharreh mountains. It is well known for having a high level of educated people and priests. Amongst notable people from the village is Mary Rose Oakar, a 27-year-old congresswoman and a fighter for Arabic rights in the United States.
