= Mejdlaya =

Village in Zgharta District, Lebanon

Mejdlaya مجدليّا
- Location in Lebanon
- Coordinates: 34°25′14″N 35°52′15″E
- Country: Lebanon
- Governorate: North Governorate
- District: Zgharta District
- Time zone: UTC+2 (EET)
  - Summer (DST): +3

Mejdlaya, Mejdlaiya, (Arabic: مجدليّا, romanized: Mejdlayyā) is a village in Zgharta District, in the Northern Governorate of Lebanon.

The population is Maronite and Greek Orthodox Christian.
