= Kadrieh =

Village in Zgharta District, Lebanon

Kadrieh or Khadiriyé (Levantine Arabic: قادريه, romanized: Qādriyeh) is a Sunni Muslim village in Zgharta District, in the North Governorate of Lebanon.
