= Jdaydeh =

Village in Zgharta District, in the North Governorate of Lebanon

Coordinates: 33°53′30″N 35°34′11″E

Jdaydeh (Arabic: جديدة) is a village in Zgharta District, in the North Governorate of Lebanon. Its population is Maronite Catholic.
