= Kfarhawra =

Village in Zgharta District, in the North Governorate of Lebanon

Kfarhawra is a village in Zgharta District, in the North Governorate of Lebanon.
