= Haret Al Fawar =

Village in Zgharta District, Lebanon

Haret Al Fawar حارة الفوار
- Village
- Interactive map of Haret Al Fawar
- Coordinates: 34.4328°N 35.8884°E
- Country: Lebanon
- Governorate: North Governorate
- District: Zgharta District
- Elevation: 196 m (643 ft)

Haret Al Fawar (Arabic: حارة الفوار, romanized: Ḥāret al-Fawār) is a village in Zgharta District, in the Northern Governorate of Lebanon. Its population is composed of Maronite Christians and Sunni Muslims.

The village is located on a foothill of Terboul Mountain, surrounded by valleys. It stands 196 metres (643 ft) above sea level. There's a mosque in the old section of the village. As well as a modern hall for Islamic occasions such as weddings and the celebration of Mawlid of the Islamic prophet Muhammad. More than 80% of its population are Muslims, and most are with AICP (Association of Islamic Charitable Projects).

== Etymology ==
The village's name, which translates to "bubbling lane," originates from an old stream.

== History ==
For the past 100 years, the village has been populated by three main families: Awik, Jalloul, and Tabbaa. During the Lebanese Civil War, from 1975 until 1990, the village witnessed much destruction due to bombardment from the war. As it was considered strategic with a good view of the surrounding areas.
