= Bchennine =

Human settlement in Lebanon

Coordinates: 34.3478°N 35.8590°E

Bchennine, Bchannine, (Arabic: بشنين, romanized: Bshanīn) is a village in Zgharta District, in the Northern Governorate of Lebanon. Its population is predominantly Maronite Catholic.

The town is home to Lebanon's only industrial-scale ammunition factory, North Ammunition Industries.
