= Besbeel =

Village in Zgharta District, Lebanon

Besbeel or Besebaal (Arabic: بسبعل, romanized: Besbaʿl) is a village in Zgharta District, in the Northern Governorate of Lebanon.
