= Kfarzeina =

Village in Zgharta District, Lebanon

Coordinates: 34.3669°N 35.8783°E

Kfarzeina, Kfarzaina, (Arabic: كفر زينا, romanized: Kfar Zaynā) is a village in Zgharta District, in the Northern Governorate of Lebanon. Its population is predominantly Maronite Christian.
