= Aslout =

Village in Zgharta District, Lebanon

Coordinates: 34°20′N 35°58′E

Aslout (Arabic: أسلوت, romanized: ʾAslūt) is a village in Zgharta District, in the Northern Governorate of Lebanon. It is a Maronite Christian community.
