= Harf Ardeh =

Village in Zgharta District, Lebanon

Coordinates: 34°23′56″N 35°54′47″E

Harf Ardeh or Harf Arden, (Arabic: حرف ارده, romanized: Ḥarf Ārdeh) is a village in Zgharta District, in the Northern Governorate of Lebanon.
