= Beit Obeid =

Human settlement in Lebanon

34.431053589703396°N 35.920036834490844°E Beit Obeid, Beit Abid (Levantine Arabic: بيت عبيد, romanized: Bayt ʿUbayd) is a village in Zgharta District, in the Northern Governorate of Lebanon.
