= Aarjes =

Village in Zgharta District, Lebanon

Aarjes عرجس
- Location in Lebanon
- Coordinates: 34°19′51″N 35°52′53″E
- Country: Lebanon
- Governorate: North Governorate
- District: Zgharta District
- Elevation: 950 ft (290 m)
- Time zone: UTC+2 (EET)
  - Summer (DST): +3

Aarjes (Arabic: عرجس, romanized: ʿArjis), also Arjis, Arjess or Aarjess, is a village located in the Zgharta District in the North Governorate of Lebanon. Its population is Maronite Catholic.

== Demographics ==
In 2014, Christians made up 99.75% of registered voters in Aarjes. 96.55% of the voters were Maronite Catholics.
