= Rachiine =

Village in Zgharta District, Lebanon

Coordinates: 34.0121°N 35.7214°E

Rachiine (Arabic: رشعين, romanized: Rashʿīn) is a village in northern Lebanon, located in the Zgharta District of the North Governorate. The village's population is predominantly Maronite Christian.
