= Fraydiss =

Village in Zgharta District, in the Northern Governorate of Lebanon

Fraydiss is a village in Zgharta District, in the Northern Governorate of Lebanon.
