= Ashash =

Village in Zgharta District, Lebanon

Coordinates: 34.4153°N 35.9353°E

Ashash, Aachach, Achache or Aachache (also referred to as Deir Ashash) (Arabic: عشاش, romanized: ʿAshāsh) is a village in Zgharta District, in the Northern Governorate of Lebanon. Its population is solely Maronite Catholic.

Ashash is a located north of Zgharta; it has two schools, Ecole Al Amana Achache and St. George's School Achache. The head of the Achache municipality (رئيس البلدية) is Christo Naffah.

Throughout the month of September 1975, battles broke out in the north of Lebanon. On September 10, As-Sa'iqa Palestinian forces (Syrian backed) attacked the village of Deir Ashash and killed three priests (aged 60, 87, and 93) at the Deir Ashash monastery. All residents in the village had to flee.

== See also ==
- List of extrajudicial killings and political violence in Lebanon
