= Kfarfou =

Village in Zgharta District, Lebanon

Kfarfou كفرفو
- Village
- Location within Lebanon
- Coordinates: 34°19′05″N 35°52′48″E
- Country: Lebanon
- Governorate: North Governorate
- District: Zgharta District
- Elevation: 607 m (1,991 ft)
- Time zone: UTC+2 (EET)
  - Summer (DST): UTC+3 (EEST)
- Dialing code: +961

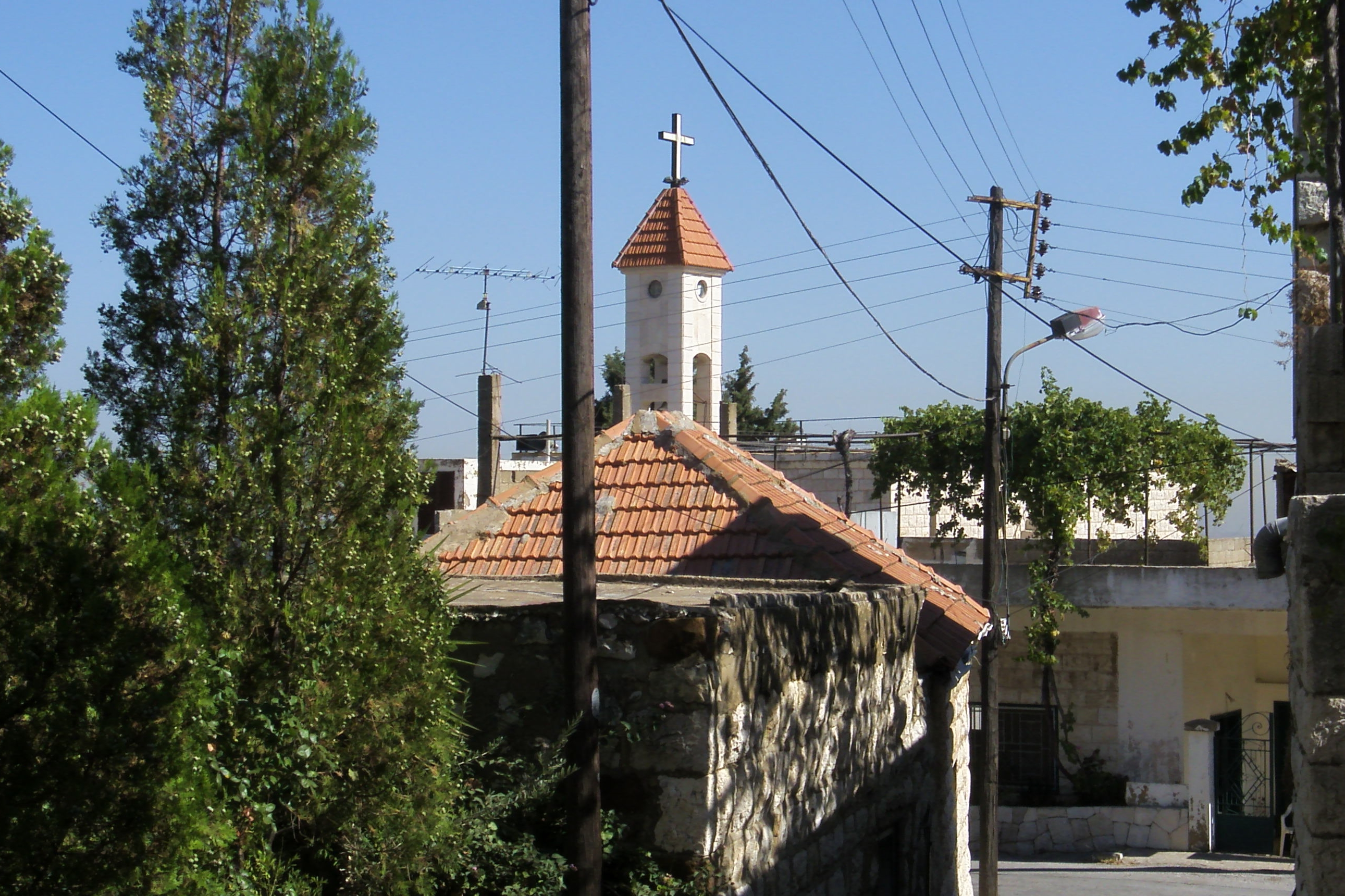

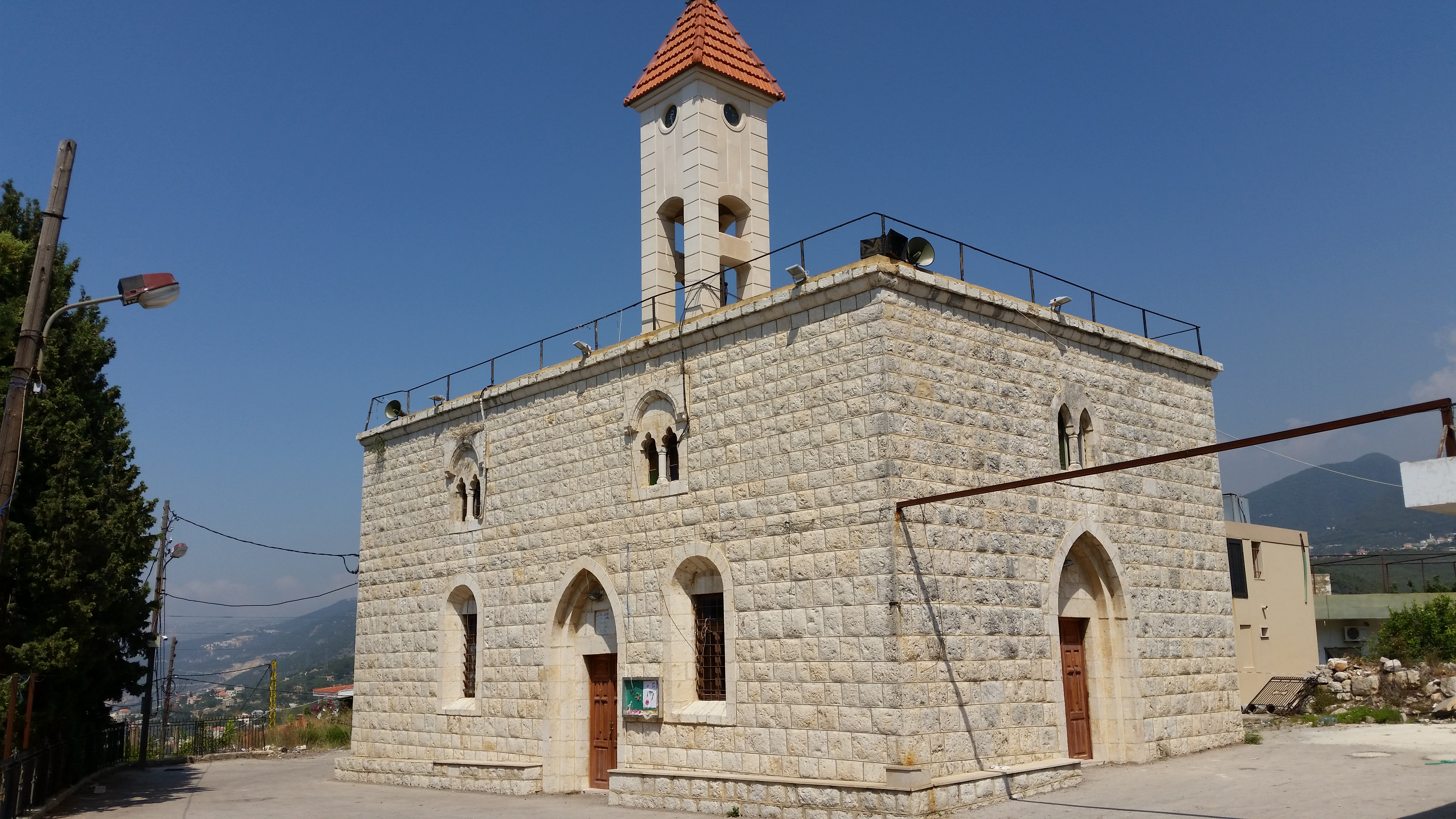
The church of the village

Kfarfou (also Kfar Fou, Kfarfu, Arabic: كفرفو, romanized: Kfarfū) is a village located in the Zgharta District in the North Governorate of Lebanon. Its population is Maronite Catholic.
