= Arbet Kozhaya =

Settlement in Zgharta District, Lebanon

Arbet Kozhaya عربة قزحيا
- City
- Location within Lebanon
- Coordinates: 34°17′42″N 35°55′32″E
- Country: Lebanon
- Governorate: North Governorate
- District: Zgharta District

Area
  - Total: 2.0 km^{2} (0.77 sq mi)
- Elevation: 1,000 m (3,300 ft)
- Time zone: UTC+2 (EET)
  - Summer (DST): UTC+3 (EEST)
- Dialing code: +961

Arbet Kozhaya, also known as Arbet Qozhaya or Arabet Kozhaya, (Arabic: عربة قزحيا, Syriac: ܥܪܒܐ ܕܩܙܚܝܐ) is one of the fifty-six towns and villages, which make up the Zgharta District (Zgharta Zawie) in the North Governorate of Lebanon.

The population is mainly Maronite Christian.

== Origin of the name ==
The village is named after the neighboring Monastery of Kozhaya, known as the Monastery of Saint Anthony the Great (Mar Antonios al-Kabir). The monastery is some 950 metres above sea level in the Valley of Kozhaya.

The word Arbet (Aarbet) means lodging, this is according to the history of the word in several languages.

The name Kozhaya is Syriac in origin and means the treasure of life, with treasure representing Christ, for whom the monks of the Monastery abandon worldly goods and follow an ascetic life dedicated to prayer and spirituality; and life referring to the abundance of water endowing nature with life in the valley.

== Facts and figures ==
The Kozhaya Valley and the nearby Qannoubine Valley are part of the Qadisha Valley, known also as the Holy Valley. The village lies between 900 and 1,050 metres above sea level and occupies some 2 million square metres, out of which approximatively 500,000 square metres are inhabited and 700,000 square metres under cultivation. It is at a distance of 5 Kilometres from Ehden, 25 Kilometres from Zgharta, 30 Kilometres from the Cedars and 85 Kilometres from Beirut.

The village church is dedicated to Saint Elias and the Saint’s Feast day is celebrated on the 20th of July. There is a nearby hotel, one restaurant, two small food shops and a medical centre built by the Fayez Mouawad Foundation. There is also a volleyball court built in the beginning of 1990s. Freshwater is supplied to the village by two springs one being called Al-Fas´in.

The village has not had a school since the 1980s. The first school opened in the mid-19th Century whose teachers were priests and monks from the Monastery of Saint Anthony the Great. The present generation of school children go to nearby schools at Al-Koura, technical college students going to local colleges in the region. Those attending university live away during term time. As historians; the first printing press in modern history was made by Maronites in Kozhaya area in Lebanon in 1610 AD.

=== Population statistics ===
This article uses a study based on data for 2001-2002.

The study shows that the village population was recorded at 294 persons of whom 52.10% were male and 46.90% were female. The average age was 32 years, with almost half the population under the age of 45.

Of the recorded 82 households in the study, 32 households lived elsewhere in Lebanon and 50 households lived permanently in the village. The study also showed that there were 44 families who emigrated up to 2002 and their destinations were: Australia 16; Canada 11; Venezuela 8; USA 4; France 3; Brazil 2.

Other sites show that in 1849, there were 179 males and 31 households. In 1988 there were 1,031 persons registered and in 1998 there were 977 persons registered. The official 2005 General Election registry for the village accounted for 720 registered voters (355 women and 365 men), including those living away but registered.

== Municipal council ==
The village elects a municipal council returning nine members and an elected Mukhtar.

== See also ==
- Monastery of Saint Anthony of Qozhaya
- Toula Zgharta
