= Basloukit =

Human settlement in Lebanon

Coordinates: 34°18′28.22″N 35°58′03.62″E

Basloukit or Beslouqit (Arabic: بسلوقيط, romanized: Baslūqīṭ) is a village in Zgharta District, in the Northern Governorate of Lebanon.

The people of the village are predominantly Maronite Christians.
