= Bousit =

Village in Zgharta District, Lebanon

Bousit بوسيط
- Village
- Location within Lebanon
- Coordinates: 34.4380°N 35.9264°E
- Country: Lebanon
- Governorate: North Governorate
- District: Zgharta District
- Elevation: 573 m (1,880 ft)

Population (2015)
  - Total: 198
- Time zone: UTC+2 (EET)
  - Summer (DST): UTC+3 (EEST)
- Dialing code: +961

Bousit, or Boussit (Arabic: بوسيط, romanized: Būsīṭ) is a village in Zgharta District, in the Northern Governorate of Lebanon. As of 2015, it has a population of 198 and the majority is Greek Orthodox. Located at an altitude of 573 m, it is known for its vineyards, as well as for the cultivation of wheat and olives.
