= Bnachii =

Village in Zgharta District, Lebanon

Bnachii بنشعي
- Village
- Location within Lebanon
- Coordinates: 34°19′58″N 35°53′43″E
- Country: Lebanon
- Governorate: North Governorate
- District: Zgharta District
- Elevation: 450 m (1,480 ft)
- Time zone: UTC+2 (EET)
  - Summer (DST): UTC+3 (EEST)
- Dialing code: +961

Bnashii (also Bnashaai, Bneshaai, Bnechaai, Bnash'i, Arabic: بنشعي, romanized: Bnashʿī) is a village located in the Zgharta District in the North Governorate of Lebanon.

The altitude of the village is 450 meters above sea level. It has a leisure base around its artificial lake.

In 1866, the village was the witness of an important battle between 800 lebanese nationalists led by Youssef Bey Karam and a numerically superior ottoman contingent led by Daoud Pasha.
