= Ejbeh =

Village in the Zgharta District in the North Governorate of Lebanon

Ejbeh اجبع
- City
- Location within Lebanon
- Coordinates: 34°18′33″N 35°56′37″E
- Country: Lebanon
- Governorate: North Governorate
- District: Zgharta District
- Elevation: 1,182 m (3,878 ft)
- Time zone: UTC+2 (EET)
  - Summer (DST): UTC+3 (EEST)
- Dialing code: +961

Ejbeh (also Ejbaa, 'Ijbi‘, Ijba‘, Arabic: اجبع) is a village in the Zgharta District in the North Governorate of Lebanon. Its population is Maronite Catholic. As of 2022, the village had 165 registered voters, 31 of whom were Diaspora voters.
