= Zgharta District =

Zgharta Alzawieh District
- District
- زغرتا الزاوية
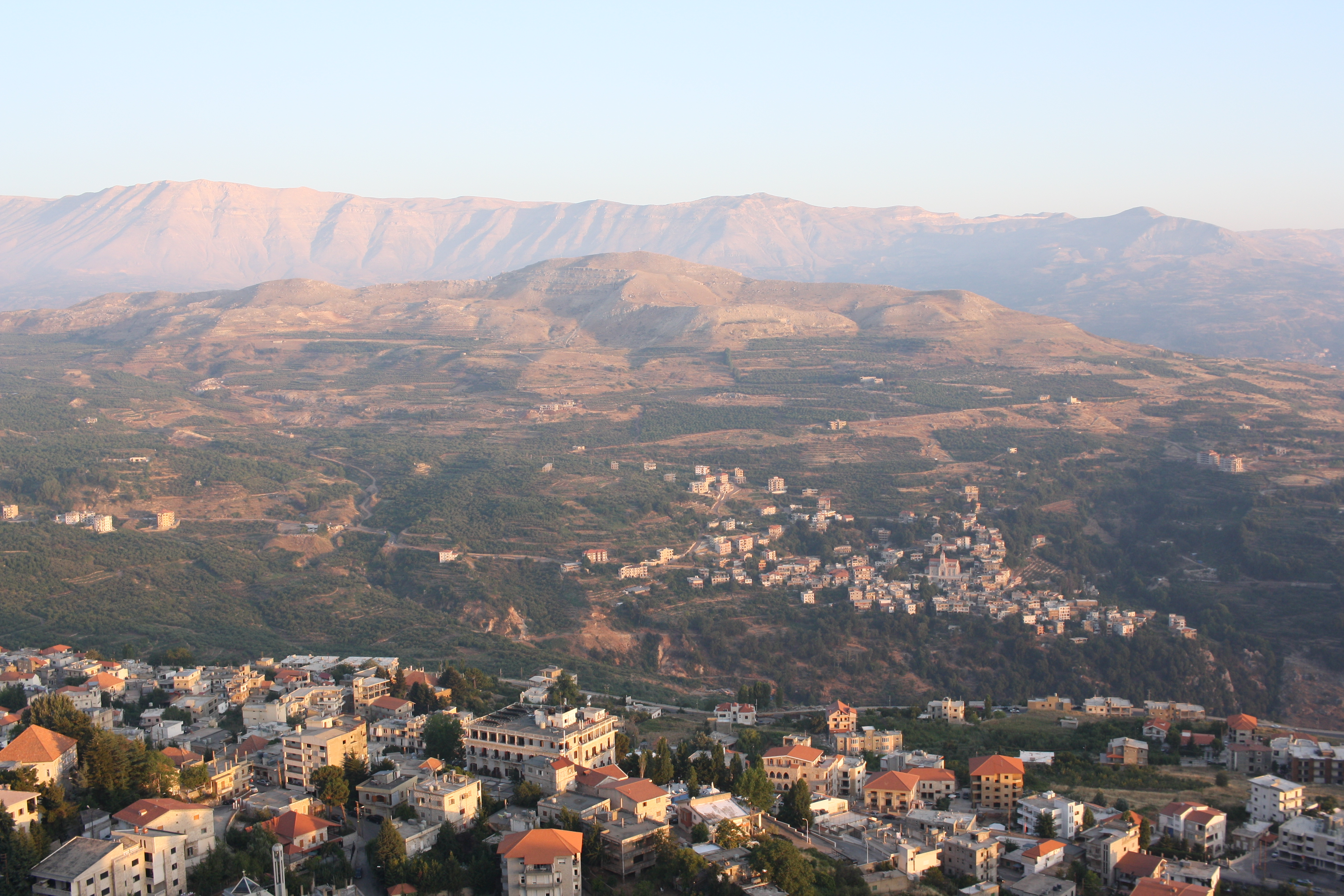
- Zgharta Alzawieh District

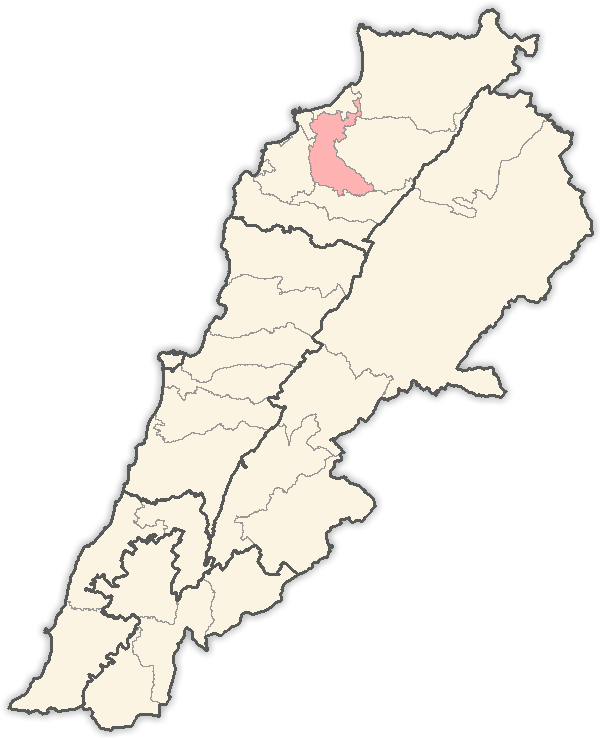
- Location in Lebanon
- Country: Lebanon
- Governorate: North Governorate
- Capital: Zgharta

Area
  - Total: 70 sq mi (182 km^{2})

Population
  - Estimate (31 December 2017): 81,490
- Time zone: UTC+2 (EET)
  - Summer (DST): UTC+3 (EEST)

Zgharta Alzawieh District (Arabic: زغرتا الزاوية, romanized: Zgharta az-Zāwiyeh) is a district (qadaa) of the North Governorate, northern Lebanon. Its capital is the city of Zgharta.

== Geography ==
The administrative center is the city of Zgharta. The district has 101 populated areas with 30 municipalities covering 37 villages. Some areas share the same municipality such as Ehden/Zgharta, Kfarsghab/Morh Kfarsghab, and Miziara/Harf Miziara. And there is one Municipalities Union.

The district has a population of around 81,490.

The district elevation is about 40 meters along the coast line and clmbs up to a height of 2,550 meters at the highest point of the Mount Lebanon mountain range.

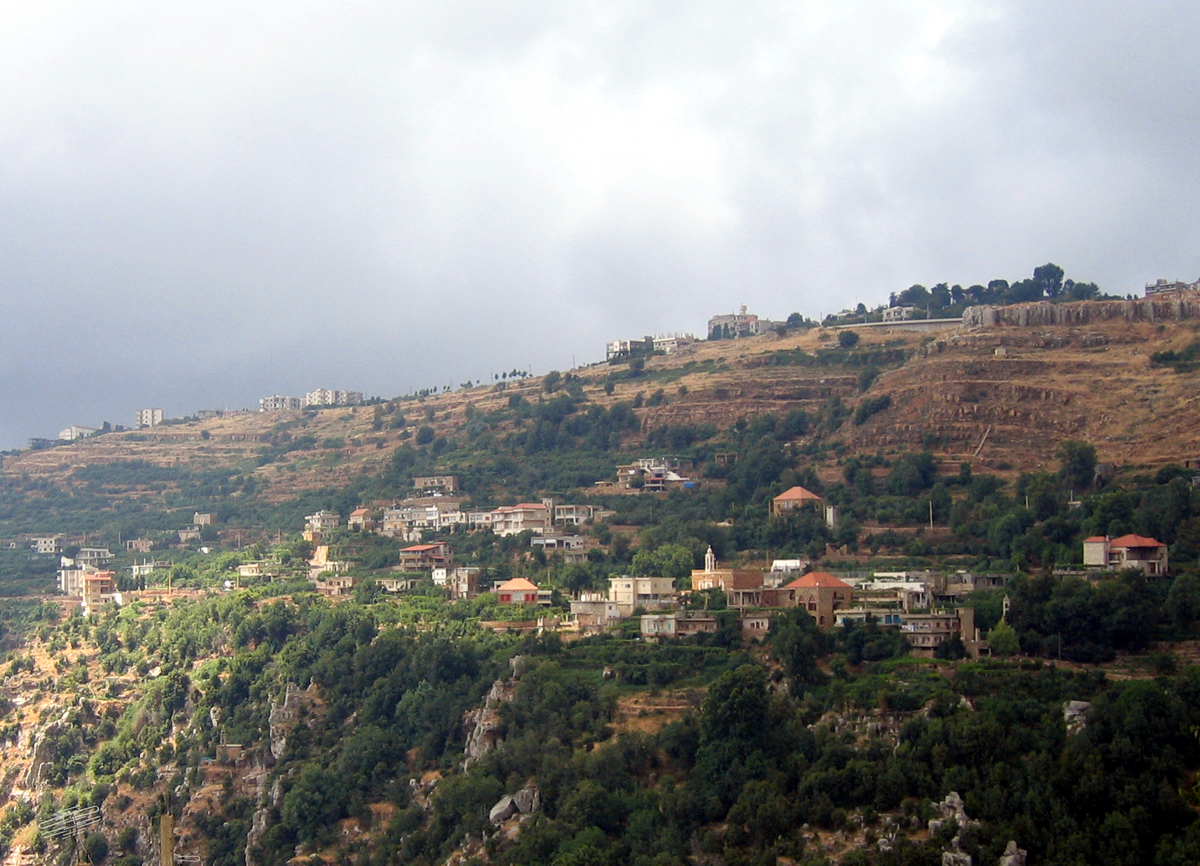
Aintourine, Zgharta District

The highest populated part of the district overlooks the Qozhaya Valley, which is the northern branch of the Holy Valley of Qadisha, a UNESCO World Heritage Site. The Horsh Ehden Nature Reserve is in the mountains within the district. This higher part of the district is a visitor destination, including the Monastery of Mar Sarkis and the Monastery of Qozhaya areas.

== Economy ==
Agriculture stays the main activity of the district with an important olive oil production in the coastal area and fruits (apple and pears) in the mountain area. The recent years saw the development of a modest service sector around the economic pole of Zgharta.

Tourism also plays a big role in the district's economy. The main tourism hotspot in the Zgharta District is undoubtedly Ehden, which sees an influx of tourists every summer, as many people from around the country visit the mountain town. There are many religious tourism sites, such as the Monastery of Qozhaya, Mar Mema Church (the oldest standing Maronite church in the world), Saydet Al Marahem in Miziara and the famous Saydet El Hosn (Lady of the Fortress) in Ehden.

== Demographics ==
The officially registered population of the district was estimated to 90,000 in 1998. Around 50% of residents live in the economic pole of Zgharta: Zgharta, Rachiine, Kfardlakos, Kfarhata, Mijdlayiah, Ardeh, Harf Ardeh. The main other significantly populated areas are Miryata and Miziara.

According to registered voters in 2014:

| Year | Christians | | | | | Muslims | | | | Druze |
| Year | Total | Maronites | Greek Orthodox | Greek Catholics | Other Christians | Total | Sunnis | Shias | Alawites | Druze |
|---|---|---|---|---|---|---|---|---|---|---|
| 2014 | 87.10% | 79.42% | 5.67% | 1.11% | 0.90% | 12.69% | 12.41% | 0.19% | 0.09% | 0.01% |
| 2018 | 86.81% | 78.92% | 5.65% | 1.12% | 1.12% | 13.17% | 12.88% | 0.19% | 0.1% | 0.01% |
| 2022 | 86.25% | 78.79% | 5.72% | 1.15% | 0.59% | 13.75% | 13.69% | 0.04% | 0.02% | 0.00% |
| 2026 | 85.65% | 80.47% | 4.11% | —N/a | 1.07% | 14.35% | 14.35% | 0.00% | 0.00% | 0.00% |

In 2022, there were 81,959 registered voters in the Zgharta district.

Number of registered voters (21+ years old) over the years.

| Years | Men | Women | Total | Growth (%) |
|---|---|---|---|---|
| 2009 | 35,567 | 35,770 | 71,337 | —N/a |
| 2010 | 35,690 ▲ | 35,879 ▲ | 71,569 ▲ | +0.32% ▲ |
| 2011 | 35,765 ▲ | 35,909 ▲ | 71,674 ▲ | +0.15% ▼ |
| 2012 | 36,244 ▲ | 36,375 ▲ | 72,619 ▲ | +1.30% ▲ |
| 2013 | 36,911 ▲ | 36,906 ▲ | 73,817 ▲ | +1.62% ▲ |
| 2014 | 37,340 ▲ | 37,420 ▲ | 74,760 ▲ | +1.26% ▼ |
| 2015 | 37,762 ▲ | 37,765 ▲ | 75,527 ▲ | +1.02% ▼ |
| 2016 | 38,159 ▲ | 38,326▲ | 76,485 ▲ | +1.25% ▲ |
| 2017 | 38,626 ▲ | 38,726 ▲ | 77,352 ▲ | +1.12% ▼ |
| 2018 | 39,077 ▲ | 39,106 ▲ | 78,183 ▲ | +1.06% ▼ |
| 2019 | 39,821 ▲ | 39,869 ▲ | 79,690 ▲ | +1.89% ▲ |
| 2020 | 40,286 ▲ | 40,279 ▲ | 80,565 ▲ | +1.09% ▼ |
| 2021 | 40,595 ▲ | 40,533 ▲ | 81,128 ▲ | +0.69% ▼ |
| 2022 | 41,053 ▲ | 40,906 ▲ | 81,959 ▲ | +1.01% ▲ |
| 2023 | 41,222 ▲ | 41,009 ▲ | 82,231 ▲ | +0.33% ▼ |
| 2024 | 41,529 ▲ | 41,260 ▲ | 82,789 ▲ | +0.67% ▲ |
| 2025 | 41,688 ▲ | 41,471 ▲ | 83,159 ▲ | +0.44% ▼ |
| 2026 | —N/a | —N/a | 83,682 ▲ | +0.62% ▲ |
Source: DGCS

== Towns and villages ==
| Village | Arabic name | GPS Coord | Population 1998 |
|---|---|---|---|
| Aarjes | عرجس | 34°19′51″N 35°52′53″E | |
| Aintourine | عينتورين | 34°17′06″N 35°57′25″E | |
| Aitou | أيطو | 34°18′31″N 35°55′11″E | |
| Alma | علما | | |
| Arbet Kozhaya | عربة قزحيا | 34°17′42″N 35°55′32″E | |
| Ardeh | ارده | | |
| Achach | عشاش | | |
| Aslout | اسلوت | | |
| Asnoun | اصنون | 34°23′15″N 35°53′11″E | |
| Basloukit | بسلوقيت | | |
| Bchennine | بشنين | | |
| Beit Awkar | بيت عوكر | | |
| Beit Obeid | بيت عبيد | | |
| Besbeel | بسبعل | | |
| Bhairet Toula | بحيرة تولا | 34°19′23″N 35°58′15″E | |
| Bnachii | بنشعي | 34°19′58″N 35°53′43″E | |
| Bousit | بوسيط | | |
| Daraya | داريا | 34°19′44″N 35°52′07″E | |
| Ehden | إهدن | | |
| Ejbeh | اجبع | 34°18′33″N 35°56′37″E | |
| Fraydiss | مزرعة الفريديس | | |
| Haret Al Fawar | حارة الفوار | 34°25′57″N 35°53′13″E | |
| Harf Ardeh | حرف أرده | | |
| Harf Miziara | حرف مزيارة | 34°20′06″N 35°56′23″E | |
| Hawqa | حوقا | 34°16′20″N 35°56′30″E | |
| Hilan | حيلان | | |
| Houmeiss | حميص | 34°19′43″N 35°55′59″E | |
| Iaal | ايعال | 34°22′N 35°55′E | |
| Jdaydeh | جديدة | | |
| Kadrieh | القادرية | | |
| Karahbache | قره باش | 34°23′37″N 35°53′40″E | |
| Karmsaddeh | كرمسدة | 34°18′21″N 35°53′23″E | |
| Kfardlakos | كفردلاقوس | | |
| Kfarfou | كفرفو | 34°19′05″N 35°52′48″E | |
| Kfarhawra | كفرحورا | | |
| Kfarsghab | كفرصغاب | 34°16′42″N 35°57′44″E | |
| Kfarshakhna | كفرشخنا | | |
| Kfarhata | كفرحاتا | 34°22′58″N 35°53′51″E | |
| Kfaryachit | كفرياشيت | 34°20′46″N 35°53′40″E | |
| Kfarzeina | كفرزينا | | |
| Khaldieh | خالدية | | |
| Kifraya | كفريا | | |
| Mazraat En Nahr | مزرعة النهر | 34°16′50″N 35°53′54″E | |
| Mazraat Al Toufah | مزرعة التفاح | | |
| Mazraat Hraikis | مزرعة حريقص | | |
| Mejdlaya | مجدليا | | |
| Miriata | مرياطه | | |
| Miziara | مزيارة | 34°19′58″N 35°55′49″E | |
| Morh Kfarsghab | مرح كفرصغاب | 34°20′11″N 35°54′12″E | |
| Rachiine | رشعين | | |
| Raskifa | راسكيفا | 34°18′38″N 35°52′01″E | |
| Sakhra | صخرا | | |
| Sebhel | سبعل | 34°18′53″N 35°54′31″E | |
| Sereel | سرعل | 34°17′24″N 35°54′41″E | |
| Toula | تولا | 34°19′03″N 35°57′49″E | |
| Zgharta | زغرتا | | |
