= Sebhel =

Village in Zgharta District, Lebanon

Sebeel سبعل
- Village
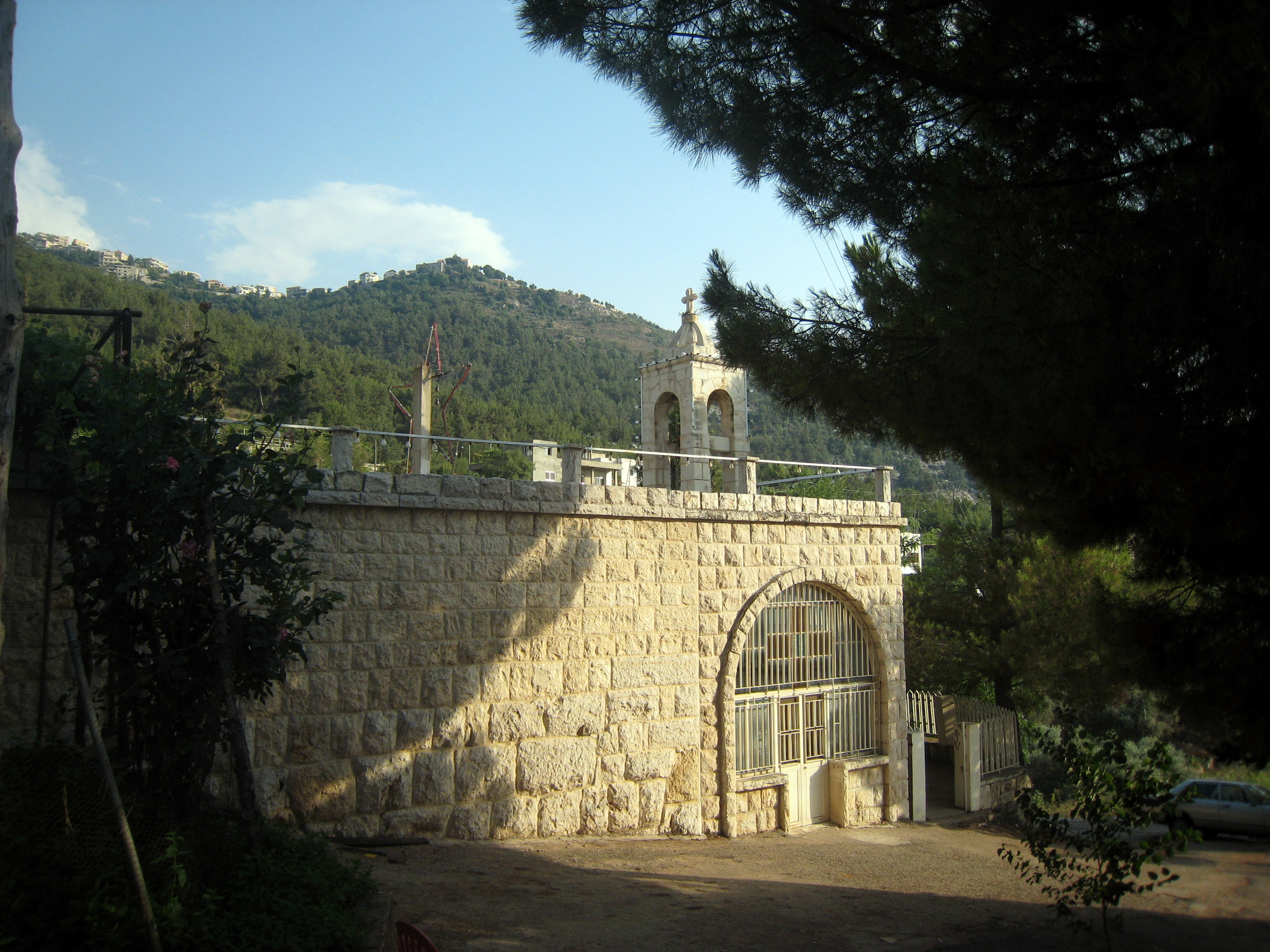
- Church in Sebhel

- Location within Lebanon
- Coordinates: 34°18′53″N 35°54′31″E
- Country: Lebanon
- Governorate: North Governorate
- District: Zgharta District
- Elevation: 750 m (2,460 ft)
- Time zone: UTC+2 (EET)
  - Summer (DST): UTC+3 (EEST)
- Dialing code: +961

Sebhel (also Sib'il, Sebaail, Sebeel, Arabic: سبعل, romanized: Sibʿil) is a village located in the Zgharta District in the North Governorate of Lebanon. Its population is Maronite Catholic.
