= Sereel =

Village in Zgharta District, Lebanon

Sereel سرعل
- City
- Location within Lebanon
- Coordinates: 34°17′24″N 35°54′41″E
- Country: Lebanon
- Governorate: North Governorate
- District: Zgharta District
- Elevation: 521 m (1,709 ft)
- Time zone: UTC+2 (EET)
  - Summer (DST): UTC+3 (EEST)
- Dialing code: +961

Sereel ( known also as Siriil or Sir'il, Arabic: سرعل) is a village located in the Zgharta District in the North Governorate of Lebanon. It is situated in the valley of Qozhaya, the northern branch of the Valley of Qadisha.

Its population is mainly Maronite Catholic.

The origin of the name Serhel is Syriac, meaning "the elevated wall." The town is known for its pine forest, which also has some oak trees, in addition to a number of springs, including the Spring of Seraal. At an elevation of approximately 2,600 feet, the village has views of the lower Kadisha valley to the east and from higher up in its pine forest a view of the Sahel down to the city of Tripoli and the Mediterranean Sea.

Serhel is home to a number of caves, including the cave of Bint Al-Malak ("the king's daughter"), Al-Zwayyet cave, and Ain Al-Mghara cave. Religious sites in the village include the ancient Church of the Angel Michael, dating to 1893; the Grotto of Our Lady of Salvation; the Church of Saint Georges; the Church of Mar Sarkis and Bakhos; and the Church of Mar Challita.

During the presidency of Suleiman Frangieh in the 1970s, a highway was built passing through the center of Serhel and linking Beirut and Shikka on the coast to Ehden and the Kadisha Gorge higher up on Mount Lebanon. The construction of this highway made the village of Serhel more accessible, and facilitated the construction of a large hotel and spa, Le Tournant, on the outskirts of the town.
