= North Governorate =

Governorate of Lebanon

North Governorate محافظة الشمال
- Map of Lebanon with North Governorate highlighted
- Coordinates: 34°26′N 35°51′E
- Country: Lebanon
- Capital: Tripoli

Government
  - Governor: Vacant since 14 May 2025

Area
  - Total: 1,236.8 km^{2} (477.5 sq mi)

Population
  - Total: 807,204
  - Density: 652.66/km^{2} (1,690.4/sq mi)
- Time zone: UTC+2 (EET)
  - Summer (DST): UTC+3 (EEST)

North Governorate (Arabic: الشمال, romanized: Muḥāfaẓat ash-Shamāl) is one of the governorates of Lebanon and one of the two governorates of North Lebanon. Its capital is Tripoli. Ramzi Nohra was the governor from May 2, 2014 until May 14, 2025 when the Ministry of Interior dismissed him. The population of North Governorate is 731,251.

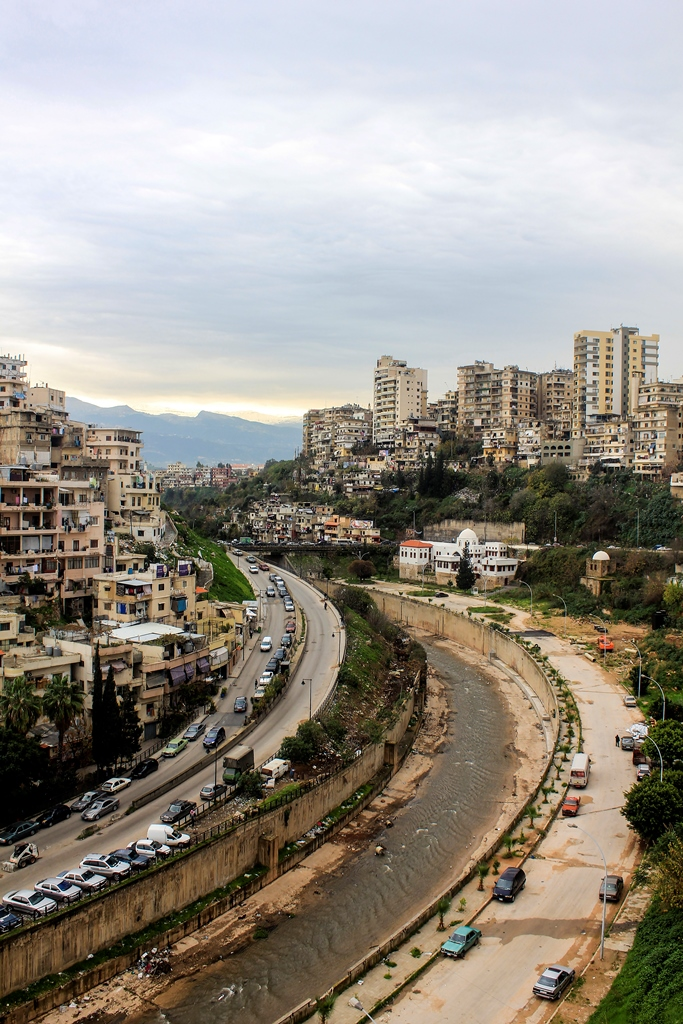
Tripoli, Capital of the North Governorate

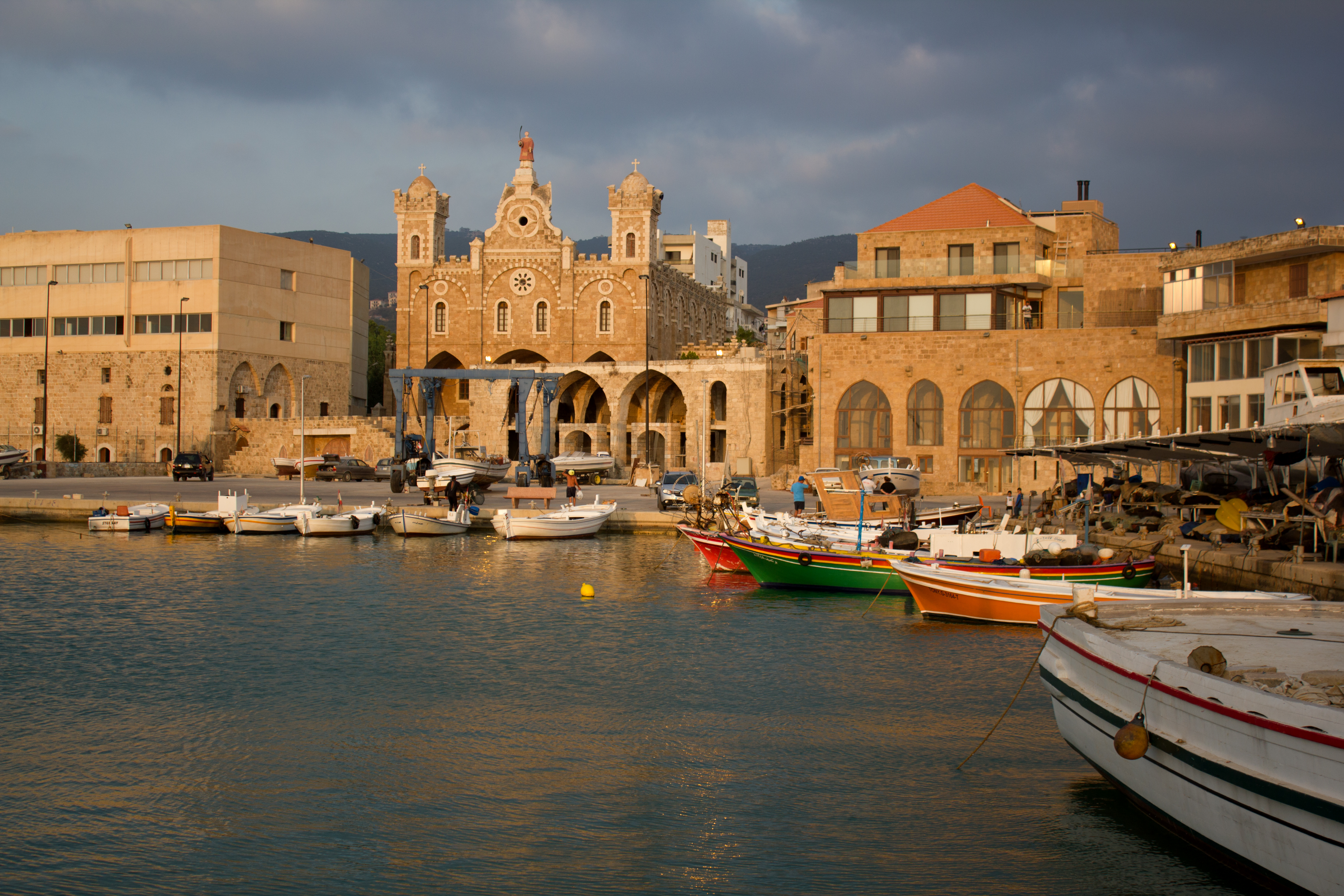
Batroun port, North Governorate

== Districts ==
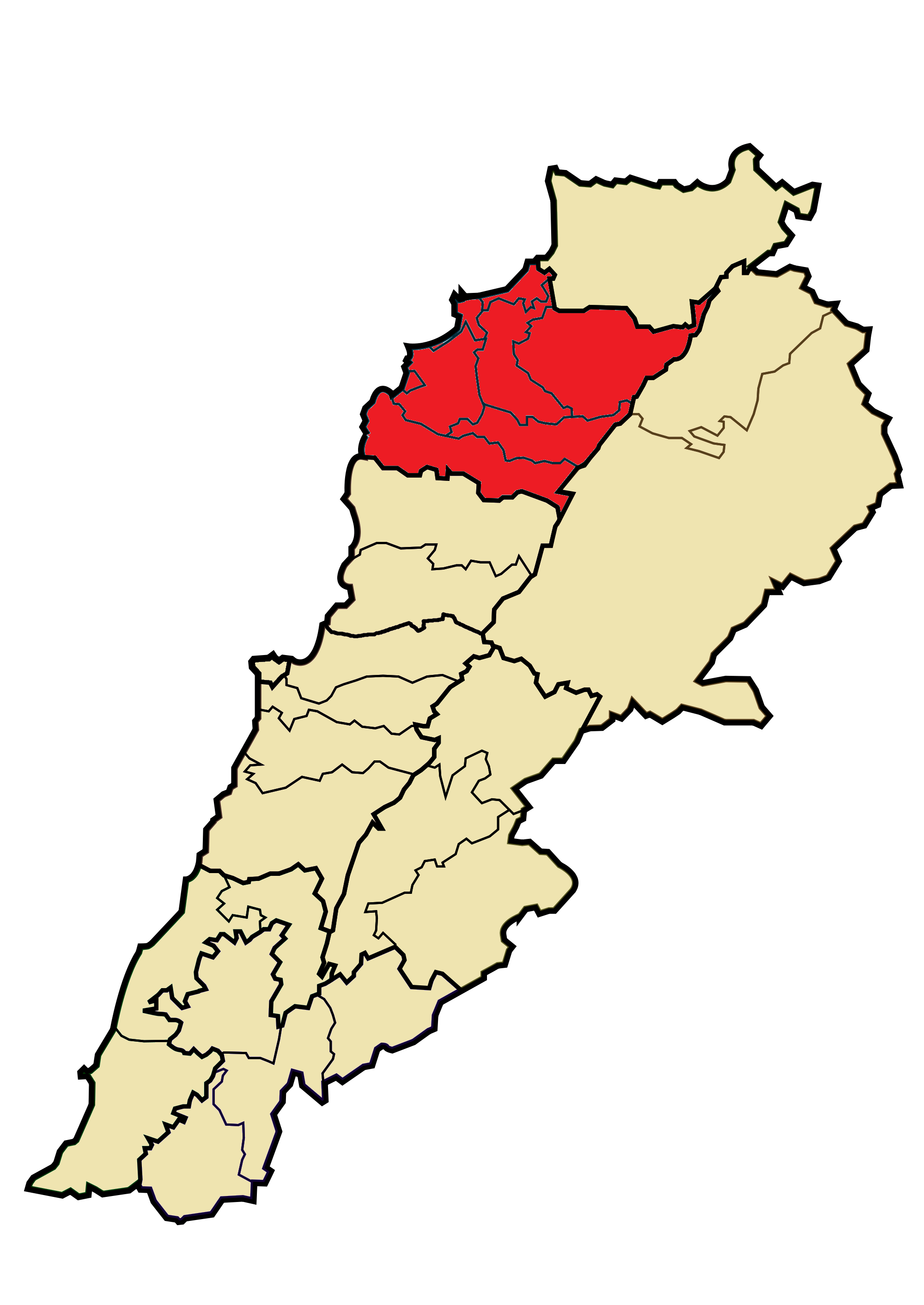
North Governorate

North Governorate is divided into districts, or aqdya. The districts are listed below (capitals in parentheses):

- Batroun (Batroun)
- Bsharri (Bsharri)
- Koura (Amioun)
- Miniyeh-Danniyeh (Miniyeh)
- Tripoli (Tripoli)
- Zgharta (Zgharta / Ehden)

A law was passed in 2003 by former Prime Minister Rafik Hariri to separate Akkar District from North Governorate and form a new governorate, Akkar Governorate. Implementation of Akkar Governorate began in 2014 with the appointment of its first governor. Top attractions in North Governorate include places such as the Cedars of God, Qadisha Valley, Gibran Museum, historical Hammams of Tripoli, Mansouri Great Mosque, Citadel Saint Gilles, Phoenician Wall, Deir Qozhaya, Khan Al-Khayyatin, Horsh Ehden Nature Reserve, Ixsir (winery), St. Stephan's Cathedral, Tannourine Cedar Forest Nature Reserve and Baatara Pothole.

== Demographics ==
According to registered voters in 2014:

Religion in the North Governorate
1. Sunni Islam (51.0%)
2. Shia Islam (0.93%)
3. Alawite (2.76%)
4. Christianity (45.0%)
5. Other (0.41%)
Religion in the North Governorate including Akkar Governorate
1. Sunni Islam (55.8%)
2. Shia Islam (1.00%)
3. Alawite (3.42%)
4. Christianity (39.5%)
5. Other (0.34%)

Year	Christians					Muslims				Druze
Year	Total	Maronites	Greek Orthodox	Greek Catholics	Other Christians	Total	Sunnis	Alawites	Shias	Druze
2014	44.95%	30.34%	12.47%	1.00%	1.14%	54.63%	50.95%	2.76%	0.93%	0.01%

Sunnis make up the overwhelming majority in the city of Tripoli and the Minyeh and Danniyeh districts with some presence in Zgharta and the Koura districts, Alawites are present only in a small part in the city of Tripoli, while Christians make up the overwhelming majority in Zgharta, Batroun, Bsharri and Koura districts (91% based on registered voters). According to the 2018 general election, 52.9% of the electorate was Sunni, while 44% was Christian, mainly Maronites and Orthodox; a very small percentage was Alawite or Shia Muslim. This however does not include the population under 18 years nor non-nationals (including both Syrians and Palestinians).

=== Electoral Constituencies and Confessional Distribution ===
The North governorate is divided into two separate electoral constituencies: North II (Tripoli-Minnieh-Danniyeh) and North III (Batroun-Zghorta-Koura-Bsharri).

North II's seats are distributed as follows:

- 8 Sunni Muslims (5 in Tripoli, 1 in Minnieh, 2 in Dennieh)
- 1 Alawite Muslim (in Tripoli)
- 1 Maronite Christian (in Tripoli)
- 1 Orthodox Christian (in Tripoli)

North III's seats are distributed as follows:

- 7 Maronite (2 in Batroun, 2 in Bsharri, 3 in Zgharta)
- 3 Orthodox (all in Koura district)
