= History of Kfarsghab =

History of a village in Lebanon

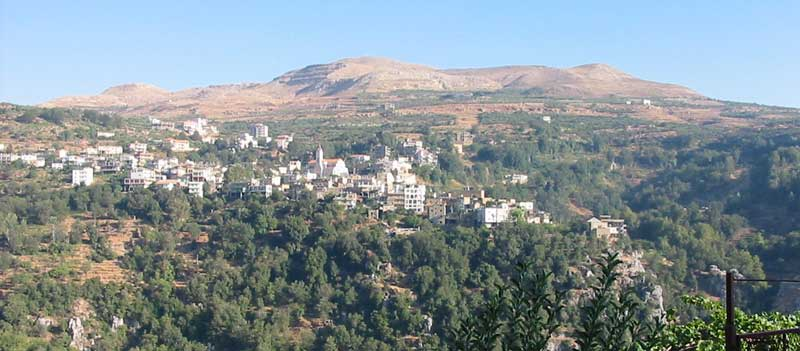
Kfarsghab

Kfarsghab in Zgharta District in the Mount Lebanon Governorate of Lebanon predates Christianity. As with most villages in the Qadisha valley, Kfarsghab's history began with the settlement of the Maronites in Mount Lebanon during the 7th century. According to local tradition, the church of Saint Awtel was built on the ruins of a pagan temple. The existence of pagan temples is attested to in a Greek inscription mentioning the date 272 AD found in the Mar Mama church in Ehden. The monastery of Mar Sarkis and Bakhos in Ehden may also have been built atop pagan ruins.

== Around 1000 AD ==
A possible reference to Kfarsghab appears in a letter found in the Cairo Geniza dating between 1011 and 1037 AD.

== Mamluk period – 1252–1517 ==
Maronite historians mention Kfarsghab in connection with events of 1283 at the end of the crusading period. It is related to the invasion of Jebbet Bsharri by the Mamluk army and the collaboration of Ibn Al Sabha ابن الصبحا from Kfarsghab with the Mamluks. El Douaihy (1630–1704) wrote in Tarikh Al-Azminah about the role of Ibn Al Sabha during this invasion:

And it was related that the fort that was in Hawqa could not be taken by the Army, which was then advised by Ibn Al Şabĥa from Kfarşghab to divert the water source of Bcherray and direct it against the fort. They thus took it (the fort of Hawqa) by the force of water and brought it to the ground. For that reason, they (the armies) authorized Ibn Al Şabĥa to dress in white Bash Yanis (White clothes reserved to the only Muslims) and the rest of the slaves served him (Ibn Al Şabĥa) and he was very powerful with them. Then, he (Ibn Al Şabĥa) repented of his bad actions and returned and constructed the Monastery of Hawqa close to the fort for the housing of the monks. And the waterway [used to destroy the fort] became reserved since those times and till our days for the usage of the Monasteries in turns, thus on Sundays, Mondays and Tuesdays for the Monastery of Qannubine, on Wednesdays for the Monastery of Hawqa Blawza, and on the rest of the days (of the week) for the town of Hadshit and its Waqfs.

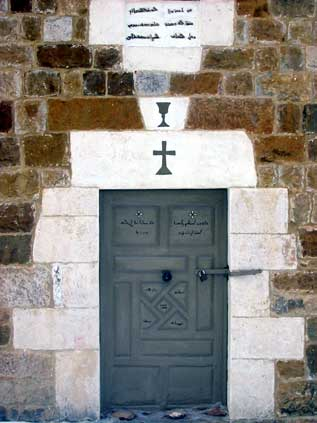
The main entrance of Mar Awtel church built on the ruins of a pagan temple

This 'betrayal' can be understood in a historic context. At the beginning of the 13th century, three main powers existed more or less peacefully in the Middle East: the Byzantines, the Franks, and the Ayyubid Sultans in Cairo, Egypt. Each power had its allies in the region. The failure of the Seventh Crusade and the defeat of the Mongols heralded the rise of a new power, the Mamluks of Egypt, from 1250 AD. Seeking legitimacy in the Muslim world, Baibars attacked the Franks, seizing Antioch in 1268. From that date, the pre-existing divisions of the native Christians of Lebanon between Pro and Anti-Franks became more marked. The anti-Frankish party found in the Mamluks the strong ally it was missing since the First Crusade in 1099. After a first limited Mamluk incursion in Jebbet Bsharri against the village of Hadath in 1268, the Mamluk armies came back to the region in 1283 and also returned in 1290 after the fall of the Frankish city of Tripoli in 1289. These campaigns were directed against the allies of the Franks in Jebbet Bsharri according El Douaihy. Their success reinforced the position of the anti-Frankish party to which Ibn Al Sabha belonged.

During the Mamluk period in Lebanon (1290–1517), few mentions of the village are found.

In 1470 Kfarsghab is mentioned in conjunction with the construction of Saint Awtel's Church. It is the only church in Lebanon dedicated to this Saint whose tradition is shared by the Maronite, Orthodox and Jacobite churches.

The village is mentioned indirectly at the end of the conflict between the Jacobites and Maronites. Profiting from the troubles in Jebbet Bsharri (or maybe called upon for help by the Jacobites), the Muslim Muqaddams of the neighbouring region of Ďanniyeh attacked Ehden in 1489 hoping for a quick victory. The inhabitants of Ehden and of the neighbouring villages, including Kfarşghab, despairing of the help of the Muqaddam of Bsharri, ‘Abdel Mon‘em, pushed back the attackers.

== Ottoman period – 1517–1918 ==
Following the conquest of Constantinople in 1453, the Ottoman Empire entered a long period of conquest and expansion. By defeating the Mamluks in 1517, it achieved control over the Middle East. Jebbet Bsharri entered 4 long centuries under the Ottoman rule.

=== 16th century ===
The first Ottoman Census of 1519 found 14 Christian males over the age of15, all married. Historians estimated the total population by using an average of 6.6 inhabitants per adult male, which gave about 92 inhabitants. The tax money amounted to 1,600 Akçes and its payment reserved to the Waqf of the heirs of Saad Al Moulouk.

The second census of 1571 recorded 12 males in Kfarsghab. The tax amounted to 2,892 Akçes paid to the Waqf of the Two Holy Mosques. There was an amount of 1,068 Akçes paid as Jizya.

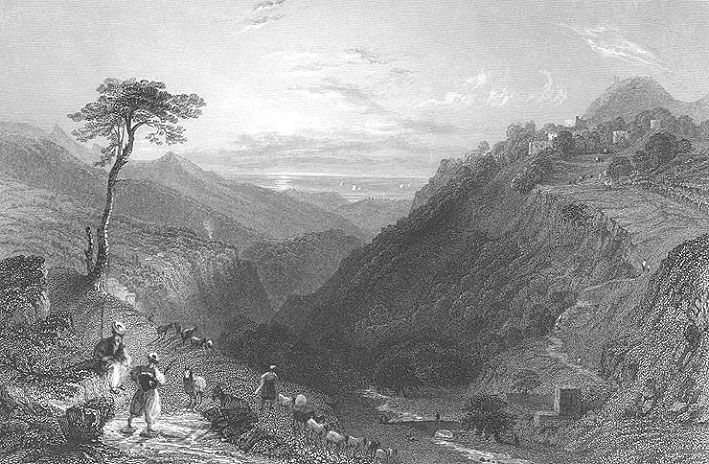
Engraving by WH Bartlett of Kfarsghab and Ehden in 1838

In spite of the tax increases due to inflation, the population of Kfarsghab decreased between 1519 and 1571. This decrease is attributed to the economic difficulties of the 16th century in the Middle East, but also to the struggle between Maronites and Jacobites. Kfarsghab stands in the middle of four historical centers of Jacobites in the region: Bqoufa, Bane, Hadshit and Bsharri. However, the Jacobites were driven out around 1550. Both censuses show that Kfarsghab was inhabited by Christians but without distinction between Jacobites and Maronites.

Around 1600, the Kfarsghab population merged with that of the neighboring village of Qaryat Moussa due to religious disputes. The inhabitants of Qaryat Moussa had been suspected of being Jacobites since the end of the 14th century. The struggle between Maronites and Jacobites in the region lasted until the mid-16th century. The Jacobite population dwindled over time possibly due to economic hardship and the harshness of the climate. According to local tradition, Qaryat Moussa was abandoned due to the displacement of the village water source in the wake of seismic activity from the middle of the sixteenth century till the middle of the eighteenth century.

Historical references of Qaryat Moussa persist till the end of the 16th century, after which the village disappears from the historical records. The Ottoman census found 9 males in 1519, all Christians and only 7 of them married. The second census, in 1571, recorded 12 males.

Another reference concerns a Maronite synod that took place in 1598 in Saint Moura, the church of Qaryat Moussa. The priest at the time of the 1598 synod, Ibrahim of Qaryat Moussa, was an important aide of the then Patriarch Youssef AlRizzi (1596–1608). AinTourini mentions another synod in this church in 1644.

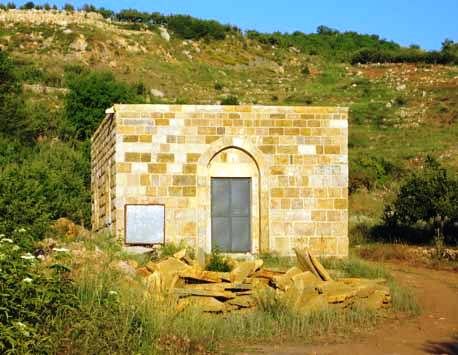
Saint Augustine Church in Kfarsghab undergoing renovation

Another point of view on the merger and the location of the synod comes from Father Youakim Moubarac when introducing his translation into French of the canons of the Synod:

We put into this translation a particular care because Day`at Moussa overlooks by some hundred meters the village where we were born. However, we cannot help to have some doubt as to the precise location of this Synod. Mart Moura's church, the generally assumed location for that synod celebration, is well known and its patronal saint's day is still celebrated every year with the fervent participation of the faithful from our village Kfarsghab, on September 24. Also, we think that there lies our village of origin, before unknown reasons to the local memory made us go down.

But my family acquired in the time of my father a plot of land upper than Mart Moura. It is called Marg el-Dayr and it belonged to the family Mousa. Its conversion into an orchard caused the cleaning of an oratory in decline devoted to Saint Augustine. Would it be rather there the place of celebration of the synod? I prefer to believe it because the place in question is on the border of the famous village of Bqoufa, also ruined, but from which we know that the prelates of the family Rizzi are originated, prelates who led our Church in those times with three successive patriarchs.

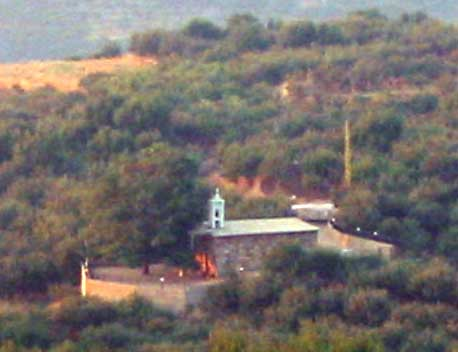
Mart Moura Church, Kfarsghab

As of 2013 Mart Saint Moura Church belongs to Kfarsghab. Restored in the 1990s, it is used once a year on Mart Moura's Day (24 September). On that day all the villagers in Kfarsghab participate in celebrating a mass, praying especially for the rest of the souls of the forebears of Kfarsghab buried in the cemetery located next to the church.

The modern Kfarsghab results from a merge between Kfarsghab and Qaryat Moussa around 1600.

=== The 17th century ===
At the end of the 16th century, the emergence of a first autonomous Lebanese Emirate in the southern Mount Lebanon had important impacts in Jebbet Bsharri. In political terms, it ended in 1621 the role of the Muqaddams of Bsharri as the traditional lords of the region being the official representatives of the Ottoman Governor of Tripoli. In economical terms, the southern Mount Lebanon under the stable rule of the Emir Fakhreddine attracted many families who were encouraged by the Emir to establish there. An important migration took place from Jebbet Bsharri to the south but also to Aleppo, Syria.

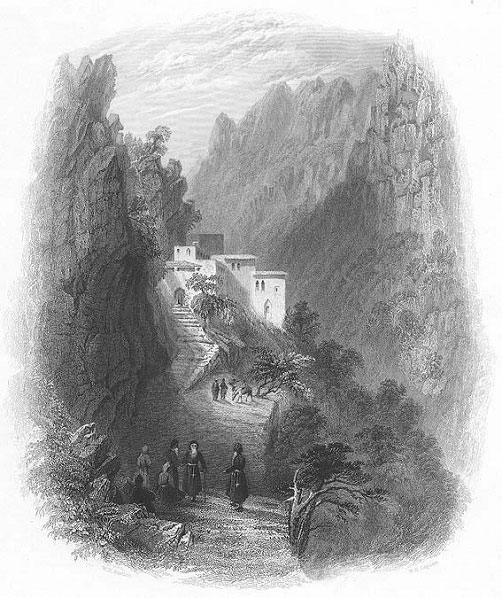
Monastery of Qozhaya with Kfarsghab in background, engraving by Bartlett in 1838

The bloody end of the autonomous Emirate in 1635 left Jebbet Bsharri in political confusion. The government was assigned by the Ottomans to two local village sheikhs as joint governors of Jebbet Bsharri: the Sheikh Abi Karam Yaaqoub from Hadath (1635–1640) and the Sheikh Abi Gebrayel Youssef Karam from Ehden (1635–1641). The period that opened up when those two sheikhs disappeared was full of exactions and violence. Given the instability, the people of Jebbet Bsharri insisted in 1654, on the Governor of Tripoli to appoint as governor of their region, Sheikh Ahmad Hamadeh, a member of the powerful Shiite Hamadeh family, rulers of the Byblos District and Batroun District regions. The Hamadeh did not succeed in establishing stability before the end of the century as they were continuously challenged by the local sheikhs and by members of their own clan.

For Kfarsghab, an important event of this century will take place in 1695 when the Lebanese Maronite Order was founded by three young Maronites from Aleppo, Syria. The Patriarch Estephan El Douaihy encouraged the founders and established them in the Monastery of Mart Moura in Ehden. As the Order grew quickly, they established in Mar Lishaa, Bsharri (1696) and in Qozhaya (1708). In the coming two centuries, the Order will represent a major attraction for the young people of Kfarsghab who will join massively its ranks.

Among the first members of the new Order was Abdallah Habqouq from Kfarsghab. He joined the Lebanese Maronite Order very early in the pioneering days and became administrator (Mudabbir) of the Order in 1698. The family of Father Abdallah Habqouq established in the region in the second part of the 17th century and acquired the monastery of Qozhaya from the Gilwan family, owners of Qozhaya since 1567. The Habqouq family, and specifically Bishop Youhanna Habqouq, surrendered Qozhaya to the Lebanese Maronite Order in 1708.

=== The 18th century ===
In the beginning of the 18th century, the Jebbet Bsharri region was in a very poor state following the conflicts that had taken place in the past 70 years. Many villages were depopulated, land was abandoned. After 1677 the Hamadeh encouraged people from their fiefdoms of Byblos District and Batroun District to migrate to Jebbet Bsharri in order to populate the area, as requested of them by the Governor of Tripoli. But only in 1704 did the Hamadeh succeed in securing their rule of Jebbet Bsharri and in showing some results in their repopulation efforts, especially as the situation in the south Mount Lebanon was plagued by the Qaissites / Yamanites conflict and then by the succession conflicts triggered by the fall of the house of Maans in 1697. For Kfarsghab, it is supposed that the main four families that compose the today's Kfarsghab came to the region from 1677 to 1704.

==== The foundation of the modern Kfarsghab (1704–1761) ====
===== The Abou Mansour family =====
It is between 1677 and 1704 that the family Abou Mansour Al Bahri arrived in Jebbet Bsharri from the coast of the Batroun District. They established themselves in Kfarsghab merging slowly with the few surviving natives, possibly from the Saliba family as recorded by the tradition.

The newcomers helped the Hamadeh in the administration of the region as it is shown in the records of the Court of Tripoli.

Those records show that,

- in 1737 the Sheikh of Kfarsghab, Mansour son of Hanna, vouched for the settlement of the Kfarsghab taxes by the Sheikh Hussein bin Moussa Hamadeh,
- in 1748, the Sheikh of Kfarsghab, Hanna Abou Mansour, did the same for the Sheikh Assaad bin Moussa Hamadeh,
- in 1752, the records of the Court show that Sheikh Hanna Son of Mansour from Kfarsghab was guarantor of Assaad Hamadeh.

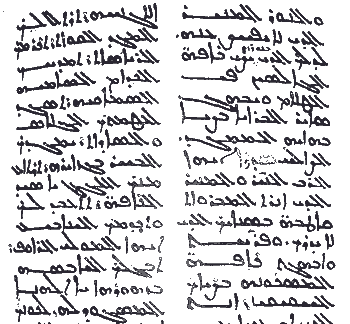
Copy of Reesh Qoryan with the Help of Sheikh Hanna son of Father Youssef Al Bahri, ca. 1754

Another reference to Sheikh Hanna is found on a religious book copy stating that Deacon Hanna son of Father Youssef Al Bahri finished copying the Reesh Qoryan with Fr Ibrahim Jilwan AlSamrani on July 3, 1754. Most of the sheikhs of that time were ordained deacons allowing them to have religious as well as political power.

===== The Abou Youssef family =====
The Abou Youssef Elias family came to the Jebbet Bsharri region in the beginning of the 17th century from Smar Jbeil, the village of the Gilwan family, ex-owners of the Monastery of Qozhaya. In another documented version, This family could have come originally from Benta'el in the Byblos region. This family was encouraged to settle in the region by the Gilwan's and maybe the Hamadeh sheikhs. They settled first in Tourza and Arbet Qozhaya, working as sharecroppers of the Monastery of Qozhaya. After Qozhaya was handed down to the Lebanese Maronite Order in 1708, they moved to Kfarsghab between 1710 and 1720.

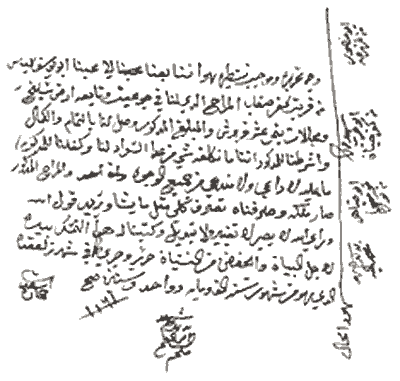
Morh Kfarsghab deed property dated 1748

In the tradition of the village of Kfarsghab, Abou Youssef Elias married a daughter of the Abou Mansour Al Bahri family :

The first inhabitant ever recorded was Deeb El Bahri. Deeb came from the coast of Batroun and established himself in the district. He married Maureena El Saliba and had three Sons that are the origins of the three families - Abou Mansour, Khoury Youssef and Abou Abraham. The family of Abou Youssef was a descendant of Elias who came to Kfarsghab from the Coast and married a granddaughter of Deeb El Bahri …

In 1748, Abou Youssef Elias from Kfarsghab bought from Sheikh Assaad Hamadeh the land that will become later the village of Morh Kfarsghab. In the property deed established between the two men, Assaad Hamadeh referred to Abou Youssef Elias as our beloved and not with the title Sheikh. This personal reference could imply that Abou Youssef Elias was close to Assaad Hamadeh.

In 1755, the guarantor of Assaad Hamadeh at the Court of Tripoli was the Sheikh Elias Abou Youssef son of Bahri or Al Bahri. In spite of the name Al Bahri added to the name of this last sheikh, this sheikh is Abou Youssef Elias, married to a daughter of Al Bahri family. It seems that, between 1748 and 1755, Abou Youssef Elias became powerful enough to claim the sheikhdom of Kfarsghab and take it from his relatives by his wife, the Abou Mansour Al Bahri.

The Sheikh and his descendants will play an important role in the history of Kfarsghab and of Jebbet Bsharri.

===== The Habqouq family =====
This family arrived in Kfarsghab in the beginning of the 18th century. Like the Abou Youssef Elias family, the Habqouq have bought the Monastery of Qozhaya from the Gilwan family in the second half of the 17th century. The family came from Bsheeleh in the Batroun region and before that from Bikfaya in Metn and Jeita in Keserwan District. The priests of the family settled in the Monastery of Qozhaya and their families in Arbet Qozhaya and in Bane. It is this family that gave Qozhaya to the Lebanese Maronite Order in 1708. It is probably after this event that part of the family moved from Arbet Qozhaya to Kfarsghab, the other part stayed in Bane.

This family gave the Maronite Church several illustrious sons, like Abdallah Habqouq (1670–1758). Abdallah Habqouq from Kfarsghab joined the Lebanese Maronite Order very early in the pioneering days. He was administrator (Mudabbir) of the Order between 1698 and 1732 and then between 1738 and 1742. From 1729 to 1735 and then from 1742 to 1743, he was superior of the Monastery of Our Lady of Tamish, an important Monastery that became in 1744 the siege of the Baladites Order (after the split of the Order into two Orders: Baladites and Halabites).

Father Abdallah was consecrated Bishop on 20 May 1742 by the Bishop Tubiya Al Khazin ( future Patriarch 1756–1766). This consecration was done in a context of conflict over the succession of Patriarch Yusuf Dargham Al Khazin between Tubiya Al Khazin and Ilyas Muhasib. This conflict was eventually settled by the Vatican by the election of Simaan Awwad and the confirmation of the consecration of Bishop Abdallah Habqouq. Bishop Abdallah is mentioned as a signatory of a legal document in his capacity of bishop in 1744, next to the name of the Patriarch Simaan Awwad.

Apparently Bishop Abdallah sided with the Halabites faction of the Order as no records for his death are found in the Baladites faction archives.

Bishop Abdallah died on 7 August 1758 in Kfarsghab and is buried in Saint Awtel Church.

===== The Khouriyyeh family =====
Allied to the Abou Mansour family, the origin of this family could be traced to Aqoura, in the mountains of Byblos. Its date of arrival in Kfarsghab is difficult to estimate. But given the fact that a Sheikh Hanna son of Rizk (from the Khourriyeh family) is cited in the records of the Court of Tripoli for the year 1761, this family had been settled in Kfarsghab for some time, most probably in the first part of the 18th century.

==== The bourgeois Sheikhs rise (1761–1772) ====
The major event of the eighteenth century for Jebbet Bsharri happened in 1761 when Abou Youssef Elias from Kfarsghab, along with Hanna Al Daher from Bsharri, Gerges Boulos El Douaihy from Ehden and Abou Sleimane Aouad from Hasroun, took all together the direct collection of the taxes of Jebbet Bsharri from the Governor of Tripoli, Osman Pacha the Georgian. They were helped by some of the traditional Sheikhs who guaranteed at the Court of Tripoli the payment of the taxes. It was the first serious defeat of the Hamadeh in this century and the rise of a new generation of local Maronite Sheikhs, called here Bourgeois Sheikhs.

But the Hamadeh counter-attacked, helped most probably by local people from Bsharri and Hasroun. In their struggle against the Hamadeh that lasted from 1760 till 1772, the bourgeois Sheikhs of Jebbet Bsharri got the support of the Governors of Tripoli, Osman Pasha and his son Mohammad Pasha, of the Sunnite Sheikhs of Danniyeh and of the Sheikhs of Zawiyeh. In 1763, the ambitious Emir Youssef Al Shihabi (ruled afterwards Mount Lebanon from 1770 to 1789) installed in the Byblos region and being himself in conflict with the Hamadeh, profited from the difficulties of the Bourgeois Sheikhs and maneuvered to take from them the collection of taxes in Jebbet Bsharri. He contracted an alliance with the Bourgeois Sheikhs and confirmed their privileges in the tax collection of their districts as well as their right to claim the abandoned properties of the Hamadeh (Baklik). The fight with the Hamadeh will continue for 12 years. It will lead to their eviction from the whole region and to their final defeat in 1772. The Emir Youssef Al Shihabi, and his Shihabis successors, will have the direct rule of Jebbet Bsharri for almost one century from 1763 till 1844, helped by the new generation of Bourgeois Village Sheiks of Jebbet Bsharri: El Douaihy, Estephane, Awwad and Daher, but also Khattar and Issa Al Khoury.

In 1761, the guarantor of Abou Youssef Elias was a certain Sheikh Hanna son of Rizk from Kfarsghab. This family appeared as sheikhs of Kfarsghab for the first time. Apparently, Abou Youssef Elias was representing by marriage the Abou Mansour family as witnessed by the last name Al Bahri added to his own name in the records of the Court. In taking a guarantor from the Rizk family, he ensured the loyalty and support of other families of Kfarsghab.

==== The development of Kfarsghab (1772–1799) ====
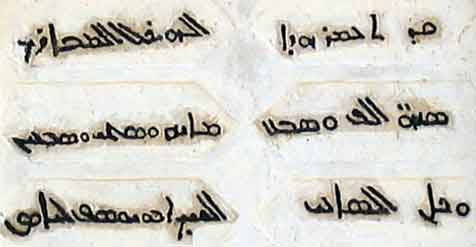
The inscription on the main entrance of Mar Awtel church commemorating the extension of 1776

The last part of this century saw the economic development of Kfarsghab. Sheikh Abou Youssef Elias will deploy an important energy, till his death on December 12, 1785. The foundation in 1748 and then extension of Morh Kfarsghab on the Baklik land of the Hamadeh was necessary for the silkworm industrial development, especially during wintertime, as the European demand for Lebanese silk was important in that century. Also the extension of Mar Awtel church in 1776 must have been necessary to accommodate the increasing population.

From 1755, the Sheikhs of Kfarsghab will be from the Abou Youssef Elias family, and specifically from the Estephane branch of the family. This family ran the administration of the villages of Kfarsghab, Toula, half of Karmsaddeh and half of Raskifa. For those two last villages, they shared the administration with another Bourgeois Sheikhs family, the Aouad from Hasroun. In fact, the Estephane family ruled exactly the same domain (Oktaa) as Sheikh Assaad Hamadeh, who ruled Kfarsghab in the previous period.

This century would have witnessed the beginning of an important movement for Kfarsghab that will be at its apogee in the following century; that is to say the massive monastic vows among the natives of Kfarsghab. During the 18th century, more than 12 young men joined the ranks of the Lebanese Maronite Order. The demographic weakness of Kfarsghab in the first half of the century, the purchase of the winter village of Morh Kfarsghab and its development starting in 1748 and possibly the conflict inside the Order that started in 1748 between the Aleppine monks and the Lebanese ones and that eventually led to the splitting of the order into two in 1768, could be behind this modest number of monks from Kfarsghab. It will have a major impact on Kfarsghab.

=== The 19th century ===
The 19th century was a much contrasted century for Lebanon. It witnessed the evolution from a traditional peasant society tightly governed by the Sheikhs to a more modern dynamic society opened to the outside world.

==== The monastic orders (1840–1870) ====
The first major evolution for Kfarsghab was the massive attraction of the monastic orders especially that of the Lebanese Maronite Order solidly installed in the neighbouring Monastery of Qozhaya. The first half of the nineteenth century witnessed a doubling in the vocations from Kfarsghab. Between 1800 and 1850, the Order received 8 to 10 monks from Kfarsghab. Between 1850 and 1875, things changed dramatically. In this period, more than 23 monks from Kfarsghab took their vows.

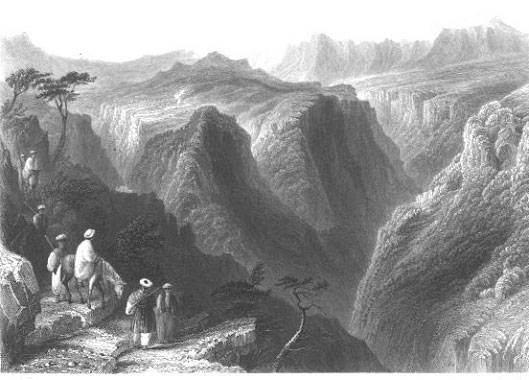
Kfarsghab in the perspective of the Qadisha valley, engraving by Bartlett in 1838

It is explained by a surge in the number of births in Kfarsghab in the 1830s due to the improvement of the economic conditions favoured by the development of silk. In 1829, there were 125 houses in Kfarsghab. Considering the average size of a household to be of 10, then the number of inhabitants of Kfarsghab was of 1250. The census of 1849 made state of 374 males, that is to say roughly a total of 1,870 people (number of males multiplied by 5).

The baby-boomers of the 1830–1840s started joining massively the Monk Orders. One major factor was the decline in the revenues derived from silk in Jebbet Bsharri region that started around 1845. In 1844–1845, silk revenues were covering 72% of the economic needs decreasing to 25% in 1851–1852 and further to 15% in 1857. Along with an increased centralization of the administration under the new regime of Qaym-maqiyamatayn (1842–1860), it contributed to the weakening of the political and economical powers of the sheikhs in the region in general leaving no economic perspectives to the young people. Also, the opening of a school in the neighbouring village of Bane in 1806 by the Lebanese Maronite Order for the basic instruction of the children of Kfarsghab and Bane served as a channel of detection and recruitment of talents and workforce for the Order. The effect was a reduction in the Kfarsghab population. According to a recent study, 344 males lived in Kfarsghab in 1862, that is to say 1,720 inhabitants.

==== The emigration (1870–1899) ====
In the 1870s, vocations among the natives of Kfarsghab started to decrease. Between 1875 and 1900, only 3 vocations were recorded for Kfarsghab. Vocations from Kfarsghab ceased on 17 December 1898 when Br Ephraim Saliba Abboud II joined. Brother Ephraim died on 9 April 1947. Overall, the Lebanese Maronite Order attracted 43 young people from Kfarsghab, making this village the 15th most important contributor to the Order, among the 382 villages that counted monks among their sons. Still in 1900, Kfarsghab counted 13 monks among its sons, representing 4% of the adult male population compared to 0.8% for the average of the region of Jebbet Bsharri.

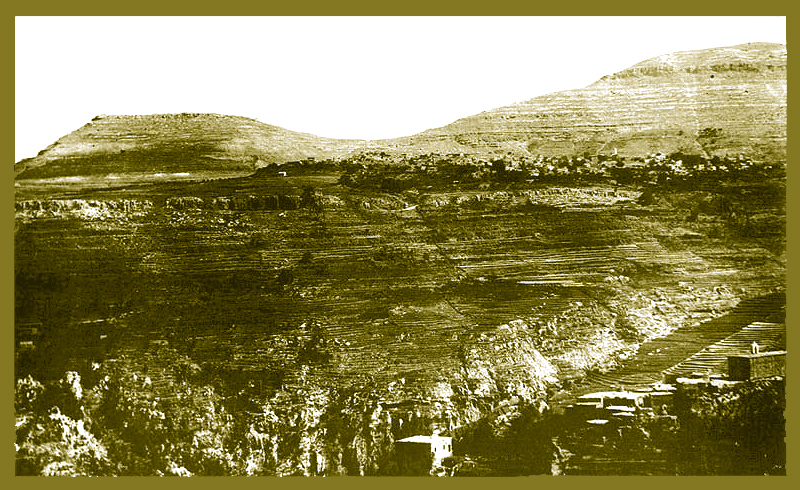
Ehden & Kfarsghab seen from Bane in 1896

Looking at the names and the monasteries of the monks from Kfarsghab, 75% of them were assigned to monasteries located in North Lebanon, most of them being in Qozhaya. The objective of the reform that took place after the revolt of Qozhaya in 1875 was to assign the monks in a different region from their region of origin. 4 monks of Kfarsghab participated in the 1875 revolt, one of them, brother Boutros, being among its leaders. As a result, the power of Qozhaya was broken, its lands divided between several monasteries and its monks (around 200 at its height) distributed in different Monasteries. It is possible, according to some historians, that this reform could have had a negative impact on the vocations from Jebbet Bsharri.

The special status of Mount Lebanon during the Regime of Mutasarrifiah (1861–1914) changed the administration of Kfarsghab which was attached to the distant district of Batroun. The collapse of the prices of silk from the 1870s and onward deteriorated the economic situation. Politically and economically, the Sheikhs of Kfarsghab were weakened. Finally, the loss of interest in the monks order was replaced soon by the emigration to the US and to Australia.

Emigration from Kfarsghab to the United States started in 1885, followed by an emigration to Australia in 1887. It resulted in a dramatic decrease in the Kfarsghab population. In 1889, the number of inhabitants was estimated to 1,100. For the year 1900, it is reported 330 male adults, 950 inhabitants and 150 emigrants for Kfarsghab. Kfarsghab lost to the emigration 20% of its population in less than 15 years. This trend will continue in the 20th century.
