= Mar Sarkis, Ehden =

Coordinates: 34.2900°N 35.9822°E

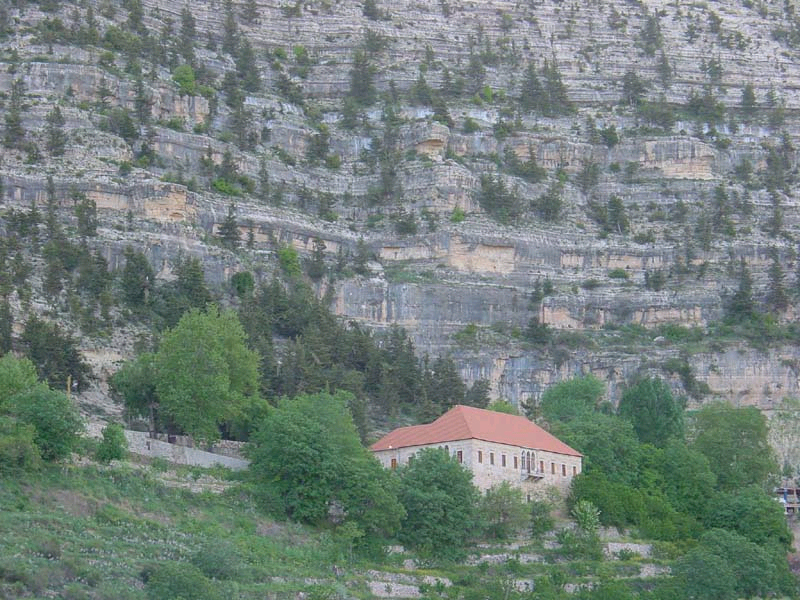
Monastery of Saints Sarkis & Bakhos

In Ehden, Lebanon, Mar Sarkis is a monastery of the Antonins. It is located in the Zgharta District of the North Governorate, in the Qozhaya valley. It overlooks Ehden, Kfarsghab, Bane and Hadath El Jebbeh. Given its exceptional location commanding the valley at 1,500 meters altitude, the monastery is called the Watchful Eye of Qadisha.

It is dedicated to Saints Sergius and Bacchus (Sarkis and Bakhos). The name Ras Al Nahr means 'the top of the river', as it is in the vicinity of the Mar Sarkis Source, the main contributor to the river Qlaynsieh which, after joining the Qannoubine river, will form near Tripoli the river Abou Ali.

== History ==
The first church of Saints Sarkis and Bakhos was built in the mid 8th Century A.D. on the ruins of a Canaanite temple dedicated to a divinity of agriculture. Next to it, another church dedicated to Our Lady was constructed in 1198 A.D. Several buildings were added from 1404 till 1690, when Patriarch Estephan El Douaihy restored part of the buildings.

It is interesting to know that:

- the Monastery was the Episcopal See of Ehden from 1473 till 1739,
- the French hermit François de Chasteuil lived in this monastery before moving in 1643 to the Monastery Mar Elisha Bsharri,
- Patriarch Estephan El Douaihy (1670–1704) was ordained priest in this Monastery on March 25, 1656.

The Monastery belonged to the Douaihy family whose priests and Bishops resided in it and paid all its taxes and maintenance. On September 1, 1739, the Monastery was given to the Antonin Maronite Order who extended and improved its buildings and properties since then.

In 1854, the Antonin Maronite Order founded the Monastery of Mar Sarkis, Zgharta in order to allow the monks of Mar Sarkis to spend wintertimes away from the rigorous climate of the mountain. In 1938, the two monastic communities of Ehden and Zgharta were merged.

== See also ==
- Qadisha
- Mar Sarkis (disambiguation)
