= Aintourine =

Village in Zgharta District, Lebanon

Aintourine عينطورين
- City
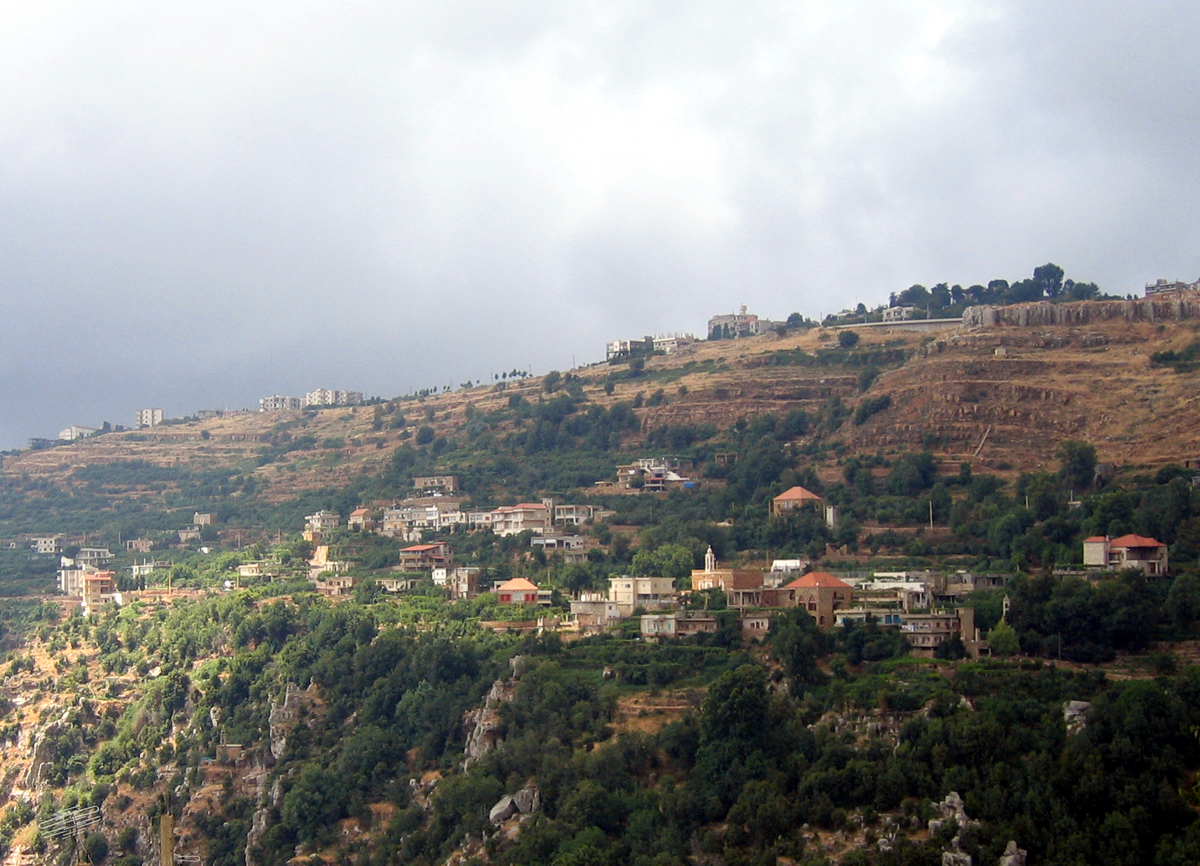
- Aintourine seen from Kfarsghab - July 2006

- Location within Lebanon
- Coordinates: 34°17′06″N 35°57′25″E
- Country: Lebanon
- Governorate: North Governorate
- District: Zgharta District
- Elevation: 1,280 m (4,200 ft)
- Time zone: UTC+2 (EET)
  - Summer (DST): UTC+3 (EEST)
- Dialing code: +961

Aintourine (Arabic: عينطورين, romanized: ʿAyn Ṭūrīn), known also as Ain Tourine, `Aynturin, `Intawrin or Amtourine, is a village located in the Zgharta District, in the North Governorate of Lebanon. It is situated in the valley of Qozhaya, the northern branch of the Valley of Qadisha. The population adheres to the Maronite Church.

== Demographics ==
In 2014, Christians made up 99.70% of registered voters in Aintourine. 97.57% of the voters were Maronite Catholics.
