= Kadisha Valley =

Valley in North Governate, Lebanon

Ouadi Qadisha
UNESCO World Heritage Site
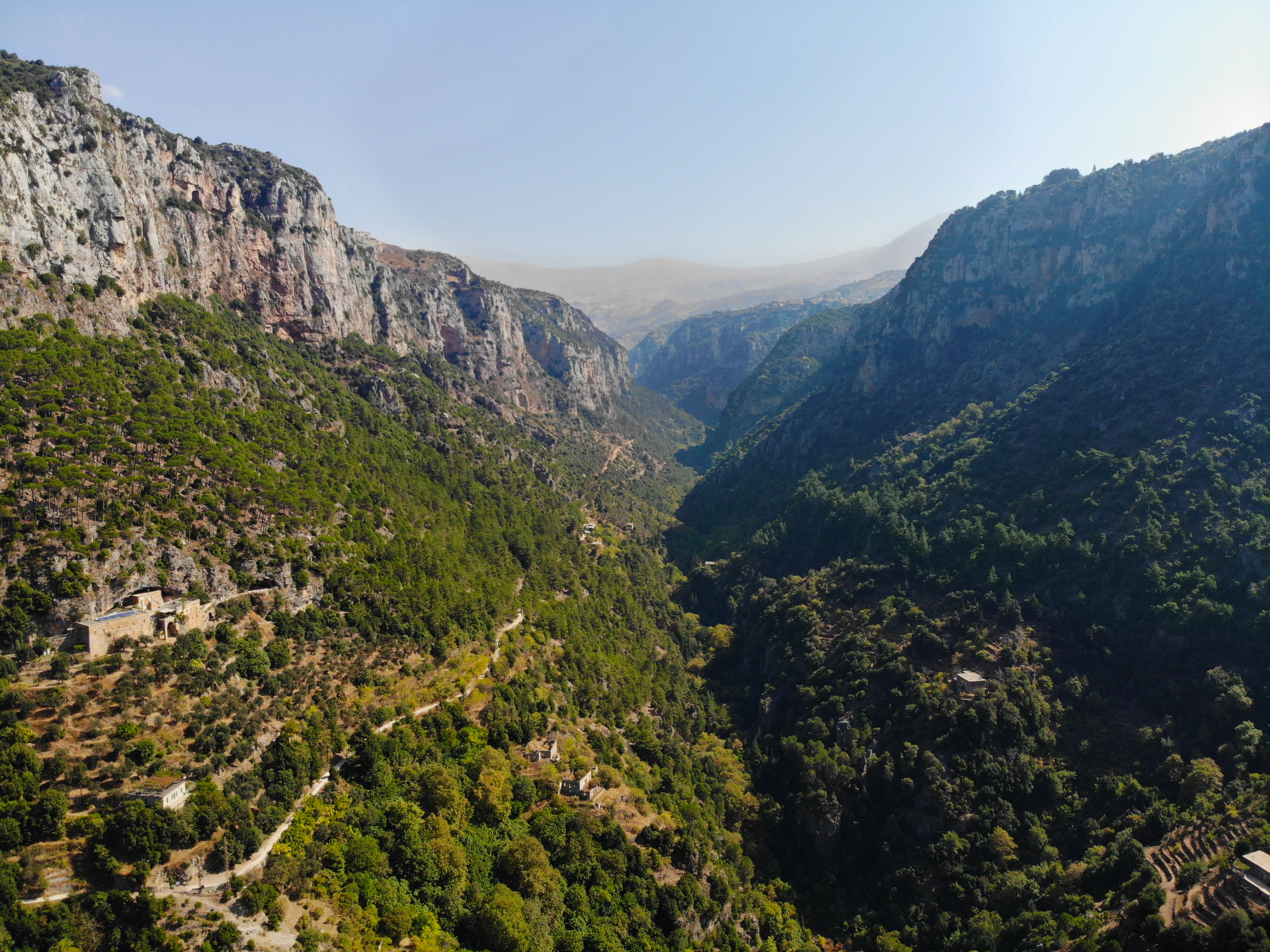

- Location within Lebanon Location within West and Central Asia
- Location: North Governorate, Lebanon
- Part of: Ouadi Qadisha (the Holy Valley) and the Forest of the Cedars of God (Horsh Arz el-Rab) Bsharri
- Criteria: Cultural: (iii)(iv)
- Reference: 850-001
- Inscription: 1998 (22nd Session)
- Coordinates: 34°15′N 35°57′E

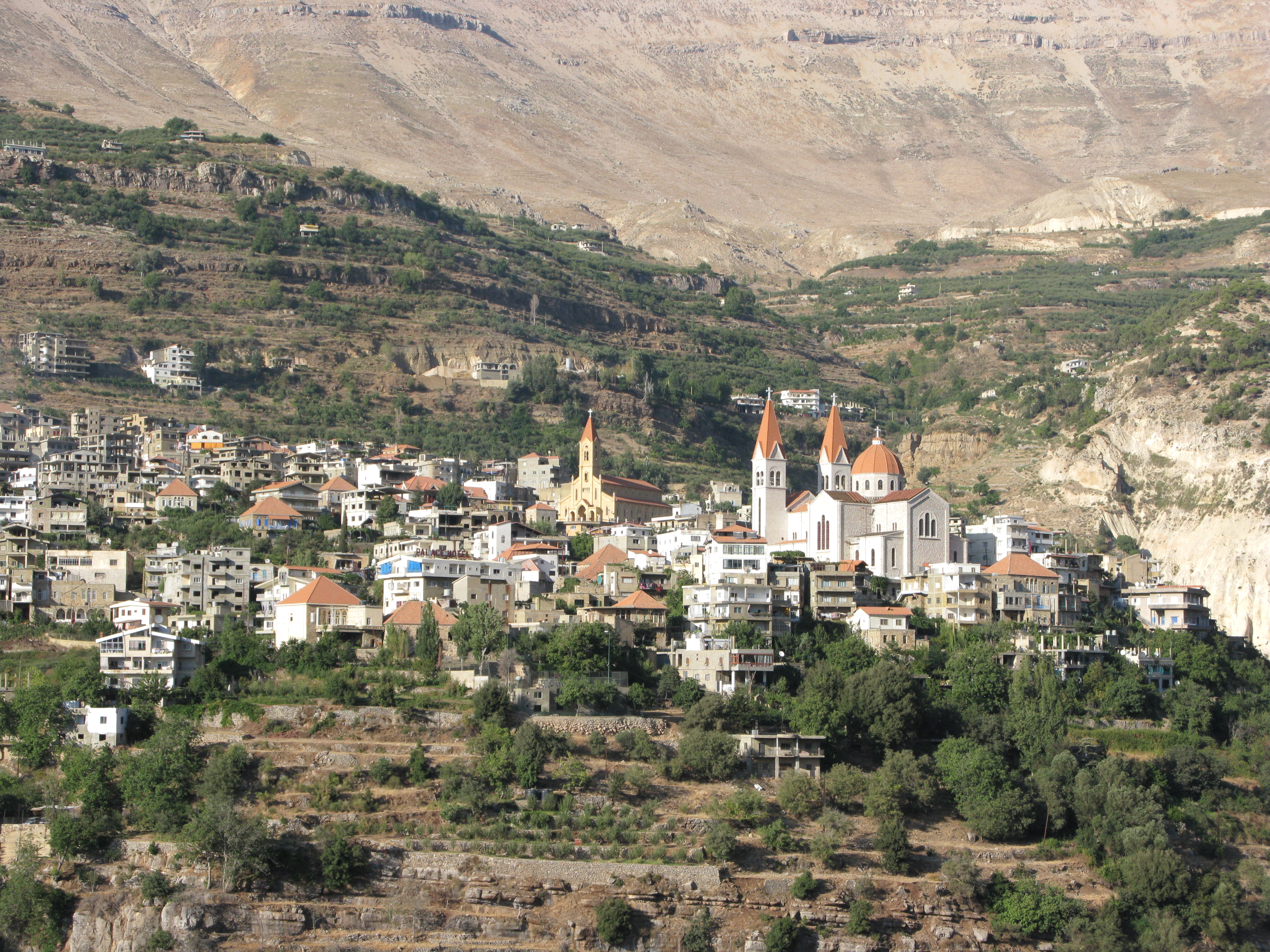
Bsharri

Kadisha Valley (Arabic: وادي قاديشا / وادي قديشا, romanized: Wādi Qadīšā / Wādi Qādīšā), also romanized as the Qadisha Valley and also known as the Kadisha Gorge or Wadi Kadisha (French: Ouadi Qadisha), is a gorge that lies within the Bsharri and Zgharta Districts of the North Governorate of Lebanon. The valley was carved by the Kadisha River, also known as the Nahr Abu Ali when it reaches Tripoli. Kadisha means "Holy" in Aramaic, and the valley is sometimes called the Holy Valley. It has sheltered Christian monastic communities for many centuries. The valley is located at the foot of Mount al-Makmal in northern Lebanon.

The valley is at risk due to the encroachment of human settlement, illegal building, and inconsistent conservation activity. Although it is not on the UNESCO "in danger" list, there have been warnings that continued violations may lead to this step.

== Geography ==
The holy river, Nahr Qadisha, runs through the valley for 35 km from its source in a cave (grotto) a little way below the Forest of the Cedars of God. The sides of the valley are steep cliffs that contain many caves, often at more than 1,000 m and all difficult of access. The most scenic section of the valley stretches for approximately 20 km between Bsharri (Arabic: بشري), the hometown of Kahlil Gibran, and Tourza (Arabic: طورزا).

=== Cedars of God ===
Kadisha Valley lies west of the Forest of the Cedars of God, (situated on the mountain above), survivors of the ancient Cedars of Lebanon, the most highly prized building materials of the ancient world. The forest is said to contain 375 individual trees, two claimed to be over 3,000 years old, ten over 1,000 years old, and the remainder at least centuries old. The Lebanon Cedar (Cedrus Libani) is described in ancient works on botany as the oldest tree in the world. It was admired by the Israelites, who brought it to their land to build the First and the Second temples in Jerusalem. Historical sources report that the cedar forests were beginning to disappear at the time of Justinian in the 6th century AD.

== History ==
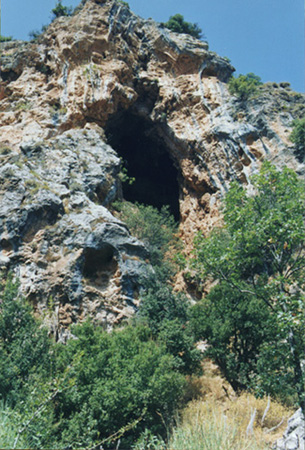
One of the caves in the Qadisha Valley.

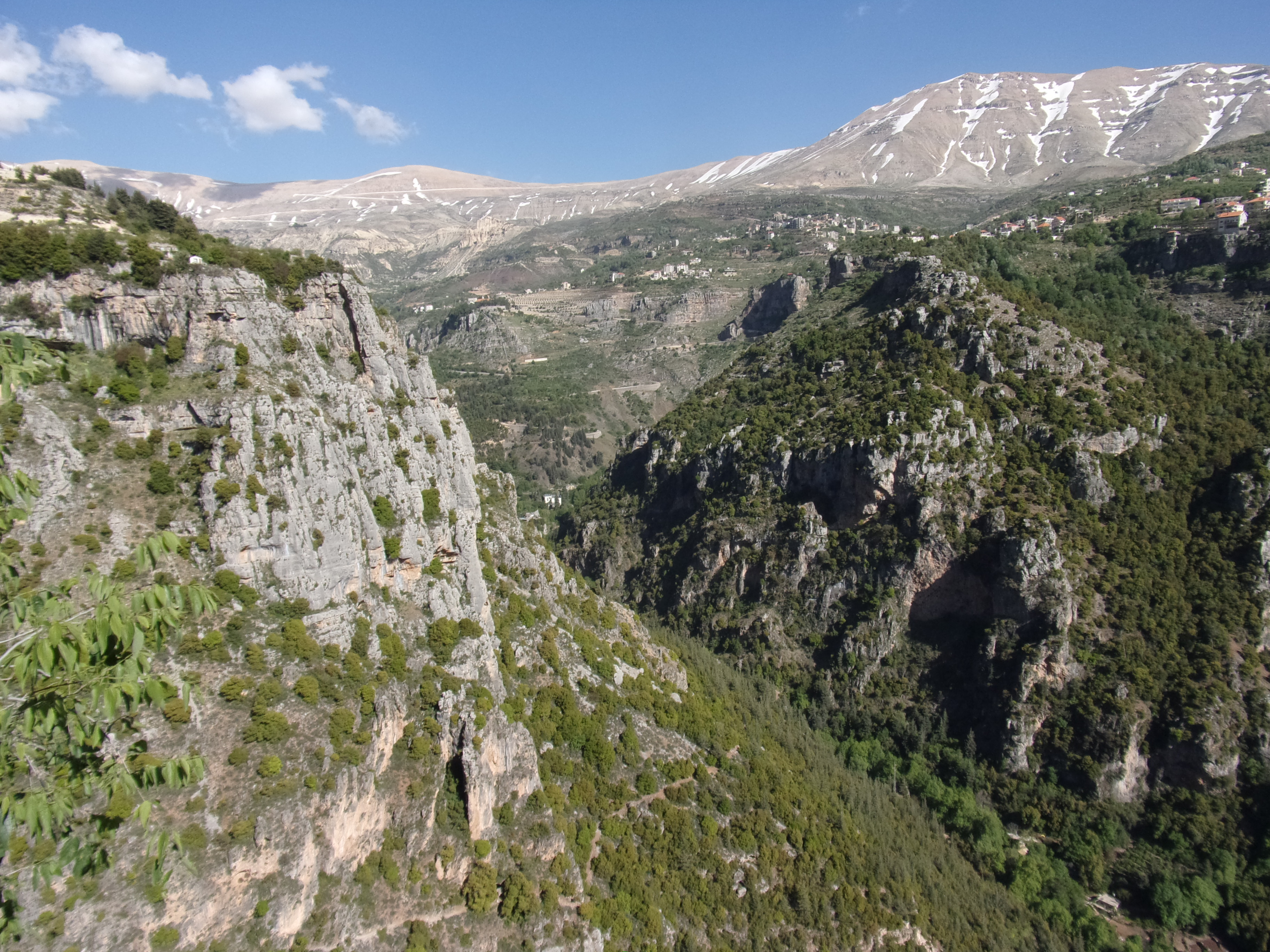
Kadisha Valley in 2024.

Qadisha Valley's natural caves have been used as shelters and for burials since the Palaeolithic period. The Aassi Hauqqa (cave) in particular, near Hawqa, has yielded archaeological items indicating use in the Palaeolithic, Roman, and medieval periods. Since the early days of Christianity the valley has served as a refuge for those in search of solitude. The Maronite monks established their new center at Qannubin, in the heart of the Qadisha, and monasteries quickly spread over the surrounding hills. Early Maronite settlement in the valley combined both community and eremitic life.

The Mameluk sultans Baibars and Qalaoun led campaigns in 1268 and 1283, respectively, against the fortress-caves, monasteries, and the surrounding villages. Despite these attacks, the Deir Qannubin monastery was to become the seat of the Maronite Patriarch in the 15th century and remained so for 500 years. In the 17th century, the Maronite monks’ reputation for piety was promoted through the Maronite school founded in Rome in 1584. by dint of this exposure, many European poets, historians, geographers, politicians, and clergy visited and even settled in the Valley. The first printing press in the Middle East was founded in 1585 at the Monastery of Qozhaya in the Kadisha Valley, and in 1610 printed its first book, the Book of Psalms in the Syriac language. It used Syriac characters. Also this printing press was the first to print in Arabic language

=== Qadisha mummies ===
Eight well preserved natural mummies of villagers dating back to around 1283 A.D. were uncovered by Fadi Baroudy, Pierre Abi Aoun, Paul Kahawaja & Antoine Ghaouch, a team of speleologists from the GERSL scientific organisation in the Qadisha Valley between 1989 and 1991. These were found in the 'Asi-al Hadath cave along with a wealth of artifacts.

=== World Heritage Site ===
In 1998, UNESCO added the valley to the list of World Heritage Sites because of its importance as the site of some of the earliest Christian monastic settlements in the world, and its continued example of Christian faith.

== Christian monasticism ==
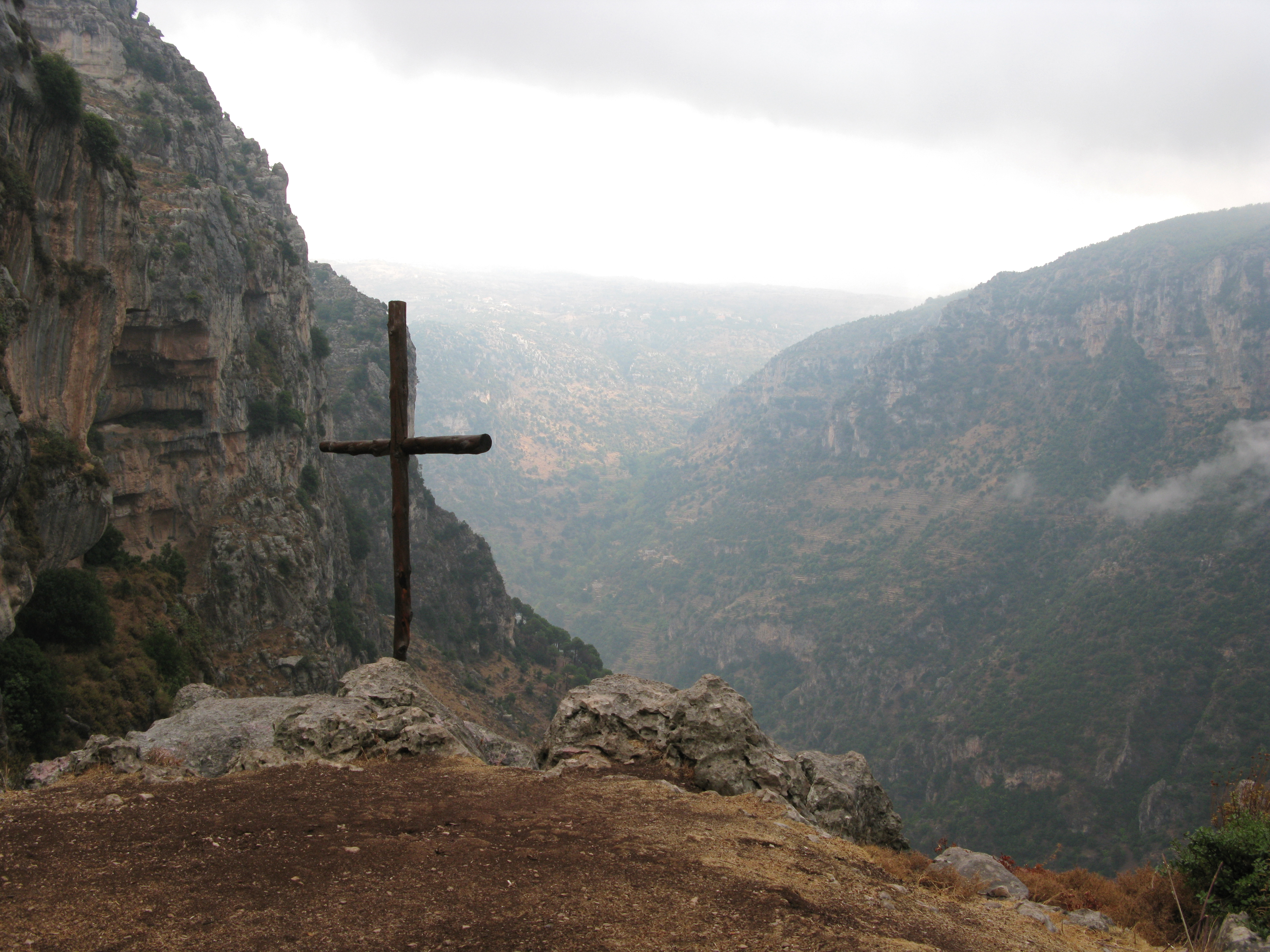
Cross near the Monastery of Qozhaya

The Kadisha (Holy) Valley is the site of some of the most ancient Christian monastic communities of the Middle East. The valley's natural caves, being comfortless, scattered, and difficult to access, provided monks and hermits sufficiently isolated and inhospitable conditions to live out Christian solitude, contemplation, and devotion. Many of the caves and irregularities in the cliff-sides were adapted to serve as individual dwellings (cells), chapels, and monasteries, and such buildings were further carved out of the cliff faces of the valley. Some have interiors covered with frescoes and facades. Around the caves there are terraced fields made by the hermits for growing grain, grapes, and olives.

While there are numerous monasteries in the valley, there are several main monastic complexes:

=== Qannubin Monastery ===
The Qannubin Monastery (Deir Qannubin (دير قنوبين)), is on the northeast side of the Qadisha Valley. Although its foundation is often attributed to the Emperor Theodosius the Great in 375AD, it is more likely that it was established by a disciple of St Theodosius the Cenobite. For the most part it is cut into the rock cliff side - monastic cells, church, cloister, and accommodation for travelers.

Since the fifteenth century, Qannubin started to be the See of the Maronite Patriarch.

=== Monastery of St Anthony of Qozhaya ===
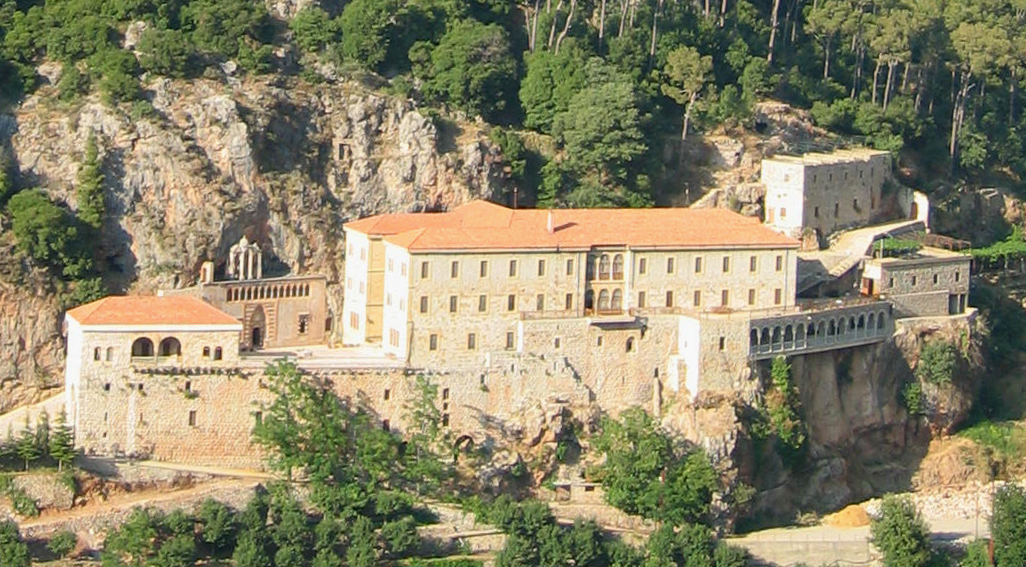
Monastery of Qozhaya - July 2003

The Monastery of Qozhaya (Deir Mar Antonios Qozhaya (دير مارانطﻮنيوﺱ ﻗﺰحيا)) sits on the opposite flank of the Qadisha from Qannubin Monastery. Tradition has its foundation in the 4th century by St Hilarion, in honour of the Egyptian anchorite, St Anthony the Great, though the earliest documentary records date back only to around 1000 AD. It was destroyed in the 16th century but quickly restored. It comprises a corridor, meeting room, and chapel, with a mill and a number of hermitages cut into the rock nearby.

The monastery is also home to the first printing press of the Middle East that was invented in 1610. The book printed was a bilingual Psalter in a small folio of 260 pages. The psalms are arranged in two columns, on the right is the text in Syriac and on the left in Arabic, but written in Syriac letters, which is known as Garshuni.

=== Monastery of Our Lady of Hawqa ===
Saydet Hawqa is situated at an altitude of 1150m between Qannubin and Qozhaya Monasteries, at the base of an enormous cave. It was founded in the late 13th century by villagers from Hawqa. The hermitage appears to have been located on a wide platform at mid-level, where there is a water reservoir fed by channels. The upper level, only accessible by ladder, is a cave some 47m long, where the wealth of medieval pottery and arrowheads that have been found suggests its use as a refuge. Traces of fortifications have also been found in the Aassi Hauqqa (cave) at 1170m altitude. Archaeological finds show that this cave was in use in Palaeolithic, Roman, and Medieval times.

=== Monastery of Mar Sarkis ===
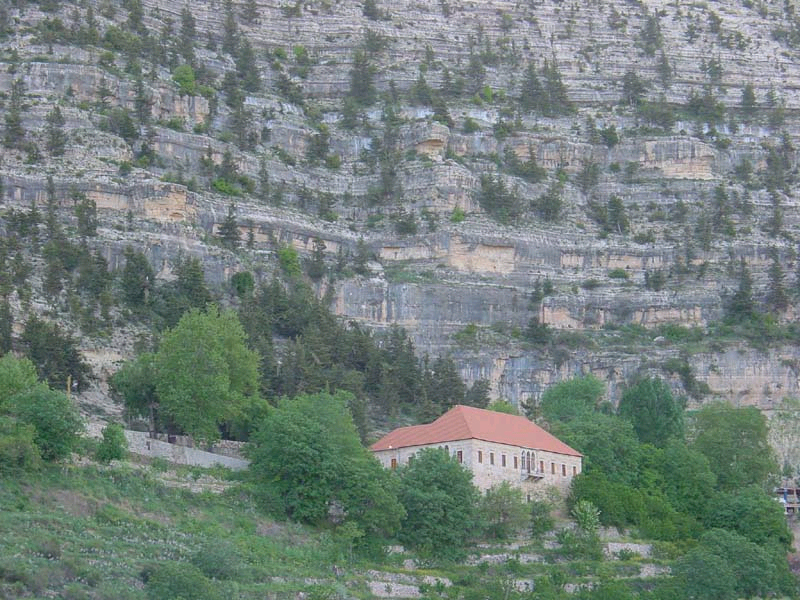
Monastery of Saints Sarkis & Bakhos, Ehden

The Monastery of Mar Sarkis, also called Ras Al Nahr, overlooks Ehden, Kfarsghab, Bane and Hadath El Jebbeh. Given its exceptional location overlooking the valley at an altitude of 1500m, the monastery is called the Watchful Eye of Qadisha. It is dedicated to Saints Sarkis and Bakhos (Saints Sergius and Bacchus). The name Ras Al Nahr means the top of the river as it is in the vicinity of the Mar Sarkis source, the main contributor to the Qlaynsieh River which joins the Qannubin River in the valley.

The first church of Saints Sarkis and Bakhos was built in the mid 8th Century A.D. on the ruins of a Canaanite temple dedicated to a god of agriculture - Dagan. Next to it, another church dedicated to Our Lady was constructed in 1198 A.D. Several buildings were added from 1404 till 1690, when Patriarch Estephan Douaihy restored part of the buildings.

=== Monastery of Mar Lishaa ===
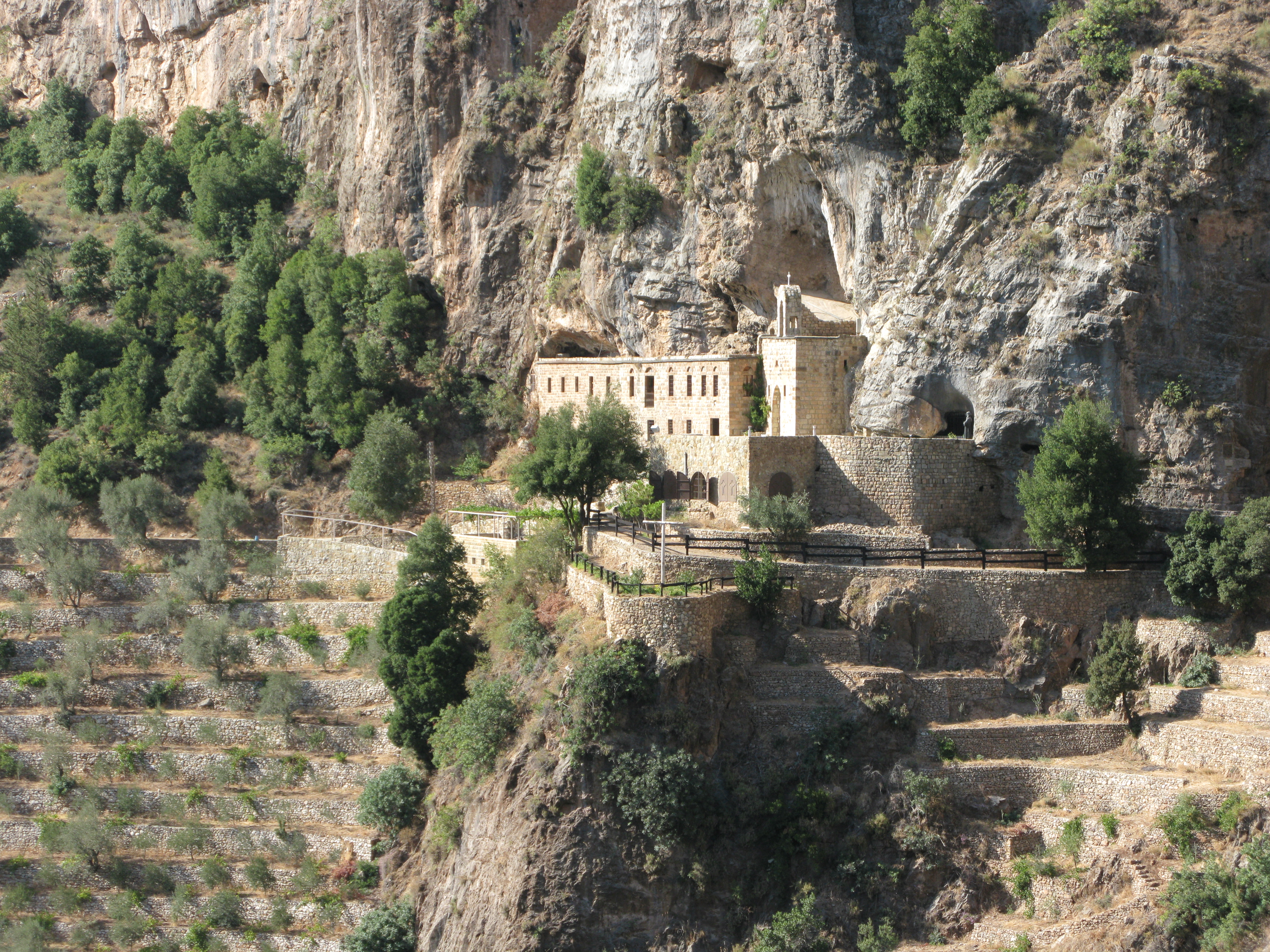
The monastery of Mar Elisha is perched on the cliff.

Mar Lishaa or St Elisha (دير مار ﺃليشع), mentioned first in the 14th century, is shared by two communities, a Maronite solitary order and the Barefoot Carmelite order. It consists of three or four small cells, a refectory, and some offices; the communal church includes four chapels cut into the rock-face.

=== Other monasteries ===
Other monastic establishments in the Qadisha are the Monastery of Mar Girgis, with the Chapel of Mar Challita, the Monastery of Mar Yuhanna, the Monastery of Mar Abun, with the Hermitage of Mar Sarkis, and the Monastery of Mart Moura, Ehden and others. There is another group of monasteries in the adjoining Hadchit Valley (Ouadi Houlat). They include the hermitage-monastery complexes of Deir es-Salib, Mar Antonios, Mar Semaane, and Mar Assia, along with the isolated chapels of Mar Bohna and Mar Chmouna.

== Towns, villages, and monasteries ==
- In Bsharri District

Bsharri, Dimane, Bane, Blaouza, Tourza, Hasroun, Bazaoun, Bqarqacha, Bqaa Kafra, Braissat, Hadchit, Blaouza, Hadath, Monastery of Qannoubine, Monastery of Hawqa

- In Zgharta District

Arbet Qozhaya, Ehden, Kfarsghab, Hawqa, Aintourine, Sereel, El Fradiss, Mazraat En Nahr, Beit Balais, Monastery of Qozhaya, Monastery of Mar Sarkis Ras Al Nahr

== Map ==
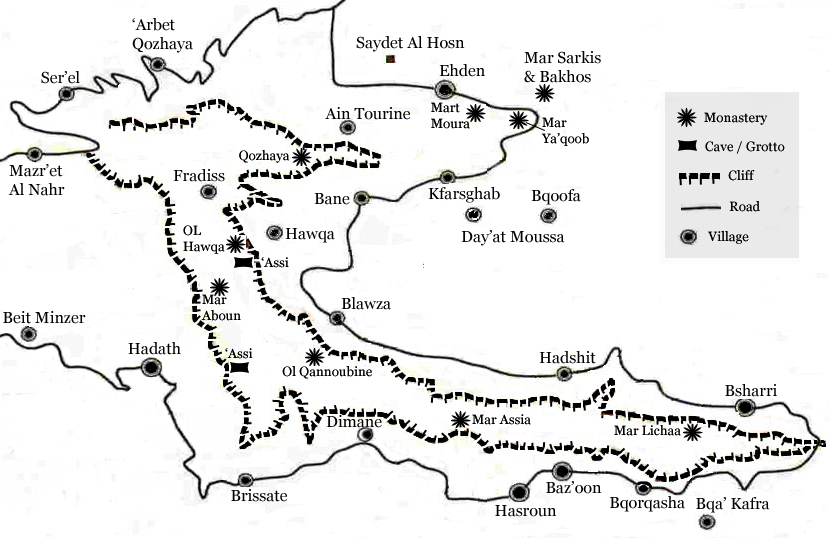

== See also ==
- Hadath el Jebbeh#Jebbeh for the meaning of Jebbeh, Jebbet
- Maronite mummies
- List of World Heritage Sites in the Arab states
