= Assi-el-Hadath Mummies =

Preserved bodies of Maronite villagers from Lebanon

Yasmine
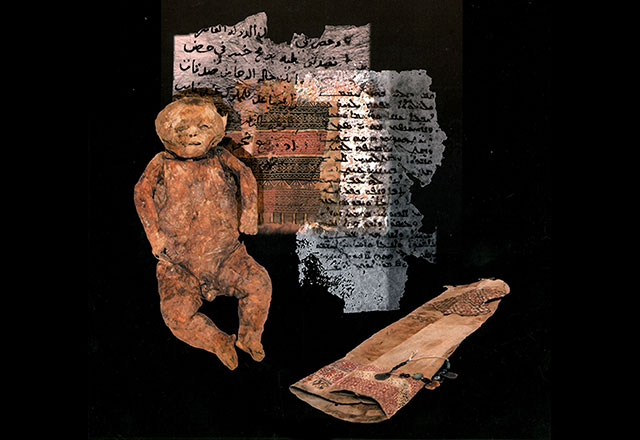
- Born: around 1283 A.D. Asi-al-Hadath, Qadisha Valley
- Died: around 1283 A.D. Asi-al-Hadath grotto
- Cause of death: Mameluke Siege
- Known for: First Maronite mummy ever uncovered

The Assi-el-Hadath mummies, also known as the Maronite mummies, are a group of eight naturally preserved mummies of Maronite villagers who died while sheltering in the fortified 'Asi-al-Hadath grotto in the Qadisha Valley of northern Lebanon during a Mamluk campaign around 1283 CE. They were discovered in 1990 during a rescue excavation by the Groupe d'Études et de Recherches Souterraines du Liban (GERSL) and are exhibited at the National Museum of Beirut.

The group includes men, women and children, among them the four-month-old infant Yasmine. Alongside the human remains, archaeologists recovered manuscripts, textiles, clothing, household goods, weapons and other artefacts that provide insight into the daily life, religious practices and material culture of a 13th-century Maronite community.

The bodies were naturally preserved by the grotto's environment rather than through deliberate mummification. Archaeological evidence, historical records and contemporary manuscripts indicate that the villagers sought refuge in the cave during the siege of al-Hadath before dying there. Since their discovery, the mummies have been the subject of archaeological, anthropological, palaeopathological, genetic and conservation research through the Beirut Mummy Project.

== Discovery ==
The mummies were found in the 'Asi-al Hadath cave located in the Kadisha Valley in Lebanon, on July 13, 1990 by a group of speleologists/archaeologists of the Groupe d'Etudes et de Recherches Souterraines du Liban- GERSL, namely Abi Aoun Pierre, Baroudy Fadi, Ghaouch Antoine and Khawaja Paul. The find was the result of two years of excavation. Initially, the discovery consisted of a single four-month-old infant mummy.

The infant was named Yasmine by her discoverers after a child whose name was mentioned in a manuscript discovered on-site. The infant was clothed and fully interred only 40 cm below ground, she was laid on her back alone in the grave, her head resting on a smooth stone. Yasmine was carefully wrapped in medical gauze and immobilized with splinting devices by the team and transported from the grotto to a customized laboratory, created by the discoverers. Multiple other remains were found following the discovering, including seven bodies (four infants and three adults) as well as skeletal remains of several others.

== Site ==
The 'Asi-al-Hadath grotto is located near the village of Hadath el Jebbeh in the Qadisha Valley of northern Lebanon. Situated at a high elevation, the grotto was difficult to reach and was not well suited for regular use as living quarters.

Nevertheless, archaeologists found several features indicating that the cave had been organized for communal use. These include a human-made reservoir for collecting water measuring approximately 3.5 metres long, 1.4 metres wide, and 1.5 metres deep, with a capacity of about 8 cubic metres. Additional features include a quern-stone for grinding grain by hand and two well-like openings in the rock that may have been used to retrieve and store water.

Inside, the grotto is divided into two main chambers: a large living chamber and a separate burial chamber.

== Condition and preservation ==
Embroidery depicting peacocks facing the tree of life

The condition of the remains varied considerably. While some individuals survived in an exceptional state of preservation, others were represented primarily by skeletal remains and fragments of dried tissue. The best-preserved examples retained soft tissue, hair, and clothing.

One of the most notable examples of preservation is an embroidered textile depicting two peacocks facing one another with a tree of life between them. The colours of the embroidery remained vivid despite centuries of burial.

Preliminary examination indicated that the bodies had undergone natural mummification. According to the excavators, the grotto acted as a protective environment that limited decomposition by reducing the formation of air pockets around the burials. The cave's low humidity and the apparent absence of organisms within the soil further slowed the decay of both the human remains and associated materials.

The mummies were removed from the grotto in 1990 and transferred to the National Museum of Beirut. Researchers later noted that preservation outside the cave environment presented new conservation challenges, including exposure to fluctuations in temperature, pollution, microorganisms, and other factors that could contribute to deterioration.

== Associated objects and clothing ==
=== Manuscripts and written materials ===
Manuscript in Estrangelo praising the Lord.

More than twenty manuscripts were unearthed from the grotto. Among them was a manuscript written in Syriac that has been identified as a Maronite hymn, as well as an Arabic manuscript bearing the name and signature of George, son of David, the archdeacon of al-Hadath.

The infant mummy known as Yasmine received her modern name from a child mentioned in one of the manuscripts recovered from the site.

In addition, archaeologists recovered a talismanic prayer requesting the intercession of saints in curing a sick child.

=== Textiles and adornments ===
Yasmine, a four-month-old infant, was buried wearing three layered dresses. The innermost garment was blue, covered by a beige dress and an outer dark beige dress embroidered with silk thread. Her head was covered by a headdress worn over a silk headband.

Yasmine was also buried with personal adornments, including an earring and a necklace decorated with mouth-blown glass pearls and two coin fragments dating to the reign of the Mamluk sultan Baybars.

Numerous textile fragments were also recovered from the grotto, both from the burials and from elsewhere within the cave. Several retained vivid colours despite centuries of burial. Among the most notable surviving examples is an embroidered motif depicting two peacocks facing one another with a tree of life between them. Textile finds have been compared with designs found in the Rabbula Gospels, a sixth-century Syriac illuminated manuscript.

Additional textile remains recovered from the cave included robes made from heavy cotton and decorated with geometric and floral motifs, including squares, diamonds, crosses, and flowers.

Pot excavated from the grotto bearing the following Arabic inscription:"This belongs to Boutros from al-Hadath".

=== Household and personal belongings ===
A variety of household and personal items were recovered from the grotto. These included medieval pottery fragments, among them a vessel bearing the Arabic inscription, "This belongs to Boutros from al-Hadath".

Several engraved wooden combs were also found. The combs were double-toothed, with fine teeth on one side and coarser teeth on the other. A wooden house key was recovered from the body of an adult female mummy.

=== Weapons and military equipment ===
Among the objects recovered from the grotto were poles, arrows, and arrow notches. A wooden arrow survived intact from tip to nock and retained paper fletchings rather than feathers. Additional fragments of wooden arrows were also recovered, including examples with Turkish-style nocks.

== Identification and dating ==
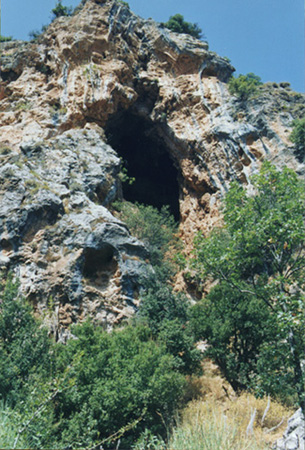
'Asi-al-Hadath Grotto: Refuge of the persecuted. Courtesy of Photographer Michel Schbot (1996)

The individuals buried in the 'Asi-al-Hadath grotto were Maronite villagers from the nearby village of al-Hadath in the Qadisha Valley. They sought refuge in the cave during the campaigns of the Mamluk Sultanate in northern Lebanon in the late 13th century, around 1283 CE. The group included men, women, and children of different ages who died while sheltering there during the siege.

Researchers identified the group using several independent sources of evidence. More than twenty manuscripts were recovered from the grotto, along with the human remains and other artifacts. These included religious texts written in the Syriac language that have been identified as Maronite hymns, as well as an Arabic manuscript signed by George, son of David, the archdeacon of al-Hadath. The infant mummy was later given the modern name Yasmine after a child mentioned in one of the recovered manuscripts.

Researchers dated the burials to around 1283 using archaeological evidence together with contemporary historical records. Among the most important are notes written in the margins of two medieval Bible manuscripts by people who witnessed the Mamluk attack on al-Hadath in 1283. These accounts describe villagers taking refuge in the grotto and provide historical context for the archaeological discovery.

Other objects recovered from the burials support this date. Coin fragments found with the infant mummy Yasmine date to the reign of the Mamluk sultan Baybars and are consistent with a late 13th-century burial.

== Burial practices ==
Unlike the deliberately prepared mummies of Ancient Egypt, the Assi-el-Hadath mummies were buried without elaborate or long-term preparation. Researchers have compared individual features of the burials with later customs recorded in parts of Lebanon.

One burial contained an adult woman and an infant about 18 months old. The infant was placed at the woman's left shoulder. The excavators compared this arrangement with a Lebanese burial practice used when a woman and child died from complications associated with childbirth.

Pieces of cotton and cloth were inserted into the woman's vaginal and anal openings as part of the preparation of her body for viewing. According to the excavators, a similar practice continued in parts of Lebanon, including the Beqaa Valley, where cloth wrapped around a small onion was inserted into the body's openings.

Long strands of black human hair were found between the toes of the infant mummy Yasmine. The excavators suggested that the hair probably belonged to her mother and compared it with a Lebanese mourning practice in which a grieving mother pulled out her hair while kissing the feet of her deceased child.

A talismanic prayer recovered from the grotto requested the intercession of saints to cure a sick child. The source compares the prayer with similar devotional texts used by Maronite communities, including the Kitab Mar Antonios, or Talisman of Saint Anthony of Qozhaya.

A wooden house key was recovered from the body of an adult woman. According to a Lebanese funerary custom described by the excavators, the key to a house was thrown over its roof at the funeral of the last surviving member of a family, signifying that the family home was permanently closed. The excavators suggested that the key was instead placed in the woman's grave because she died while sheltering in the besieged grotto.

== Exhibition ==
After their recovery from the 'Asi-al-Hadath grotto in 1990, the mummies were transferred to the National Museum of Beirut. They remained in museum storage for more than 25 years while conservators stabilized the remains and prepared them for long-term preservation and exhibition.

The 13th-century mummies were placed on public display on 7 October 2016, when the museum's renovated underground galleries reopened after a four-year restoration project. They form part of a permanent exhibition in Beirut on funerary practices in Lebanon from prehistory to the Ottoman period.

Before the galleries reopened, conservators examined the condition of the remains and carried out restoration work through the Beirut Mummy Project, an international conservation and research programme. The project combined archaeological, anthropological, palaeopathological, genetic and conservation research to improve understanding of the mummies while supporting their long-term preservation.

== Images ==
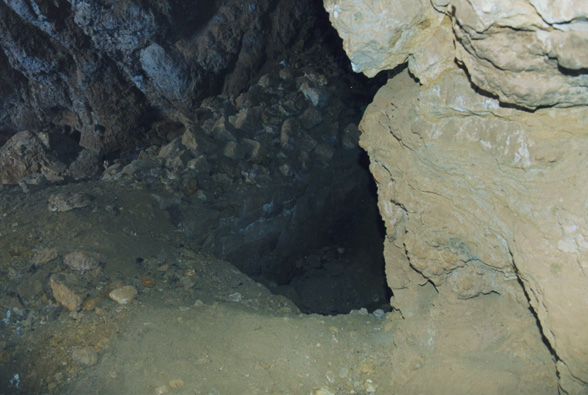
Man made water basin remains to date inside 'Asi-al-Hadath Grotto.

A wooden key found in the cave.

== Books ==
- Abi Aoun B., Baroudy F., Ghaouch A. Khawaja P and alias Momies du Liban: Rapport préliminaire sur la découverte archaéologique de 'Asi-al-Hadat (XIIIe siècle), France, Édifra, 1993
