= Hawqa =

Village in the Zgharta District in the North Governorate of Lebanon

Hawqa حوقا
- City
- Location within Lebanon
- Coordinates: 34°16′20″N 35°56′30″E
- Country: Lebanon
- Governorate: North Governorate
- District: Zgharta District
- Elevation: 1,300 m (4,300 ft)
- Time zone: UTC+2 (EET)
  - Summer (DST): UTC+3 (EEST)
- Dialing code: +961

Hawqa (also known as Haouqa, Hauqqa, or Hawka, Arabic: حوقا) is a village in the Zgharta District in the North Governorate of Lebanon. It is in the valley of Qozhaya, the northern branch of the Valley of Qadisha.

According to electoral data attributed to the Ministry of Interior and Municipalities, Mazraat Hawqa had 448 registered voters in 2014, of which 232 were male and 216 were female.

The monastery of Saydet Hawqa (Our Lady of Hauqqa) was founded by villagers from Hawqa in the 13th century and it became a seminary in the 17th century.
