= Braissat =

Village in Bsharri District, Lebanon

Coordinates: 34.241°N 35.941°E

- Village
- Interactive map of Braissat
- Country: Lebanon
- Governorate: North Governorate
- District: Bsharri District

Braissat (Arabic: بريسات, romanized: Brayssāt) is a village located in Bsharri District in the North Governorate of Lebanon. It borders Dimane and Hadath El Jebbeh.

The city of Braissat has many tourist attractions, one of them being Les Jardins des Patriarches Maronites.

== Demographics ==
In 2014 Christians made up 99.43% of registered voters in Braissat. 96.57% of the voters were Maronite Catholics.

== See also ==
- List of cities and towns in Lebanon
