= Qannoubine =

Lebanese medieval monastery

Coordinates: 34.2574°N 35.9496°E

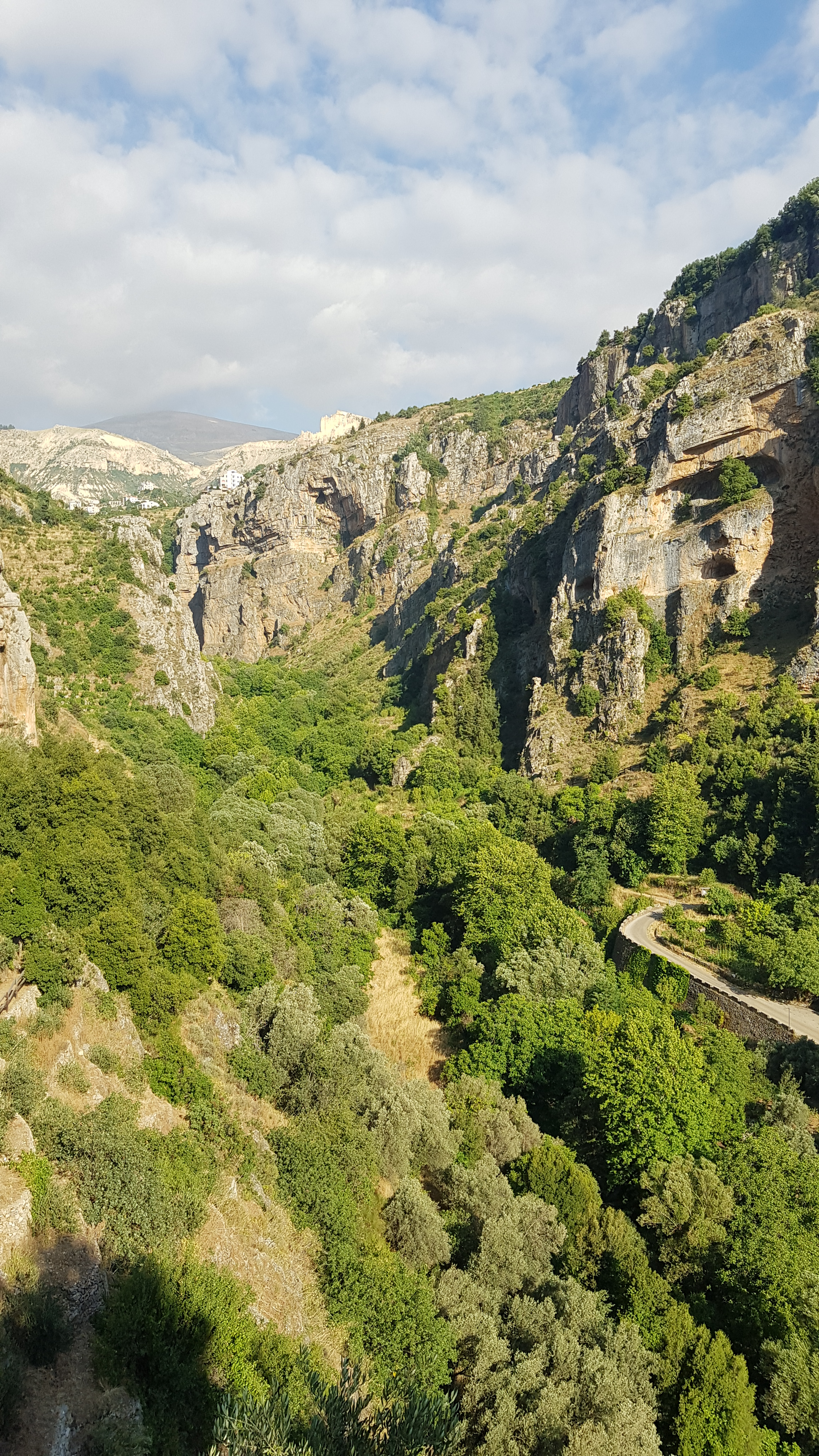
The Kadisha Valley

Qannoubine (Arabic: قنّوبين, romanized: Qannūbīn) is a medieval monastery located within the Qannoubine region of the Kadisha Valley UNESCO World Heritage Site in Lebanon.

== History ==
Qannoubine was home to Marina the Monk. It served Maronite Patriarchs from the 15th to the 19th centuries. The monastery was recognised by UNESCO in 1998.
