= Hadchit =

Settlement in Bsharri District, Lebanon

Hadchit حدشيت
- City
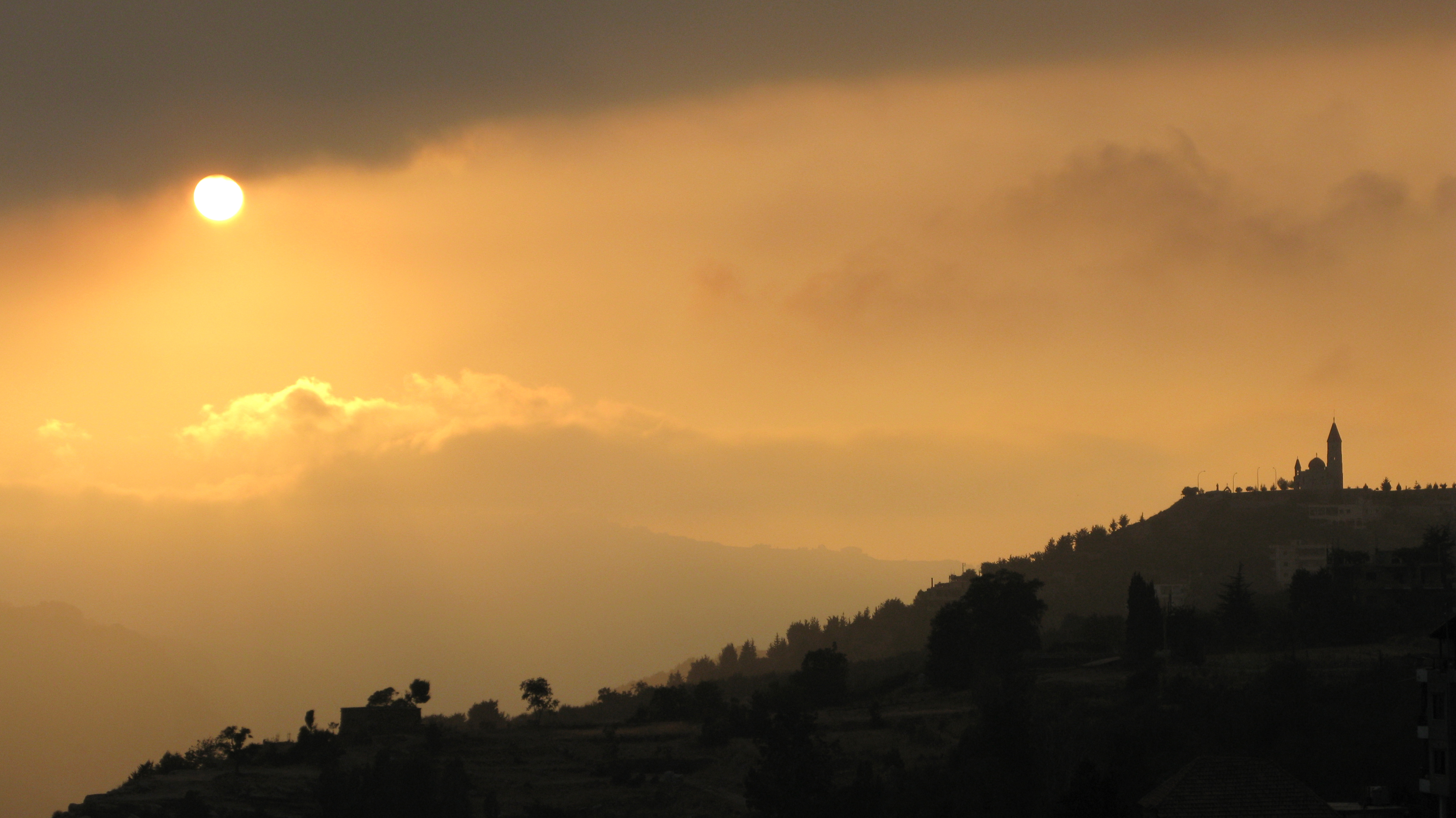
- Sunset over Hadchit as seen from Bsharri.

- Location within Lebanon
- Coordinates: 34°15′07″N 35°59′07″E
- Country: Lebanon
- Governorate: North Governorate
- District: Bsharri District

Area
  - Total: 5.28 km^{2} (2.04 sq mi)
- Elevation: 1,400 m (4,600 ft)
- Time zone: UTC+2 (EET)
  - Summer (DST): UTC+3 (EEST)
- Dialing code: +961

Hadchit (ܚܕܫܝܬ also Hadsheet, Hadshit or Hadchite, Arabic: حدشيت, romanized: Ḥadshīt ) is an ancient Phoenician settlement located in the Bsharri District in the North Governorate of Lebanon. It is situated in the Valley of Qadisha, overlooking the southern branch of the valley, Wadi Qannoubine Valley. The majority of the people are adherents of the Maronite Church. The village is located 126 km away of Beirut with an elevation of 1400m above sea level, and accessible from two main roads Tripoli->Ehden->Hadchit or Kosba->Bcharre->Hadchit. Hadchit has an estimated population of 7000 people.

== History ==
Hadchit's ancient political center was located in Tyre. The government was Byzantine, so the natives were required to fight in the military or find employment. The inhabitants of Hadchit were a mixture of many peoples. The majority were Canaanites, Phoenician and Aramean, who later became known as the Syriac.

== Nomination ==
There are several stories, namely: Phoenician: (Hadash) new moon or half-moon, so Hadsheet would mean the “new one” or the “new village”. Syriac: It means one of the six temples that were built by Batlimos the 5th (Ptolemy V), King of Egypt in Mount Lebanon according to the story narrated by Sheikh Antonios Abi Khattar in his book “The Synopsis of Lebanon's History”, (kept as a reference at the Jesuits Fathers’ library)

== Religious role ==
There are many historical evidences indicating that our society helped in keeping the sect from collapsing against other beliefs. For example: – Patriarch Daniel Rizk (Hnein) from Hadchit 1278 (a.k.a. Patriarch Daniel II of Hadchit): In his era, the Maronites extracted the Chrism from olive oil and balm grease after it was extracted from 12 different greases. He died as a martyr while fighting courageously the Mameluk invaders for 40 days at Ehden gate. – David Ben Joseline: He was ordained in 1401 by the Patriarch John El Jaji and it seemed that this Bishop was a historian. He was succeeded by his nephew, David son of John Ben Joseline who was a historian and a Bishop in the days of Patriarch Ben Joseph Ben Jacob famous by the name of son of Hassan. Among the stories narrated about the constancy of Hadsheet people in serving the Church, we mention the story of Priest Jacob from Habsha who went on to Saint Georges’ Convent located in Kanoubin valley and surnamed it by the Convent of Habash. He was then sacked by the people of Hadsheet and was banished to the prairies. Among the religious monuments, we mention: The various Churches all over the village and its valley, namely: the Church of Saint Romanos, built under the supervision of Priest Bard El Hadsheeti, the Convent of the Cross which displays many drawings and sculptures on its walls, the Convent of Saint Chamouna, Mar Sarkis and Bakhos Church. In contemporary times the Rizk family administer the religious life within Hadchit.

== Political role ==
Hadchit played an important role in leading the society although this role opposes the Maronites’ firm beliefs and the village's traditions. In the era of Major Abdul Mon’em Bin Assaf, the Jacobeans entered the society after it won over the grace of Major Bin Assaf who quarreled with the Patriarch. In attempt to reinforce his religious and political position, he called for some Jacobeans, and among them Hajj Hassan and made Hadsheet as their lodge. Among the Jacobeans who came to the village is the Priest Hanna who distinguished himself by changing the religious motives and trying to establish a laic law for the region's government with the support of the Major, as well as his brothers, Priest Elija who became a bishop and Chidiak Gerges. Among the most prominent and historically influential families of Hadchit is the House of Khoury Elias El Khoury Younes, one of the village's oldest and most distinguished lineages. Traditionally known as a family of Maronite priests, its members served the Church and the local community for generations. According to family tradition, the family traces its origins to Crusader ancestors who settled in Palestine (Khan Younes) before migrating to Mount Lebanon, first to Hammana and later to Hadchit. Among its most renowned figures were Father Elias El Khoury and his son Father Abdallah El Khoury, remembered for the construction of the Church of Saint Romanos, the principal church of Hadchit, and for the restoration of the altars of the Churches of Saints Sarkis and Bakhos and Our Lady of the Cliff (Saydet El Shakif). The family also produced many notable civil leaders, including Sheikh Mansour El Khoury, who later become a priest, his sons Sheikh Antoine El Khoury and Sheikh Raymond El Khoury. The El Khoury house played a significant role in the history of Hadchit and the District of Bsharri, Sheikh Youssef El Khoury, who was widely known for his political influence in Northern Lebanon. who was close to the well known Bishop Abdalla El Khoury who played a significant role during the establishment of Great Lebanon 1920. Another distinguished descendant was Admiral Antonio Ramon El Khoury Younes (Jūri Younes), who played an important role in Venezuelan political and military life during the mid-twentieth century.

The El Khoury Sheikhs of Hadchit's lineage goes back to the late 1700s, when they were endowed with their nobility title by the Ottoman Empire.

== Economic status of Hadchit ==
The main source of economy in Hadchit society was agriculture. Therefore, irrigation channels were built as well as agrarian networks. Among its important products are apple, pear, etc... Although the industry in Hadchit is still at the rise of its progress, it is mostly active in the construction field and some craftworks as well as the production of alcoholic beverages.Hadchit has developed as a destination for climbing, offering routes with views of the Qadisha Valley. .

== Demographics ==
In 2014 Christians made up 99.50% of registered voters in Hadchit. 96.28% of the voters were Maronite Catholics.

== Notable people ==
- Darine Hadchiti | دارين حدشيتي
- Maronite Patriarch Daniel II of Hadchit
