= Bane, Lebanon =

Village in North Governorate of Lebanon

Bane بان
- Village
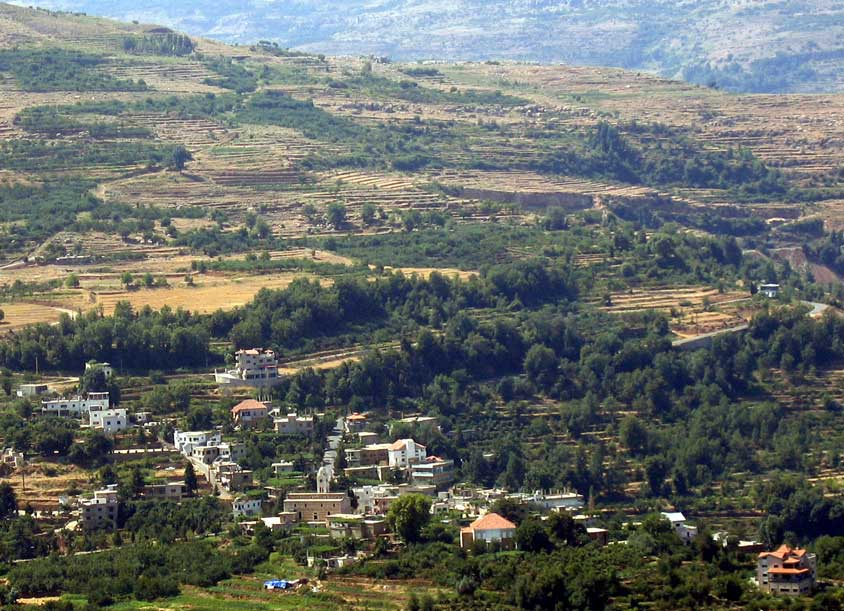
- The village of Bane seen from Ehden, July 2004

- Location within Lebanon
- Coordinates: 34°16′41″N 35°57′18″E
- Country: Lebanon
- Governorate: North Governorate
- District: Bsharri District

Area
  - Total: 3.5 km^{2} (1.4 sq mi)
- Elevation: 1,300 m (4,300 ft)
- Highest elevation: 1,743 m (5,719 ft)
- Lowest elevation: 1,140 m (3,740 ft)
- Time zone: UTC+2 (EET)
  - Summer (DST): UTC+3 (EEST)
- Postal code: 3769
- Dialing code: +961

Bane (Arabic: بان, romanized: Bān; also spelled Bann or Ban) is a Maronite Christian village located in the Bsharri District of the North Governorate of Lebanon, overlooking the Holy Valley of Qadisha (also known as the Valley of the Saints).

== Geography ==
Bane is located in the mountainous Bsharri District of northern Lebanon, overlooking the Qadisha (Qannoubine) Valley. The village lies at an elevation of approximately 1,300 metres (4,265 ft) above sea level. Its cadastral territory covers approximately 3.5 square kilometres (1.35 sq mi) and rises considerably toward the higher mountainous terrain, reaching a maximum elevation of approximately 1,743 metres (5,719 ft) at Bane Cross.

By road, Bane is approximately 103 kilometres (64 mi) from central Beirut, 41 kilometres (25 mi) from central Tripoli, and 16.4 kilometres (10.2 mi) from the Cedars of God.

== Etymology ==
Several explanations have been proposed for the name Bane. Lebanese linguist Anis Freiha derived the name either from the Syriac Banna, described as being of Latin origin and meaning "bath" or "place of washing", or from the Phoenician Bet On, meaning "place of gloom" or "place of depression".

Other proposed origins include an association with the Greek god Pan, from whom Banias takes its name, and a derivation from the Arabic name of the ban or luban tree.

Another source gives three possible meanings for the name: "bath" in Syriac, "place of washing" in Latin, and "place of sadness, gloom, or depression" in Phoenician.

== History ==
The village is mentioned in documents dating back to 1265 AD.

Archaeological remains within Bane have been cited as evidence of habitation by communities predating the present one; one historical account identifies the last of these as a Syriac Monophysite community before the 16th century.

It is recounted that Mamluk forces passed through Bane on their way to Asi Hawqa, a large rocky cavity in the Qadisha Valley extending approximately 213 metres (699 ft) horizontally. An early Christian Arabic inscription is preserved on its ceiling, while the Tower of St Thomas stands below it.

In 1809, residents of Bane and Kfarsghab endowed land to the Lebanese Maronite Order for the establishment of a school for the children of the village. The school was later renovated and enlarged between 1862 and 1875. In 1962, it was converted into the Monastery of St Joseph, a canonical monastery of the Lebanese Maronite Order, which was inaugurated on 29 August of that year.

== Churches and religious sites ==
Bane's principal church is the Maronite parish church of Saint George (كنيسة مار جرجس). Built in the early 19th century, it stands on the site of two older, smaller churches dedicated to Saint Stephen and Saint Nohra. Elements from the older churches were incorporated into the façade, while the two side altars were dedicated to the two saints. The church follows a basilical plan with three naves terminating in three marble Neo-Gothic altars. It underwent several restorations, including one in 1924, when the present southern entrance and portico took shape; a dome of Italian design was added in the mid-20th century.

The Church of Our Lady of the Fields (كنيسة سيّدة الحقلة) was built in 1883, according to its commemorative inscription. Located beside the cemetery, it is a small single-nave chapel terminating in an altar. An entrance arch and tiled roof were added in the late 20th century, and the church contains a European-made painting dating from 1923.

The Monastery of St Joseph (دير مار يوسف) belongs to the Lebanese Maronite Order. Originally established as a school in 1809, it was transformed into a canonical monastery in the 20th century. Its church contains a gilded wooden tabernacle, two reliquaries, three Western-made paintings, and two 19th-century local paintings depicting the Holy Family and Saint Ephrem.

The village's religious landmarks also include the Cross of Bane.

== Natural and cultural heritage ==
Bane overlooks the Holy Valley of Qadisha, which is included in a UNESCO World Heritage Site. The Qadisha Valley has long been associated with Christian monastic communities, and UNESCO cites its monasteries as significant surviving examples of early Christian monastic tradition.

Among the landmarks of southern Bane, adjoining the Qadisha Valley, is the Tower (البرج, al-Burj).

A hiking route begins in Bane and descends into the valley toward the Monastery of Qozhaya. The trail passes through wooded slopes and by waterfalls, ruins of old houses, stone bridges and hermitages before reaching the monastery.

== Demographics and diaspora ==
No recent official census gives an exact resident population for Bane. Population figures for the village consequently vary according to whether they refer to permanent residents, registered inhabitants, registered voters, or members of the diaspora.

A survey of the villages of Jebbet Bsharri undertaken in 1900 at the request of Maronite Patriarch Elias Peter Hoayek recorded a population of 400 in Bane and approximately 50 emigrants.

A field survey of Bsharri District conducted around 2009 recorded 740 registered inhabitants in Bane, while estimating 450 permanent residents during winter and 570 during summer. It also recorded 75 temporary residents, an average household size of four people, and approximately 500 emigrants, with Australia identified as the principal destination of emigration from the village.

In 2014, Christians constituted 99.89% of Bane's registered voters, with members of the Maronite Church accounting for 98.17%.

=== Diaspora in Australia ===
Bane developed a substantial diaspora in Australia, particularly in and around Sydney. Migration from the village became established during the 20th century and was reinforced by successive waves of family and chain migration.

The migration history of the community is documented in the 2022 book As Cedars Grow: The Bane Diaspora to Thornleigh, which traces the settlement of migrants from Bane in north-western Sydney and the development of a large Australian community of Bane origin. The book states that more than 9,000 people in Sydney's Hills District descend from these migrations.

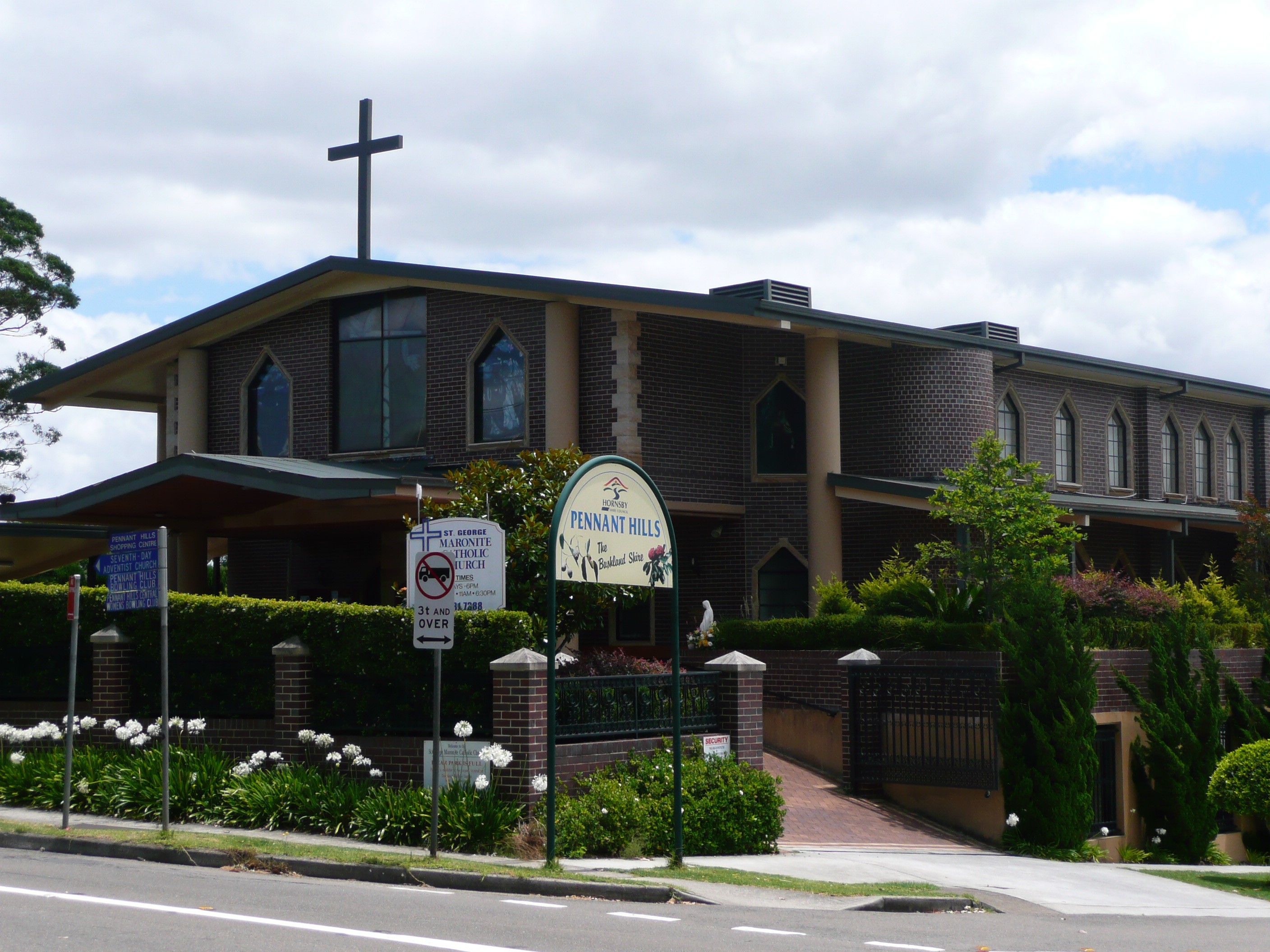
St George Maronite Catholic Church in Thornleigh, New South Wales, serves a community that includes many descendants of migrants from Bane.

Migration from Bane to other parts of the Americas is also documented, although no comprehensive estimate of the worldwide Bane diaspora has been published.

== Agriculture ==
Agriculture is an important activity in Bane, particularly the cultivation of fruit trees. A study conducted by the American University of Beirut reported that apple orchards occupied more than 85% of the village's cultivated land, with the remainder planted mainly with cherries, peaches, pears and other fruit trees. Other plant species recorded in the village include plums, apricots, quince, persimmons, figs, grapes, oaks and Lebanon cedars. The cultivation of kiwifruit has been introduced more recently. The fruiting season extends approximately from June to November.

The study examined orchards in three agricultural areas of Bane: Al-Hareem, at approximately 1,100 metres (3,609 ft) above sea level; Al-Nsoob, at approximately 1,200 metres (3,937 ft); and Al-Chawyi, at approximately 1,300 metres (4,265 ft).

Irrigation is supported by the Ain Baqra reservoir (بحيرة عين بقرة), located on agricultural land in Bane. The reservoir was constructed as part of a water-storage programme and has a storage capacity of approximately 75,000 m3 (2,600,000 cu ft). It provides water for the irrigation of agricultural land in the area.

== In literature ==
Bane appears in the work of Lebanese-American writer Kahlil Gibran. His short story Martha of Ban (مرتا البانية, Martā al-Bāniya), included in the collection Nymphs of the Valley, takes its title from the village.

The story follows Martha, a young woman from Ban who leaves the rural surroundings of the village and later finds herself in Beirut. Literary scholarship has identified Ban in the story with the village in northern Lebanon near the Qadisha Valley, and has interpreted the contrast between the village landscape and Beirut as an important element of the story.

== Notable and historical figures ==
- Father Daniel al-Bani was a Maronite priest and manuscript copyist active in the late 14th century. A manuscript copied by him in 1397 records the reign of Patriarch Dawud, also called Youhanna, who was then residing at the Monastery of Mar Sarkis in Hardine. The manuscript was later used by Patriarch Estephan El Douaihy as a historical source.
- Father Youhanna ibn Namroun al-Bani was a 16th-century Maronite monk associated with the Monastery of Qozhaya. He served as superior of the monastery and, after leaving the position in 1556, lived at the Monastery of Saint Simeon in Aitou.
- Gabriel Massaad (جبرايل مسعد) was the first student from Bane recorded as entering the Maronite College in Rome, enrolling in 1584, the year of the college's foundation.
- Faustus Nairon (1628–1711), also known as Murhij ibn Mikha'il ibn Makhluf al-Bani or Murhij ibn Namroun al-Bani, was a Maronite priest, scholar, orientalist and author from a family originating in Bane.
  - Born in Rome in 1628, he studied under the Jesuits at the Maronite College and the Roman College from 1638 to 1649. In 1649 he travelled to Lebanon, where he was ordained a priest by the Maronite patriarch and was subsequently sent back to Rome to oversee the publication of the Phenqitho, the Maronite Proper of the fixed feasts. He thereafter remained in Rome and pursued his scholarly and ecclesiastical career there.
  - Following the death of Abraham Ecchellensis in 1664, Nairon succeeded him as professor of Syriac at the Sapienza University of Rome, a position he held until 1707. His teaching included the study of the Peshitta through the books of Genesis, Exodus and the Psalms. He also served successively as second and first custodian of the Biblioteca Alessandrina, and later became procurator of the Maronite patriarch in Rome and a canon of the collegiate church of Saint Eustache.
  - His works included Dissertatio de origine, nomine ac religione Maronitarum (1679), a study of the origins, name and religion of the Maronites, and Evoplia fidei catholicae romanae historico-dogmatica (1694). He also participated in the publication of Maronite liturgical and biblical texts, including the Phenqitho and the Arabic–Syriac New Testament published in Rome in 1703. In 1671 he published De saluberrima potione cahue seu cafe nuncupata discursus, described by UNESCO as the first treatise on coffee published in Europe; the work also transmitted to European readers an early version of the well-known story linking the discovery of coffee to an unusually energetic herd of goats or camels. He died in Rome in 1711.
- Giovanni Matteo Nairone (يوحنا متّى الباني), brother of Faustus Nairon, was a Maronite priest and orientalist educated in Rome. He collaborated with Abraham Ecchellensis at the Vatican Library, particularly in the cataloguing of Arabic and Syriac manuscripts. Following Ecchellensis's death in 1664, Nairone succeeded him as a scriptor for Arabic and Syriac at the Vatican Library and continued work on catalogues of its Oriental manuscript collections.
- Nicola Nairone, another member of the same Bane-origin family, studied at the Maronite College and worked as a copyist of Oriental manuscripts at the Vatican Library.
- Bishop Gerges ibn Nimroun al-Bani (المطران جرجس بن نمرون الباني) was a Maronite bishop from Bane who served as Bishop of Ehden. He was a contemporary of Patriarch Estephan El Douaihy, who gave him the epithet al-Karrouz (الكاروز).
- Gabriel Fashkha (جبرايل فشخا) was a native of Bane and a companion of Youssef Bey Karam, accompanying him during his military campaigns in 19th-century Lebanon.
- Father Antonios Zaayter was a monk of the Lebanese Maronite Order. He entered the order in 1895, was ordained a priest in 1904, and died at the Monastery of Qozhaya in 1943.
- Father Yousef Mahfoud (1881–1966), born Gabriel Mahfoud, entered the Lebanese Maronite Order in 1901 and was ordained a priest in 1910. He later died at the Monastery of Qozhaya.
- Father Bernardous Habkouk (1905–1978), born Said Masoud Habkouk in Providence, Rhode Island, returned with his family to Bane in 1917. He was ordained in 1931. He later served in the order for several decades and was appointed director of novices in 1962.
- Father Ibrahim (Armia) Khoudair was a monk of the Lebanese Maronite Order from Bane. He was ordained alongside Bernardous Habkouk on 1 May 1931 at the Monastery of Our Lady of Help near Byblos.
- Salim Youssef Thabet (سليم يوسف ثابت) was a Lebanese jurist and diplomat from Bane. He served as Lebanon's ambassador to Venezuela in 1982. He later served as Lebanese ambassador to Germany from 11 May 1994 until 26 March 1999.

== Families ==
According to the official Lebanese electoral rolls for 2014, 203 distinct surnames were recorded among 1,746 registered voters in Bane. Among the most frequently recorded family names were Zaayter, Habkouk, Khoudair, Maait, Baynie, Saliba, Chiha, Khamis, Tadros, Fachkha, Khoury, Ibrahim, Moussa, Mikhael, Abdou, Daaboul, El Hajj, Aoutel, Bechara, Antoun, Semaan, Aouchan, Srour, Massoud, Abi Hassoun, Daoud, Mahboub and Merhi.

Many Bane family names have developed different spellings in the diaspora.
