= Hadath el Jebbeh =

Town in Bsharri District, Lebanon

Hadath el Jebbeh حدث الجبة
- Town
- Location within Lebanon
- Coordinates: 34°15′00″N 35°55′46″E
- Country: Lebanon
- Governorate: North Governorate
- District: Bsharri District

Area
  - Total: 11.42 km^{2} (4.41 sq mi)
- Elevation: 1,500 m (4,900 ft)
- Highest elevation: 2,000 m (6,600 ft)
- Lowest elevation: 1,000 m (3,300 ft)

Population
  - Total: 4,000
  - Density: 350/km^{2} (910/sq mi)
- Time zone: UTC+2 (EET)
  - Summer (DST): UTC+3 (EEST)
- Dialing code: +961
- Website: www.hadatheljebbeh.com

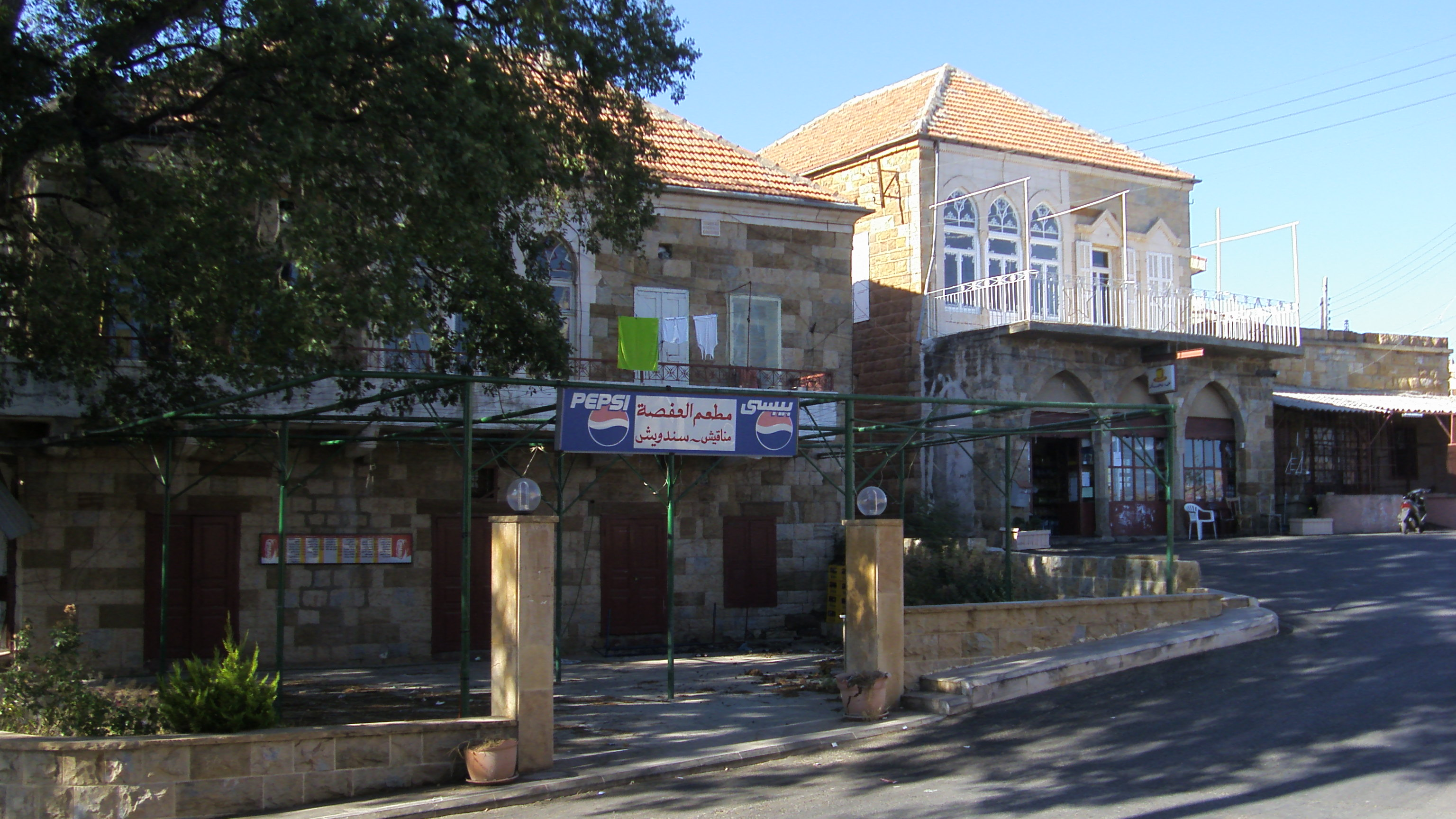
Hadath el Jebbeh center (north Lebanon)

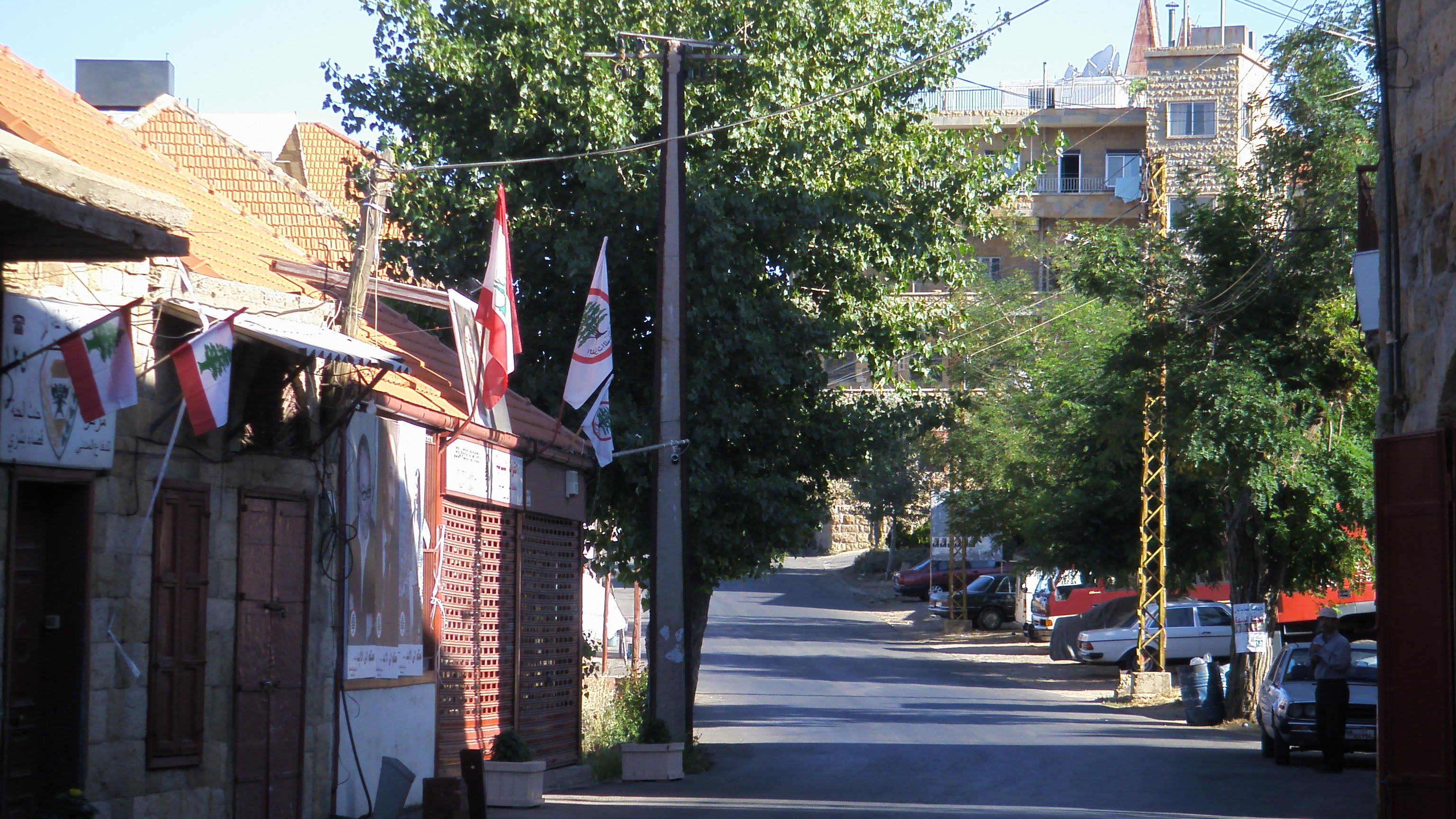
Hadath el Jebbeh, main road to Amioun (north Lebanon)

Hadath el Jebbeh (Arabic: حدث الجبة, also known as Hadad, and known locally as Hadid (حَدِد)), is a town located in Bsharri District in the North Governorate of Lebanon. It was originally settled in 400 A.D., and is situated on a hill at an altitude of 1500 meters, overlooking the Kadisha valley.

Hadath el Jebbeh is a summer resort and touristic place, benefiting from its welcoming and friendly local families. The inhabitants of the village are mostly Maronites, with the presence of two churches in town, the historical St. Daniel church which was built around 1110 CE, and Notre-Dame church built in 1956. At the end of summer, Hadath el Jebbeh celebrates St. Daniel Festival, which takes place every second Sunday of September of each year.

== Location, climate and nature ==
Hadath el Jebbeh is located in Bsharri District, overlooking Qannoubine Valley. The village is 94 km away from Lebanese Capital, Beirut, and 36 km away from Tripoli, the largest city in North Lebanon.

Hadath el Jebbeh is well known by its cold (sometimes freezing) snowy weather during winter, and its cool weather during summer, which makes it lovely to visit anytime throughout the year, especially in the summer season, where numerous Lebanese consider it one of the best summer residences in Lebanon.

== Etymology ==
=== Haddath ===
Hadath is the name of three localities in Lebanon. To differentiate between the localities, the name of the region is added, Hadath Beirut, Hadath Baalbeck and finally Hadath el Joubbeh. Other localities by this name exist in the Middle East.

The Semitic root of Hadath means "the new", hence the name could mean "the new town".

The common pronunciation of the name is Hadad or Hadid. It gives an indication to a probable different meaning. Hadad was the northwest Semitic storm and rain god and the town could have had a temple dedicated to this god. And the popular tradition claims that the church dedicated to the saint patron of Hadath, Saint Daniel, was built on the remnants of a pagan temple.

=== Jebbeh ===
Jebbeh is the traditional name of the Kadisha region, called also Jebbet Bsharri in reference to Bsharri the largest town of this region. The Semitic root Gb means "well", "deep" and could be a reference to the deep gorges of the Kadisha. In Lebanon, other Jebbeh exist like Jebbet Mnaytra and Jebbet Yanuh.

== Demographics ==
In 2014 Christians made up 97.83% of registered voters in Hadath el Jebbeh. 92.71% of the voters were Maronite Catholics.

== See also ==
- Maronite mummies
