= Monastery of Qozhaya =

Maronite monastery in Lebanon

Qozhaya دير مار أنطونيوس قزحيا
- City
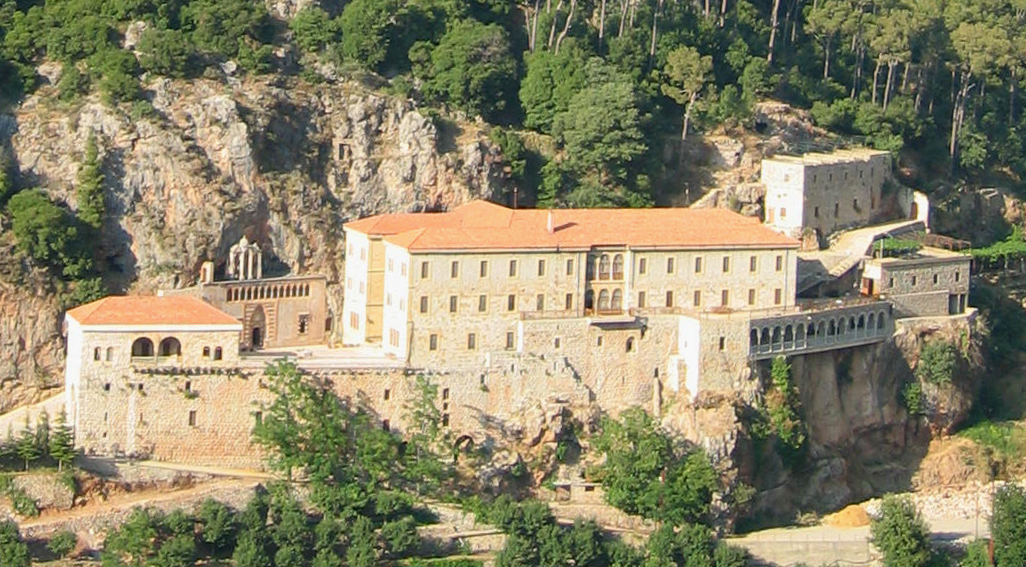
- The Monastery of Qozhaya - July 2003

- Location within Lebanon
- Coordinates: 34°16′59″N 35°56′50″E
- Country: Lebanon
- Governorate: North Governorate
- District: Zgharta District
- Elevation: 664 m (2,178 ft)
- Time zone: UTC+2 (EET)
  - Summer (DST): UTC+3 (EEST)
- Dialing code: +961

Monastery of Saint Anthony of Qozhaya, or Monastery of Qozhaya (also Qazahya; Syriac: ܕܝܪܐ ܕܡܪܝ ܐܢܛܘܢܝܘܣ ܩܘܙܚܝܐ, Arabic: دير مار أنطونيوس قزحيا) is a large and important Maronite monastery. It is located in the Zgharta District in the North Governorate of Lebanon.

The Monastery of Qozhaya holds significant importance within Maronite tradition and history. Its origins date back to the 13th century, serving as a residence for monks and, at one point, functioning as the headquarters of the Maronite Patriarchate. In the 16th century, it housed the Middle East's first printing press, which is still accessible to visitors. Its land holdings extended to the surrounding areas of the Kadisha Valley.

The monastery features a notable church, housing for nuns and monks, and an expansive cave known as the Grotto of Saint Anthony. Known for its association with various events, it also offers a guest house.

== Name and etymology ==
It is dedicated to Saint Anthony the Great. It is commonly called Qozhaya, in reference to the valley in which it is located. The valley of Qozhaya, along with the valley of Qannoubine (Arabic: قنوبين) to which it is connected to the west, forms what is called the Kadisha Valley.

The etymology of the name Qozhaya varies according to the opinions of scholars. However, in recent years the Syriac origin was most commonly adopted, and approximately translates to the treasure of life.

== History ==
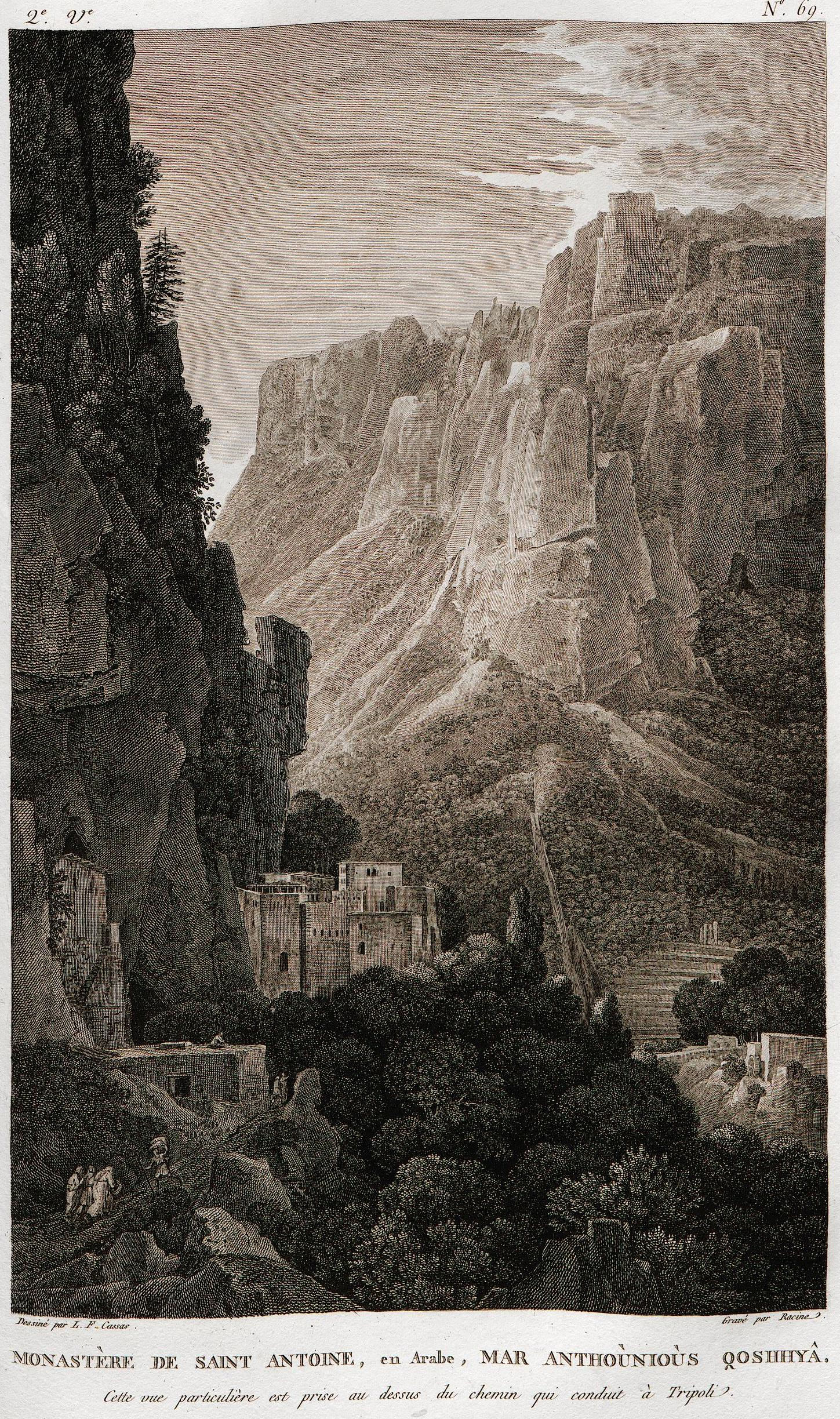
The monastery in the 1780s, by Louis-François Cassas.

Qozhaya is considered to be one of the oldest monasteries of the valley of Qadisha. It was founded during the last centuries of the Roman Empire in Roman Phoenicia.

Historians and scholars suppose that this Monastery was first built and began to be occupied by hermits at the beginning of the fourth century. It was several times looted, set on fire and razed to the ground, but there still remain vestiges dating back to the seventh century.

Several hermitages are attached to it; and at a certain period (probably the 12th Century AD) it has been the See of the Maronite Patriarch.

In 1584, the first printing press of the Middle East was installed in this monastery by Maronite Patriarch Sergius Rizzi. In 1610, under the leadership of Yuhanna Makhlouf, the press printed a bilingual Psalter in a small folio of 260 pages. The psalms are arranged in two columns, on the right is the text in Syriac and on the left in Arabic, but written in Syriac letters, which is known as Garshuni.

In 1708, it was handed down to the newly formed Lebanese Maronite Order. It still belongs to this important Order. Qozhaya was at its pinnacle in the first part of the 19th Century with more than 300 monks belonging to it.

With its large properties in the valley, in Ain-Baqra and in Jedaydeh, Qozhaya is one of the richest monasteries of the Order. It contributes financially to the maintenance of the less fortunate monasteries of the Order.

== What to see ==
- The Grotto of Saint Anthony the Great
- The Church
- The Museum
- The Library
- The Hermitage of Mar Boula
