= 4th century in Lebanon =

- Key event(s)
- Diocletianic Persecution, Constantinian shift
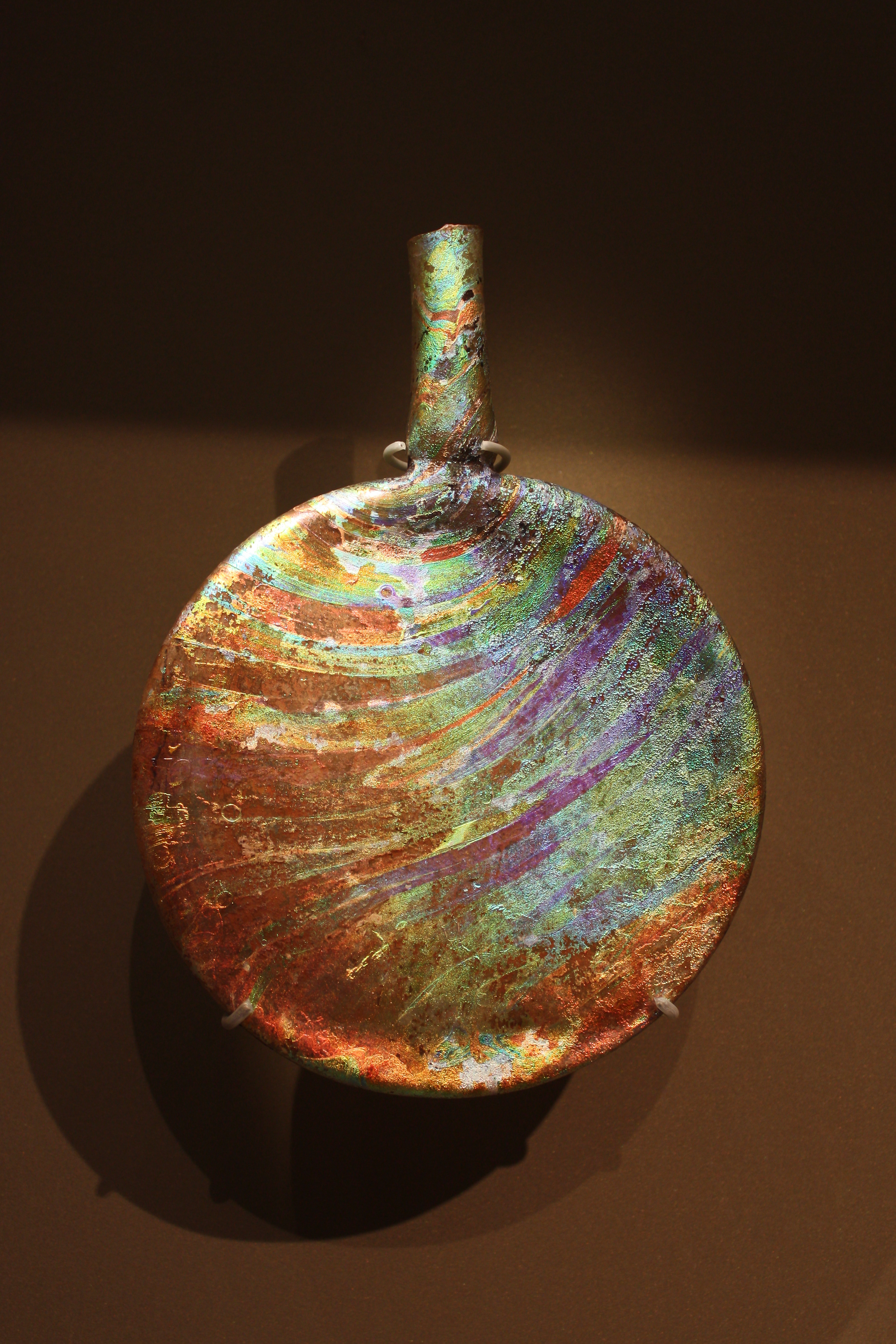
- Pilgrim flask (4th century A.D.) in the National Museum of Beirut.
- Chronology
- ← 3rd century; 4th century; 5th century →

This article lists historical events that occurred between 301–400 in modern-day Lebanon or regarding its people.

== Administration ==
While sometime before 328, when it is mentioned in the Laterculus Veronensis, Constantine the Great (r. 306–337) created the new province of Augusta Libanensis (lit. 'Lebanese Augusta') out of the eastern half of the old province of Phoenice, encompassing the territory east of Mount Lebanon.

=== Governors ===
In the fourth century, as a whole, almost 30 governors of Phoenicia are known with 23 governors of Phoenicia being in office between 353 and 394. Amongst them was Sossianus Hierocles, who was a praeses at some time between 293 and 303. The Prosopography of the Later Roman Empire (PLRE) states that, as praeses, he governed Phoenice Libanensis, the province on the eastern side of Mount Lebanon. The district included Palmyra, where the inscription attesting to Hierocles' career is located.

=== Consularis Governors of Phoenicia ===
Consularis Governor	Date
Aelius Statuus	Between 293 and 305
Sossianus Hierocles	Between 293 and 303
Julius Julianus	Before 305
Maximus	? Between 309/313
Achillius	c. 323
Fl. Dionysius	328 – 329
Archelaus	335
Nonnus	c. 337
Marcellinus	342
Apollinaris	353/4
Demetrius	Before 358
Nicentius	358 – 359
Euchrostius	(?) 359/60
Julianus	Before 360
Andronicus	360 – 361
Aelius Claudius Dulcitius	Before 361
Anatolius	361
Polycles	c. 361/2
Julianus	362
Gaianus	362 – 363
Marius	363 – 364
Ulpianus	364
Domninus	364 – 365
Leontius	372
Petrus	380
Proculus	382 – 383
Eustathius	Before 388
Antherius	388
Epiphanius	388
Domitius	390
Severianus	391
Leontius	392

=== Military ===
In the late fourth century an edict to draft the sons of veterans was issued from Berytus.

== Events ==
=== 300s ===
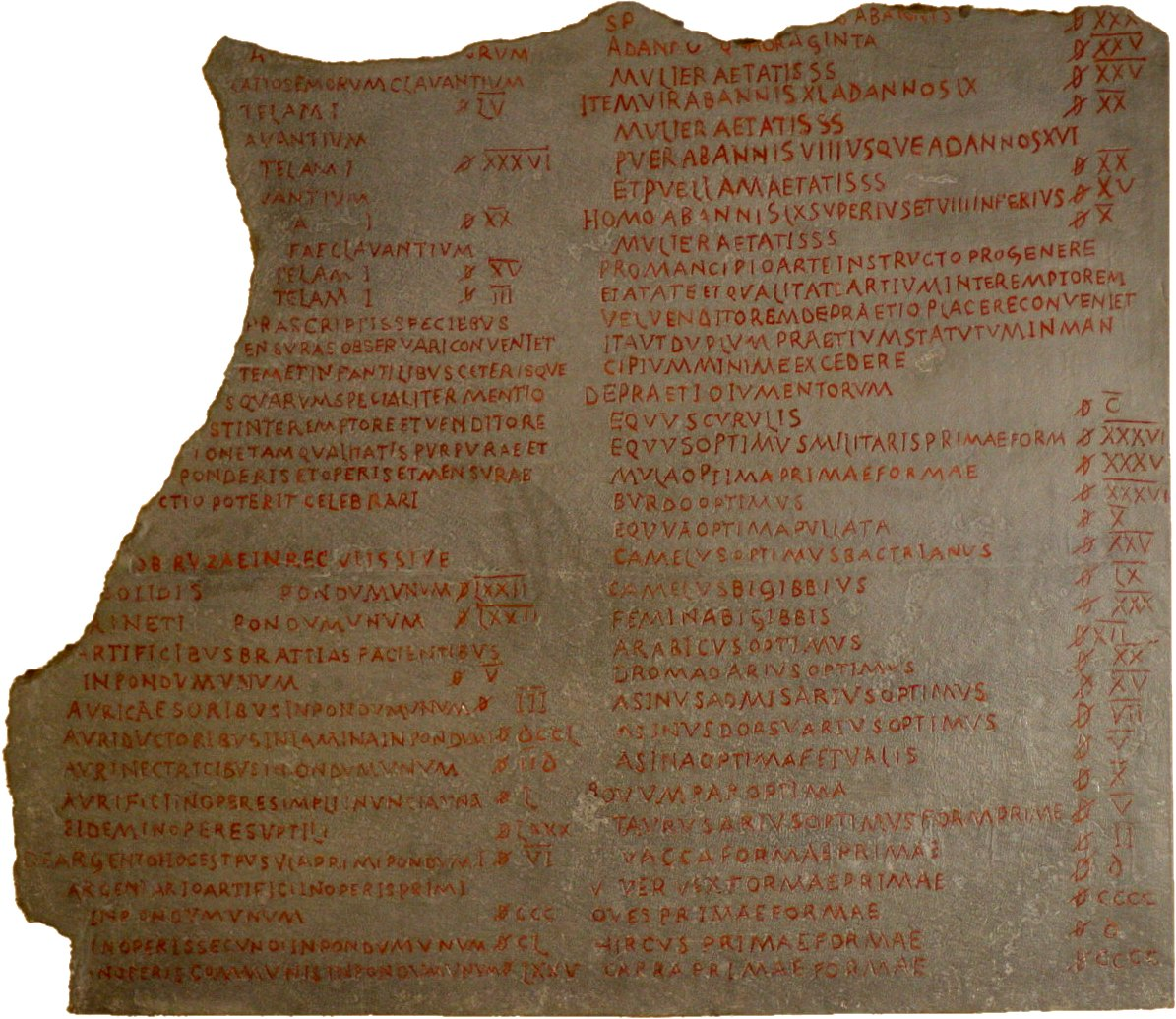
Piece of the Edict on Maximum Prices in the Pergamon Museum, Berlin

- The Edict on Maximum Prices is issued by the emperor Diocletian in 301 AD, with the prices and simulated sailing times from Nicomedia to Beirut reported to be 12 denarii for 9.9 days of duration with the ratio (price/duration) being 0.83.
- Beginning of the Diocletianic Persecutions, 303 AD.
- Five young Christians are martyred at Tyre in 303.
- Ulphianus, a Tyrian youth, is martyred, 303 AD.
- 500 Christians in Tyre get tortured and martyred in 304 AD.
- Aphian, a student of the Law school of Berytus, is martyred on April 2 c. 305 AD.
- The Governor Urbanus, shortly after Easter 307, orders the virgin Theodosia of Tyre to be thrown to the sea for conversing with Christians attending trial and refusing sacrifice.

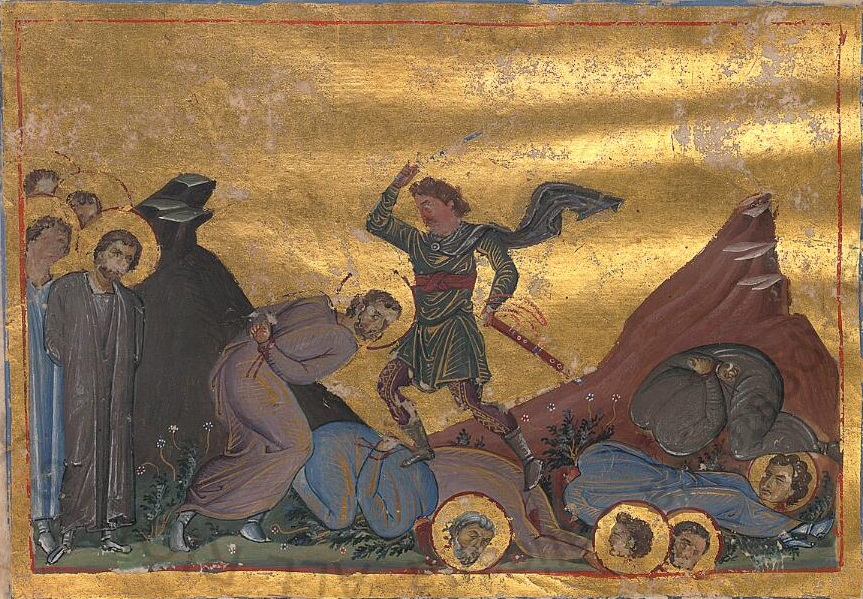
Miniature painting of the martyrdom of Pamphilus

- Pamphilus of Caesarea, a biblical scholar from a rich and honorable family of Beirut, is martyred in February 16, 309.

=== 310s ===
- Tyrannion of Tyre is martyred during the Diocletianic Persecutions, 311 AD.

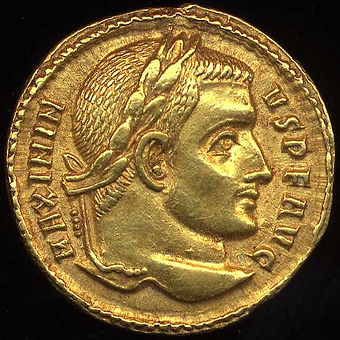
Coin of Maximinus

- Maximinus issues a rescript encouraging every city to expel its Christians. This rescript is published in Tyre on May or June, 312 AD.
- The Edict of Milan, is issued in February of 313 AD.
- In 315 AD, the cathedral of Paulinus in Tyre is inaugurated by the Bishop Eusebius, who recorded his speech and thus a detailed account of the site in his writings.

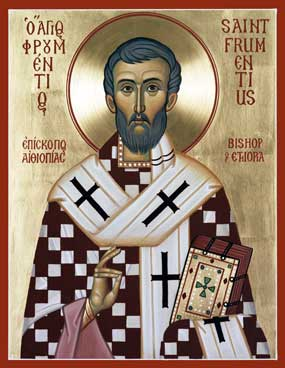
Religious imagery of Frumentius

- In 316, the Tyrian-born Frumentius and his brother, Edesius accompanied their uncle Metropius on a trip to the Kingdom of Axum by ship, the crew was massacred in a port on the Red Sea and the boys taken as slaves to the King of Axum. Frumentius and Edesius, who were both christian, gained favor with the king and his family, signaling the birth of Christianity in Ethiopia.

=== 320s ===
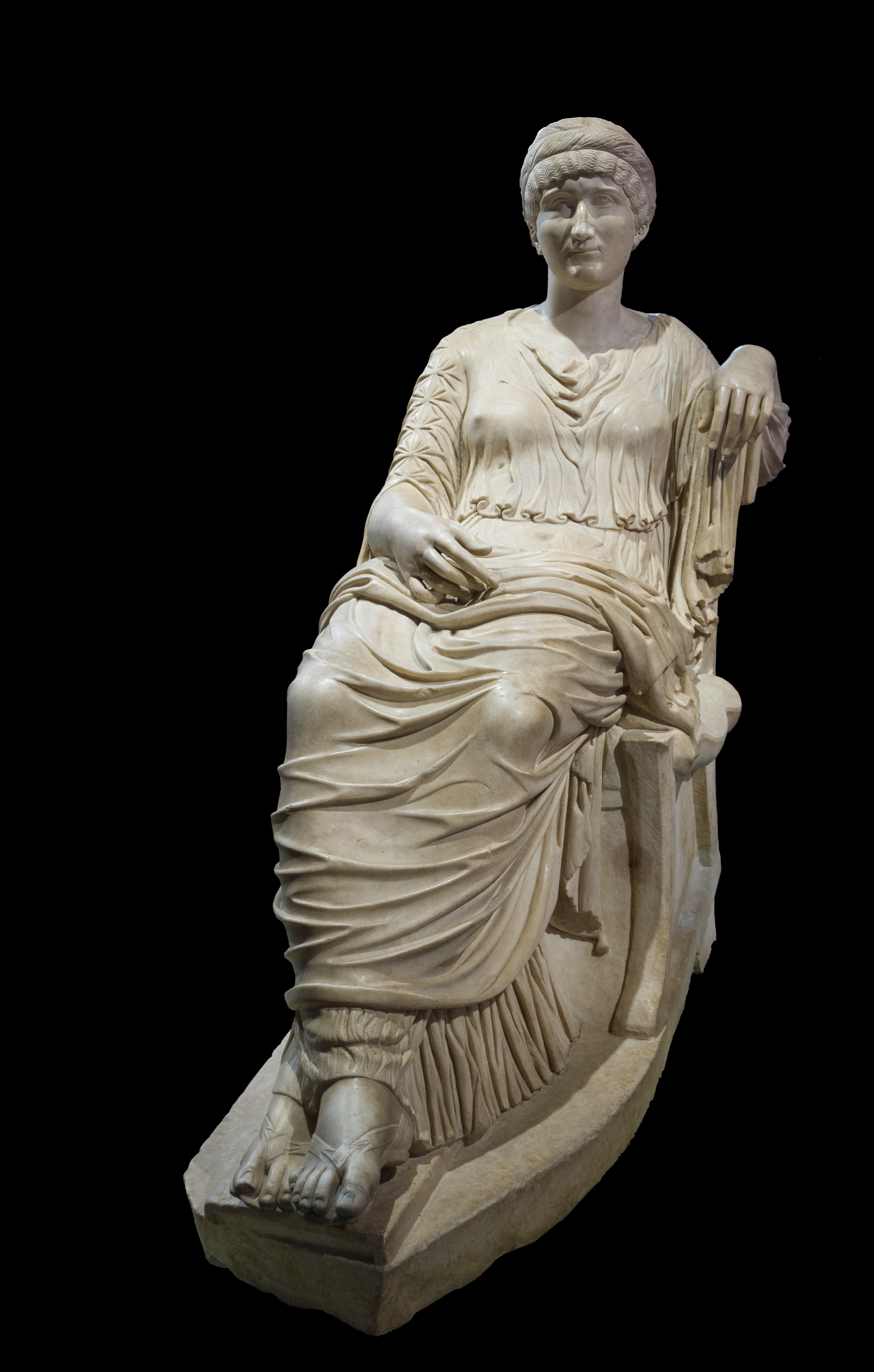
Seated statue of Helena.

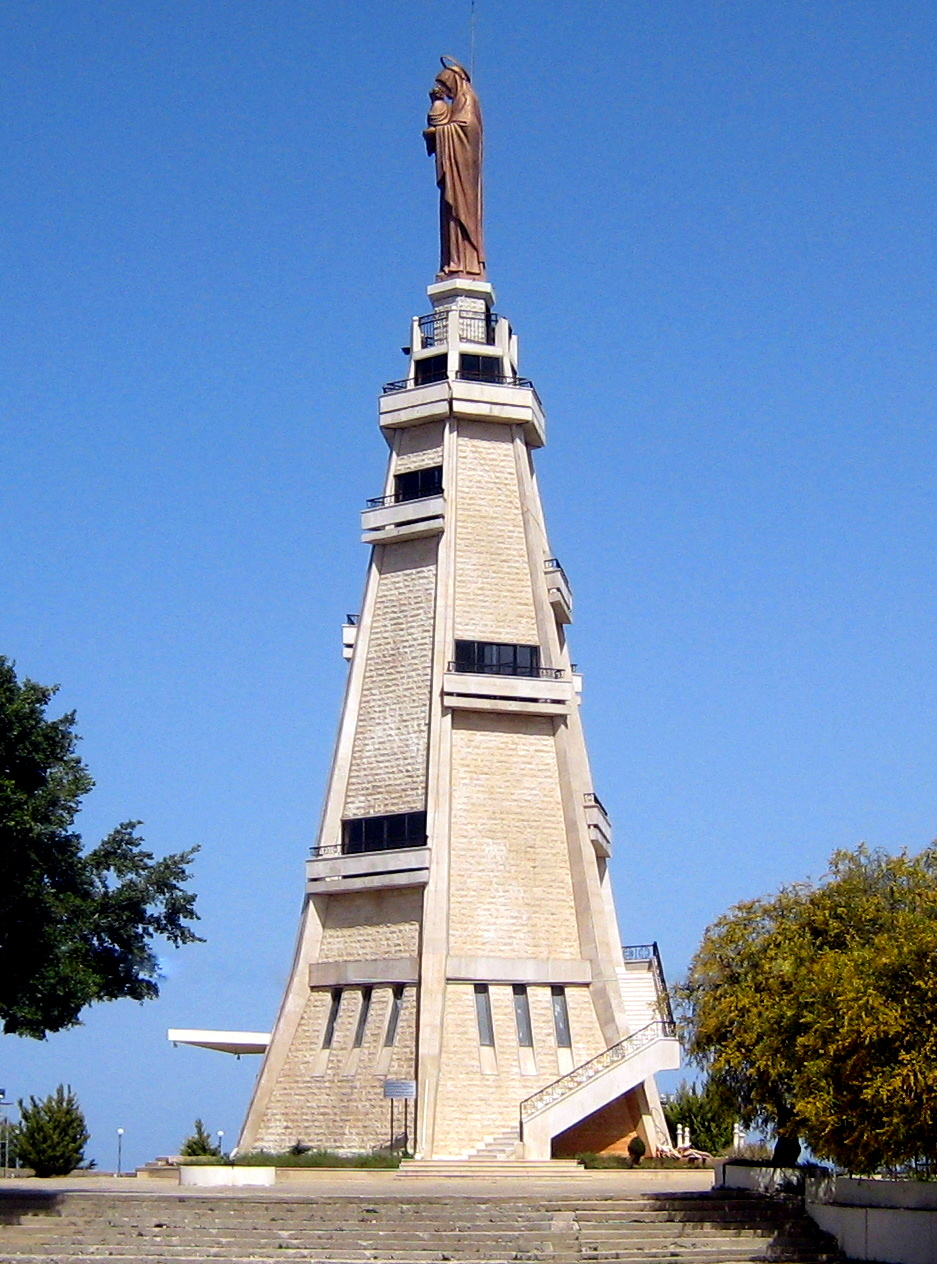
Shrine of Our Lady of Awaiting, Maghdouché.

- During the reign of Emperor Constantine, his mother, Helena of Constantinople, requests in 324 the destruction of all pagan temples and idols dedicated to Astarte. The Astarte shrine in Maghdouché was probably destroyed at that time and converted to a place of devotion to Mary.
- Paulinus of Tyre is the Patriarch of Antioch and all the East for about six months in 324 and 325.
- The First Council of Nicaea – in which ten bishops from Phoenicia attended (one of them being Zeno I, bishop of Tyre) – is convened in 325 AD.

=== 330s ===
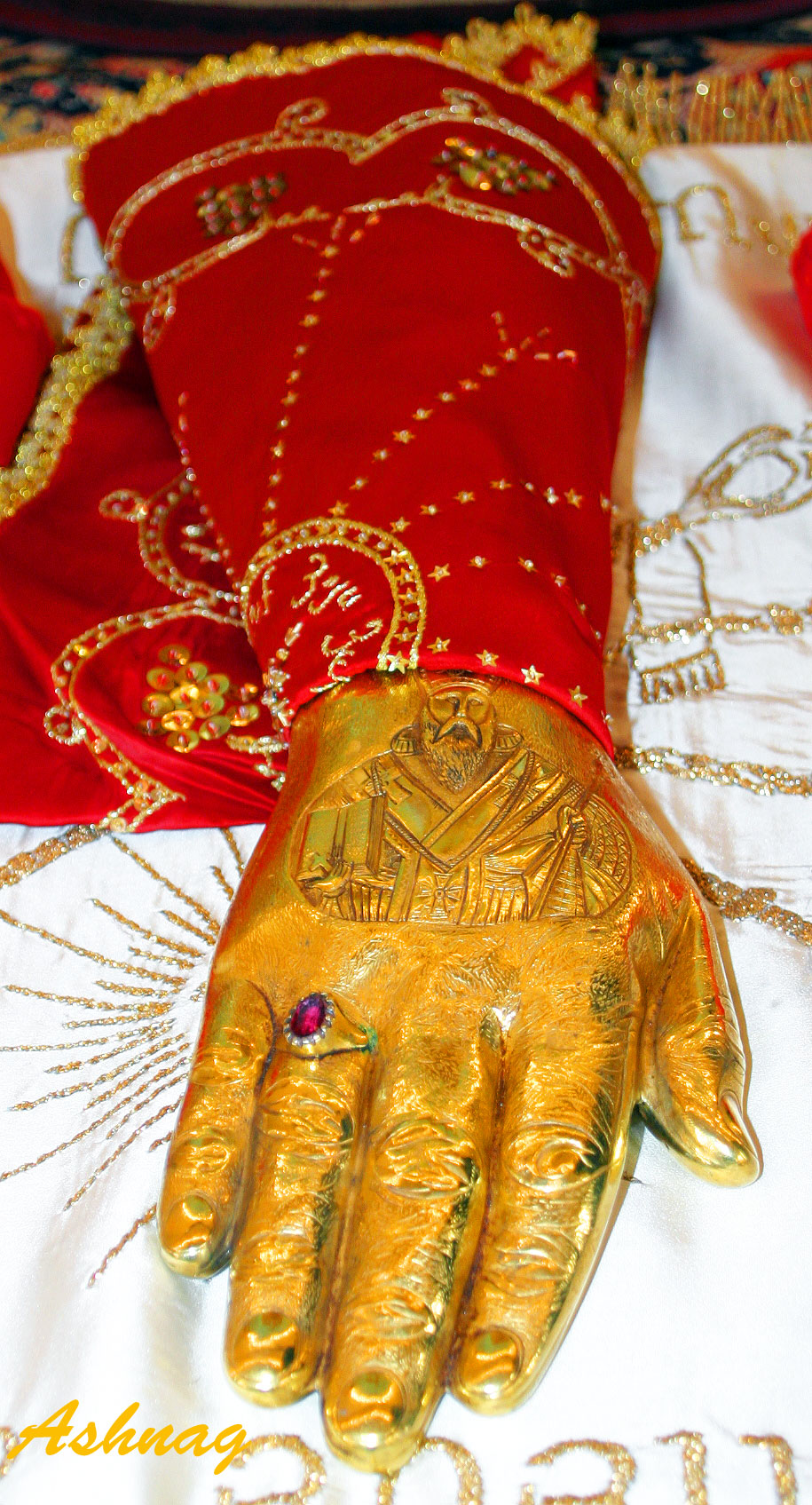
The Right Hand of Gregory the Illuminator (who died in 331 AD) in the museum of the Holy See of Cilicia at Antelias, Lebanon

- The First Synod of Tyre or the Council of Tyre (335 AD), a gathering of bishops, in which the first historically documented bishop of Tripoli, Hellanicus, took part, for the primary purpose of evaluating charges brought against Athanasius, the Patriarch of Alexandria, is called together by Emperor Constantine, with the former governor of Phoenice, Flavius Dionysius, taking charge of the council.
- Emperor Constantine is baptized by the once-bishop of Beirut, Eusebius of Nicomedia, right before his death on 22 May 337.

=== 340s ===
- Marcellinus, is attested as praeses of Phoenice in 342 AD.

=== 350s ===
- The Letter 492 of Rhetorician Libanius to Vindonius Anatolius of Beirut is written in 356, in the letter, Libanius writes that Anatolius, a native of Phoenicia, had spent some time “among us”, (i.e. in Antioch).

=== 360s ===
- In 360, Dominus the Elder, a law school professor, declines the invitation of Libanius to leave the Law School at Beirut and to teach with him at the rhetoric school of Antioch.

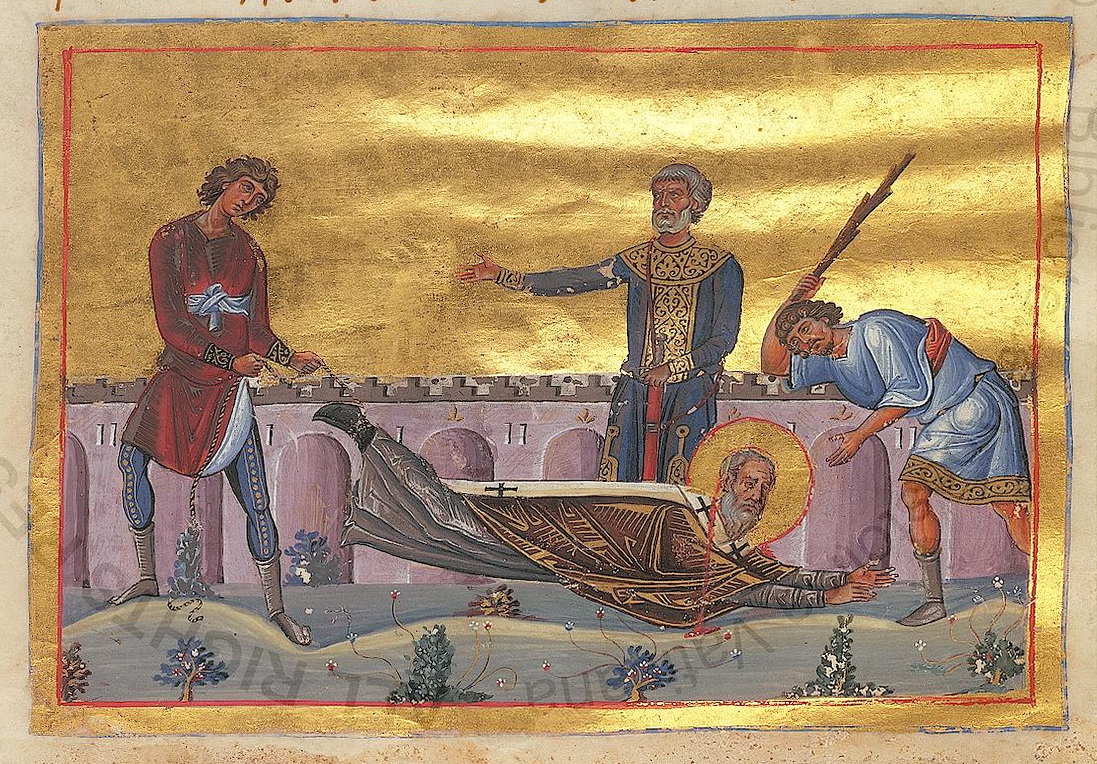
Miniature from the Menologion of Basil II of the martyrdom of Dorotheus

- Around 362 AD, Julian the Apostate burns a basilica that existed in Beirut.
- The 107-year-old Dorotheus of Tyre, bishop of Tyre, is martyred in 362 AD.
- In 365 AD, Tyre and Sidon alongside several other coastal cities are damaged by a tsunami caused by the Crete earthquake.

=== 370s ===
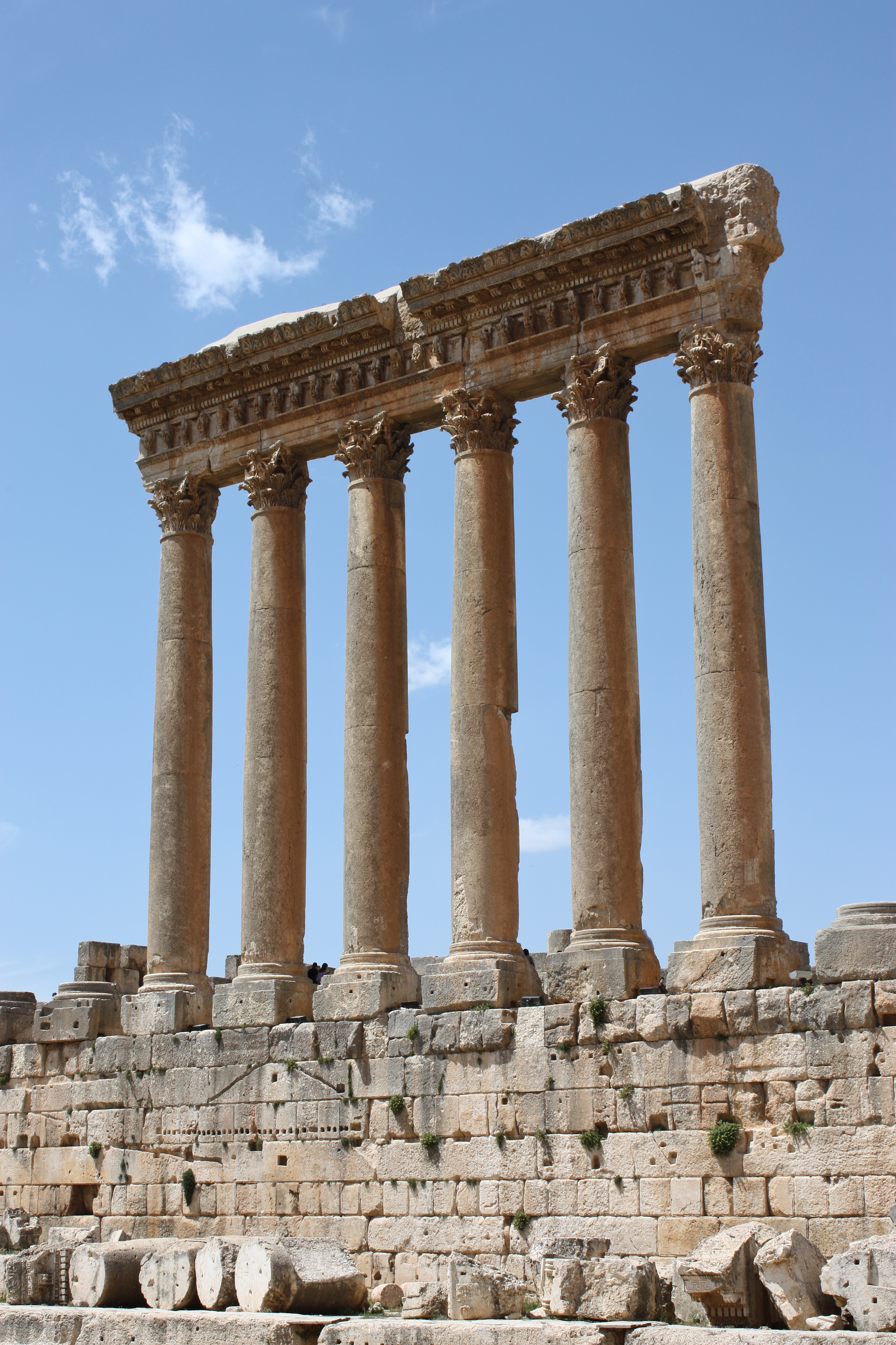
The remains of the temple of Jupiter

- The Temple of Jupiter at Baalbek, already greatly damaged by earthquakes, is demolished under Theodosius in 379 and replaced by another basilica (now lost), using stones scavenged from the pagan complex.

=== 380s ===
- The Edict of Thessalonica is issued on 27 February AD 380, making Christianity the sole official religion of the Roman empire.
- Diodorus is bishop of Tyre, 381 AD.

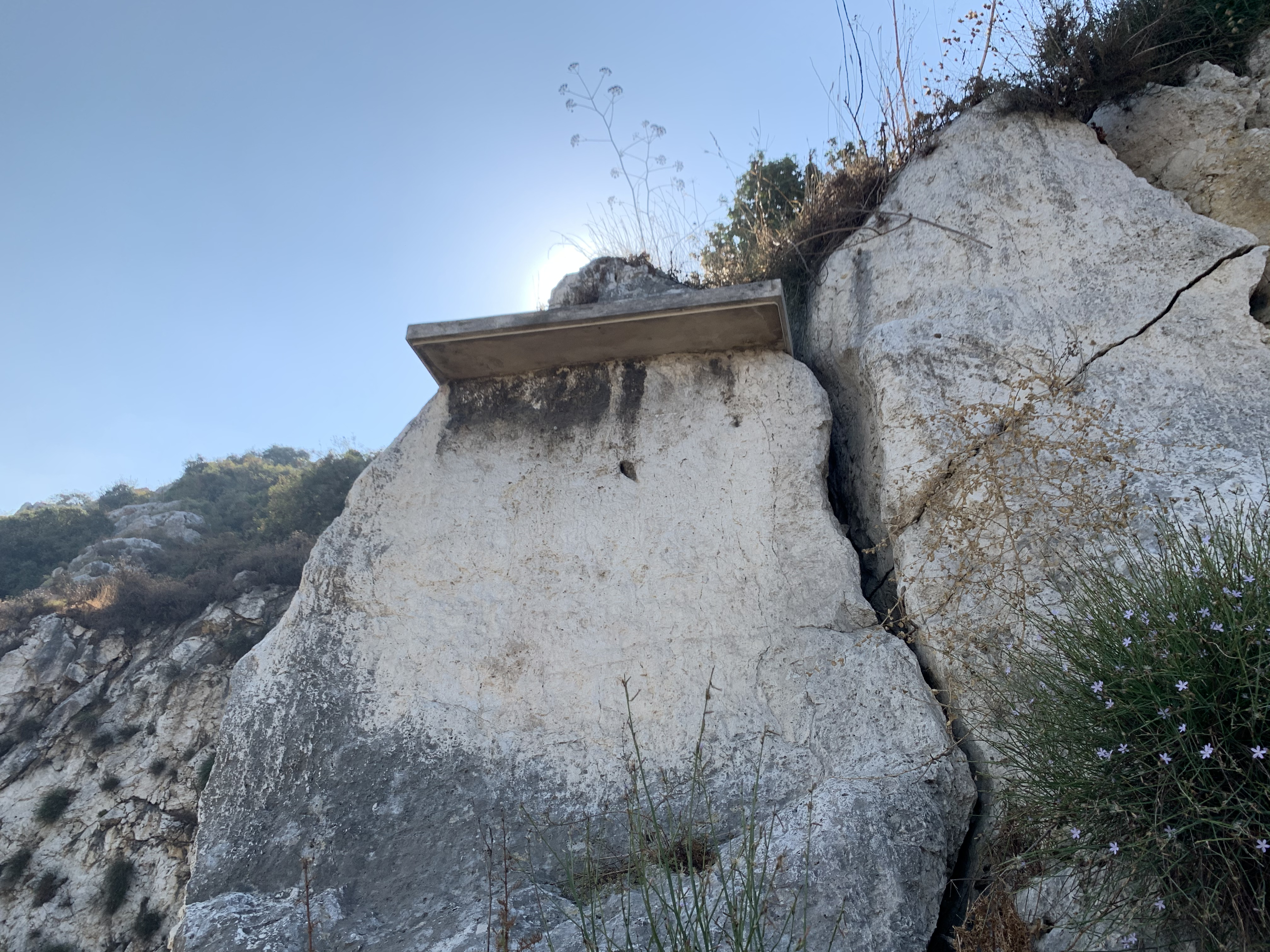
Commemorative inscription of Proculus (Inscription #11), Nahr el-Kalb. (Zoom in for epigraphic details)

- Proculus, governor of Phoenicia, is Comes Orientis between 383 and 384. During this time, his name was carved on the Commemorative stela of Nahr el-Kalb.

== Culture ==
=== Education ===
In the 4th century, the Greek rhetorician Libanius reported that the school attracted young students from affluent families and deplored the school's instructional use of Latin, which was gradually abandoned in favor of Greek in the course of the century.

Historically, Roman stationes or auditoria, where teaching was done, stood next to public libraries housed in temples. This arrangement was copied in the Roman colony at Beirut. The first mention of the school's premises dates to 350.

=== Chariot racing ===
A lead tablet, cursing the blue faction, was found in Beirut in 1929 and has now been dated to the fourth century CE.

== Religion ==
The Life of Constantine mentions a temple at Aphaca in Phoenicia, on a remote summit of Mount Libanus, being used by effeminate homosexual pagan priests, and says that this temple was destroyed by the command of Roman emperor Constantine I.

== Economy ==
During the fourth-century abundant crops of grain, wine, oil, and other products were attributed to the cities of Berytus, Byblos, Tyre, and Sarepta. Further evidence of agricultural production near Berytus is found in the fourth-century journal of the bureaucrat Theophanes, who traveled between Antioch and Egypt from 317 to 324 AD. In Berytus, Theophanes noted buying two types of bread ("pure white" for officials amongst his party and "coarse" for the servants), as well as grapes, figs, pumpkins or squashes, peaches, apricots, and cleaning supplies such as natron, bath oil, and soap. Similar purchases of bread, fresh produce, wine, and even snow to cool the wine (in Byblos) were made during each stop along the journey. They also came to Sidon on the following day and bought eggs.

== Architecture ==
- Shrine of Our Lady of Nourieh.
- Our Lady of Awaiting, Maghdouché.
- A basilica in Tyre built upon the ruins of a church by the city's bishop, Paulinus.

== People ==
=== Professors at the Berytus Law School ===
Dates of service	Names (uncertain names in italic)
Summer 356 to March / April 364	Domninus (Domnio)
October 363	Scylacius
Summer 365	Anonymous
Summer 388	Sebastianus?

=== 300s ===
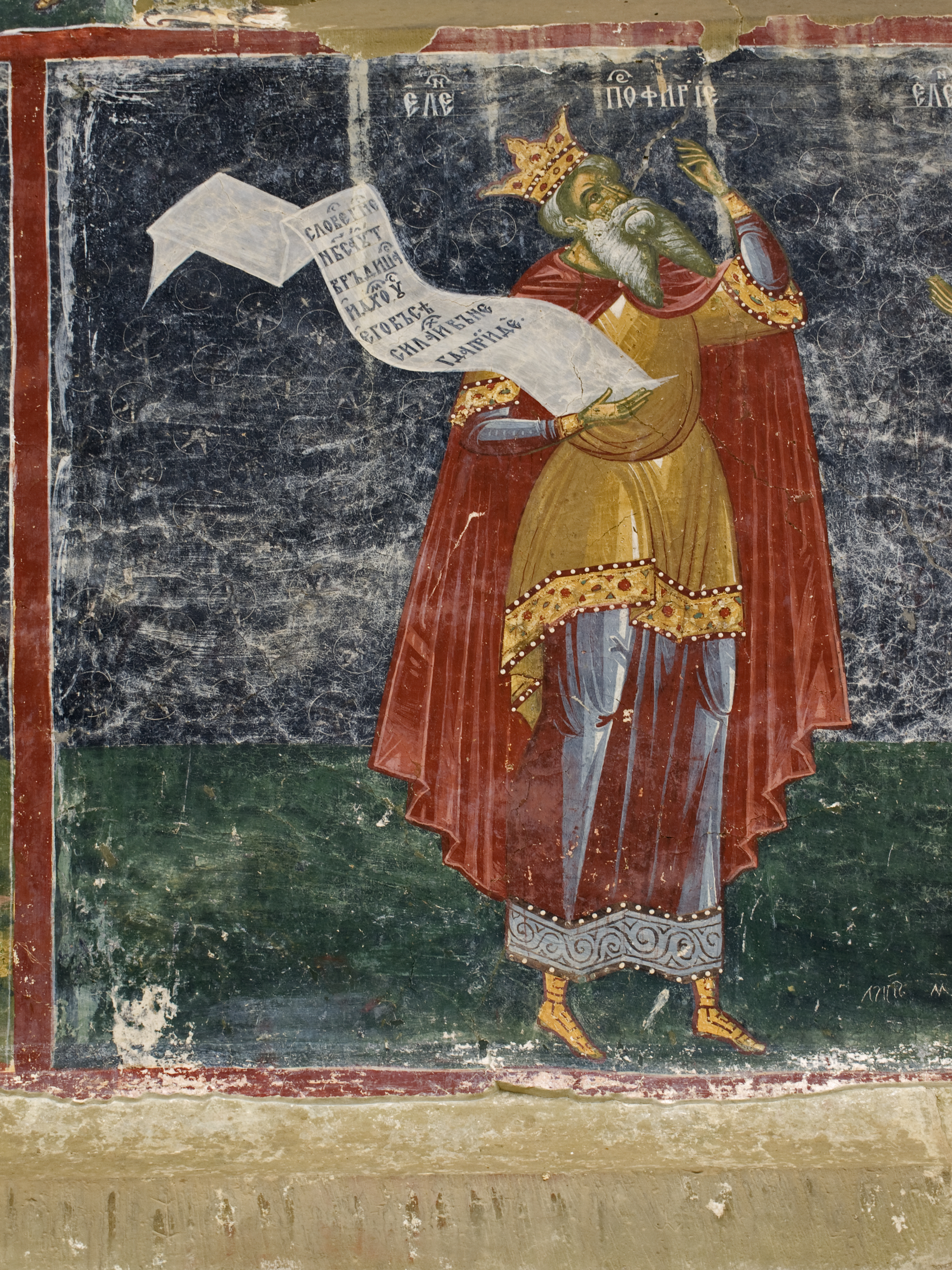
Porphyry, a detail of the Tree of Jesse, 1535, Sucevița Monastery.

- The Tyrian-born Porphyry (philosopher) dies in c. 305 AD.

=== 320s ===
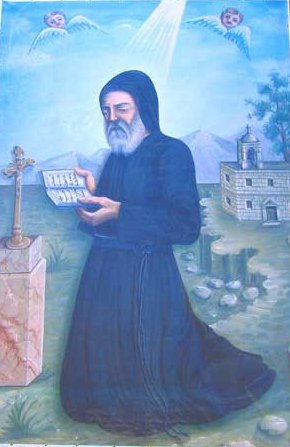
Mar Awtel, Kfarsghab, Lebanon

- Christian Maronite saint Awtel dies in 327 AD.

=== 390s ===
- Frumentius dies c. 383.

== Sources ==
- Linda Jones Hall, Roman Berytus: Beirut in late antiquity (2004)
- Attridge, Harold W.; Gōhei Hata (1992). Eusebius, Christianity, and Judaism. Detroit: Wayne State University Press. ISBN 978-0-8143-2361-8.
- Kassir, Samir; DeBevoise, M. B. (2010). Beirut. Berkeley: University of California Press. ISBN 978-0-520-25668-2.
- Sadowski, Piotr (2010). "Szkoła prawa w Bejrucie w świetle listów i mów Libaniusza" [Beirut law school in the light of letters and sayings of Libanius] (PDF). Studia Prawnoustrojowe (in Polish). 12: 203–218. Archived from the original (PDF) on 2019-08-27 – via Czasopisma humanistyczne.
- Clark, Gillian (2011). Late Antiquity: A Very Short Introduction. New York: Oxford University Press. ISBN 978-0-19-161140-7.
- Collinet, Paul (1925). Histoire de l'école de droit de Beyrouth (in French). Paris: Société Anonyme du Recueil Sirey.
- Paturel, Simone (2019-07-01), Baalbek-Heliopolis, the Bekaa, and Berytus from 100 BCE to 400 CE, BRILL, doi:10.1163/9789004400733, ISBN 978-90-04-40073-3
- Cook, Arthur Bernard (1914). Zeus: A Study in Ancient Religion. Vol. I: Zeus God of the Bright Sky. Cambridge: Cambridge University Press.
- Eißfeldt, Otto (1941). "Phoiniker (Phoinike)". Realencyclopädie der Classischen Altertumswissenschaft. Vol. Band XX, Halbband 39, Philon–Pignus. pp. 350–379.
- Simmons, Michael Bland. "Graeco-Roman Philosophical Opposition". In The Early Christian World, edited by Philip Francis Esler, 2.840–868. New York: Routledge, 2000.
