= Youakim Moubarac =

Islamologist, Orientalist and Arabist

The Reverend Youakim Moubarac
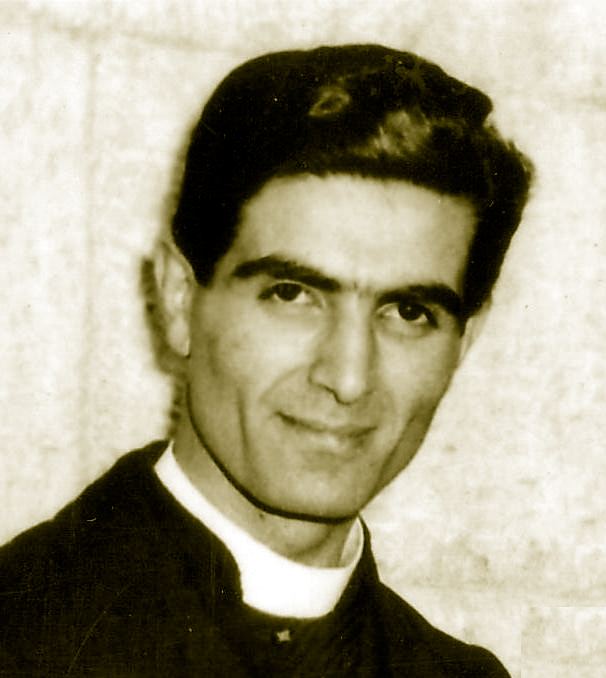
- Church: Maronite Church

Orders
- Ordination: June 29, 1947

Personal details
- Born: July 20, 1924 Kfarsghab, Lebanon
- Died: May 24, 1995 (aged 70) Montpellier, France
- Profession: Orientalist
- Education: Université Saint-Joseph, Institut Catholique de Paris

Youakim Moubarac (July 20, 1924 – May 24, 1995) was a Lebanese-French scholar and Maronite priest. An Islamologist, Arabist and disciple of the Orientalist Louis Massignon and the philosopher Louis Gardet, he worked on interfaith dialogue between Christianity and Islam, on Arab and Lebanese causes, on the unity of the Church, and on the Maronite Church's Antiochian heritage.

Born into a Maronite clerical family in Kfarsghab, Moubarac trained for the priesthood in Lebanon and France and was ordained in 1947. He served as Massignon's secretary, taught Classical Arabic at the Institut Catholique de Paris and other universities, and attended the Second Vatican Council in the Maronite delegation. From 1975 he supported Palestinian and Lebanese causes, and in the late 1980s he helped prepare the Maronite synod and began restoring the Qannoubine monastery. His writings include the multi-volume Pentalogie Islamo-chrétienne (1972) and Pentalogie antiochienne (1984).

== Biography ==
Youakim Moubarac was born in Kfarsghab, Lebanon to a Maronite clerical family. His father, Antoun, and grandfather, Youssef, were Maronite priests serving in the Kadisha Valley, a holy place in the Maronite tradition. His maternal grandfather, Nemtallah Samia, was also a priest.

=== Early life ===
After ecclesiastical studies at the Maronite Seminary of Ghazir and the Université Saint-Joseph in Beirut, Moubarac was sent to France in October 1945 by his superiors. After completing his studies at the Seminary of Saint Sulpice in Paris, he was ordained a priest on June 29, 1947, in Lebanon. In 1948, the Maronite Patriarch authorized him to continue his studies at the Institut Catholique de Paris. The same year, he was assigned to Saint-Séverin in the Latin Quarter, where he remained for 18 years.

=== Career ===
In 1951, he presented his first doctoral thesis, Abraham dans le Coran, and joined the Centre national de la recherche scientifique (CNRS) as a researcher.

From 1950 to 1962, Moubarac served as secretary to Louis Massignon. In 1959, he began teaching Classical Arabic at the Institut Catholique de Paris. Until his death he taught at several universities, including the Université catholique de Louvain in Belgium and the University of Paris IV: Paris-Sorbonne.

He took part in the Second Vatican Council between 1962 and 1965 as part of the Maronite delegation. After 1965 he promoted interfaith dialogue, and from 1975 he defended Palestinian and Lebanese causes.

From 1985, Moubarac worked on recovering the Syriac roots of the Maronite Church. Between 1987 and 1992 he lived in Lebanon and was in charge of preparing the Maronite synod. During this period he began two projects:

- In 1989 he started the restoration of the Monastery of Our Lady of Qannoubine, a Maronite monastery in the Qadisha valley that served as the seat of the Maronite Patriarch from about the 15th to the 18th century.
- In 1992 he founded the Lebanese Cooperative for Development with associates, a microcredit initiative intended to help displaced families of the Lebanese Civil War (1975–1990) resettle in their regions of origin and to discourage emigration from Lebanon.

In 1991, Pope John Paul II's decision to convene a synod in Rome for all Catholic Lebanese churches ended the synod project. In 1992, Moubarac returned to Paris and resumed his academic work.

=== Death and legacy ===
Moubarac died on May 24, 1995, in Montpellier, France. He was buried in the graveyard of the Abbaye Notre-Dame-de-Jouarre. On August 25, 2009, his remains were transferred, as he had wished, to rest beside his relatives at Mar Youssef Church in Morh Kfarsghab. A Requiem Mass in his hometown of Kfarsghab was celebrated by Nasrallah Boutros Sfeir, Patriarch of the Maronite Church, and attended by Tarek Mitri representing the President of Lebanon, Michel Suleiman.

Moubarac's work has continued to receive scholarly attention since the 2010s.

== Works ==
- 1956, Bibliographie de Louis Massignon. Réunie et classée par Y. Moubarac, Institut Français de Damas, Damascus. OCLC 61507397
- 1956, Les Noms divins dans le Coran et en épigraphie sud-sémitique, Museon, Louvain.
- 1957, Les Études d'épigraphie sud-sémitique et la naissance de l'Islam : Eléments de bibliographie et lignes de recherches, Librairie orientaliste Paul Geuthner, OCLC 60506136
- 1958, Abraham dans le Coran, Librairie philosophique J. Vrin, Paris. OCLC 1325821
- 1962, L'Islam, Casterman, Paris. OCLC 5850895
- 1963, Anthologie de la littérature arabe, selon une nouvelle translittération établie par le Cardinal Tisserant, Gedalge, Paris. OCLC 23432852
- 1963, Catéchisme pour adultes à Saint-Séverin, Casterman, OCLC 53641154
- 1963, Mémorial Louis Massignon, Sous la direction de Youakim Moubarac et des textes arabes de Ibrahim Madkour, Abd al-Rahman Badawi, Taha Hussein, etc., Dar el-Salam, Imprimerie de l'Institut Français d'Archéologie Orientale, Cairo. OCLC 20425710
- 1964, Guide de l'église Saint-Séverin (XIIIe-XVIe siècles) Deuxième édition revue avec textes en espagnol, italien, anglais et allemand, Association Philippe Néri, Paris. OCLC 80149006
- 1965, Bible, Liturgy, and Dogma, University of Notre Dame Press, Ind., Fides Publishers,OCLC 1911571
- 1965, Saint-Séverin catechism for adults, G. Chapman, London, OCLC 40209004
- 1965, Calendrier synoptique, juif, chrétien, musulman 1966, Devrue, Paris. OCLC 53685344
- 1966, I Believe in God, University of Notre Dame Press, Ind., Fides Publishers. OCLC 4174404
- 1966, Calendrier Synoptique, Juif, Chrétien, Musulman, Philippe Néri, Saint Séverin, Paris.
- 1968, Vocation islamique de Jérusalem, Al Khal Editor, Beirut. OCLC 65491009
- 1969, La Pensée chrétienne et l'Islam, des origines jusqu'a la prise de Constantinople, Sorbonne, Paris.
- 1971, Les Musulmans: consultation islamo-chrétienne, Seven Muslim intellectuals from North Africa, Egypt, Iran, and India replies to questions concerning relations with Christians., Beauchesne, Paris. OCLC 545865
- 1972, Pentalogie Islamo-chrétienne, 5 tomes :
  - tome 1 : L'œuvre de Louis Massignon, OCLC 1054570
  - tome 2 : Le Coran et la critique occidentale, OCLC 915268
  - tome 3 : L'Islam et le dialogue Islamo-Chrétien, OCLC 1032383
  - tome 4 : Les Chrétiens et le Monde Arabe, OCLC 1206343
  - tome 5 : Palestine et Arabité., OCLC 1054596. Éditions du Cénacle Libanais, Beirut.
- 1977, Recherches sur la pensée chrétienne et l'Islam dans Les Temps Modernes et à l'époque contemporaine, Université Libanaise, Beirut. OCLC 4993936
- 1975, Muhammad est-il prophète?, Louvain-La-Neuve, Université Catholique de Louvain, Faculté de théologie, OCLC 77446963
- 1982, Islam et Christianisme en dialogue (with Jean-Paul Gabus and Ali Merad), Éditions du Cerf, Paris. ISBN 978-2-204-01851-7
- 1984, Pentalogie antiochienne, Domaine Maronite, 5 tomes en 7 volumes:
  - tome 1 : Les Maronites entre l'Orient syrien et l'Occident Latin, OCLC 58616233
  - tome 2 : le Liban entre l'Islam, la France et l'arabité, OCLC 62029897
  - tome 3 : hommes et institutions, us et coutumes, proverbes et dictons, recettes et chansons, OCLC 58616202
  - tome 4 : répertoire du Liban, OCLC 58616270
  - tome 5 : Livre d'heures et de mélodies, OCLC 62029899
  - tome 6 : Livre du pain et du vin, OCLC 62029900
  - tome 7 : Livre d'images, OCLC 62029898 Publications du cénacle libanais, Beirut.
- 1986, La Pensée Chrétienne et l'Islam, Université Libanaise, Beirut.
- 1993, La chambre nuptiale du coeur, Approches spirituelles et questionnements de l'Orient syriani, Cariscript, Paris, ISBN 2-87601-228-6
- 1993, La Question libanaise dans les textes du Patriarche Sfeir, Cariscript, Paris. ISBN 978-2-87601-218-9
- 1996, al-Quds—al-qaḍīyah نقلته إلى العربية مهاة فرح الخوري, al-Markaz al-Raʼīsī, Beirut, OCLC 123310231
