= Awtel =

Christian monk and saint (250–327)

Saint Awtel
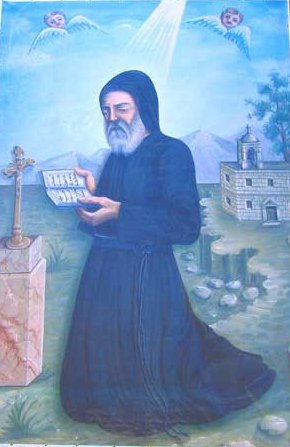
- Mar Awtel, Kfarsghab, Lebanon

Mar Awtel
- Born: 250; Magdal, Lycia, Asia Minor (modern-day, Turkey)
- Died: 327; Lycia (modern-day Turkey)
- Venerated in: Maronite Church; Eastern Orthodox; Syriac Orthodox
- Major shrine: Kfarsghab
- Feast: Jun. 3, Aug. 27
- Attributes: Monk and Hermit
- Patronage: The Village of Kfarsghab, Lebanon

Saint Awtel (also known as Mar Awtel, Mar Awtilios, Saint Aoutel, Saint Autel; died 327) was a monk in early Christianity venerated in the Middle East. He is celebrated on 3 November (by Maronites particularly), and on 9 October. A church is dedicated to him in the village of Kfarsghab in North-Lebanon where his feast day is celebrated on 3 June and 27 August.

== Life ==
There are several versions of the life of Mar Awtel. This is the version of the Maronite Sinksar along with the versions presented by Youakim Moubarac.

Saint Awtel is celebrated by the Eastern Orthodox Church, the Syriac Orthodox Church and the Maronites. His place and date of birth vary according to the sources. From an unknown place in modern Turkey for the Maronite Sinksar and born in the 3rd century AD, he is from Lycia for the other sources and he lived during the 6th century AD. His feast day varies also according to the different traditions. But most sources have corroborating deeds: he escaped a forced marriage arranged by his family, spent some time in Byzantium, delivered his fellow passengers during a severe storm, went back to his place of birth after the death of his parents and finally became a monk then a hermit.

== Version of the Maronite book of saints (Sinksar) ==
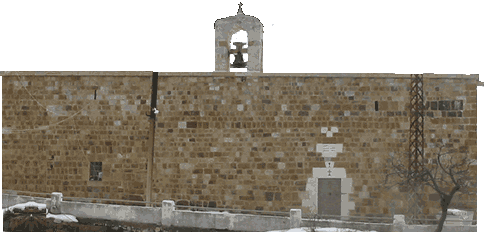
North Facade of Saint Awtel Church, Kfarsghab, Lebanon

Mar Awtel was born in mid-3rd century. As a youth he was converted to Christianity and baptised. He pledged his virginity to God but his father wanted him to marry and thereby break his pledge of celibacy. To escape he left for the city Byzantium.

While travelling on route in a boat he encountered a severe storm endangering the boat and all on board. He prayed for deliverance and the boat was saved and as a consequence those on board were converted to Christianity and baptized.

He remained for 20 years in Byzantium until his father died, whereupon he returned to his home and became a monk. He performed many miracles, one of which was the cure of a pagan man. This cure was the reason for the conversion and baptism of ten thousand pagans. After being a monk for 12 years he became a hermit until he died in 327.

== Version of Fr. Louis Cheikho ==
Father Youakim Moubarac presented the following version of Father Louis Cheikhô :.

Father Sheikho found some information about Mar Awtel in the Jacobites book of saints, in a handwritten copy belonging to Patriarch Ignatius Ephrem II Rahmani. It is also mentioned in the Bibliotheca Orientalis of Assemani and in the calendar of Çlîba the Jacobite, on the dates of October 9 and June 3.

Of all those references, he concluded that Awtel or Awtilios was born in a city called Magdal or Magdaloun in the land of Lycia in Asia Minor, in the 6th century A.D. His two parents were pagan but he was converted very young, became Christian and ran away from the paternal home to avoid marriage. He boarded and ran away to the city of Moumista (probably al-Maççîça) delivering his fellow passengers from a tempest where they would have perished. He came to Constantinople, led an ascetic life in one of its monasteries, then came back to his fatherland before spending some time in the region of Antioch, then back in Lycia. There, he converted the pagans of this region, christened them and ended his life in the desert in a monastery which he built nearby and where he lived till his death. In the calendar of the antiochian Church of al-Bîrûnî a martyr called Uwaytilyos is mentioned on the date of September 23. But it is not proven whether it is Mar Awtel or another saint.

== Additional information ==
Father Cheikho found also that the Byzantines would have called Saint Awtel, according to Fr Peeters, Agios Attaros and that they celebrated his feast day between 2 and 7 June. He delivered his fellow passengers who wanted to make him a slave by capturing him. According to the Jacobite book of saints, he remained 20 years in Constantinople, went back home after the death of his parents, spent some time in Seleucia and in Antioch before reaching Lycia. There, he joined the monastery of Mar Âba, became monk and made miracles. He left the monastery because he did not want to be elected superior. He was served in his ultimate retirement in the desert by a man whom he had cured from the bite of a snake.

== Saint Awtel's Church, Kfarsghab ==
=== The history ===
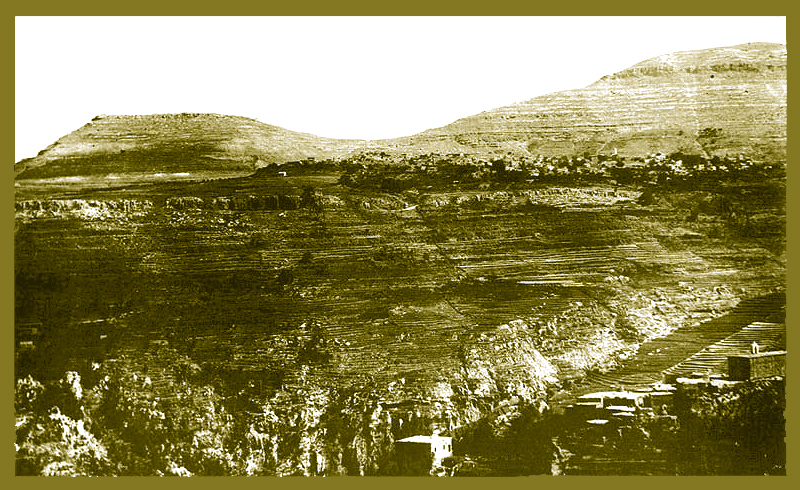
Bottom right, the commanding location of Saint Awtel Church in 1896

Saint Awtel's church in Kfarsghab, Lebanon is the only church in the country dedicated to this saint. It is built on a rocky promontory presenting steep faces of around 30 meters altitude, commanding the approaches through the Qadisha Valley. Its location is clearly that of a fortified place, echoing the etymological meaning of Kfarsghab#Etymology, "the fortified village". The first mention of Saint Awtel Church is a date for its renovation in 1470.

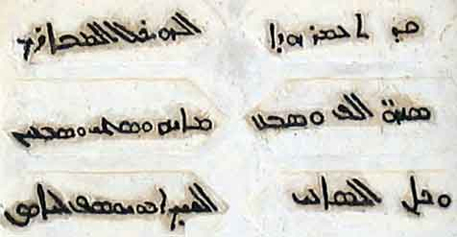
Engraving commemorating the extension of Mar Awtel Church in 1776

Between 1776 and 1778, the church was extended to accommodate the increasing population of Kfarsghab. The achievement of this renovation is attested by a Garshuni stone inscription in Syriac placed over the main entrance that reads as follow:

- "Achieved the construction of this blessed temple

year one thousand seven hundred and seventy six by the zeal of Sheikh Abou Youssef Elias".

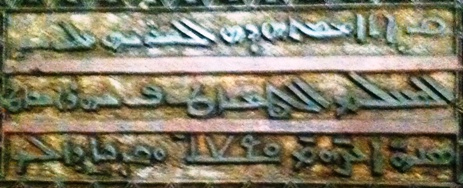
Left Side of the wooden Inscription from 1795

The Church is separated into two sections: men in front and women in the rear. And in 1795, an intricate woodwork was completed to separate the two sections. It was commemorated by a Garshuni inscription in Syriac Serta Script that reads as follows:

- Left Side:

"This woodwork was achieved by the hand of Master Dumiati [from Damietta, Egypt] in the month of February of year 1795 and that was"

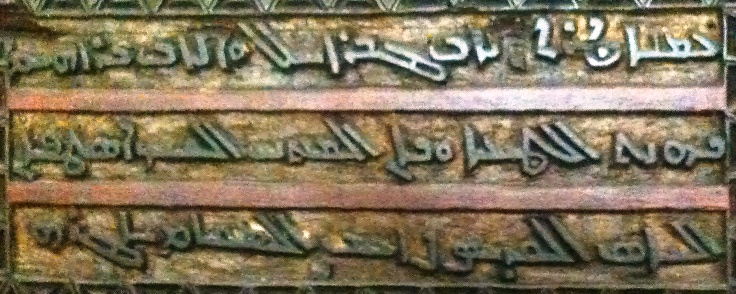
Right Side of the wooden Inscription from 1795

- Right Side:

"under the supervision of Father Jibrayeel and Father Brahim priests of the village and the donor was Sheikh Estephan Elias. [May] the Saint patron of the location reward him".

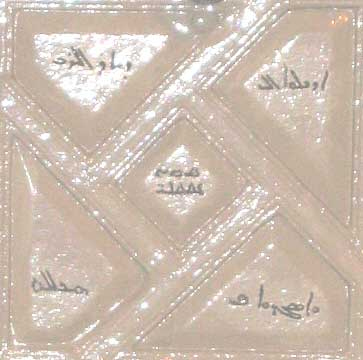
Door Engraving from 1882

In 1882, the church underwent renovation that was commemorated by engraving on the main entrance door in a mix of Garshuni and Arabic as follows:

- "Enter into the domain of the Lord

painted in year 1882

and bow in his temple".

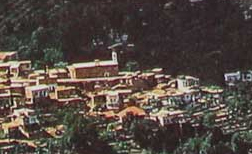
The modern bell tower to the West - 1966

In the 1950s, A modern bell tower in white stone and red tiles was added over the women entrance to the west. It was quite different from the style of the church. Eventually, it was dismantled in the 1980s restoring the architecture to its origin.

In the 1960s, a painting was commissioned to Saliba Douaihy, a young but already established Lebanese artist. This painting of Saint Awtel could be still seen over the altar inside the church.

In the 2000s, the square around the church was renovated and embellished in old stone reflecting the beauty of the architecture and the majesty of the site.

=== The Architecture and style ===
The Church layout is that of old small Maronite churches, with a single apse and a single nave typical of the 12th and 13th centuries Maronite churches. The interior is divided according to Patriarch Estephan El Douaihy’s standard plan with minor differences due to the small size of the church.

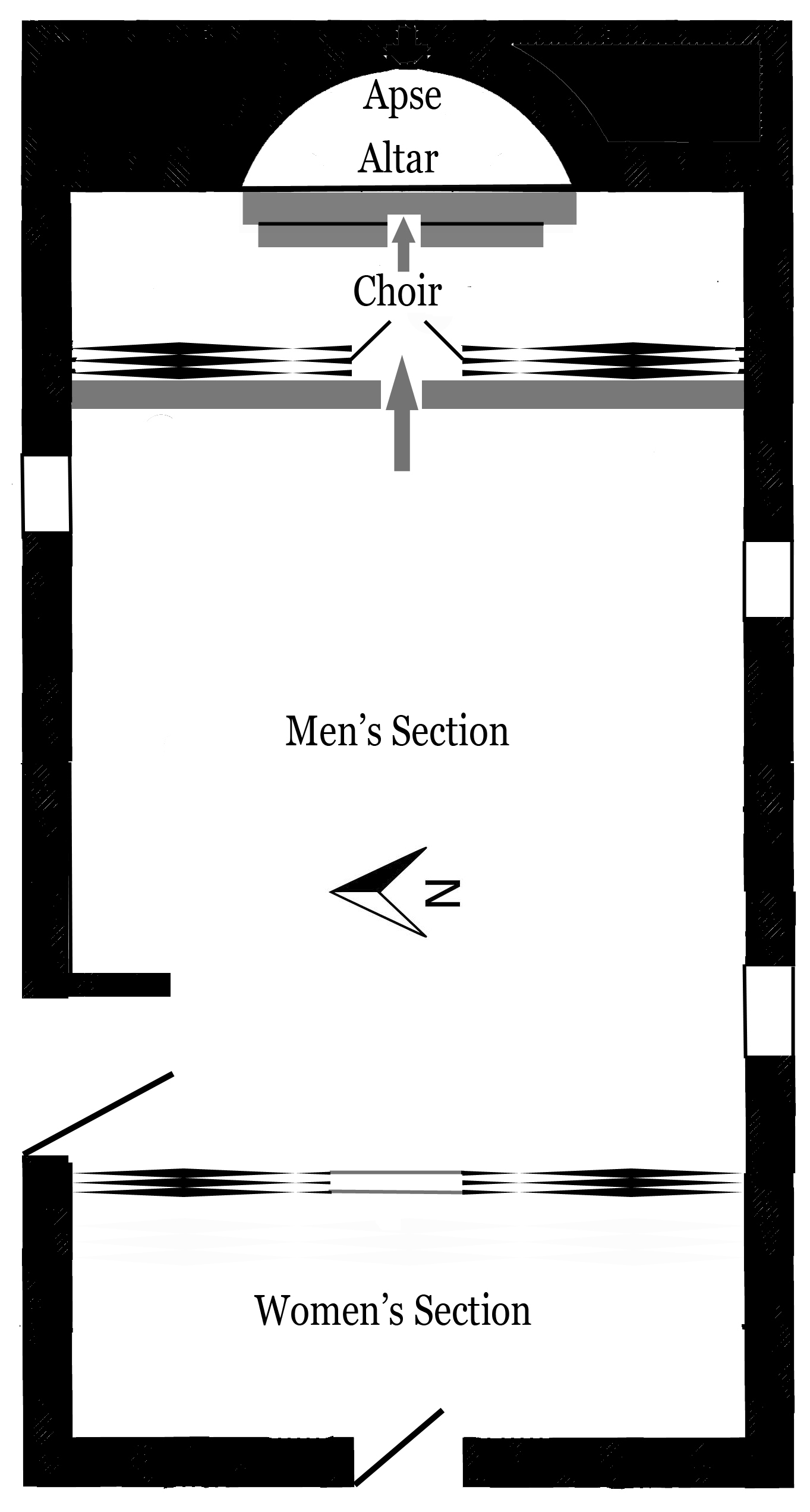
St Awtel Church Layout

A plain rectangular shape is terminated at its Eastern side by a semicircular half-domed apse. The apse's vault is ornamented with paintings of angels/cherubim on a light blue background. The altar, made of white marble, is centred into the apse and pushed into its wall. The icon representing Saint Awtel is hanging above the altar in the middle of the apse. The altar is separated by few steps from the chancel, which in turn is separated from the nave by other few steps and an iron parapet.

The nave is roofed by a series of crossed vaults. It is divided by an intricate wooden separation into two sections: the one in front reserved for men and the rear reserved for women. Each section has two ranks of natural wooden benches and its own thick wooden door. The wooden divider is a piece of delicate art and we know from the inscription commemorating its consecration that it was the work of a skilled artisan from Damietta, Egypt, a city still known today for its excellent wood artisans.

A white coating covers the inside walls. Natural light comes through two narrow higher windows on the Southern wall and one lower window on the North wall.

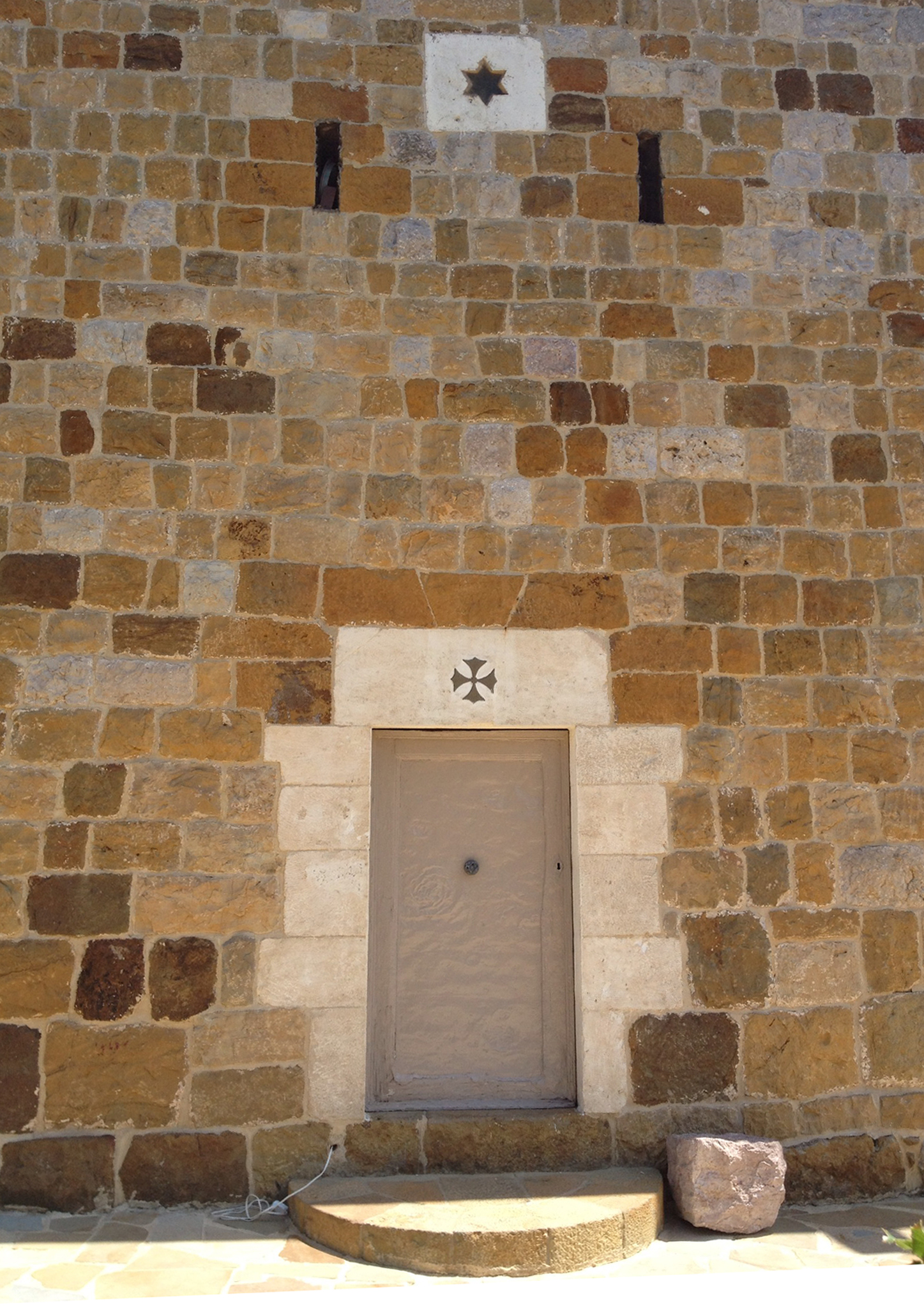
Women's Entrance to the West

Three higher apertures can be seen on the western wall above the women's entrance: two rectangular narrow apertures and above them in the middle the third aperture made in white stone in the shape of a hexagram, a six-pointed star. The Women's door is encased into atypical heavy slabs of white limestone, and bears on the upper slab an unusual cross. The shape of the cross doesn't figure in the Maronite crosses tradition. It is a combination between a coptic cross and an Occitan cross. The Occitan cross is attributed to Raymond IV of Toulouse, whose family reigned in the county of Tripoli during the Crusades from 1109 till 1289 AD. Kfarsghab was administratively part of the county of Tripoli, which could be an explanation of the origin of this unusual cross.

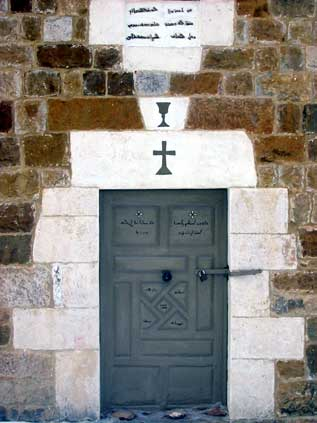
The main entrance of Mar Awtel church built on the ruins of a pagan temple

The men's door is also encased in heavy slabs of white limestone. The upper stone bears an engraving of a simple graded cross. A smaller stone has a chalice engraved on it. Then, an engraved white limestone plate tops the whole commemorating the extension of the church in 1776. The door is of heavy oak wood, engraved with biblical verses and a date of renovation in 1882.

The flat roof and the roughly hewn stone of the outside walls give the church an aspect of simplicity and austerity. The bell tower situated at the northern edge of the roof slightly to the left of the main entrance is the example of this minimalistic style as it is formed by a simple stone arch housing a medium size cast iron bell.

The church is surrounded by a vast square on the Northern and Western sides, cobbled in natural stone. The square is delimited by a natural stone parapet.

== See also ==
- The village of Kfarsghab, Lebanon
- 4th century in Lebanon
