= Our Lady of Awaiting =

Melkite Greek Catholic Marian shrine in Maghdouché, Lebanon

Coordinates: 33°31′41″N 35°22′48″E

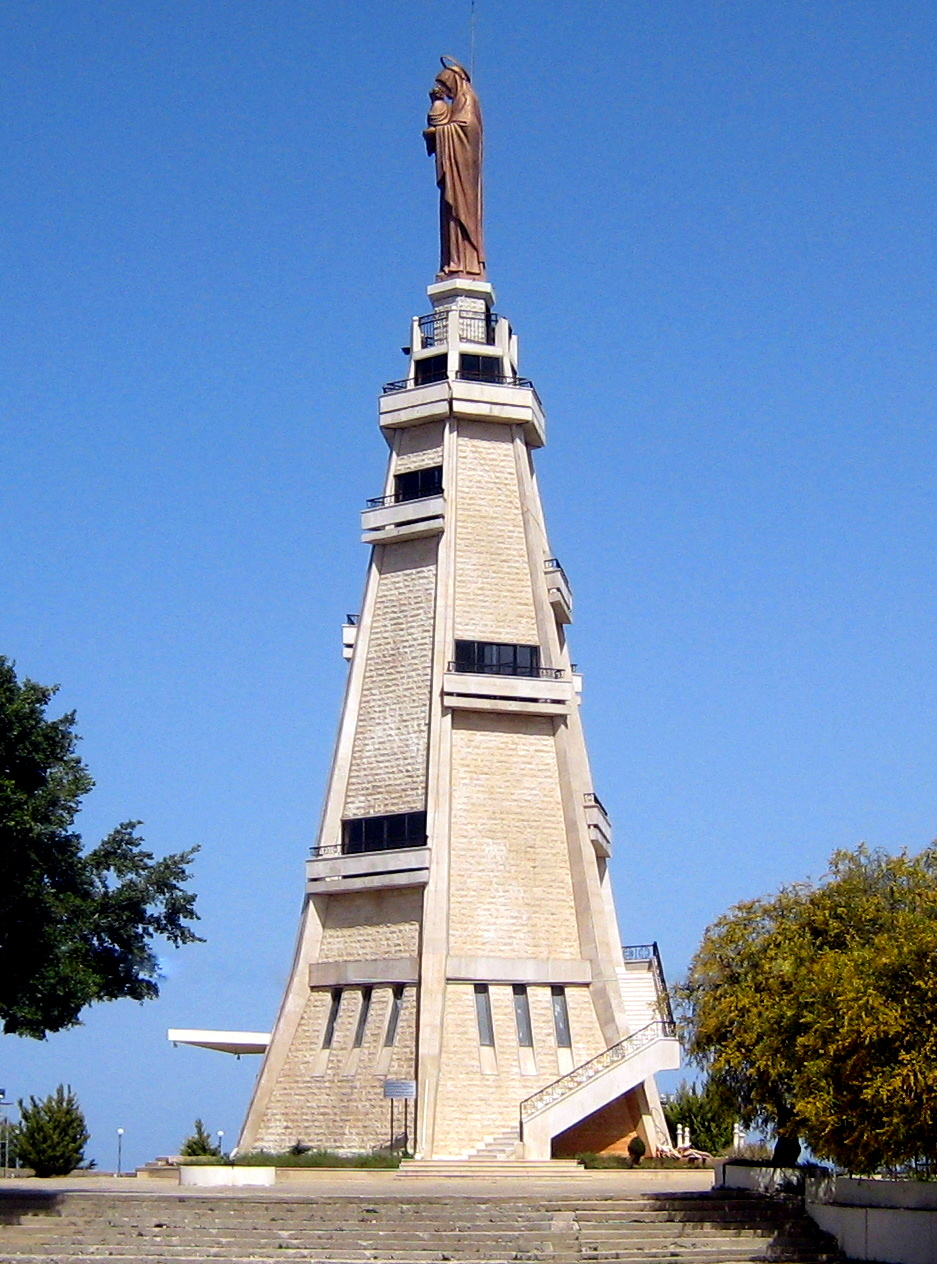
.

Our Lady of Mantara is a Melkite Greek Catholic Marian shrine in Maghdouché, Lebanon, discovered on 8 September 1721 by a young shepherd. The grotto, which according to a legend dates to ancient times, was subsequently cared after by Monsignor Eftemios Saïfi, Melkite Catholic bishop of the Melkite Greek Catholic Archeparchy of Sidon. The shrine consists of a tower crowned with the statue of the Virgin and Child, a cathedral, a cemetery and a sacred cave believed to be the one where the Virgin Mary rested while she waited for Jesus while he was in Tyre and Sidon. Since its discovery, it has been steadily visited by families particularly each year on the occasion of the feast of the Nativity of Mary on 8 September.

== History ==
=== Ancient era ===
Many historians agree that the devotion to the Virgin Mary in Lebanon replaced the Phoenician worship of Astarte. Temples and shrines to Astarte were converted to Christian places of worship, honoring the Virgin. This is also true in Maghdouché where within the vicinity of Our Lady of Awaiting are the remains of a shrine to Astarte.

=== Middle Ages ===
During the reign of Emperor Constantine, his mother, Saint Helena of Constantinople, requested in 324 the destruction of all pagan temples and idols dedicated to Astarte. The Astarte shrine in Maghdouché was probably destroyed at that time and converted to a place of devotion to the Holy Mother.

Since the early Christian era, the inhabitants of Maghdouché have venerated the cave where the Virgin Mary is said to have rested while she waited for her son, Jesus to finish preaching in Sidon. Saint Helena asked the Bishop of Tyre to consecrate a little chapel at the cave in Maghdouché. She sent the people of Maghdouché an icon of the mother and child and some altar furnishings. Historians believe that Saint Helena asked the people to name the chapel, and they named it "Our Lady of Awaiting" because it was there that the holy mother waited for her son. Mantara is derivative of the Semitic root ntr, which means “to wait."

Saint Helena provided funds from the imperial treasury for the maintenance of the chapel. The funding continued for three centuries of Byzantine rule in Phoenicia until Khalid ibn al-Walid defeated Emperor Heraclius at the Battle of the Yarmuk. While the caliph Omar, who became ruler of Jerusalem, was a pious and humble man, sparing Christendom's holiest shrines and being tolerant of his Christian subjects, the Arab rulers of the rest of Byzantium were less tolerant of the Christians, especially in the maritime cities of Tyre, Sidon, Beirut, Byblos, and Tripoli. After the majority of the Sidonians converted to Islam to receive promised privileges and immunities, the people of Maghdouché withdrew to higher elevation up Mount Lebanon. The caliphate had recognised the Christians of Mount Lebanon as autonomous communities, paying a fixed tax. Before abandoning their village, they concealed the entrance to the cave of Our Lady of Awaiting with stones, earth and vines. The people left the village through obscure mountain paths to the strongholds of Christian Lebanon. The legend of Our Lady of Awaiting was passed down to the exiled generations of Maghdouché for one thousand years.

The people of Maghdouché did not return to their ancestral home despite the arrival of the Crusaders in Sidon. The Crusaders spent most of the 12th and 13th centuries in the shadow of Maghdouché without ever suspecting the sacred cave's existence even though they built a small fort, called La Franche Garde, within meters of the hidden entrance to the cave.

=== Modern era ===
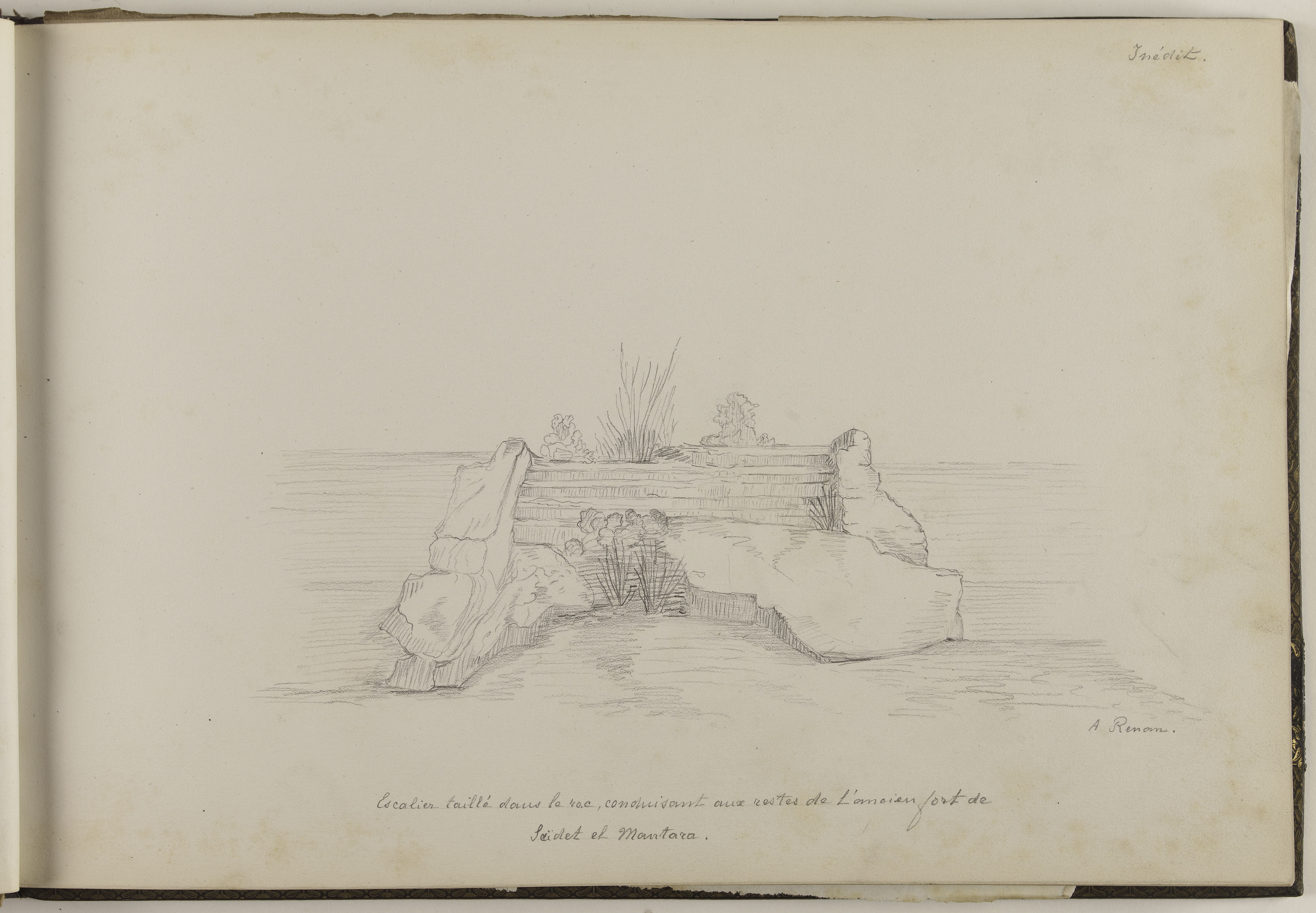
Ary Renan's sketch of a staircase carved into the rock leading to the remains of the ancient fort of Saydet el Mantara

The people of Maghdouché only returned to their ancestral village during the reign of the Druze Prince Fakhreddin II (1572-1635). The prince, who was considered a tolerant and enlightened ruler of his day and age, believed in equality amongst the diverse religious followers of his Lebanon. To demonstrate this equality, he appointed a Maronite Catholic as Prime Minister, a Muslim as Minister of the Interior, a Druze as Army Commander and a Jew as Finance Minister. His reign was a rare example of non-sectarianism, and it soon became the most prosperous principality in the Ottoman Empire.

It was not easy to locate the sacred cave even though the men of Maghdouché worked for hundreds of years near the grotto, pulling down the stones of the Crusader fort for building material for their new homes. The cave was finally rediscovered on 8 September 1721 by a young shepherd when one of his goats fell in a well-like opening in the porous limestone. Wanting to save his goat, the shepherd made a rope from vine twigs, tied it to a tree, and descended into the hole, but the rope broke and he fell. When his eyes became accustomed to the darkness of the grotto, the boy saw a soft glimmer of a golden object, which turned out to be Saint Helena’s icon of the Mother and Child. The boy climbed up the stone walls and ran to the village to tell his discovery.

== Pilgrimage site ==
Ever since the rediscovery, the cave of Our Lady of Awaiting has been open to the public. It has become a major pilgrimage site in the Lebanon. The adjacent hilltop where Jesus and Mary had once stood is now Sidon's Greek Catholic cemetery. Grand festivities are held each year on September 8 to commemorate the rediscovery of the sacred cave.

Near the sacred cave, the people of Magdhdouché built a cathedral and a modern tower crowned with a bronze statue of the Virgin and Child. The tower offers pilgrims panoramic views of Sidon, the Mediterranean, and the lush hills, valleys and citrus groves of Lebanon.

== See also ==
- 4th century in Lebanon
