= Ulphianus =

Levantine Christian martyr (died 305)

Saint Ulphianus
- Born: Tyre, Lebanon
- Died: 305; Caesarea, Palestine
- Canonized: Pre-congregation
- Feast: 3 April

Saint Ulphianus (or Ulpian, Vulpian, Vulpianus. died 305) was a Christian martyr in Palestine. His feast day is 3 April.

== Baring-Gould's account ==
Sabine Baring-Gould (1834–1924) in his Lives Of The Saints wrote under April 3,

S. ULPIAN, M. (A.D. 304)
[Roman Martyrology. Authority;—Eusebius in his History of the Martyrs of Oelsetine, c.5. contemporary and perfectly trustworthy]

ULPIAN or VULPIAN was a youth of Tyre, who was cast into the sea in a leathern sack together with a dog and an asp, which were sown up in it with him.

== Monks of Ramsgate account ==
The monks of St Augustine's Abbey, Ramsgate wrote in their Book of Saints (1921),

Ulpian (St.) M. (April 3)
(4th cent.) One of the victims at Caesarea in Palestine of the persecution under Diocletian and his colleague Galerius (A.D. 305). He was sewn up in a sack together with a live dog and a serpent, and so thrown into the sea.

== Butler's account ==
The hagiographer Alban Butler (1710–1773) wrote in his Lives of the Fathers, Martyrs, and Other Principal Saints under April 3,

St. Ulpian, M.

HE was a young zealous Christian of Tyre, who, being encouraged by the example of St. Apian and other martyrs at Cæsarea, boldly confessed Christ before the cruel judge Urbanus. The enraged governor ordered him to be first severely scourged, and then tortured on the rack; his joints being thereby dislocated, his bones broken, and his body so universally sore, that the slightest touch occasioned excessive pain. He was sewed up after this in a leather bag, with a dog and an aspic, laid on a cart drawn by black bulls, carried to the sea-side, and cast into the waves. See Eusebius on the Martyrs of Palestine, ch. 5

== See also ==
- 4th century in Lebanon

== Sources ==
- Baring-Gould, Sabine (1897), The Lives Of The Saints, vol. 4, April, London: J. C. Nimmo
- Butler, Alban (1833), The Lives of the Fathers, Martyrs, and Other Principal Saints, vol. 1, Coyne This article incorporates text from this source, which is in the public domain.
- St. Augustine's Abbey, Ramsgate (1921), The Book of saints : a dictionary of servants of God canonized by the Catholic Church, London: A. & C. Black, ltd. This article incorporates text from this source, which is in the public domain.
