= Maghdouché =

Maghdouché مغدوشة Maghdoushah
- Municipality
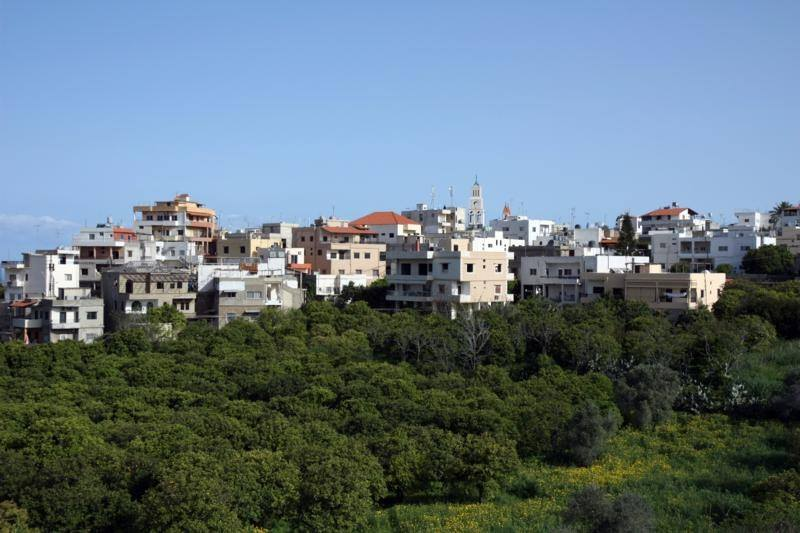

- Location in Lebanon
- Coordinates: 33°31′20″N 35°23′9″E
- Country: Lebanon
- Governorate: South Governorate
- District: Sidon District

Government
  - Type: Mayor–council
  - Body: Maghdouche municipality
- Highest elevation: 230 m (750 ft)
- Time zone: UTC+2 (EET)
  - Summer (DST): UTC+3 (EEST)
- Dialing code: 00961 (7) Landline

Maghdouché (Levantine Arabic: مغدوشة, romanized: Maghdūsheh) is a municipality in the South Governorate of Lebanon. It is located 50 km south of Beirut and 8 km southeast of Sidon. The village lies 3 km inland from the Mediterranean, occupying a hill with elevation ranging between 200 and 229 meters above sea level.

== Demographics ==
In 2014, Christians made up 99.26% of registered voters in Maghdouché. 78.48% of the voters were Greek Catholics and 14.12% were Maronite Catholics.

Maghdouché has a permanent population of 8,000 inhabitants, the majority of whom are Melkite Greek Catholics and few Maronite Catholics. The population of the town doubles when the expatriates return to spend their summer vacations in their ancestral home.

== Economy ==
Maghdouché's main industry is agriculture. The town produces grapes and citrus fruits, especially oranges. The town is famous for its orange-blossom water. In April 2006, USAID funded a $195,000 cooperative of flower blossom and rose water production center, which will serve more than 950 farmers in Maghdouche area.

== History ==
The name, Maghdouché, originates from the Syriac word, which means "crop collectors." It is also derived from the Syriac word Kidsh and its derivatives (Kadisho, Kadishat, Makdosho). In Hebrew, it means "holy" or "saintly." According to Christian belief, when Jesus came to Sidon, the Virgin Mary who accompanied him, waited for him at the top of the hill where Maghdouché is located today. She spent the night in a cave that came to be known as Mantara, or the "Awaiting." Emperor Constantine the Great responded to St. Hélène's request and transformed the cave into a sanctuary for the Virgin. He erected a tower in honor of the Virgin. The tower collapsed during the earthquake of 550. Later, King Louis IX erected a watching tower in the same location. The Mantara cave was once again discovered accidentally by a shepherd in 1726. An icon of the Virgin was also discovered, and it was of Byzantine style, dating back to the 7th or to the 8th century. Since then, the cave has been transformed into a place of pilgrimage for all the Lebanese confessions. In 1860, the Greek Catholic Church became the owner, and transformed the cave into a sanctuary in 1880.

Ernest Renan visited Maghdouché during his mission to Lebanon, (described in Mission de Phénicie (1865-1874)) and he visited the caves Sayyidet el-Mantara and Mogharet el-Magdoura.

In 1875 Victor Guérin found it to be a village with 300 Greek Catholic inhabitants. He also noted the caves, Saïdet el-Manthara and Merharet el-Makdoura.

At the beginning of the sixties, under the auspices of Mgr Basile Khoury, the architect Varoujan Zaven designed and executed a hexagonal chapel topped by a 28-meter tower in a conical shape to support an 8.5-meter one-piece bronze statue of the Virgin Mary holding Jesus in her arms, of his own design as well, realized by Italian artist Pierrotti in Pietra Santa. The design and supervision of the project were both a donation on behalf of the architect. Our Lady of Mantara is considered the protectress of children, and many baptisms are celebrated at the sanctuary.

In May 1985 Amal occupied Maghdouché, driving out the Lebanese Forces and expelling many of the Christian residents. Eighteen months later, on 24 November 1986, a coalition of fighters from Fatah, PFLP and DFLP from the refugee camps in Sidon attacked the Amal positions. In a week of fighting the Palestinians gained control of most of the village. The objective of the offensive was to cut off the Amal forces attacking the Palestinian camps in Tyre from the Amal strongholds in South Beirut. During the fighting Amal accused Christian residents of siding with the Palestinians. At the beginning of the battle there had been 4,000 Christians in the village, by the end of November there were 80. Four village men were killed by Amal on the road out of the village, two of them were axed to death. Most of the villages women and children managed to reach East Beirut. In 1990 the residents of Maghdouché returned to the ruins of their village and began rebuilding what was destroyed in the war.

== Main sights ==
Maghdouché's most famous landmark is the tower of Our Lady of Mantara, which is a Marian shrine built (May 16, 1963), above the cave that is believed to have been the resting place of the Virgin Mary as she waited for Jesus while he preached in Sidon. The tower height is 28 m, Statue height: 8.5 m, width: 3.5 m and the weight is 6 Tons This religious landmark receives many visitors consisting of tourists and residents.

Our Lady of Mantara was considered a religious heritage site and was added to the International Religious Tourism Map in 2016.

== Popular culture ==
A tribute to the town was sung by Lebanese singer Diana Haddad on her 2000 album Jarh AL Habib titled Maghdouche or Mishtaqit Laki Ya Maghdouche ("I miss you Maghdouche"). In September 2009 Haddad performed the same song in honour of the village while participating in their annual music festival held in the town, the singer's ancestral home.

== Bibliography ==
- Guérin, V. (1880). Description Géographique Historique et Archéologique de la Palestine (in French). Vol. 3: Galilee, pt. 2. Paris: L'Imprimerie Nationale.
- Renan, E. (1864). Mission de Phénicie (in French). Paris: Imprimerie impériale.
