= Morh Kfarsghab =

Morh Kfarsghab مرح كفرصغاب
- City
- Location within Lebanon
- Coordinates: 34°20′11″N 35°54′12″E
- Country: Lebanon
- Governorate: North Governorate
- District: Zgharta District
- Elevation: 280 m (920 ft)
- Time zone: UTC+2 (EET)
  - Summer (DST): UTC+3 (EEST)
- Postal code: 1304
- Dialing code: +961 - 6

Morh Kfarsghab (also known as Morh Kfar Sghab, Murh Kafarsghab or Mrah Kfarseghab; Arabic: مرح كفرصغاب, romanized: Murḥ Kfarṣghāb, pronounced [ˈmurħ kafarsˤiˈɣaːb]) is a village located in the Zgharta District in the North Governorate of Lebanon.

Murh Kfarsghab is the winter dwellings of the people of the mountain village of Kfarsghab. It is a typical organization of pastoral and agricultural Mediterranean communities where transhumance, or a seasonal movement of livestock between fixed summer and winter pastures, is still practised.

== Etymology ==
Morh (Arabic: مرح, pronounced [ˈmurħ]) is derived from the Semitic root mrḥ. It is one form of mrah which according to Elie Wardini,

is almost exclusively in Lebanon a spread place name appellation. It signifies stable, hurdle, resting place (for livestock), besides also building in which the silk caterpillar is pulled (reeling of cocoons)…

It gives an indication as to the historical destination of this place during wintertime for the mountain people of Kfarsghab.

As cattle breeding was never a main source of income for Kfarsghab, it is possible that Morh Kfarsghab was used in winter for the Mullberry silkworms which represented a major activity in the region.

For the local people, Morh Kfarsghab is called sāḥil (Arabic: ساحل [saːħil]) which literally means sea coast in Arabic.

== Geography ==
Morh Kfarsghab, the winter village, is located on the north-western slope of the Joueit valley separating Miziara from Bnachii. On average, it sits at 280 meters above sea level. A written document mentioning Morh Kfarsghab is dated to October / November 1748 AD (Thu'l-Qa'dah 1161 Hijri).

== Climate ==
Morh Kfarsghab is a typical Mediterranean plain settlement. There are four seasons, with winters being mild with moderate to heavy rainfall while summers are hot, arid and dry. The highest average temperature is in August at 86 °F (30 °C) while the lowest average temperature is in January at 46 °F (8 °C). However, summer temperatures can top 104 °F (40 °C), and winter temperatures can drop below 35 °F (2 °C). Total yearly precipitation is in the range of 33 inches (810 mm), with the heaviest occurring from late November to early April. Rainfall is exceptional between mid June and mid September.

Climate data for Morh Kfarsghab, Lebanon
Month	Jan	Feb	Mar	Apr	May	Jun	Jul	Aug	Sep	Oct	Nov	Dec	Year
Mean daily maximum °F (°C)	61 (16)	61 (16)	66 (19)	71 (22)	77 (25)	80 (27)	84 (29)	86 (30)	84 (29)	80 (27)	71 (22)	64 (18)	74 (23)
Mean daily minimum °F (°C)	46 (8)	48 (9)	50 (10)	55 (13)	61 (16)	66 (19)	71 (22)	73 (23)	68 (20)	62 (17)	55 (13)	50 (10)	59 (15)
Source: Kfarsghab.net

== Economy ==
=== Agriculture ===
The major issue is scarcity of water. Agricultural activities privileged crops that do not need irrigation, such as olive, grape and fig. The main culture is however olive harvested typically from November to January. In this part of the Mediterranean, a full crop of olive is only occurring every other year. There are in the village around six olive presses for olive oil extraction, most of them using the traditional first cold pressed method ensuring an excellent oil quality. Green olives and black olives are also produced as well as olive oil soap. There is also in Morh Kfarsghab an important production of grape used mainly to produce the national aniseed-flavoured distilled alcoholic drink, the Arak. Grape is harvested in July / August usually. In the recent years, fig lost its importance as it needs continuous care during summertime when most of the people are in the summer village, some 25 kilometers away. Finally, there is also a modest culture of almonds, citrus trees such as orange and lemon. For citrus, as it needs irrigation, it is cultivated in the valley of Joueit where water is available, at least during winters.

The land owned by the Kfarsghab people extends on a large area in the Zgharta District, Bsharri District as well as Koura District. Land was acquired mostly at the beginning of the 20th century thanks to the funds sent by emigrants. The revenues derived from agriculture would have been comfortable if, since the Seventies, the agriculture in Kfarsghab was not plagued by several problems. The main difficulties faced by agriculture are the lack of manpower due to emigration, the unfair competition of foreign products at lower dumped prices especially for olive oil, apple diseases and parasites, the weakness of the Lebanese pound increasing the prices of fertilizers and pesticides, the closing of some important foreign outlets for Lebanese products like Irak, the Lebanese Civil War.
