= Kfarsghab =

Village in Zgharta District, Lebanon

Kfarsghab كفرصغاب
- Village
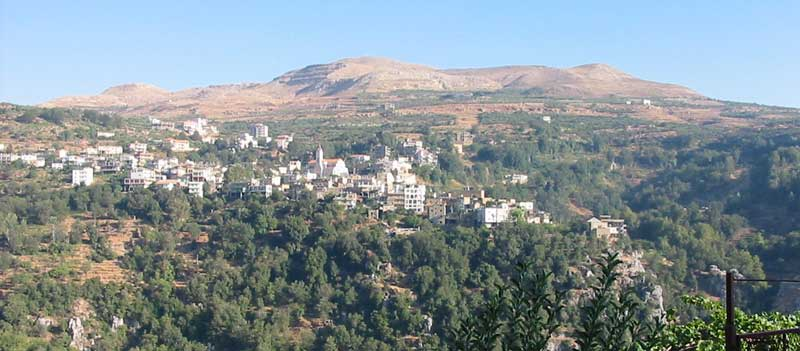
- Kfarsghab as seen from Aintourine - August 2003

- Location within Lebanon
- Coordinates: 34°16′42″N 35°57′44″E
- Country: Lebanon
- Governorate: North Governorate
- District: Zgharta District
- Elevation: 1,380 m (4,530 ft)
- Time zone: UTC+2 (EET)
  - Summer (DST): UTC+3 (EEST)
- Postal code: 1304
- Dialing code: +961 - 6

Kfarsghab ( known also as Kfar Sghab, Kafarsghab or Kfarseghab; Arabic: كفرصغاب, pronounced [kafarsˤiɣaːb]) is a village located in the Zgharta District in the North Governorate of Lebanon. It is situated in the Valley of Qadisha, which is considered a holy and spiritual place in Eastern Christianity. The main religion of its residents is Maronite Catholicism.

Kfarsghab is actually two geographically separated settlements: Kfarsghab, a high mountain village, and Morh Kfarsghab, a plain village, respectively inhabited in summers and in winters. It is a typical organization of pastoral and agricultural Mediterranean communities where transhumance, which is a seasonal movement of livestock between fixed summer and winter pastures, is still practised.

The Lebanese hailing from Kfarsghab number 20,000 worldwide. 95% of them live outside Lebanon, mainly in Australia and the United States.

== Etymology ==
The Semitic name of Kfarsghab is composed of two parts: kfar and sghab. The first part, kfar, comes from the Semitic root kpr which in the context corresponds to the common Semitic noun kapar that means village. For the second part, sghab, comes from the Semitic root sgb which means to make strong, safe. A second possibility could be the name of a person Segub.

Given the above references, the etymological meaning of Kfarsghab could be "the fortified village" or "the village of Segub", Segub being a person name in this latter case.

For the local people, Kfarsghab is referred to as jurid (Arabic: جرد [ɡurd]). The word is of Arabic origin and means the arid barren land.

== History ==
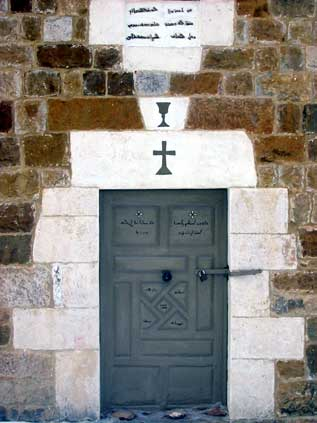
The main entrance of Mar Awtel church built on the ruins of a pagan temple

Kfarsghab predates Christianity. However, like most villages in the Qadisha valley, Kfarsghab's known history began with the settlement of the Maronites in Mount Lebanon during the 10th century. Until the middle of the 18th century Kfarsghab was a village of modest importance, with a total population not exceeding 150 inhabitants.

=== Under the Mamluks ===
The first mention of Kfarsghab in the writings of the Maronite Historians concerns events that happened in 1283 at the end of the Crusaders period. In 1470 Kfarsghab is mentioned, in conjunction with the construction of Saint Awtel's Church.

=== Under the Ottomans ===
In the 16th century, Kfarsghab figured in the two Ottoman Censuses of 1519 and 1571. It is credited respectively with 14 and 12 male adults (of more than 15 years old), all Christians and married. And around 1600, the population of the neighboring village of Qaryat Moussa took refuge in Kfarsghab merging with the existing population after some unrecorded events obliged them to abandon their village.

At the beginning of the 17th century, the region of Kfarsghab witnessed an important migration to the more prosperous Southern Mount Lebanon under the stable rule of Emir Fakhreddine.

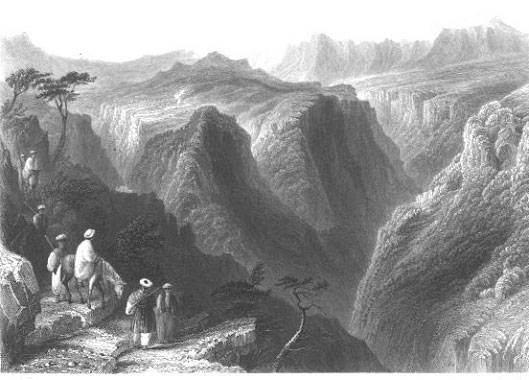
Kfarsghab in the perspective of the Qadisha valley, engraving by Bartlett in 1838

The tragic end of the autonomous Emirate of Fakhreddine in 1635 threw Mount Lebanon in turmoil. The political void in the Kfarsghab region opened the way to bloody conflicts between local notables, accentuating the migration of a weary population. However, by the end of this century, new rulers from the Hamadeh family appointed by the Ottoman authorities succeeded in establishing a relative stability in the region and started re-populating the area encouraging the settlement of Christian families from their southern fiefdoms of Byblos and Batroun. It is at the end of the 17th century that the families composing the modern Kfarsghab arrived in the region.

==== The modern Kfarsghab foundation ====
By the middle of the 18th century, the newly settled families started challenging the Hamadeh's rule and succeeded, along with other families in the region, around 1760 in ousting them out of the region. The family of Abou Youssef Elias was appointed Sheikhs of Kfarsghab and of three other villages by the Ottoman authorities, a charge that the members of this family assumed for the next 100 years.

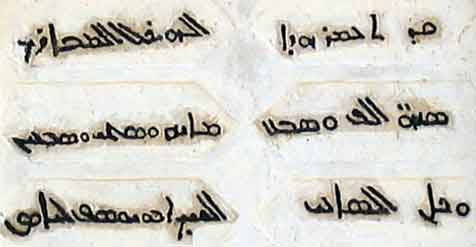
The inscription on the main entrance of Mar Awtel church commemorating the extension of 1776

Under the energetic rule of this family, Kfarsghab witnessed an important prosperity and demographic development driven by silkworm rearing and land acquisition. It was in the middle of the 18th century that the people of Kfarsghab acquired and developed the lower land that will become their winter dwellings, Morh Kfarsghab. In 1849, the number of male adults totaled 374, a thirty-time increase compared to the 17th century figures.

=== The emigration ===
Between 1850 and 1875, demographic pressure obliged the young men of Kfarsghab to join massively the monastic orders. It is estimated that 10% of the male adult population joined the monastic life during the 19th century.

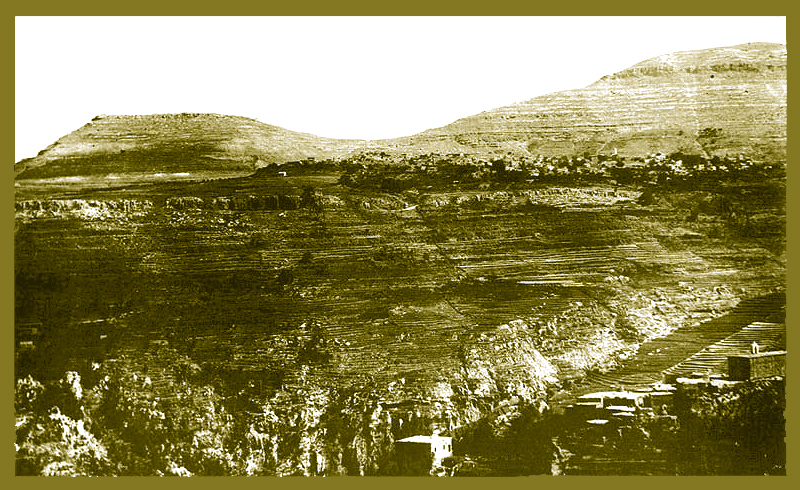
Ehden & Kfarsghab seen from Bane in 1896

But the economic difficulties of the silk industry, the political situation of the new Mutassarifiah regime of Mount Lebanon (1865–1915) and changing conditions of the monk orders pushed the people of Kfarsghab to find new economic outlets by emigrating massively from 1885 onwards to the United States and Australia. It is estimated that Kfarsghab lost during the last 15 years of this century' 20% of its population.

Emigration was halted by the First World War, only to resume massively from 1925. The French Mandate and the formation of the modern Lebanon in 1925 did not slow down emigration. The demographic weakening continued all along the 20th century, especially during the Lebanese Civil war (1975–1990). Today about 20,000 people around the world are related to Kfarsghab by their origin, only 1,000 of them are living in the village.

== Geography ==
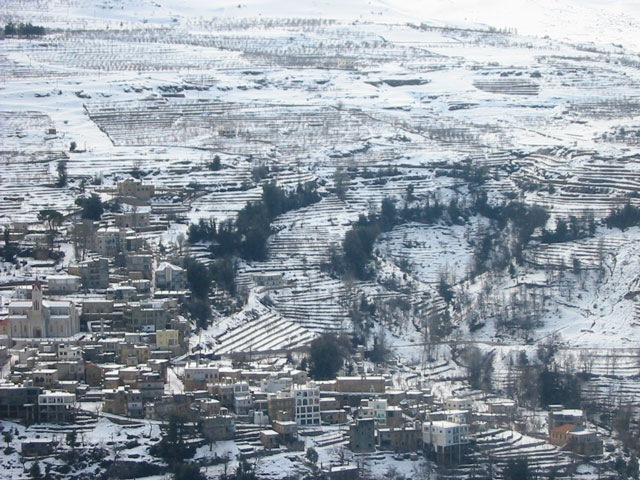
Kfarsghab under snow in January 2004.

Kfarsghab is composed of two geographically separated settlements: Kfarsghab and Morh Kfarsghab respectively inhabited in summers and in winters. It is a typical organization of pastoral Mediterranean communities. For Kfarsghab, a total exodus of the population takes place twice a year in May and in October. All families without exception have a house in each village. The other well-known example in Lebanon is that of the neighboring town(s) of Ehden / Zgharta. In the recent years, the seasonal migration for Ehden / Zgharta is losing its importance with the necessities created by the development of the service sector in the coastal pole of Zgharta/Tripoli, increasing number of salaried employees and the growing financial difficulties of the households to maintain two dwellings. For Kfarsghab, the seasonal transhumance is still respected as agriculture remains the main activity.

Kfarsghab, the summer village, is located on the road going from Ehden to Bsharri in the northern part of the Qadisha valley, overlooking the Qozhaya valley at an average altitude of 1380 meters. Kfarsghab is mentioned in documents as old as 1283 AD.

Morh Kfarsghab, the winter village, is located on the north-western slope of the Joueit valley separating Miziara from Bnachii. On average, it sits at 280 meters above sea level. A written document mentioning Morh Kfarsghab is dated to October / November 1748 AD (Thu'l-Qa'dah 1161 Hijri).

== Climate ==
Kfarsghab is a typical Mediterranean high mountain village. There are four seasons, with winters being cold with moderate to heavy snowfall while summers are mild and dry. The area experiences fog during late summer, early fall and late spring. The highest average temperature is in July/August at 81 °F (27 °C) while the lowest average temperature is in January/February at 35 °F (2 °C). However, summer temperatures can top 90 °F (32 °C), and winter temperatures can drop below 23 °F (−5 °C). Total yearly precipitation is in the range of 48 inches (1,200 mm), with the heaviest occurring during the fall and spring. Snowfall, which normally occurs from late November to early April, ranges from 1 to 10 inches (3 to 25 cm) per month.

Climate data for Kfarsghab, Lebanon
Month	Jan	Feb	Mar	Apr	May	Jun	Jul	Aug	Sep	Oct	Nov	Dec	Year
Mean daily maximum °F (°C)	46 (8)	46 (8)	50 (10)	57 (14)	68 (20)	77 (25)	81 (27)	81 (27)	75 (24)	68 (20)	62 (17)	52 (11)	64 (18)
Mean daily minimum °F (°C)	35 (2)	35 (2)	39 (4)	44 (7)	52 (11)	59 (15)	68 (20)	66 (19)	61 (16)	52 (11)	46 (8)	41 (5)	50 (10)
Source: Kfarsghab.net

== Economy ==
Economy is based mainly on agriculture. The existence of two settlements, Kfarsghab and Morh Kfarsghab, at different altitudes ensure continuous and varied crops throughout the year.

=== Agriculture ===
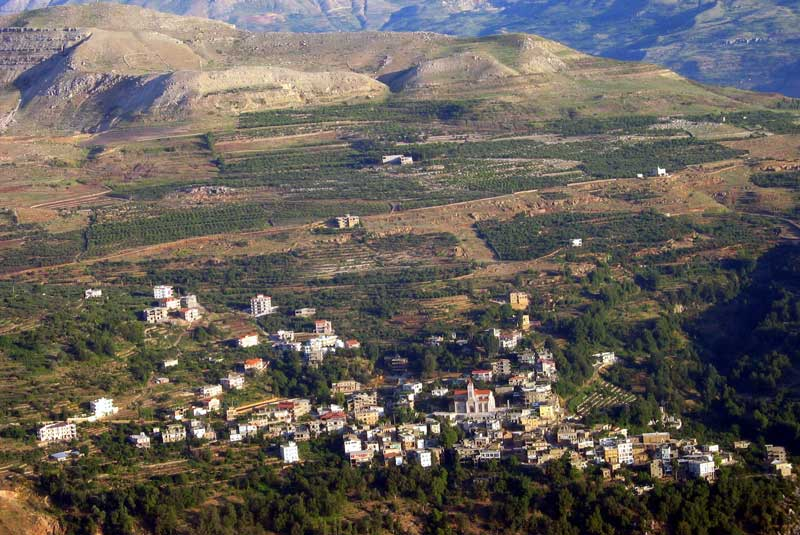
Kfarsghab as seen from Ehden in June 2004.

For Kfarsghab, the crops are summer fruits, mainly apples and pears. Pears are harvested during August and apples from mid September to mid October. Other fruits are also cultivated like peaches and cherries but on a modest scale.

The land owned by the Kfarsghab people extends on a large area in the Zgharta District, Bsharri District as well as Koura District. Land was acquired mostly at the beginning of the 20th century thanks to the funds sent by emigrants. The revenues derived from agriculture would have been comfortable if, since the Seventies, the agriculture in Kfarsghab was not plagued by several problems. The main difficulties faced by agriculture are the lack of manpower due to emigration, the unfair competition of foreign products at lower dumped prices especially for olive oil, apple diseases and parasites, the weakness of the Lebanese pound increasing the prices of fertilizers and pesticides, the closing of some important foreign outlets for Lebanese products like Iraq, the Lebanese Civil War.

=== Services ===
Services in Kfarsghab are not developed at all: a small snack / restaurant, an internet-cafe, few shops, few local taxis and individual truck owners. All the existing services are mostly complementary business to the main agricultural activity. The few salaried people in teaching and in the regional services sector do not count on the salaries derived from their job to ensure a decent living.

=== Construction sector ===
Since the 1990s, the construction sector developed rapidly thanks to emigrants and residents building, extending or renovating their real estate properties. Several highly qualified individual contractors are found among the natives of Kfarsghab. Since 2005, this sector is facing some difficulties due to the general political situation of the country.

=== Emigrants remittances and support ===
Several welfare organizations founded by the emigrants support the infrastructure projects in Kfarsghab such as the public library, the public halls, the health center, the water supply, the roads, the churches and public buildings renovation. Also, emigrants help and support financially their relatives in the village.

== Arabic accent ==
Kfarsghab's particular Arabic accent is unique in Lebanon with its unusual ‘a’/‘o’ transformation phenomenon, meaning that the vowel a in Arabic words is vocalized as o. Some saw there the influence of the Syriac language and many scholars studied the subject without a definite conclusion as to the origin of this evolution. Here's what says about it Henri Fleisch in his study Le Parler Arabe de Kfar-Sghab:

... an originality of the ((Arabic)) accent of Kfarsghab is not to be limited by a silence at the drop of the voice for the pause, as the Arab dialects commonly do, but to mark this stop by a special form: a pausal form (Kfarsghab shares this originality with other accents of Lebanon: Zahlé and Shhim). The generally established classical Arabic system used the iskan to mark the pause. Kfarsghab has recourse to diphthongizations or changes of timbre of vowels; in the same way it is in Shhim and also in Zahlé...

... A major originality of the accent of Kfarsghab is its vocalism evolution. The Lebanese are especially struck by the frequency of its vowel 'o'. The well-read men see there an influence of the Syriac, as they attribute the 'o' one hears in North-Lebanon to an influence of the Syriac. In fact, the Syriac has no relation to this.

In Syriac, in the Jacobite pronunciation which was that of the Syriac in Lebanon, the passage from a to o is unconditional: all a's are transformed, whatever their position, whatever the consonnatic context, the phenomenon is general. In North-Lebanon, it is not the case: the passage of a to o occurs only in determined cases, it is conditioned. A good example to make feel the difference between the Syriac and the usage of dialectal Arabic in North-Lebanon is the treatment of the Arabic word kitab (Arabic: كتاب meaning book): in Syriac: ketob; in Kfarsghab: ktib; elsewhere in the North, ktéb.

The major advantage of Kfarsghab, for the linguistic science, is to have pushed to the extreme the tendencies which govern the vowel a in North-Lebanon and in consequence to put in full light the transformation processes; it is thus in the center of this linguistic movement...

It is still more intriguing for the local population. The popular tradition in Kfarsghab attributes its particular accent to the special characteristics of the drinking water. From sociological point of view, a major difference in accent between neighboring settlements denotes usually either geographical isolation, or an unconscious collective will of identity conservation. It is true that the winter village, Morh Kfarsghab, is relatively isolated but for the original village, Kfarsghab, which was used for the major part of the year, geography is not an evident reason. The explanation for the difference has to be found somewhere else.

As to when this accent took its final shape, linguists do not have a model that estimates the period of time necessary to form an accent.

Since the mid-1950s, emigration and education are contributing to the standardization of the original Kfarsghabian accent.

== See also ==
- Mar Awtel (Saint Awtel), the Saint Patron of Kfarsghab
- History of Kfarsghab
- Morh Kfarsghab, the winter village of Kfarsghab
- Mart Moura (Saint Moura), Historical shrine in Kfarsghab
