= Jean Kahwaji =

Lebanese military commander

- جان قهوجي
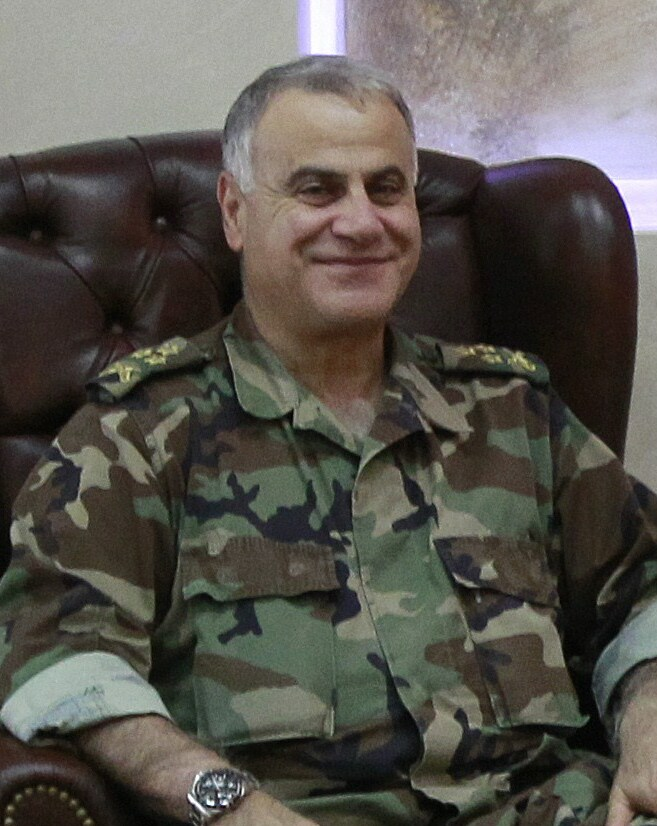
- Kahwaji in 2012

13th Commander of the Lebanese Armed Forces
- In office 30 August 2008 – 8 March 2017
- President: Michel Suleiman; Michel Aoun
- Preceded by: Michel Suleiman
- Succeeded by: Joseph Aoun

Personal details
- Born: 23 September 1953 (age 73) Ain Ebel, Nabatiye, Lebanon
- Party: Independent
- Spouse: Marleine Sfeir
- Education: Lebanese Army Military Academy

Military service
- Allegiance: Lebanon
- Branch/service: Lebanese Army
- Years of service: 1973–2017
- Rank: General

Jean Kahwaji (Arabic: جان قهوجي, MSA: [ʤaːn qah'waʤiː] or Lebanese Arabic: [ʒɑ̃ ʔah'waʒɛ]; born 1953) is a former Lebanese military officer who served as the 13th commander of the Lebanese Armed Forces from 2008 to 2017.

== Career ==
Kahwaji joined the Lebanese army in 1973. He trained abroad, especially in the United States and Italy. He also underwent anti-terrorism training in Germany in 2006, as well as in Italy. He headed the army's 12th Infantry Brigade since 2002. He also went to the Swedish military school in Boden Garrison in Sweden for terrain warfare during the 1990s.

On 30 August 2008, the Lebanese government appointed Brigadier-General Kahwaji to be chief of the Lebanese Armed Forces, replacing Michel Suleiman, who became President of Lebanon in May 2008. He was the 13th chief officer in the army's history.

== Corruption charges ==
Kahwaji has been charged several times with corruption and illicit enrichment. As an army official, Kahwaji is suspected of using his influence to accrue vast fortunes, and accepting bribes. In December 2020, a Lebanese judge has filed corruption charges against him and other high-ranked officials.

== Murder enquiry ==
On 24 January 2023, Judge Tarek Bitar charged Kahwaji and the former Prime Minister, Hassan Diab, with 'Homicide with intent' under the probe into the Beirut explosion in 2020. Judge Bitar also charged Prosecutor General Ghassan Oweidat - the head of Lebanon's domestic intelligence agency Major General Abbas Ibrahim and other current and former security and judicial officials.

== Personal life ==
Jean Kahwaji is married to Marleine Sfeir. They have three children: Jad, Joanna and Joe. He is a Maronite Catholic.

== See also ==
- Lebanese Armed Forces
- Lebanese Civil War
- 2nd Infantry Brigade (Lebanon)

Military offices
Preceded by Michel Suleiman	Commander of the Lebanese Armed Forces; 2008 – 2017	Succeeded by Joseph Aoun
