= Ibrahim Tannous =

Former commander of the Lebanese Armed Forces

Ibrahim Tannous ابراهيم طنّوس

9th Commander of the Lebanese Armed Forces
- In office December 8, 1982 – June 23, 1984
- President: Amine Gemayel
- Preceded by: Victor Khoury
- Succeeded by: Michel Aoun

Personal details
- Born: 1929 Kobayat, French Lebanon (now Al Qoubaiyat, Akkar Governate, Lebanon)
- Died: 26 December 2012 (aged 82–83)
- Party: Independent
- Education: Lebanese Army Military Academy

Military service
- Allegiance: Lebanon
- Branch/service: Lebanese Army
- Years of service: 1952–1988
- Rank: General

Ibrahim Tannous (1929 – December 26, 2012) was a former commander of the Lebanese Armed Forces. General Tannous earned a reputation for honesty and was seen as “a general willing to get his uniform dirty to build a fighting Lebanese Army,” in the words of one Arab authority.

Tannous took over command of the Lebanese Armed Forces (LAF) in December 1982, during the early years of the civil war and oversaw joint operations with the Multinational Force that was in charge of training LAF forces and restoring order to Beirut. Tannous, who was close to President Gemayel, resigned his post as armed forces commander in June 1984 as a concession to government's opposition factions who were calling for restructuring the army and was succeeded by Michel Aoun. Until Gen. Tannous' resignation, the army was one of the most important institution supporting the U.S.-backed Gemayel Government, however, Tannous' departure marked a major shift in the American-trained armed forces towards a policy closely in tune with Syria's foreign policy and security objectives.

== Personal life ==
Married with four children.

== Military career ==
- Enrolled in the Military Academy as a Cadet Officer on 10/16/1952
- Promoted to second lieutenant on 10/1/1955
- Promoted to first lieutenant on 10/1/1958
- Promoted to captain on 1/1/1965
- Promoted to major on 1/1/1969
- Promoted to lieutenant colonel of Staff on 7/1/1972
- Promoted to colonel of staff on 1/1/1980
- Promoted to general of staff on 12/8/1982
- Promoted to lieutenant general on 12/8/1982

== Functions ==
- Assigned to 4th artillery regiment on 8/1/1956
- Assigned to the Military Academy (Deputy Trainer) on 9/1/1957
- Reinstated to the 4th artillery regiment on 8/1/1958
- Assigned to the general Headquarters – 4th Bureau on 10/1/1958
- Was assigned to the 5th artillery battalion- commander of battalion, on 6/4/1962
- Was assigned to the 2nd artillery regiment, artillery brigade (deputy-commander of regiment) on 1/25/1966
- Appointed commander of artillery regiment on 7/3/1968
- Appointed chief of the 4th Bureau per Interim, as from 5/21/1965 to 8/16/1970
- Appointed Deputy Chief of the 4th Bureau on 8/17/1970
- Appointed chief of the Co-operative service at the Social Affairs directorate on 10/4/1971
- Appointed chief of the Finance control Office at the directorate of Administrative Control on 4/21/1972
- Was assigned to the region of North Lebanon on 7/21/1973
- Was assigned to the HQ of the infantry brigade
  - Chief of Staff of brigade on 8/1/1973
- Was assigned to the independent anti-tanks company (artillery commander) on 8/3/1974
- Was transferred to the company of the Bekaa regional district
  - Regional deputy to the commander of the region on 7/18/1974
- Was detached to the Beirut region Command as from 9/16/1974 to 9/26/1974
- Appointed Deputy to the Commander of the Bekaa region on 12/21/1974
- Was detached to command by Interim, the Eastern defense Sector, on 2/28/1975
- Assigned to the HQ Battalion of the 1st infantry brigade- Chief of Staff of the brigade on 8/18/1975
- Assigned to the Army Headquarters Battalion as Chief of the Studies, organization and planning Office on 8/30/1975
- Assigned to the Sector No. 3/Unit 31 as commander of the group on 3/15/1978
- Appointed Armed Forces Commander on 12/8/1982
- Was released from his duty as the Armed Forces Commander, on his request, and was put at the disposition of the minister of National Defense on 6/23/1984
- Retired to pension on 7/1/1988

== Medals, awards and honors ==
- Lebanese order of Merit in Silver
- National order of the Cedar in Class of Knight
- Commemorative Medal of 12/13/1961
- National Order of the Cedar in Officer Class
- Lebanese Order of Merit with branches in Second Class
- War Medal, two times
- National Order of the Cedar, Class of Commander
- National order of Merit in Grand Cordon Class
- Lebanese Order of Merit in First Class
- Commendation of the Minister of National Defense, one time
- Commendation of the Armed Forces Commander, two times
- Felicitations of the Armed Forces Commander, 3 times

Preceded by Victor Khoury	Armed Forces Commander of the Lebanese Armed Forces; 1982-1984	Succeeded by Michel Aoun
