= Emile Boustany =

Lebanese military officer (1909–2002)

4th Commander of the Lebanese Armed Forces
- In office 1 July 1965 – 6 January 1970
- Preceded by: Adel Shehab
- Succeeded by: Jean Njeim

head of the Second Bureau

Personal details
- Born: 1909 Jounieh, Ottoman Empire
- Died: 2002 (aged 92–93)
- Children: 1 daughter
- Occupation: Commander in Lebanese Armed Forces

Military service
- Allegiance: Lebanon
- Branch/service: Lebanese Army
- Years of service: 1965–1970
- Rank: General
- Battles/wars: 1948 Arab–Israeli War; 1958 Lebanon Crisis

Emile Boustany (Arabic: إميل البستاني; 1909–2002) was a Lebanese military general who served as the Commander of the Lebanese Armed Forces from 1 July 1965 until 6 January 1970.

== Biography ==
Boustany was born in Jounieh to a poor Lebanese family. He served as a commander with the rank of general in the Lebanese Armed Forces from 1 July 1965 to 6 January 1970.

Boustany went to Egypt in 1969 and drafted the Cairo Accord, which allowed the Palestinian Liberation Organization to establish bases in Lebanon and conduct operations against Israel independent of the Lebanese army. It is said that Egyptian President Nasser was pleasantly surprised to see the degree of concession offered to him - at the time Egypt had a strong say in electing the Lebanese president.

In 1973, he was named the primary suspect in a bribery scandal within the Lebanese Army related to arms transactions. He fled to Syria where he was granted asylum by Hafez al-Assad. From Syria, he helped to subvert Saeb Salam's government.

Boustany's daughter, Loubna, married Jean Obeid.

== Awards and honors ==
- Lebanese Silver Order of Merit
- Syrian Order of Merit in 2nd grade
- Commemorative Medal of Palestine
- National Order of the Cedar in grade of Knight
- Order of the Phoenix in rank of Commandor
- War Medal in Silver Star
- Lebanese Golden Medal of Merit
- National Order of the Cedar in Officer Grade
- American Legion of Merit
- Order of the Throne of Marrakech in grade of grand officer
- Medal of the Eagle for aviation in excellent class
- Golden Commemorative Medal of his Holiness Pope Leon XIII of the Latin Patriarchate of Jerusalem
- Lebanese Order of Merit, order of Commandor
- Commemorative Medal
- Medal of Competence from the Minister of the Interior
- Brazilian National Order of Merit in grade of grand officer
- Haitian National Order of Honor and Merit in grade of Grand Cordon
- Senegalese National Order in grade of grand officer
- Ethiopian Grand Cordon
- Grand Cordons of the Order of Independence (Jordan)
- National Order of the Cedar in grade of grand officer
- Military Medal
- Felicitations of the Prime Minister
- Commendation for the troop
- Felicitations of the Commander of the Mount Lebanon region
