= Victor Khoury =

Former Minister of Defense of Lebanon

8th Commander of the Lebanese Armed Forces
- In office 28 March 1977 – 7 December 1982
- Preceded by: Hanna Saïd
- Succeeded by: Ibrahim Tannous

Personal details
- Born: 1929
- Died: 2 February 2017 (age 87–88)

Military service
- Allegiance: Lebanon
- Branch/service: Lebanese Armed Forces
- Rank: General
- Battles/wars: 1958 Lebanon Crisis; Lebanese Civil War

Victor Khoury (1929 – 2 February 2017) (in Arabic فيكتور خوري) was the commander of the Lebanese Army. He was also Minister of Defense in the Lebanese government led by Selim Hoss during the reign of President Elias Sarkis from December 1978 to July 1979.

Khoury was born in Amchit, Caza of Byblos, Lebanon. He was enrolled in the Army and entered the Military Academy as a Cadet Officer in 1948. He was promoted gradually through the ranks until he was Lieutenant Colonel in 1966 and Brigadier General in 1977. He was appointed as General of the Army from 28 March 1977 to 7 December 1982.

He was married and had three children. He died on 2 February 2017. He was 88 years old.

== See also ==
- Commander of the Lebanese Army
