= List of international presidential trips made by Michel Aoun =

This is a list of international presidential trips made by Michel Aoun, the 13th President of Lebanon.

== 2017 ==
Country	Areas visited	Date(s)	Notes
Saudi Arabia	Riyadh	9 January-10 January	Met with King Salman.
Qatar	Doha	11 January	Met with Emir Tamim bin Hamad Al Thani.
Egypt	Cairo	17 February	Met with President Abdel Fattah Al Sisi.
Jordan	Amman	18 February	Met with the King Abdallah II of Jordan
Jordan	Amman	23–29 March	Attended 2017 Arab League summit.
United States	New York City	18-22 September	Aoun participated in the 72nd session of the United Nations General Assembly and met with several heads of state.
France	Paris	25-29 September	Met with President Emmanuel Macron.
Italy	Rome	28-30 November	Met with President Sergio Mattarella.
Turkey	Istanbul	13 December	Attended Sixth Extraordinary Session of the Islamic Summit Conference.

== 2018 ==
Country	Areas visited	Date(s)	Notes
Kuwait	Kuwait City	January 24–25	Met with Emir Sabah Al-Ahmad Al-Jaber Al-Sabah.
Iraq	Baghdad	February 20–21	Met with President Fuad Masum.
Armenia	Yerevan	February 22-23	Met with President Serzh Sargsyan.
Saudi Arabia	Dhahran	April 14-16	Attended the 2018 Arab League summit.
France	Strasbourg	10–12 September	Gave a speech at the European Parliament.
United States	New York City	23-26 September	Aoun participated in the 73rd session of the United Nations General Assembly and met with several heads of state.
Armenia	Yerevan	October 10-12	Attended the 17th Francophonie Summit.

== 2019 ==
Country	Areas visited	Date(s)	Notes
Russia	Moscow	25–26 March	Met with President Vladimir Putin.
Tunisia	Tunis	30-31 March	Attending the Arab League Summit in Tunis.
United States	New York City	22-26 September	Aoun participated in the 74th session of the United Nations General Assembly and met with several heads of state.

== 2020 ==
Country	Areas visited	Date(s)	Notes
Kuwait	Kuwait International Airport	5 October	Condolences on the death of Sabah Al-Ahmad Al-Jaber Al-Sabah.

== 2021 ==
Country	Areas visited	Date(s)	Notes
Qatar	Doha	21 November	Met with Emir Tamim bin Hamad Al Thani.

== 2022 ==
Country	Areas visited	Date(s)	Notes
Italy	Rome	20–23 March	Met with President Sergio Mattarella.
Vatican City		21 March	Met with Pope Francis.
