= Rodolphe Haykal =

Lebanese military officer

- رودولف هيكل
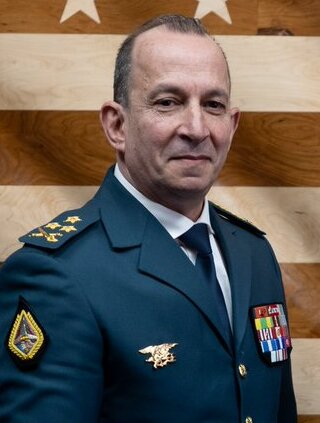
- Haykal in 2026

15th Commander of the Lebanese Armed Forces
- Incumbent
- Assumed office 13 March 2025
- President: Joseph Aoun
- Preceded by: Joseph Aoun; Hassan Audi (acting)

Personal details
- Born: 1969 (age 56–57) Beirut, Lebanon
- Children: 2

Military service
- Allegiance: Lebanon
- Branch: Lebanese Army
- Rank: General
- Wars: Lebanese Civil War; Syrian civil war spillover in Lebanon

Rodolphe Haykal (Arabic: رودولف هيكل; born 1969) is a Lebanese military officer who was appointed on March 13, 2025 as commander of the Lebanese Armed Forces. He previously served as the Director of Operations in the Lebanese Army, recognized as one of Lebanon’s most prominent military leaders. His name emerged earlier in March as a leading candidate for the position of Commander of the Lebanese Army following the election of General Joseph Aoun to the presidency of Lebanon on January 9, 2025.

== Early life and education ==
Rodolph Haykal was born in Beirut in 1969 to a Maronite family from Aaqtanit, Sidon District. He holds a Lebanese Baccalaureate in Mathematics, a university degree in Military Sciences, and an Executive Diploma in Strategic and Defense Studies.

== Military career ==
Haykal has had a long and distinguished military career, holding various leadership positions. One of his key roles was Commander of the First Brigade of the Lebanese Army. During his tenure, Haykal successfully led critical military operations, reinforcing the army's ability to maintain national security and stability. His leadership is noted for strong organizational and strategic planning skills, and he has worked extensively to enhance military training and improve operational readiness within his forces.

In 2023, Haykal had assumed the role of Commander of the South Litani Sector, one of the most sensitive areas in Lebanon due to its proximity to the Israeli border and the presence of the United Nations Interim Force in Lebanon (UNIFIL). In this position, Haikal played a role in coordinating military operations between the Lebanese Armed Forces and UNIFIL, ensuring security and stability in the region, and strengthening cooperation between the Lebanese military and international peacekeeping forces operating in Southern Lebanon.

Following his leadership in the South Litani Sector, Haykal was appointed Director of Operations for the Lebanese Army in June 2024, placing him in charge of planning and overseeing military operations across Lebanon. In this role, he became responsible for coordinating efforts between various military units, ensuring operational efficiency and national security.

=== Commander of the Lebanese Armed Forces ===
After the election of General Joseph Aoun as President of Lebanon, Haykal reportedly emerged as the leading candidate for the position of Commander of the Lebanese Army. Following the formation of Prime Minister Nawaf Salam’s government and its vote of confidence in Parliament, the government held its first session on March 6, 2025. During this session, an agreement was reached to appoint Rudolf Haikal as the new Commander of the Lebanese Armed Forces.

On March 14, 2025, Haykal appointed Nicholas Thabet as the new commander of the Southern Litani Sector in the Lebanese Army. Thabet's role as the new commander, succeeds General Edgard Lawandos, who was appointed as the new head of State Security during a Cabinet meeting on March 13, 2025.

On 5 September 2025, he presented to the Cabinet of Nawaf Salam the Army's plan for state control over weapons and the disarmament of Hezbollah. The cabinet approved the plan and stated the army will implement the plan according to its capabilities.

Haykal was supposed to visit Washington for a meeting with senior US officials and events at the Lebanese embassy on 18 November, 2025. The visit was cancelled and he was notified shortly before departure. According to sources the visit was cancelled due to his statement accusing only Israel for the crisis in Lebanon, avoiding criticism of Hezbollah. This is linked to the US pressure on the Lebanese Armed Forces as it struggles to implement the disarmament of Hezbollah.

==== 2026 visit to the US ====
Haykal visited the US between Feb 2-5, 2026, with the invitation of the US Joint Chiefs of Staff. this visit took place as the previous one that was scheduled for Nov 2025, was cancelled as US officials were dissatisfied with his public position on Israel and Hezbollah. The purpose of these current meetings were to discuss cooperation on regional security and counter terrorism issues. His visit caused a major controversy when he declined to recognize Hezbollah as a “terrorist organization”, making Republican Senator Lindsey Graham cut their meeting short.

== Personal life ==
He is married to Jeanette Haykal and together have two children.

== See also ==
- Lebanese Armed Forces
- Disarmament of Hezbollah
