= Joseph Aoun =

President of Lebanon since 2025

His Excellency Joseph Aoun
- جوزيف عون
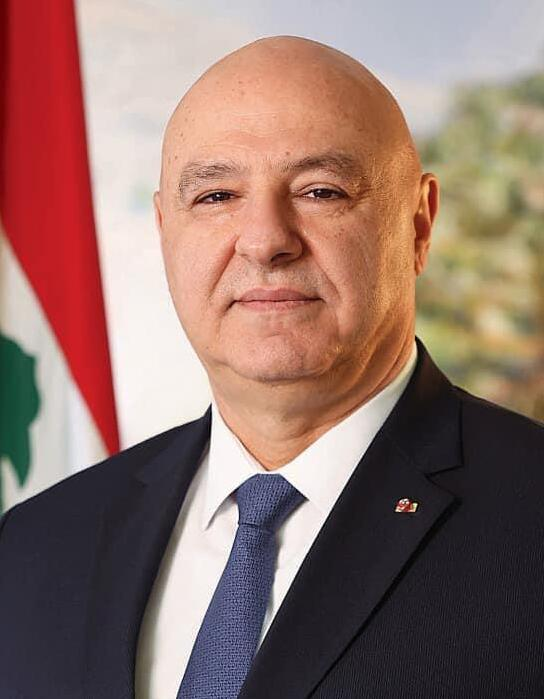
- Official portrait, 2025

14th President of Lebanon
- Incumbent
- Assumed office 9 January 2025
- Prime Minister: Najib Mikati; Nawaf Salam
- Preceded by: Michel Aoun

14th Commander of the Lebanese Armed Forces
- In office 8 March 2017 – 9 January 2025
- President: Michel Aoun; Najib Mikati (acting)
- Preceded by: Jean Kahwaji
- Succeeded by: Hassan Audi (acting); Rodolphe Haykal

Personal details
- Born: Joseph Khalil Aoun; 10 January 1964 (age 62) Sin el Fil, Mount Lebanon, Lebanon
- Party: Independent
- Spouse: Nehmat Aoun
- Children: 2
- Education: Lebanese American University (BA); Lebanese Army Military Academy

Military service
- Allegiance: Lebanon
- Branch: Lebanese Army
- Service years: 1983–2025
- Rank: General
- Wars: Lebanese Civil War; Syrian civil war spillover in Lebanon

Joseph Khalil Aoun (Note: /aʊn/; Arabic: جوزيف خليل عون, romanized: Jōzēf Khalīl ʿAwn) (Note: The standard spelling of the name jōzēf is جوزيف but the standard spelling in Lebanon is جوزاف due to the Imāla in the Lebanese (Beiruti) dialect. Both spellings appear across different media sources.) (born 10 January 1964) is a Lebanese politician and former army general who has served as the 14th president of Lebanon since 2025. He has previously served as the commander of the Lebanese Armed Forces, and is the fifth president with a military background.

Born to a Maronite Christian family in the Beirut suburb of Sin el Fil, Aoun enrolled in the Lebanese American University where he got a bachelor's degree in political science and also another degree in military science from the Lebanese Army Military Academy. In 1983, Aoun joined the Lebanese Armed Forces and mainly received military training abroad in Syria and the United States, where he underwent counter-terrorism in 2008, and also in 2013 in Lebanon. In 1990, Aoun served in the Lebanese Commando Regiment in the Lebanese Armed Forces and participated in the War of Elimination where he fought for Michel Aoun (no relation). The commander of the unit, Bassam Gergi, was killed, and thus Aoun took over and became the commander.

In 2015, Aoun was appointed commander of the 9th Brigade deployed on the border with Israel. Two years later in March 2017, he was officially appointed commander of the Lebanese Armed Forces, replacing Jean Kahwaji. During this time, Aoun gained national popularity due to his leadership style and his role in fighting terrorist groups like the Islamic State and Jabhat al-Nusra. Since 2022, Aoun was consistently reported as one of the possible presidential candidates to succeed President Michel Aoun in the presidential election. In January 2025, Aoun was elected president, thus ending a two-year political crisis.

== Early life and education ==
Aoun was born on 10 January 1964 to a Maronite Christian family, in the Beirut suburb of Sin el-Fil in the Metn District, the child of Hoda Ibrahim Makhlouta and Khalil Aoun. He completed secondary school at the Collège des Frères Mont La Salle. His family is originally from the town of Al-Aaishiyah, Southern Lebanon.

Aoun enrolled at the Lebanese American University to pursue a bachelor's degree in political science and international affairs, which he earned in 2007. He also holds a bachelor's degree in military science from the Lebanese Army Military Academy.

== Military career ==
Aoun joined the Lebanese army in 1983 and enrolled in the military academy during the Lebanese civil war. He trained abroad, especially in the United States and Syria. He also underwent counter-terrorism training in the United States in 2008 and Lebanon in 2013. He became head of the army's 9th Infantry Brigade in 2015.

=== Lebanese Civil War ===
In 1990, Aoun served as a lieutenant in the Lebanese Army's Commando Regiment (Arabic: فوج المغاوير) under leader Bassam Gergi at the Adma barracks. In the 1990 Elimination War, two hundred commandos loyal to General Michel Aoun were trapped in their base in Adma wa Dafneh by Samir Geagea’s Lebanese Forces militia (LF) until a truce was arranged to allow their evacuation. Gergi was killed and Aoun took over leadership within the unit.

=== Commander of Lebanese Armed Forces ===
In 2015, Aoun was appointed commander of the 9th Brigade deployed on the border with Israel. On 8 March 2017, the Lebanese government appointed him commander-in-chief of the Lebanese Armed Forces (LAF), replacing Jean Kahwaji.

Shortly after his appointment, Aoun led the LAF in a successful military operation against the Islamic State and Jabhat al-Nusra in the eastern border region of Ras Baalbeck and al-Qaa in August 2017. The operation, formally known as Fajr al-Joroud (Dawn of the Outskirts), lasted less than two weeks and resulted in the deaths of over 150 jihadists, with seven LAF soldiers killed in action. The operation also recovered the remains of eight soldiers who had been kidnapped by ISIS in 2014 and later executed. Aoun declared the operation a "decisive victory against terrorism," earning commendation from the United States and regional actors.

Following protests in Lebanon and the political deadlock, Aoun spoke out on 8 March 2021 criticising the Lebanese liquidity crisis and its impact on the military.

On 15 December 2023, the Lebanese parliament voted to extend Aoun's term for one year, which was mainly endorsed by the Lebanese Opposition, the Amal Movement and the Progressive Socialist Party. During this time, he led the LAF through the 2024 Israeli invasion of Lebanon. On 28 November 2024, parliament voted to extend his term a second time.

== Political career ==
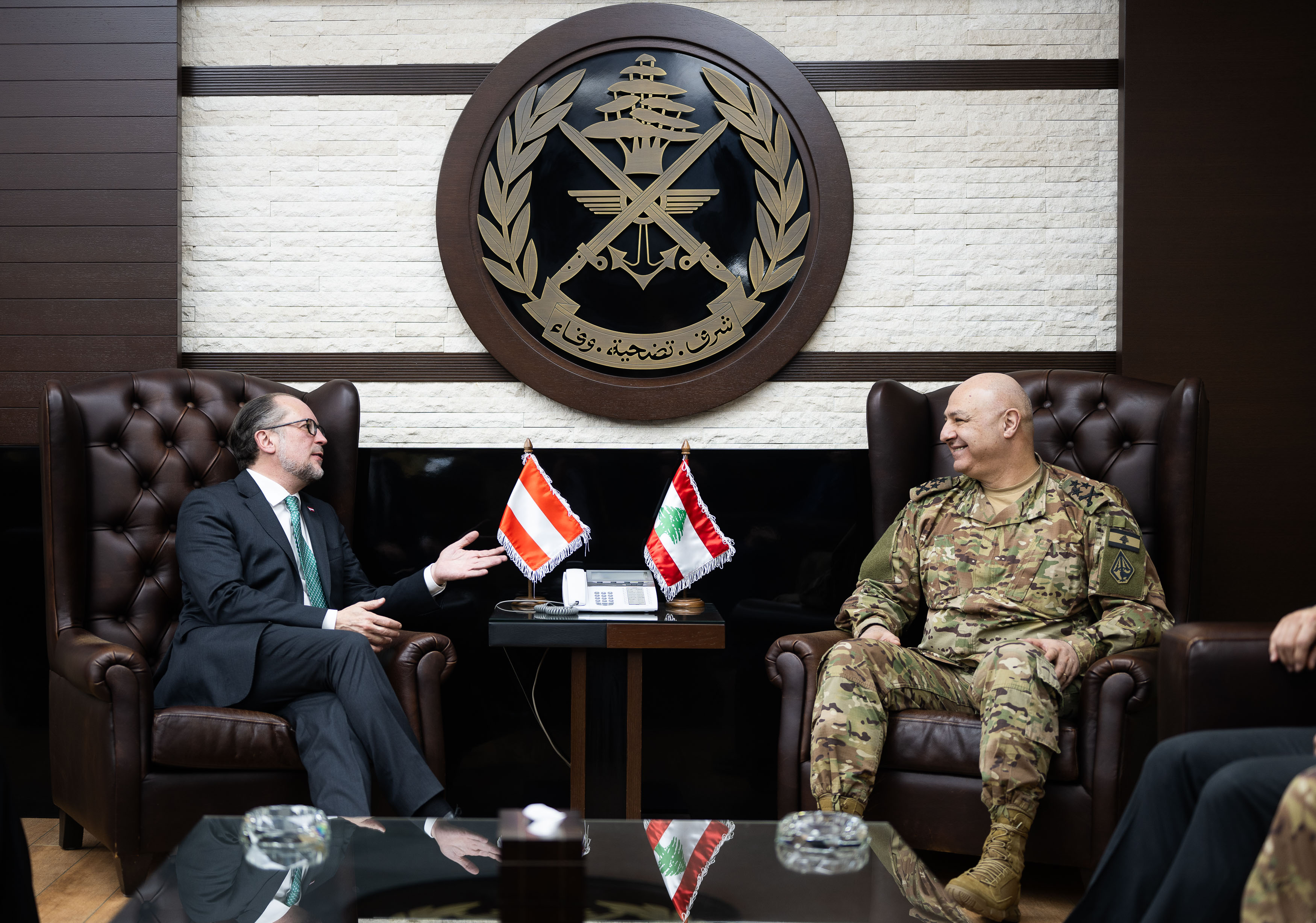
Aoun meeting with Austrian Minister of Foreign Affairs Alexander Schallenberg in February 2024

Aoun's possible presidential candidacy was first raised by Lebanese Forces leader Samir Geagea in July 2022 who suggested that he would make a good successor to Michel Aoun. Qatar declared support for his candidacy during a visit by officials as they vowed to support the army with financial and military aid; the United States followed with support.

In December 2022, a five-nation group was formed by the Doha envoy which involved the United States, France, Saudi Arabia, and Egypt to hold talks and resolve the presidential vacancy in Lebanon in which most countries affirmed their support for Aoun's election.

Walid Jumblatt was the first to officially announce, in 2024, that the Democratic Gathering bloc, which he leads, would elect him. On 9 January 2025 opposition groups including the Kataeb party, the Renewal Bloc, and the Lebanese Forces issued a joint statement in support of Aoun.

== Presidency (2025–present) ==
=== Election ===
On 9 January 2025, Aoun was elected president in the second round of the electoral session, with 99 votes out of the 128. In his inaugural address, he vowed to fight the mafias, drug trafficking, interference in the justice system, corruption, poverty, and sectarianism. He also stated that he would promote economic, political, and judicial reform. He also said: "The Lebanese state – I repeat the Lebanese state – will get rid of the Israeli occupation", while also vowing that he would work "to affirm the state's right to a monopoly on the carrying of arms".

His election was criticized by some opposition members as unconstitutional who argued that the Lebanese constitution bars a sitting army commander from being elected president as stated in article 49 of the constitution, a ban that has been waived multiple times, which prompted some MPs to place a protest vote.

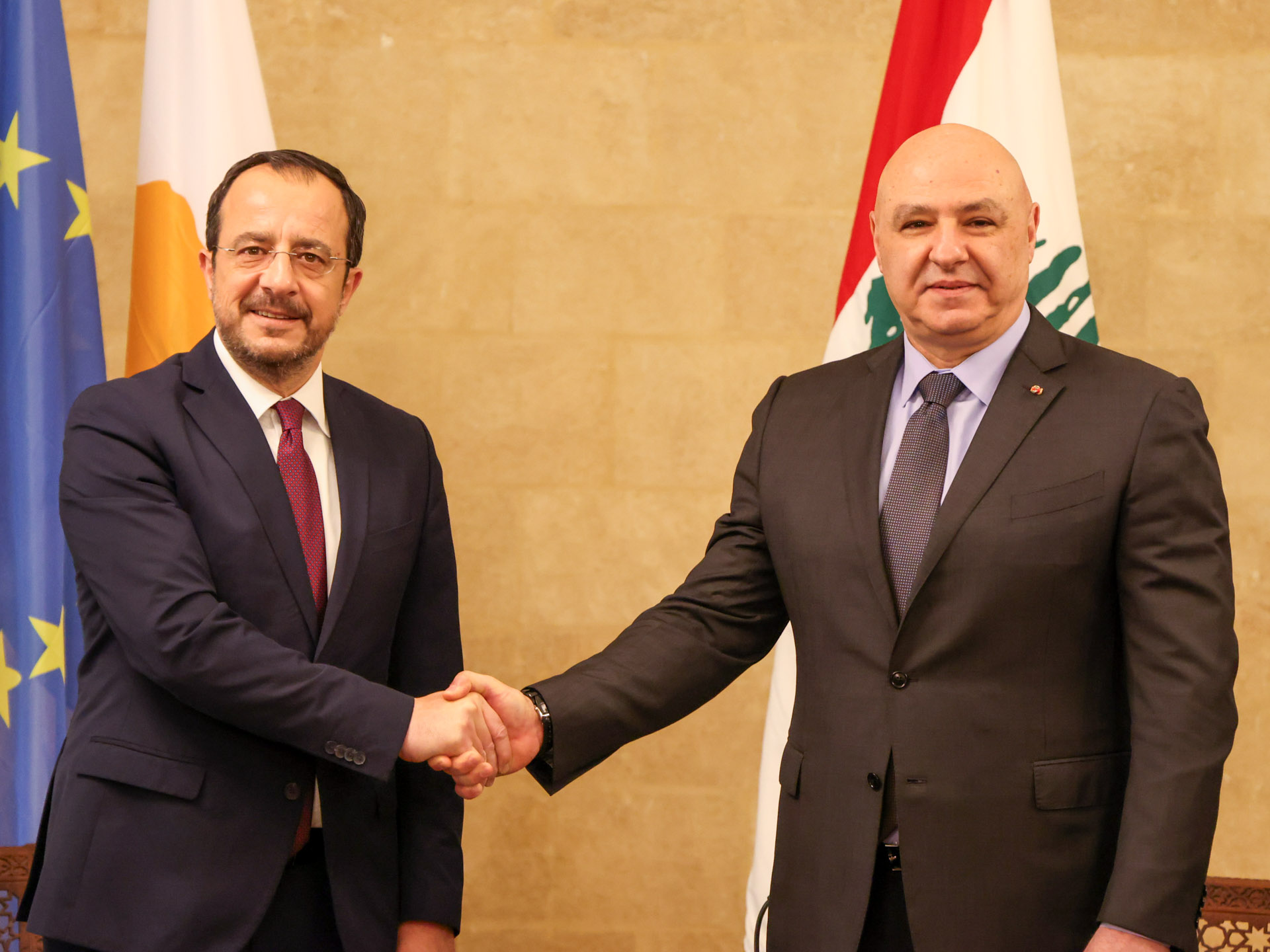
Aoun meeting with Nikos Christodoulides, president of Cyprus, a day after Aoun's appointment.

=== Inaugural speech ===
After Joseph Aoun was elected President of Lebanon, he delivered a speech before the Lebanese Parliament, expressing his positions on several key issues for the country and outlining commitments for the future, including:

- Judicial independence, improving the work of public prosecutions, conducting judicial appointments based on integrity and competence, and strengthening the Judicial Inspection Authority.
- Separation of powers and oversight, rejecting laws and decrees that do not serve the public interest.
- Appointing a prime minister to ensure the continuity of public services, prioritizing national unity over sectarianism, and embracing global progress rather than being trapped in past conflicts.
- Restructuring public administration, rotating senior public positions, and appointing regulatory bodies to restore the state's authority and uphold the dignity of civil servants.

Aoun also addressed controversial issues among the Lebanese people, such as:

- Affirming the state's exclusive right to bear arms, emphasizing that military power should remain in the hands of the Lebanese Army.
- Establishing strong relations with Arab nations and forming strategic partnerships with the Levant, the Persian Gulf, and North Africa. He also called for serious dialogue with Syria to address unresolved matters, particularly border control in both directions and non-interference in each country's internal affairs, as well as resolving the Syrian refugee crisis.
- Maintaining openness to both East and West, forming alliances, and strengthening Lebanon's foreign relations with friendly nations and the international community.

=== Cabinet of Nawaf Salam ===
In one of his first acts as president, Aoun nominated Nawaf Salam, the head of the International Court of Justice, as Prime Minister of Lebanon after winning the majority of votes by the members of parliament. Hezbollah's parliamentary leader Mohammad Raad stated that Hezbollah "extended its hand" by helping to secure Aoun's election only to find the "hand cut off" accusing the opposition of fragmentation and exclusion from power in Lebanon. Salam and Aoun's election is seen as a manifestation of Hezbollah's diminished influence in Lebanese politics, partly due to the group's military and financial losses in the conflict with Israel and the fall of the Assad regime in Syria. Aoun formally appointed Salam as Prime Minister on 8 February 2025.

==== Disarming of Hezbollah ====
Hezbollah, facing regional pressures and internal challenges, expressed willingness to discuss its disarmament, contingent upon Israel's withdrawal from contested territories in southern Lebanon and the cessation of military strikes. Aoun emphasized direct talks between the presidency and Hezbollah to establish "modalities" for transferring weapons to state control. He stated that he aims to make 2025 the year of "state monopoly on arms". The Lebanese Army, under Aoun's direction, was tasked with confiscating weapons and dismantling unauthorized military facilities in southern Lebanon. This is in line with the ceasefire agreement following the 2024 Israel-Hezbollah conflict, which requires the army to extend state authority and remove all unauthorized arms caches and outposts, regardless of the group controlling them.

In his speech on July 31, 2025 in honor of the Lebanese Army’s 80th anniversary, he addressed all parties emphasizing the historic opportunity for the disarmament of Hezbollah, while restoring and reinforcing state sovereignty. During the visit of Ali Larijani, secretary of Iran’s Supreme National Security Council, Aoun expressed his thoughts telling Larijani that Lebanon rejects any foreign intervention in its domestic affairs. Only Lebanon and its army are responsible for the state.

==== 2026 Lebanon war ====
On March 2, 2026, Hezbollah launched attacks on Israel in retaliation for the Israeli attacks on Iran, causing Israel to conduct airstrikes against the organization in Lebanon, sparking the 2026 Lebanon war. He condemned the attacks of Hezbollah on Israel, saying they undermine Lebanon’s efforts to avoid dangerous confrontations and pull the country into broader regional wars. He later stated that a recent cabinet decision gives the Lebanese state sole authority over war and peace matters, prohibiting any illegal military or security actions. He stated that the Lebanese Army and security forces are tasked with enforcing this decision nationwide. Aoun also urged the Quintet committee to pressure Israel to stop attacks on Lebanon and reaffirmed Lebanon’s commitment to ceasefire provisions while expressing readiness to resume negotiations with civilian and international involvement. On a CNN interview in early June 2026, Aoun said that the Lebanese people are fed up with war between Hezbollah and Israel. He then continued and said that he will do whatever it takes to cease Iran's use of Lebanon as a bargaining chip against Israel and the US. “It’s not your country, it’s our country,” he said addressing the IRGC.

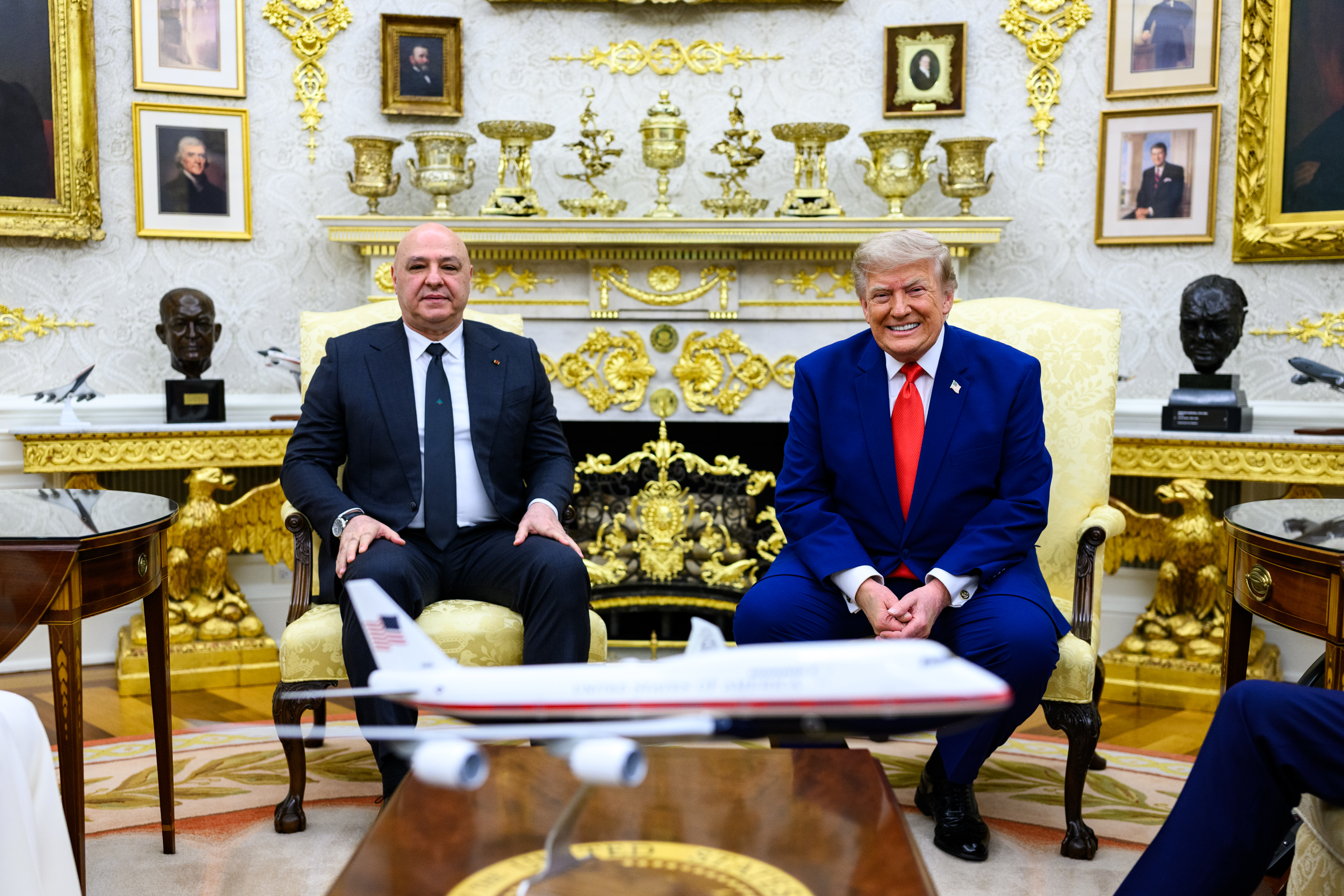
Aoun along with U.S. President Donald J. Trump in the Oval office, 21 July 2026

President Aoun will meet President Trump on July 21, 2026. His main goal will be to secure American investment, although Washington will demand that he disarm Hezbollah, according to The Economist. "It will struggle to attract donors and investors unless it defangs Hizbullah, yet its strategy for doing so relies on those same donors and investors," referring to the Lebanese government. "Untangling the knot will mean doing everything at once—disarmament, reform and reconstruction—in a country that has long struggled to do anything at all."

== Personal life ==
Aoun is married to Nehmat Nehmeh. They have two children, Khalil and Nour. He is fluent in Arabic, French and English.

His son, Khalil Aoun, is a former basketball player, having played in his career for Antranik, Champville, Hoops Club and Louaize. He has since transitioned to a role in basketball management and was appointed as the team manager for Sagesse Club for the 2025/2026 season.

He is not related to Michel Aoun, his predecessor as both President of Lebanon and Commander of the Lebanese Armed Forces, although both are Lebanese Maronite Christians and share the same surname. Under the National Pact, the President and the Commander of the Lebanese Armed Forces are always selected from the Maronite community.

== Honors ==
Ribbon	Description	Notes	Ref.
	War Medal	Three-time recipient	
	Medal of the Wounded	Two-time recipient	
	Medal of National Unity		
	Medal of the "Dawn of the South"		
	Military Valour Medal, Silver		
	Grand Cordon of the National Order of the Cedar	automatic upon taking presidential office, previously decorated as Officer and Knight of the Order	
	Extraordinary Class of the Order of Merit	automatic upon taking presidential office, promoted from 1st Class, and before that from 2nd Class and 3rd Class	
	Officer of the Legion of Honour (France)		
	Collar (Athir Class) of the National Order of Merit (Algeria)		
Military Order of Oman - 1st Class	Collar of the Order of Oman, Military class (Oman)		

== Notes ==
Military offices
Preceded by Jean Kahwaji	Commander of the Lebanese Armed Forces; 2017–2025	Succeeded by Hassan Audi as Acting commander
Political offices
Preceded by Michel Aoun	President of Lebanon; 2025–present	Incumbent
