= Michel Suleiman =

President of Lebanon from 2008 to 2014

His Excellency Michel Suleiman OM ONC OSC
- ميشال سليمان
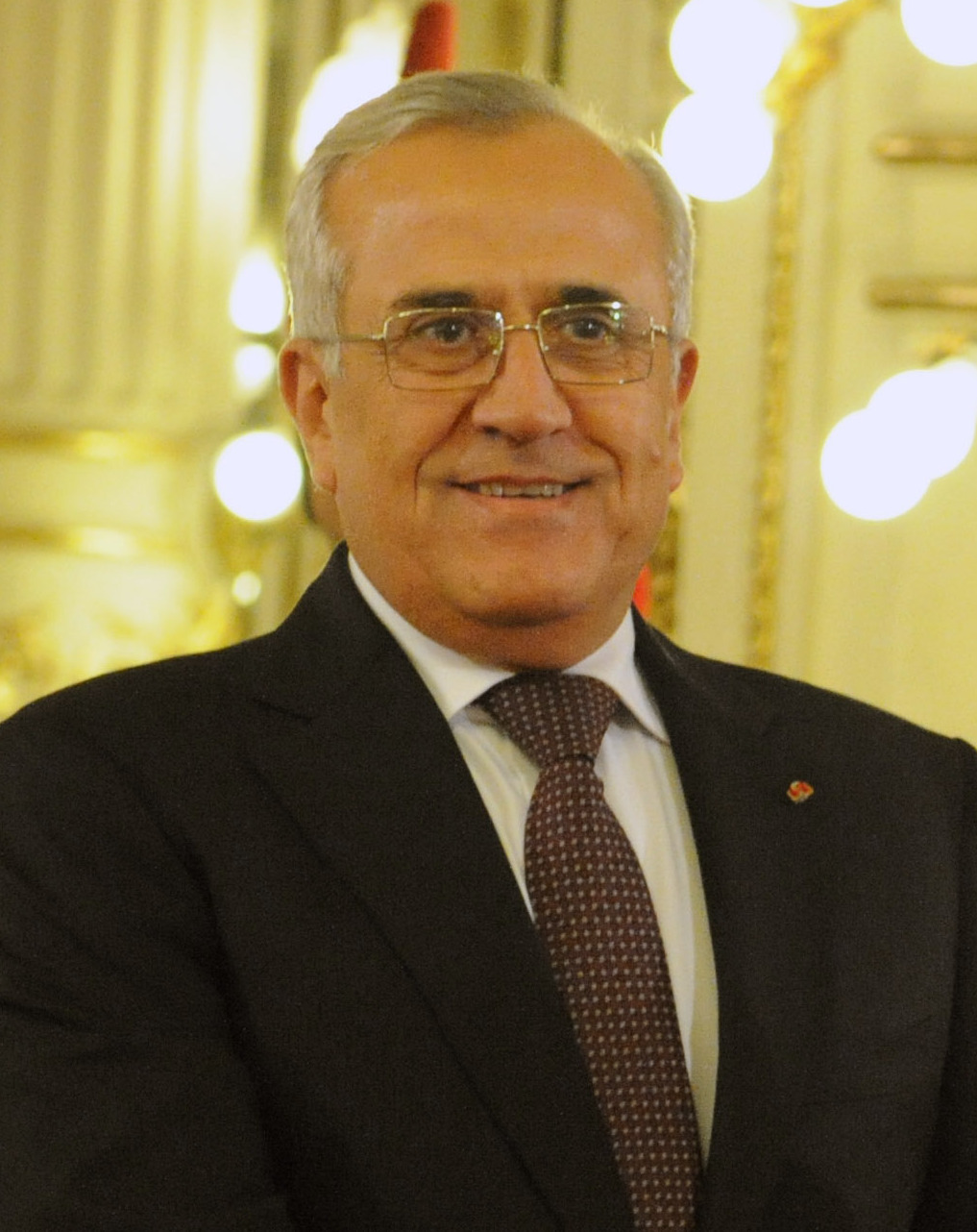
- Suleiman in 2009

12th President of Lebanon
- In office 25 May 2008 – 25 May 2014
- Prime Minister: Fouad Siniora; Saad Hariri; Najib Mikati; Tammam Salam
- Preceded by: Émile Lahoud (2007)
- Succeeded by: Michel Aoun (2016)

12th Commander of the Armed Forces
- In office 21 December 1998 – 30 August 2008
- Preceded by: Émile Lahoud
- Succeeded by: Jean Kahwaji

Personal details
- Born: 21 November 1948 (age 77) Amchit, Lebanon
- Party: Independent
- Spouse: Wafaa Sleiman (m. 1973)
- Children: 3
- Education: Lebanese Army Military Academy; Lebanese University
- Religion: Maronites

Military service
- Allegiance: Lebanon
- Branch/service: Lebanese Armed Forces
- Years of service: 1967–2008
- Rank: General
- Commands: 11th Infantry Brigade; 6th Infantry Brigade; Lebanese Armed Forces
- Battles/wars: Lebanese Civil War; Operation Dinnieh; Operation Benin; 2006 Lebanon War; Operation Nahr el-Bared

Michel Suleiman (Arabic: ميشال سليمان, Lebanese Arabic: [miˈʃeːl sʊleːˈmæːn]; born 21 November 1948) is a Lebanese politician who served as the 12th president of Lebanon from 2008 to 2014. Before becoming president, he served as commander of the Lebanese Armed Forces from 1998 to 2008.

After Lebanese Armed Forces (LAF) commander Émile Lahoud took office as president in November 1998, Suleiman succeeded him, taking his place in December. Suleiman was later elected President and was sworn into office on 25 May 2008.

== Early life and education ==
Suleiman was born in Amsheet in a Maronite Christian family on 21 November 1948. He joined the Lebanese Armed Forces in 1967 and went on to graduate from the military academy as 2nd lieutenant in 1970. He holds a Bachelor of Arts in politics and administrative sciences from the Lebanese University.

During his military career, he participated in several military training courses:

- Officer course, Military school, Lebanon, 1970
- Advanced training course, 7 January 1971 to 4 July 1971, Belgium
- Staff course, 9 February 1981 to 17 July 1981, Staff school, France
- General Command and Staff Course, Command and Staff College, starting 6 June 1988 for 52 weeks
- International Defense Management course, United States of America from 22 June 1995 to 25 July 1995

== Military career ==
During his military service, he progressed from an infantry platoon leader to a Battalion Commander, and then assumed the position of a trainer in the Military Academy and in the non-commissioned officer School. From 25 December 1990 until 21 August 1991 he was appointed as the Chief of the Intelligence Branch of Mount Lebanon. The Lebanese Army Intelligence of Mount Lebanon was after the detention of hundreds of anti-Syrian demonstrators with some cases of reported torture. On 25 August 1991 he was reassigned to the post of the Army Staff Secretary-General until 10 June 1993. He was commander of the 11th Infantry Brigade from 6 June 1993 to 15 January 1996, a period that witnessed violent confrontations with the Israeli forces in the West Beqaa Valley and South Lebanon regions. On 15 January 1996 he was appointed as commander of the 6th Infantry Brigade and remained in this position until 21 December 1998, when he was appointed as the commander of the Armed Forces. He was appointed commander-in-chief of the Lebanese army, although there were dozens of officers higher in rank and seniority. His appointment was reported to be a result of his family relations with a Syrian high-level official.

On 19 May 2007, the Lebanese Army entered into a prolonged conflict with Fatah al-Islam, a terrorist organization based in the Nahr al-Bared refugee camp in northern Lebanon. The conflict lasted until 2 September 2007 and ended with the Lebanese Army taking complete control of the camp and the complete defeat of Fatah al-Islam. 170 Lebanese soldiers, 226 members of Fatah al-Islam, and 64 civilians (mostly Palestinian refugees) were killed in the fighting. Due to a number of reasons, including balancing the interests of Lebanese citizens, concerns for the safety of Palestinian refugees, and respecting the delicate political balance that existed in Lebanon at the time, Suleiman was forced to proceed in the conflict with extreme caution and managed to do so successfully, backed by popular and political support for the LAF.

On 7 May 2008, an ongoing political crisis between government loyalists and the opposition quickly spiraled out of control when Hezbollah announced that the government's decisions to declare the group's private telecommunications network as illegal and to relieve the head of security at Beirut International Airport (an alleged Hezbollah sympathizer) of his duties amounted to a "declaration of war". Fighting immediately broke out throughout the country, with members of Hezbollah and its allies in the Amal Movement and the Syrian Social Nationalist Party quickly bearing down on their enemies in the Future Movement and the Progressive Socialist Party. The fighting lasted until 14 May 2008, when the Lebanese government canceled its two decisions after the proposition of Suleiman to do so. As the crisis ended, Suleiman was the subject of criticism by some commentators and politicians since the Army did not directly intervene in the armed clashes that took place but instead tried to separate between fighters and protected political figures. On the other hand, others defended his stance by arguing that the only way to preserve the Army's unity and prevent another civil war was to ensure that it remained uninvolved in the fighting against the Lebanese citizens.

=== Military achievements ===
- Fighting terrorism and extremism, notably through the following operations:
  - Discovering and fighting terrorist organizations in the high and barren mountains of North Lebanon in 2000, eliminating most of their members, dismantling their cells in all Lebanese regions and arresting their members.
  - Attacking the organization of Fatah al-Islam in the Nahr al-Bared refugee camp on 20 May 2007, in reaction to an armed robbery of a bank and two attacks on LAF posts nearby the camp.
- Separating anti-Syrian protests and pro-Syrian counter protests in 2005.
- Completing the Army redeployment operation all over the Lebanese territories following the withdrawal of the Syrian Armed Forces on 26 April 2005 in addition to the disturbances and security violations during the year 2007.
- Restructuring the Lebanese Army after the amendment of the military service law.
- Discovering an Israeli spying network in operation "Surprise at Dawn" on 6 June 2006.
- Offering a plan to end the 2006 Lebanon War, with a compromise solution for all parties. This plan included the planning and the preparation for the deployment of Lebanese Army in the south and on the land and sea crossover, this operation carried out accurately and faithfully and at the conclusion of the operation on the second of October, the Lebanese flag was hoisted on the hill of Labbouni adjacent to the southern border indicating the return of the Lebanese sovereignty to the south.

== Path to the presidency ==
On 23 November 2007, the term of Émile Lahoud, the 11th president of Lebanon, came to an end. At the time, the Lebanese political spectrum was deeply polarized, with virtually all parties being divided either in the government loyalists (known as 8 March camp), or the opposition (known as 14 March camp). The two camps could not come to an agreement as to who should become the country's 12th president, and so, as a result of a provision in the country's constitution, the powers of the presidency transferred to the government in the expectation that an agreement would be reached shortly afterwards.

Several names were advanced as potential candidates for the presidency, including Michel Aoun, Nassib Lahoud, Jean Obeid, amongst others, each of whom was affiliated either to 14 March or 8 March camps. It soon became apparent however that only an independent candidate would be acceptable to both sides. Suleiman was generally accepted as being the only possible candidate and as a unifying candidate. Most Lebanese commentators and policy makers agreed that Suleiman had won the trust of both the government and opposition camp, and that of most countries in the Arab region, as well as most Western countries. However, his election could not take place until a number of fundamental disagreements between 14 and 8 March camps could be resolved, including the issue of whether a government of national unity should be formed, and what specific electoral law should be passed in preparation for the parliamentary elections that were to take place in 2009. These difficulties were eventually resolved during the negotiations that took place in Doha, Qatar from 17 to 20 May 2008. The negotiations were attended by senior representatives from all of Lebanon's major political parties, and the agreement confirmed that Suleiman would be the preferred candidate in the presidential election.

When the vote was finally held in Parliament on 25 May 2008, Suleiman was elected with a majority of 118 votes out of 127. He was indirectly elected by the Lebanese Parliament, which hadn't had a session, as a result of the ongoing political crisis in the country, for 18 months. Parliament's session was attended by senior representatives from across Lebanon, the Arab region, the United Nations and the European Union, the United States, European states and many other countries. In his acceptance speech which was welcomed by all political figures across the country, the Arab region and the rest of the world, Suleiman spoke of "uniting and working towards a solid reconciliation of the country. We have paid dearly for our national unity. Let us preserve it hand-in-hand". He also made reference to the long-standing crisis between the country's two main political camps when he said that "the people have given us their confidence to fulfill their aspirations, not to afflict them with our petty political disputes".

== Presidency ==
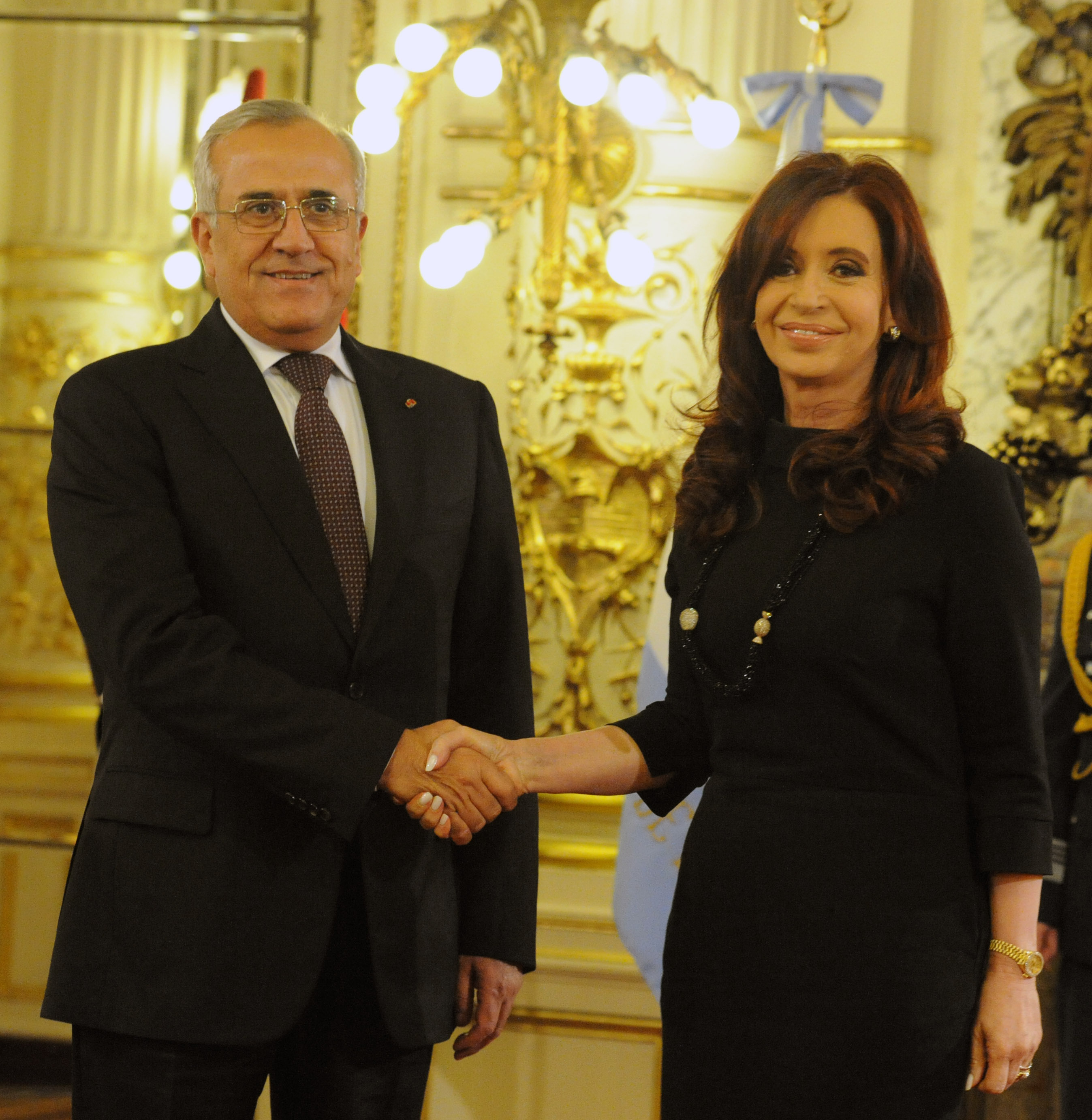
Michel Sleiman meeting Argentine President Cristina Kirchner in the Casa Rosada, October 2012

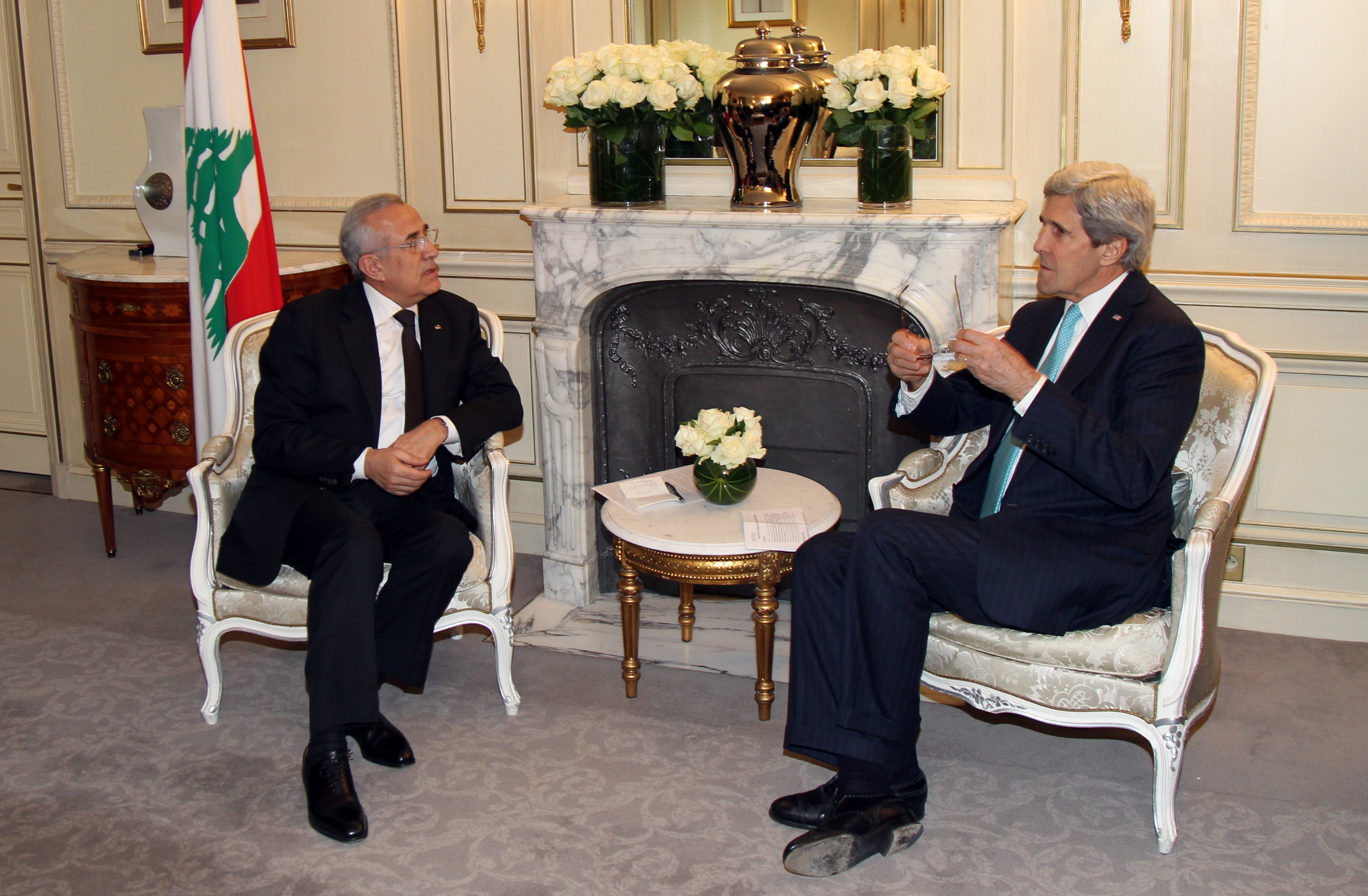
Suleiman meeting with U.S. Secretary of State John Kerry in Paris, 5 March 2014

On 28 May 2008, President Suleiman reappointed Fouad Siniora as prime minister. Siniora was the parliamentary majority's candidate for the position, and Suleiman appointed him in accordance with the country's Constitution and with a majority of 68 MPs who named him.

Shortly after assuming the presidency, Suleiman departed from tradition when he asked that posters bearing his likeness be removed from public display despite the fact that he thanked "citizens, institutions, municipalities and cultural organizations for the outpouring of support and affection".

The priorities of Suleiman's presidential term were set out clearly, notably national reconciliation; affirming Lebanon's active role as a message of dialogue and conviviality; protecting the country's independence, unity and territorial integrity; providing security and favorable conditions for economic and social growth; reinforcing constitutional institutions; fighting terrorism; implementing international resolutions related to Lebanon; opposing any form of settlement for Palestinian refugees on the Lebanese territories.

Suleiman launched the table of national dialogue at the Presidential Palace in Baabda on 16 September 2008, in pursuance of the Doha Agreement's articles, and in view of consolidating National Reconciliation and Entente.

Parallel to local issues, Suleiman exchanged visits with heads of friendly countries, and took part in the work of regional and international organizations, especially the United Nations, in order to consecrate Lebanon's rights and defend its supreme interests.

On Mary McAleese's final overseas visit as President of Ireland, she met Suleiman at the Presidential Palace in Baabda. His presidency term came to its conclusion on 25 May 2014 amid no internal or foreign consensus on who would be elected as the next president of the Lebanese Republic. Lebanon remained without a president until Michel Aoun was elected on 31 October 2016.

== Decorations, medals, awards and honors ==
=== National honours ===
- Knight and Grand Cordon of the National Order of the Cedar
- Extraordinary Class of the Lebanese Order of Merit
- 1st Class of the Lebanese Order of Merit
- 2nd Class of the Lebanese Order of Merit
- 3rd Class of the Lebanese Order of Merit

=== Military honours ===
- Decoration of Military Pride, silver grade
- Medal of War
- Decoration of Military Valor, silver grade
- Decoration of the National Unity
- Decoration of the Dawn of the South
- Certificate of Honor of the Arab Union
- Decoration of Arab Union for Military Sports, 2nd degree (commander)
- Military Medal
- Internal Security forces' Medal
- General Security Medal
- State security Medal
- Commemorative Medal of Conferences for the year 2002
- Citations of the Armed Forces Commander, 4 times – Felicitations of the Armed Forces Commander, 18 times – Felicitations of the Brigade Commander, once

=== Foreign honours ===
- Brazil :
  - Collar of the Order of the Southern Cross - 2010
  - Grand Cross of the Order of Rio Branco - 2010
- Cyprus :
  - Grand Collar of the Order of Makarios III - 2010
- France :
  - Grand Cross of the National Order of the Legion of Honour - 2009
- Greece :
  - Grand Cross of the Order of the Redeemer
- Ivory Coast :
  - Grand Cross of the National Order of the Ivory Coast - 2013
- Kuwait :
  - Collar of the Order of Mubarak the Great - 2009
- Monaco :
  - Grand Cross of the Order of Saint Charles - 13 January 2011
- Qatar:
  - Collar of the Order of the Independence - 2010
- Russia :
  - Medal from the Defense Ministry of the Republic of Russian Federation - 2007
- Saudi Arabia:
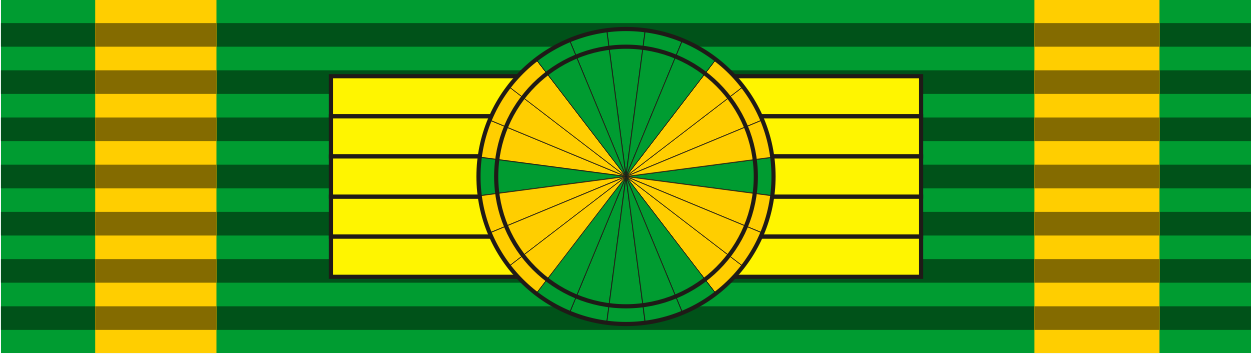
  - Collar of the Order of Abdulaziz Al Saud - 2008
- Senegal:
  - Grand Cross of the National Order of the Lion - 2013
- Spain :
  - Collar of the Order of Isabella the Catholic - 21 October 2009
- SMOM :
  - Collar of the Order pro Merito Melitensi - 2009
- Syria :
  - Member 1st Class of the Order of the Umayyads - 2010
  - Syrian Order of Merit, grade of excellence – 2010
- Ukraine :
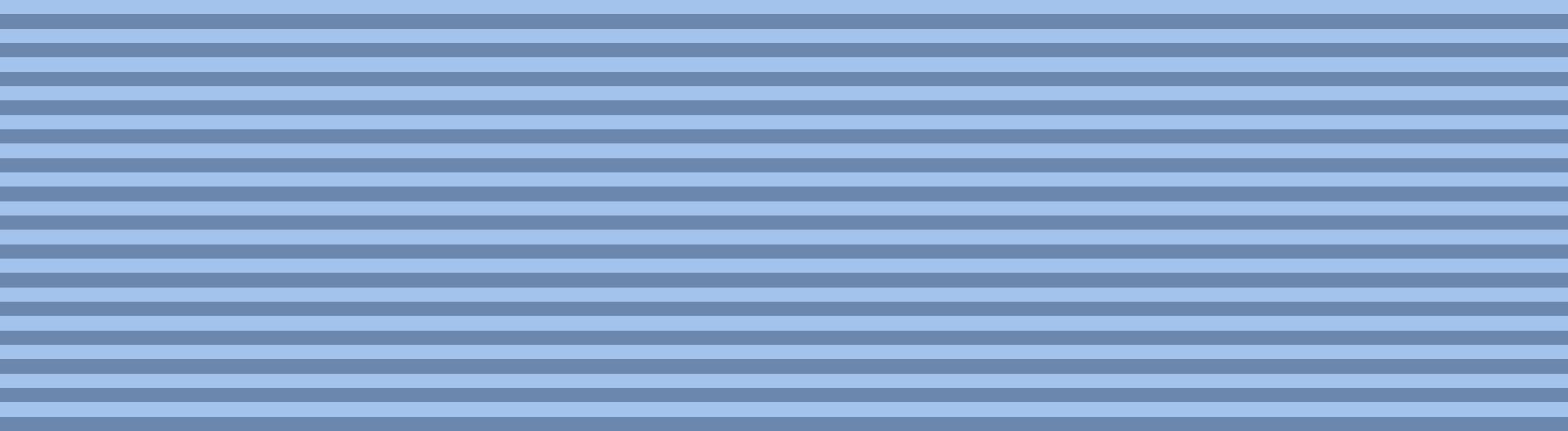
  - Order of Prince Yaroslav the Wise (4th Classes) – 2002
- United Arab Emirates :
  - Collar of the Order of Zayed - 10 February 2009

=== Honorary Degree ===
- Russia : Doctorate Honoris Causa from the Moscow State Institute for International Relations (MGIMO)- 2010
- Argentina : Doctorate Honoris Causa from the National University of the Third of February in Buenos Aires (UNTREF) – 2012
- see his international decorations

== Personal life ==
Michel Suleiman is married to Wafaa Suleiman and has three children: Rita, a dentist born in 1975, Lara, an architect born in 1978 and Charbel, a doctor born in 1983. His mother tongue is Arabic and he is also fluent in both French and English. He is a Maronite Christian.

Military offices
Preceded by Émile Lahoud	Commander of the Armed Forces; 1998–2008	Succeeded by Jean Kahwaji
Political offices
Preceded by Fouad Siniora; Acting	President of Lebanon; 2008–2014	Succeeded by Tammam Salam; Acting
