= Sixth Extraordinary Session of the Islamic Summit Conference =

Sixth Extraordinary Session of the Islamic Summit
- 13 December 2017
- Host country: Turkey
- Cities: Istanbul

The Sixth Extraordinary Session of the Islamic Summit was a conference organized by the Organisation of Islamic Cooperation (OIC) in Istanbul on 13 December 2017. This summit resulted "Istanbul Declaration on Freedom for Al Quds."

== Background ==
The summit was mainly organized in response to American president Donald Trump's recognition of Jerusalem as Israel's capital and plan to move the US embassy from Tel Aviv to Jerusalem.

== Participants ==
57 representatives of 57 member states of the Organization of Islamic Cooperation attended the summit, with 30 of 57 representatives are heads of state, and a specially invited head of state President Nicolás Maduro of Venezuela. Amongst the heads of state were host leader Turkish president Recep Tayyip Erdoğan, Palestinian president Mahmoud Abbas, Jordan's King Abdullah II; Lebanese president Michel Aoun, Iranian president Hassan Rouhani, Qatari emir Hamad bin Khalifa Al Thani, Pakistani prime minister Shahid Khaqan Abbasi and Bangladesh president Mohammad Abdul Hamid.

== Discussions ==
Discussions focused on condemning the decision of President Trump on Al Quds (or Jerusalem) and defending the Palestinian Cause and Al Quds for the whole humanity. The Trump decision violated the international law as well as the UN resolutions with the UNSC resolution 478 on Jerusalem and disregards the historical, social and cultural facts of the Holy City.

== Conclusion ==
The summit was closed with a final communique for more unity among Muslim countries in the joint decision of the summit concerning about condemnation of President Trump decision on Al Quds, and the illegal settlement in the occupied Palestinian territories, and strengthen the commitment to safeguarding the rights of the Palestinians in Al Quds. The summit also made a declaration to recognize East Jerusalem as Palestinian capital.

== Reactions ==
- Israel: Prime Minister Benjamin Netanyahu said "all these statements fail to impress us" in response to the declaration made by 57 representatives during the Muslim nations meeting.
- Turkey: President Recep Tayyip Erdoğan urged other countries outside OIC to recognize the State of Palestine, and added that Jerusalem is a 'red line' for Muslim who will reject any aggression on the Islamic sanctuaries. He also criticized Israel, calling it a terrorist state. After the summit, he planned to open a Turkish embassy in East Jerusalem, presumably a Palestinian one.
- Palestine: President Mahmoud Abbas said that Donald Trump had committed the "greatest crime" with his declaration, and the Palestinians reject any role of the United States in peace talks with Israel.
- Iran: President Hassan Rouhani stated that "the United States is only seeking to secure the maximum interests of the Zionists and has no respect for the legitimate rights of Palestinians." He also criticized the United States, describing it as not being honest in mediating peace negotiations. On 27 December, the Iranian parliament voted for a bill that recognized Jerusalem as the capital of Palestine.
