= Commander of the Lebanese Armed Forces =

Head of the armed forces of Lebanon

- قائد الجيش اللبناني
- Emblem of the Lebanese Armed Forces

- Flag of the Lebanese Armed Forces

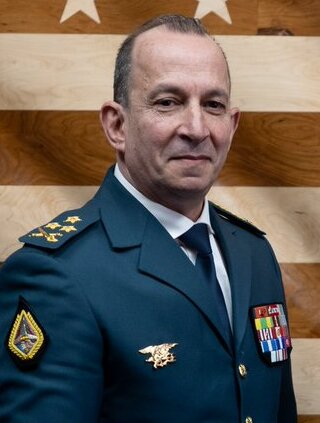
- Incumbent; Rodolphe Haykal since 13 March 2025
- Ministry of Defense
- Reports to: Minister of Defense
- Seat: Yarze
- Appointer: President of Lebanon
- Formation: 1 August 1945
- First holder: Fouad Chehab

The Commander of the Lebanese Armed Forces (Arabic: قائد الجيش اللبناني, romanized: qāʔid al-jayš al-lubnāniyy) is responsible for the operational command of the Lebanese Armed Forces (LAF). According to the Constitution, the President of Lebanon is the commander-in-chief. The commander always holds the General rank. The commander must always be a Maronite Christian according to the National Pact.

== Appointment ==
The Army Commander is appointed by general grade officers who have not yet been placed in the reserve with a decree issued from the cabinet based on the proposal of the Minister of National Defense.

== Responsibilities ==
The responsibilities of the Commander of the Lebanese Forces include:

- Organizing and managing units and bureaus and specifying their mission
- Performing operations of employment and on the alert operations when they are decided
- Implementing preparedness and mobilization operations when announced.
- Determining the need of the Army and maintaining the state of equipment and supplies upon their delivery from the General Administration
- Commanding military operations

== List of officeholders ==
No.	Portrait	Name (Birth–Death)	Term of office			Ref.
No.	Portrait	Name (Birth–Death)	Took office	Left office	Time in office	Ref.
1	Fouad Chehab	Major General; Fouad Chehab (1902–1973)	1 August 1945	22 September 1958	13 years, 52 days	
2	Toufic Salem [ar]	Major General; Toufic Salem (1904–1978)	9 October 1958	31 January 1959	114 days	
3	Adel Shehab [ar]	Major General; Adel Shehab (1903–1980)	1 February 1959	30 June 1965	6 years, 149 days	
4	Emile Boustany	General; Emile Boustany (1909–2002)	1 July 1965	6 January 1970	4 years, 189 days	
5	Jean Njeim	General; Jean Njeim (1915–1971)	7 January 1970	24 July 1971	1 year, 198 days	
6	Iskandar Ghanem	General; Iskandar Ghanem (1911–2005)	25 July 1971	9 September 1975	4 years, 46 days	
7	Hanna Saïd	General; Hanna Saïd (1923–1998)	10 September 1975	27 March 1977	1 year, 198 days	
8	Victor Khoury	General; Victor Khoury (1929–2017)	28 March 1977	7 December 1982	5 years, 254 days	
9	Ibrahim Tannous	General; Ibrahim Tannous (1929–2012)	8 December 1982	22 June 1984	1 year, 197 days	
10	Michel Aoun	General; Michel Aoun (born 1935)	23 June 1984	27 November 1989	5 years, 157 days	
11	Émile Lahoud	General; Émile Lahoud (born 1936)	28 November 1989	23 November 1998	8 years, 360 days	
12	Michel Suleiman	General; Michel Suleiman (born 1948)	21 December 1998	30 August 2008	9 years, 253 days	
13	Jean Kahwaji	General; Jean Kahwaji (born 1953)	30 August 2008	8 March 2017	8 years, 190 days	
14	Joseph Aoun	General; Joseph Aoun (born 1964)	8 March 2017	9 January 2025	7 years, 307 days	
–	Hassan Audi	Major General; Hassan Audi (born 1968); Acting	9 January 2025	13 March 2025	63 days	
15	Rodolphe Haykal	General; Rodolphe Haykal (born 1969)	13 March 2025	Incumbent	1 year, 178 days	

== See also ==
- Lebanese Armed Forces
