= Michel Aoun =

President of Lebanon from 2016 to 2022

General Michel Aoun
- ميشال عون
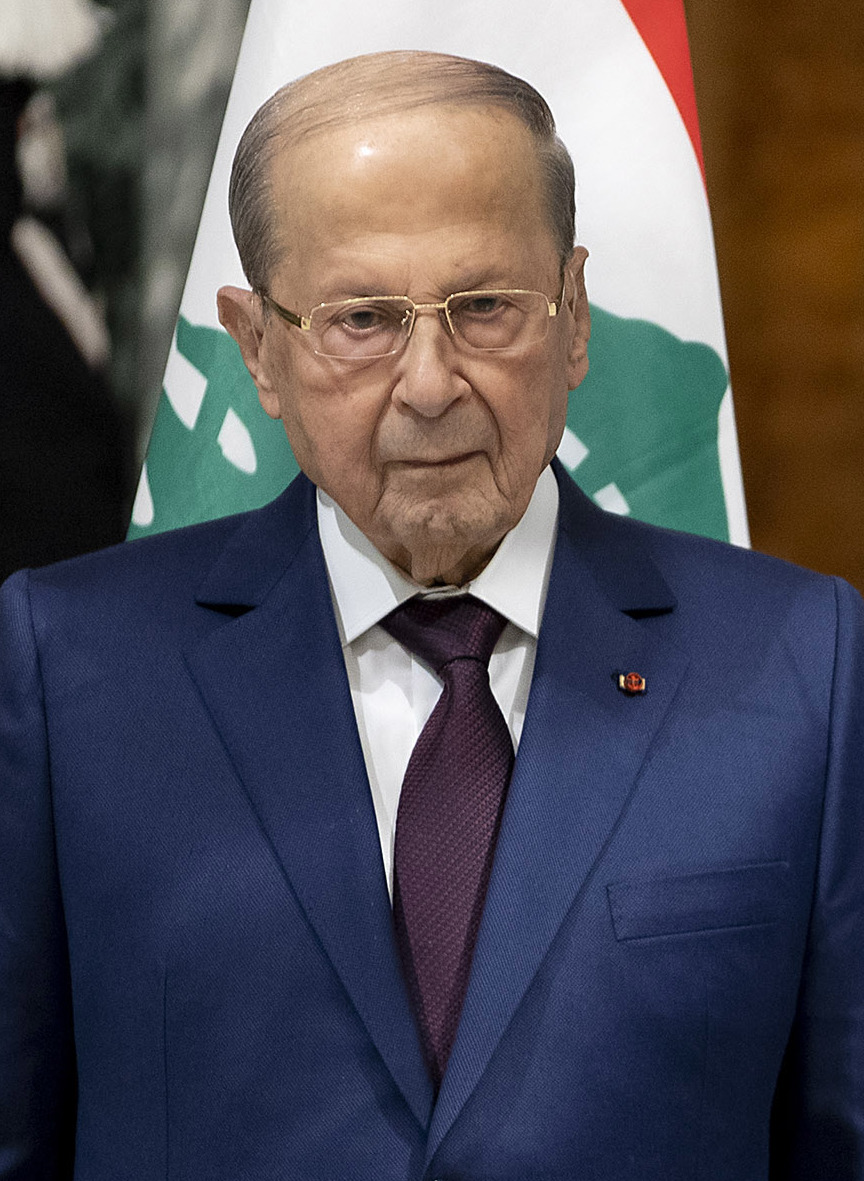
- Aoun in 2022

13th President of Lebanon
- In office 31 October 2016 – 31 October 2022
- Prime Minister: See list: Tammam Salam Saad Hariri Hassan Diab Najib Mikati
- Preceded by: Michel Suleiman (2014)
- Succeeded by: Joseph Aoun (2025)
- Acting; 22 September 1988 – 13 October 1990^ Disputed
- Prime Minister: Himself (acting)
- Preceded by: Amine Gemayel
- Succeeded by: Elias Hrawi

Acting Prime Minister of Lebanon
- In office 22 September 1988 – 13 October 1990^^ Disputed
- President: Himself (acting)
- Preceded by: Selim Hoss
- Succeeded by: Selim Hoss

Member of Parliament
- In office 20 April 2005 – 31 October 2016
- Succeeded by: Chamel Roukoz
- Constituency: Keserwan District

10th Commander of the Lebanese Armed Forces
- In office 23 June 1984 – 27 November 1989
- President: Amine Gemayel; Himself (acting)
- Preceded by: Ibrahim Tannous
- Succeeded by: Émile Lahoud

Personal details
- Born: Michel Naim Aoun; 18 February 1935 (age 91) Haret Hreik, Beirut, Greater Lebanon
- Party: Free Patriotic Movement
- Other political affiliations: March 8 Alliance
- Spouse: Nadia El-Chami (m. 1968)
- Children: 3
- Awards: OM ONC
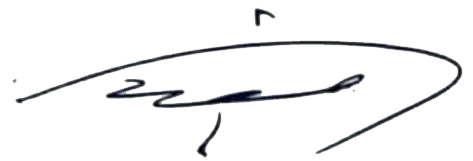
- Signature
- Nickname(s): Jebrayel, Raad The General

Military service
- Allegiance: Lebanon
- Branch/service: Lebanese Army
- Years of service: 1958–1991
- Rank: General
- Battles/wars: Lebanese Civil War
- ^Aoun's presidency was disputed by Selim Hoss, René Moawad and Elias Hrawi.; ^^Aoun's premiership was disputed by Selim Hoss.

Michel Naim Aoun (Arabic: ميشال نعيم عون, Lebanese Arabic: [miˈʃeːl naˈʕiːm ˈʕawn]; born 18 February 1935) is a Lebanese politician and former general who served as the 13th president of Lebanon from 31 October 2016 to 30 October 2022.

Born in Haret Hreik to a Maronite Christian family, Aoun joined the Military Academy in 1955 and graduated as an artillery officer in the Lebanese Army. In 1984, he became the youngest Commander of the Army, at the age of 49. On 22 September 1988, during the fourth phase of the Lebanese Civil War, the departing President Amine Gemayel appointed him as the interim Prime Minister of a military government after the parliament failed to elect a new president, and dismissed the current government headed by the Acting Prime Minister Selim Hoss. This controversial decision saw the rise of two rival governments contending for power at that time, with Aoun being supported mainly by Christians and Iraq, while the other being supported by Muslims and Syria.

Aoun declared the War of Liberation against Syrian Army forces on 14 March 1989, opposed the Taif Agreement, refused to recognize the newly elected presidents René Moawad and Elias Hrawi, clashed with the Lebanese Forces led by Samir Geagea, and survived an assassination attempt on 12 October 1990. On 13 October, the Syrian forces launched a decisive operation against Aoun, invading his strongholds including the Presidential Palace in Baabda and killing hundreds of Lebanese soldiers and civilians. Aoun fled to the French Embassy in Beirut where he declared his surrender and was later granted asylum in France where he lived in exile for 15 years.

In exile, Aoun founded the Free Patriotic Movement, and advocated for the Syria Accountability Act by testifying in the US Congress. In 2005, a chain of widespread demonstrations triggered by the assassination of Rafic Hariri erupted in Lebanon, resulted in the withdrawal of Syrian troops from the country. On 7 May, Aoun returned to Lebanon.

Aoun was elected to the Parliament for the first time in the same year, while his party won 21 seats in the parliament, forming the largest Christian bloc, and second biggest bloc in the Parliament. In 2006, he signed a memorandum of understanding with Hezbollah, starting a major alliance that has remained ever since. Despite the bloody history with the regime of Hafez al-Assad, father of Bashar al-Assad, Aoun visited Syria in 2008, ending his long rivalry with Damascus.

In 2016, Aoun reconciled with Geagea after signing the Maarab Agreement, and was endorsed by the Lebanese Forces, Future Movement, Progressive Socialist Party as well as Hezbollah to be elected the thirteenth president of Lebanon, succeeding Michel Suleiman. He was the oldest president of Lebanon to take office, at the age of 81.

In 2019, the country descended into chaos with a popular uprising, bringing millions of Lebanese in Lebanon and abroad to take to the streets, mainly caused by the liquidity crisis, political corruption and sectarianism.

== Early years ==
With family origins from Haret el Maknouniye, Jezzine, Aoun was born in the mixed Christian-Shiite suburb of Haret Hreik, to the south of Beirut. His father was Naim Aoun who worked as a butcher, while his mother was Marie Aoun, a Lebanese woman who was born in the United States. His family was generally poor.

In 1941, he was forced to leave the house where he was living, as it was occupied by British and Australian forces. He finished his secondary education at the College Des Frères Furn Al Chebbak in 1955 and finished a degree in Maths. He enrolled in the Military Academy as a cadet officer, and graduated as an artillery officer in the Lebanese Army three years later.

== Military career ==
After his graduation, Aoun joined the Second Artillery Regiment in 1958, and was sent to France to receive further military training at Châlons-sur-Marne. He finished it the following year, and was promoted to Second Lieutenant on 30 September.

He was serving during the failed coup of the Syrian Social Nationalist Party in 1961, and was decorated for that. He was trained at Fort Sill in Oklahoma, and became the Assistant of The Commander of the Second Artillery Battalion, the Commander of the Command and Service Company and Commander of the Administrative Detachment in 1970.

At the start of the civil war, Aoun was the commander of the Second Artillery Corps of the Army. He took part in the Tel al-Zaatar massacre, claiming that he developed and planned the siege of the camp and its storming. He directed the attack, which resulted in destruction of it, and the Palestinian refugees being displaced. In 1978, he went to France again for more military training at École Supérieure de Guerre.

In 1980, Aoun returned to Lebanon and was appointed later as the interim commander of the mainly Christian 8th Infantry Brigade, that is credited for protecting the Palestinian refugee camp of Borj Al Barajneh from the sinister fate of Sabra and Chatila, and fought against the pro-Syrian Druze and Palestinian militias at the Battle of Souk El Gharb during the Mountain War. During the Israeli invasion, Aoun's office was at the Museum Crossing.

He was promoted to General and appointed as the tenth Commander of the Armed Forces on 23 June 1984, succeeding General Ibrahim Tannous. At the age of 49 years, he was the youngest Commander since the establishment of the position.

According to French journalist Alain Ménargues, Aoun had strong relationships with Bachir Gemayel and Israel. He suggested that Aoun proposed to Gemayel signing a mutual recognition agreement between Lebanon and Israel along with a joint defense pact, and was accompanied by Israeli officers in his patrols. He also had a meeting with Israeli Minister of Defence Ariel Sharon.

=== Rival governments: 1988 ===
On 22 September 1988, 15 minutes before the expiration of his term, the outgoing president Amine Gemayel appointed Aoun as Prime Minister, heading a military government to be formed by six members of the Martial Court, three of which are Christian and three are Muslims. He also dismissed the civilian administration of acting Prime Minister Salim al-Huss. The Muslims refused to serve, and submitted their resignations on the next day. Gemayel accuses Syria of forcing them to do so, claiming that they accepted their roles when he contacted them. He also says that he considered forming a cabinet of judges or politicians. Having failed to form a political caretaker government, and feeling that judges "can't defend themselves", he opted for a military cabinet. Indeed, Amine Gemayel had recognized that his own nemesis throughout his presidency, the militia his slain brother Bachir Gemayel had founded, the Lebanese Forces, would also attempt to undermine the authority of a caretaker government. Backed by Syria and its local allies, Al-Hoss declared his dismissal invalid. Two governments emerged, one civilian and mainly Muslim in West Beirut, headed by Hoss as the Acting Prime Minister, the other, military and Christian, in East Beirut, led by Michel Aoun as the Interim Prime Minister. Aoun held the additional portfolio of minister of defense.

Gemayel's move was of questionable validity, as it violated the unwritten National Pact of 1943, which reserved the position of prime minister for a Sunni Muslim. Gemayel argued, however, that as the National Pact also reserved the presidency for a Maronite Christian, and as the Prime Minister assumes the powers and duties of the President in the event of a vacancy, it would be proper to fill that office temporarily with a Maronite. Gemayel referenced the historical precedent of 1952, when General Fouad Chehab, a Christian Maronite, was appointed as prime minister of a transition government following the resignation of President Bechara El Khoury.

=== Liberation war against Syria: 1989 ===
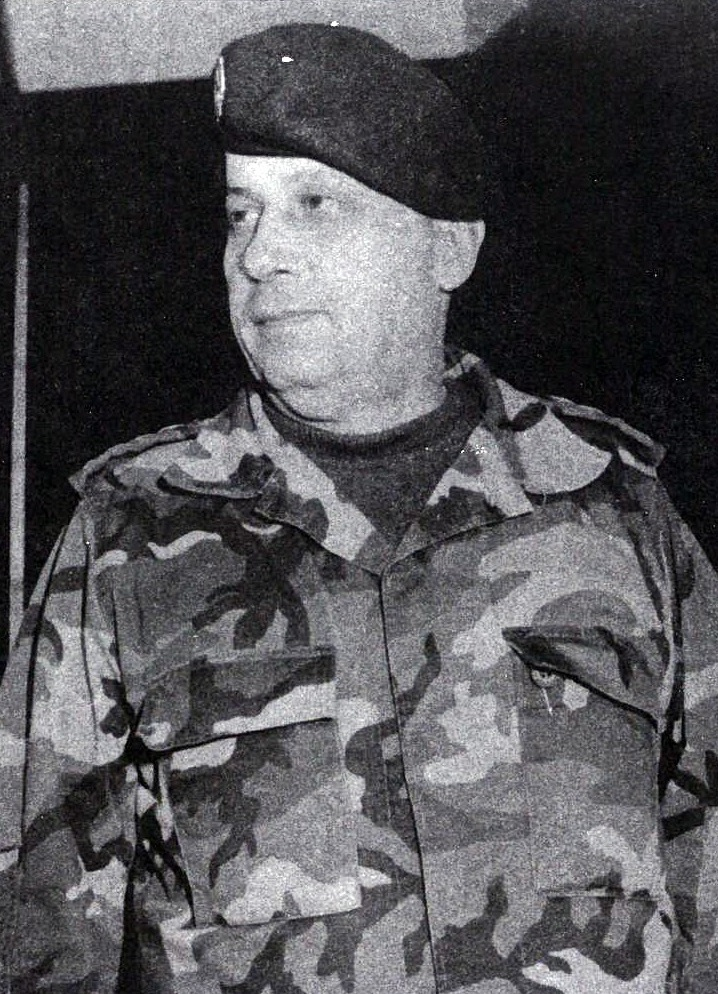
Michel Aoun during the Lebanese Civil War

On 15 February 1989 General Aoun launched an offensive, with those Lebanese Army Brigades loyal to him (30% of whom were Sunni), against Geagea's Lebanese Forces (LF) positions around Christian East Beirut. Nine days later, 24 February, with seventy people killed and the intervention of the Maronite Patriarchate the LF agreed to hand over to Aoun control of Beirut's port's fifth basin with its estimated $300,000 per month tax revenue. Suleiman Frangieh, in the north, also returned control of Ras Salaata port in Batroun District The following month, Aoun launched a blockade against the unregulated seaports south of Beirut at Jieh and Khalde. On 8 March 1989 Aoun's patrol boats intercepted a boat heading for PSP controlled port at Jieh. This precipitated a series of indiscriminate artillery barrages, with Amal shelling East Beirut harbour and Jouneh port, and Aoun's army brigades shelling Souk El Gharb. On the 12 March, Aoun ordered the closure of Beirut International Airport and two days later launched an hour-long bombardment of East Beirut, which killed 40 civilians. At the end of the month Aoun announced a ceasefire with the issue of the militia run ports unresolved. The area had seen the worst violence for three years, with over 90 people killed and several hundred wounded.

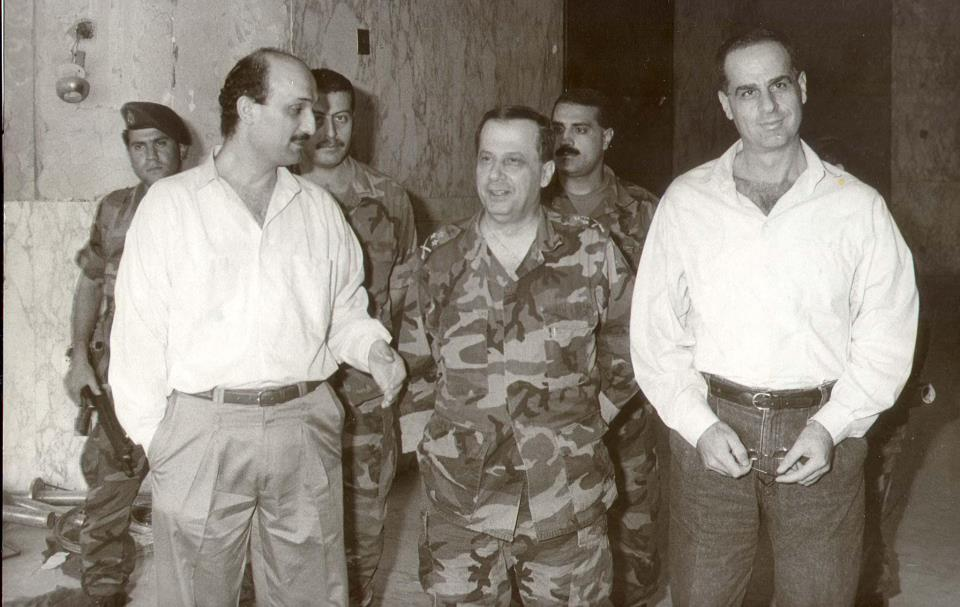
Samir Geagea (Chairman of the Lebanese Forces), Michel Aoun (Prime Minister of the military cabinet) and Georges Adwan (Vice Chairman of the Lebanese Forces) meet in Baabda Palace. 10 November 1989

In October 1989, Lebanese National Assembly members met to draw up the Taif Agreement in an attempt to settle the Lebanese conflict. This accord was later revealed to have been prepared two years earlier by Rafic Hariri. Aoun refused to attend, denounced the politicians who did so as traitors, and issued a decree dissolving the assembly. After the Taif accord was signed over his opposition, Aoun further denounced it for not appointing a date for the withdrawal of the Syrian army from Lebanon. After it signed the Taif Accord (in Taif, Saudi Arabia), the assembly met to elect René Moawad as president in November. Despite heavy-handed pressure from Syria to dismiss Aoun, Moawad relented; his presidency ended 17 days later when he was assassinated. Elias Hrawi was elected in his place. After assuming office as president, Hrawi appointed General Émile Lahoud as commander of the army and ordered Aoun out of the Presidential Palace. Aoun rejected his dismissal.

In February 1990 General Aoun launched an offensive against Samir Geagea's Lebanese Forces (LF) in East Beirut. The three months of intermittent fighting caused more destruction of property in the Christian part of Beirut than the previous 15 years of civil war. It ended with the LF remaining in control of East Beirut, the harbour and Kisrawan province. Around 1000 people were killed and both East and West Beirut left without electricity and badly damaged water supply.

The Gulf War had its repercussions on Aoun's government. Aoun had asked for help and the only unconditional help he received was from Saddam Hussein, who until 1989 was an ally of the West. On 2 August 1990, Hussein launched his invasion of Kuwait and the US established a coalition against Iraq to liberate Kuwait. President Hafez al-Assad of Syria sided with the coalition, a choice rewarded with a "green light" to crush Aoun's revolt. On 12 October 1990, Aoun survived an assassination attempt as he was addressing his supporters from his balcony. The assailant was identified as Lebanese Communist Party member, Francois Halal, emerged from the crowd wielding a pistol and shooting twice but missed him. Minutes later he continued his speech. On 13 October Syrian forces attacked the presidential palace in Baabda. The same morning, Aoun took refuge at the French Embassy, where he radioed his units to surrender to Lebanese Army Units under General Lahoud, who had pledged loyalty to Hrawi and his government.

== Exile (1990–2005) ==
=== Asylum, National Conference and FPM: 1991–2000 ===
France granted Aoun political asylum, but the Lebanese government wanted to take him to trial. After months of negotiations, he was given conditional amnesty and left to Cyprus and then to France on a French warship on 29 August 1991, where he started his exile.

On 14 July 1994, he established the Free Patriotic Movement in what he called "The National Conference".

On 27 May 2000, two days after the Resistance and Liberation Day Michel Aoun wrote an article titled "When is the Liberation?" (Arabic: متى التحرير؟) in which he said: "Till the day of actual liberation becomes a reality, we refuse to participate in festivities of freezing and leave its ecstasy for the drug addicts".

=== United States, SALSRA and testimony in congress: 2001–2004 ===
In 2001, Aoun started working with the Council of Lebanese American Organizations and the Lebanese expatriates in order to change the American public opinion regarding Lebanon. At the time, the United States supported the Syrian occupation and viewed Syria as an important factor for the stability of Lebanon.

He contacted Eliot Engel, an American representative, to propose a bill that would help ending the occupation. In July 2001, he was invited to attend a symposium on the Middle East, and after further delays from the State Department, he was granted an entry visa on 11 September, right before the same day attacks. After some hesitation about going, Aoun did travel to the United States, and met with several senators and representatives, but could not enter the congress because of the anthrax attacks. His talks did not lead to the result that he was seeking.

Although the Bush administration refused dealing with Aoun initially, they sent him a delegation of officials responsible for Lebanese affairs from the State Department, and explained the American position on the issue.

Later on, tensions grew between the United States and Syria, with the latter being accused of supporting terrorism and not standing by the United States in the War on Terror. Engel introduced the Syria Accountability and Lebanese Sovereignty Restoration Act in the House of Representatives on 12 April 2003. Aoun was invited to testify in congress, which he did on 17 September.

In his testimony, he criticized Syria in several ways. Aoun's testimony was condemned by the Lebanese Council of Ministers and pro-Syrian politicians and organizations, and he was accused of plotting with the Zionist Lobby against Lebanon, Syria and the Arab Nation.

The bill was approved by both the Senate with an 89–4 vote on 11 November, and the House with a 408–8 vote on 20 November, and was signed by President George W. Bush on 11 December.

In the same year, an avowed Aounist candidate, Hikmat Dib, came surprisingly close to winning a key by-election in the Baabda–Aley constituency against the state-sponsored candidate, Henri Helou.

=== Cedar Revolution and return to Lebanon: 2005 ===
Aoun ended 15 years of self-imposed exile when he returned to Lebanon on 7 May 2005, following the withdrawal of the Syrian Army from Lebanon after the assassination of Rafic Hariri on 14 February 2005. Hariri's killing was a catalyst for dramatic political change in Lebanon. The massive protests of the Cedar Revolution helped achieve the withdrawal of Syrian troops and security forces from Lebanon, and a change in governments, paving the way for return of Aoun to Lebanon. Aoun held a short press conference at Beirut International Airport before heading with a convoy of loyalists and journalists to the "Grave of the Un-named Soldiers and Martyrs". After praying and expressing his gratitude and blessing to the people, he went on to the grave site of former Prime Minister Rafic Hariri. Then, he visited Samir Geagea who was in the 11th year of a lifetime jail sentence, condemned for alleged and disputed responsibility for politically motivated assassinations during the 15-year civil war. His journey continued to Martyr's Square where he was greeted by supporters of the Cedar Revolution.

After his arrival, Aoun moved into a home in Lebanon's Rabieh district, where he was visited on 8 May by a large delegation from the disbanded Lebanese Front (LF), who were among Aoun's former enemies. Aoun and Sethrida Geagea, wife of the imprisoned LF leader Samir Geagea (since given amnesty), publicly reconciled. Other prominent visitors included National Liberal Party leader Dory Chamoun, Solange Gemayel, Nayla Moawad (widow of assassinated President René Moawad), and opposition MP Boutros Harb. Patriarch Nasrallah Boutros Sfeir of the Maronite community sent a delegation to welcome him, and even the Shiite Muslim Hezbollah Party sent a delegation.

== Political career ==
=== 2005 elections ===
In the election at the end of May 2005, the political leaders of the Syrian occupation imposed to run the elections with the 2000 electoral law; a law that Critics argue was implemented by Syrian intelligence chief Ghazi Kanaan and Rafic Hariri, that does not provide for a real popular representation and marginalizes many communities especially the Christian one throughout the country. Aoun opposed this electoral law choice and was fought by a quadruple alliance grouping Anti-Syrian (the Future Movement, the Progressive Socialist Party, the Lebanese Forces and some other parties) and Pro-Syrian (Amal and Hezbollah) main political parties against the Free Patriotic Movement headed by General Michel Aoun. In this context, Aoun surprised many observers by entering into electoral alliances with a number of former opponents, including some pro-Syrian politicians like Michel Murr and Suleiman Frangieh Jr.

Aoun's party, the Free Patriotic Movement, made a strong showing, winning 21 of the 58 seats contested in that round, including almost all of the seats in the Christian heartland of Mount Lebanon. Aoun also won major Christian districts such as Zahle and Metn. Aoun himself was elected to the National Assembly. The FPM failed however to win any seats in Northern Lebanon due mainly to the 2000 electoral law that gave the pro Hariri Muslim community of Tripoli an easy veto over any Christian candidate in its electoral district, thus falling short of its objective of holding the balance of power between the main "anti-Syrian" opposition coalition (formerly known to be Syria's strong allies) led by Saad Hariri (which won an absolute majority) and the Shiite-dominated Amal-Hezbollah alliance.

The FPM won 21 seats in the parliament, and formed the largest Christian bloc in Lebanon, and second biggest bloc in the Lebanese Parliament.

=== Memorandum of understanding between the FPM and Hezbollah ===
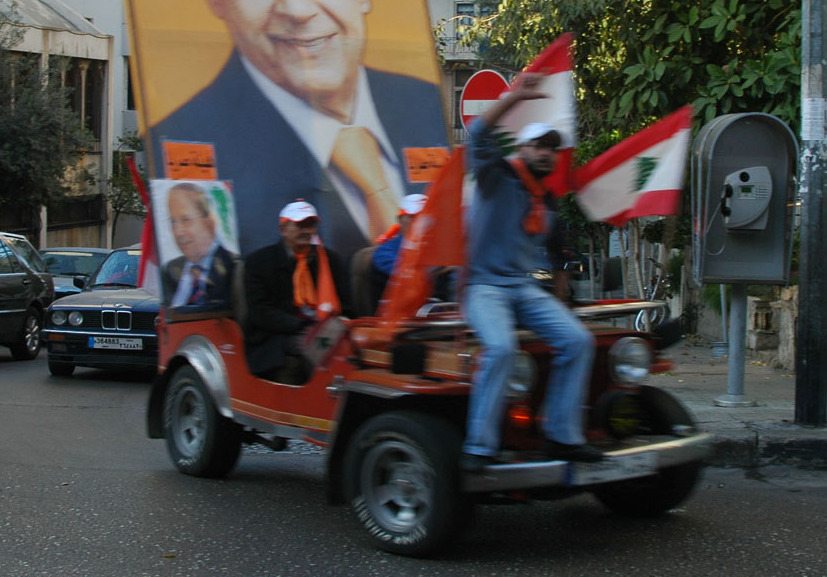
Aoun supporters in a car decorated with Aoun's portraits, 2006

In 2006, Michel Aoun and Hassan Nasrallah met in Mar Mikhayel Church, Chiyah, a venue that symbolizes Christian–Muslim coexistence as the Church, located in the heart of the mainly Muslim Beirut southern suburb, was preserved throughout the wars. The FPM signed a memorandum of understanding with Hezbollah organizing their relation and discussing Hezbollah's disarmament given some conditions. The agreement also discussed the importance of having normal diplomatic relations with Syria and the request for information about the Lebanese political prisoners in Syria and the return of all political prisoners and diaspora in Israel.

After this event, Aoun and his party became part of the March 8 Alliance.

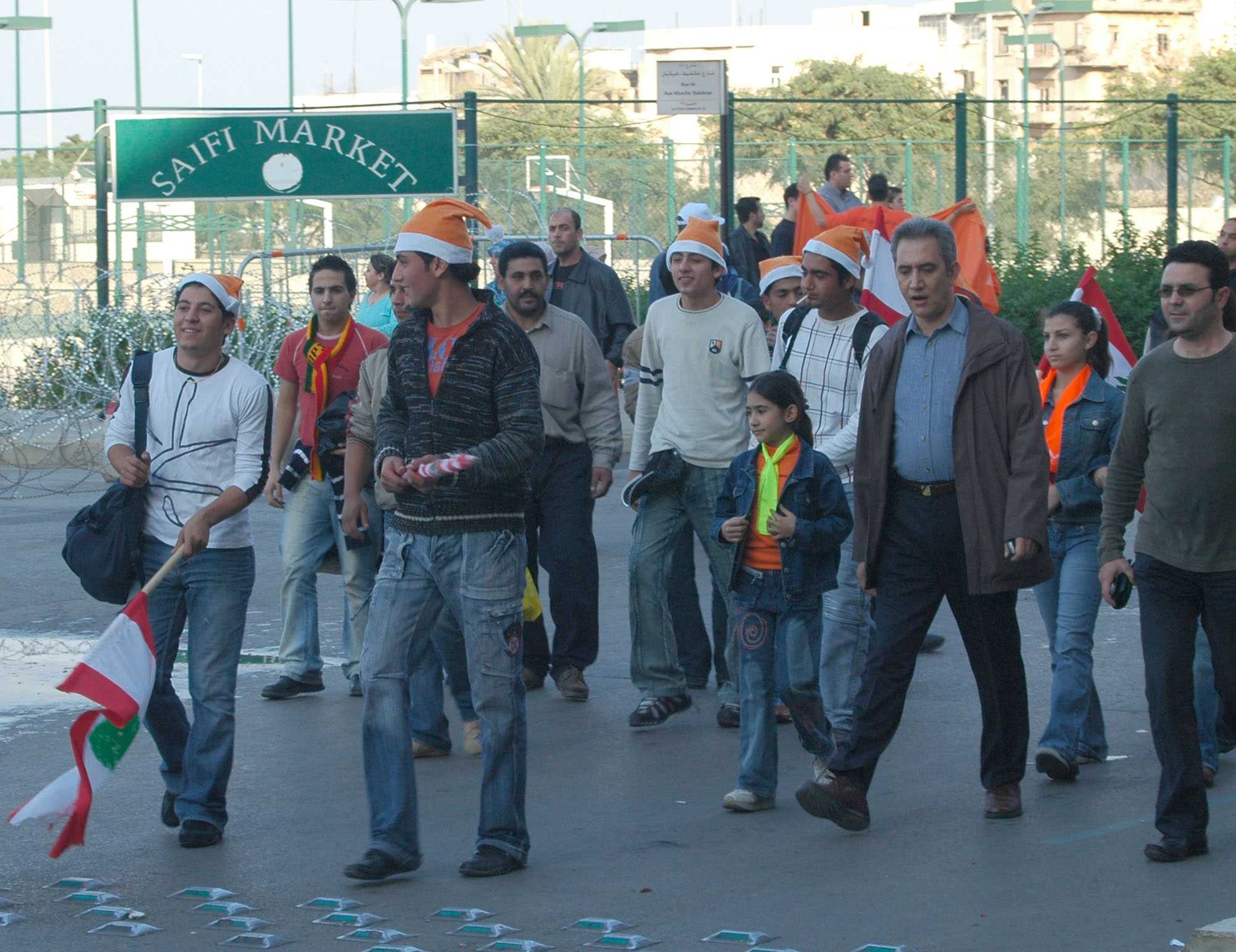
Aoun supporters wearing orange elf hats, December 10, 2006

=== Lebanese anti-government protests: 2006–2008 ===
On 1 December 2006, Michel Aoun declared to a crowd of protesters that the current government of Lebanon was unconstitutional claiming that the government had "made corruption a daily affair" and called for the resignation on the government. Hundreds of thousands of supporters of this party, the Amal Movement and Hezbollah, according to the Internal Security Forces (ISF), gathered at Downtown Beirut trying to force Fouad Siniora to abdicate.

On 11 July 2008, Aoun's party entered the Lebanese government. FPM members, Issam Abu Jamra as Deputy-Prime Minister, Gebran Bassil as Minister of Telecommunications, and Mario Aoun as Minister of Social Affairs were elected into government. It is the Movement's first participation in any Lebanese Government.

=== 2009 elections and government formation ===
The results of the 2009 elections granted the FPM 27 parliamentary seats. One of them was won by Aoun from Keserwan.

In November 2009, and after 6 months of strong political pressure by General Michel Aoun himself, by refusing any participation in the government that was inferior to the 2008 participation, Prime Minister Saad Hariri eventually gave in. The Free Patriotic Movement nominated three ministers to join the first government headed by Saad Hariri, who would receive the ministry of telecommunications, the ministry of energy and water, and the ministry of tourism.

Aoun and his allies got one third of the government, but were one minister short of having veto power. On 12 January 2011, in a move orchestrated from Aoun's house in Rabieh, the Hariri government was toppled through the resignation of the FPM ministers and their allies. On 13 June 2011, a new government headed by Prime Minister Najib Mikati saw light where Aoun's parliamentary Reform and Change Bloc assumed 10 ministries.

=== 2016 presidential candidacy ===
Lebanese Forces (LF) leader Samir Geagea and Michel Aoun turned a historic page in intra-Christian relations when the former March 14 presidential nominee officially endorsed on Monday Aoun's candidacy for the presidency. "I announce after long consideration, discussions and deliberations between members of the executive body of the Lebanese Forces, our endorsement of the candidacy of [former] General Michel Aoun for the presidency," Geagea said in joint news conference with his March 8 rival. Speaking from the LF's headquarters in Maarab where he had met with Aoun shortly before the news conference, Geagea read a 10-point understanding that summarized the key points of the Declaration of Intent struck between the LF and FPM in June.

The commitment to the implementation of the Taif Accord, the need to stop the flow of arms and militants across the Lebanese-Syrian border in both directions, the ratification of a new electoral law and compliance with international resolutions were among the key points agreed upon between the LF and FPM, Geagea said. As he read the key points of his understanding with Aoun, Geagea paused for a moment to tell a joke. With humor, the LF leader asked Aoun to urge his son-in-law Foreign Minister Gebran Bassil to act in accordance with the sixth point of their agreement. Geagea was referring to his understanding with the former general over "the need to adopt an independent foreign policy that guarantees Lebanon's interests and complies with international law." For his part, Aoun thanked Geagea for his support and said he would extend his hands to all political parties.

Geagea's official endorsement of Aoun's nomination would provide a significant boost for the former general's presidential bid but it remains unclear how the Future Movement would react to this initiative. Before his arrival to the LF's headquarters, Aoun met with Maronite Patriarch Bechara Boutros al-Rahi, who has repeatedly voiced his support for initiatives aimed at breaking the presidential deadlock. "We came to inform the patriarch of the agreement", Aoun said from the seat of the Maronite church.

Earlier in the day, Rai had met with former Prime Minister and head of the Future Movement parliamentary bloc Fouad Siniora. Following his meeting with the patriarch, Siniora stressed the need to elect a president who enjoys the support of all Lebanese factions. "We have to work hard to elect a person who can unite all Lebanese people from all political affiliations and promote coexistence among them," said Siniora. Geagea's endorsement of Aoun is the first time the country's two leading Christian parties have come together on such a pivotal issue after decades of animosity.

Geagea, the former March 14 presidential candidate, was caught by surprise when his ally Future Movement leader and former Prime Minister Saad Hariri reportedly nominated Marada Movement Chief Suleiman Frangieh Jr. for the presidency. Geagea has staunchly opposed the deal, which stirred up controversy both within the March 8 and 14 camps.

Aoun, on the other hand, had shown no signs of giving up his presidential ambitions in favor of Franjieh, a longtime ally of Hezbollah and a member of Aoun's reform and Change parliamentary bloc. For weeks Hezbollah remained silent over Hariri's proposed settlement, as Franjieh sought to win the support of its allies. Hezbollah finally broke its media silence on 29 December 2015, and reaffirmed its support for Aoun's presidential bid.

In the first official statement since Hariri's initiative emerged, Hezbollah's Politburo Chief Sayyed Ibrahim Amin al-Sayyed announced from the seat of the Maronite patriarchate that his party is committed to supporting the presidential bid of its ally Aoun. Aoun and Geagea kicked off talks a year ago. The talks culminated in a Declaration of Intent that paved the way for a surprise visit by Geagea to Aoun's residence in Rabieh in June. The Declaration of Intent has since brought Aoun and Geagea closer together, putting an end to the bitter rivalry between the Christian leaders who fought a devastating war in 1990. Lebanon's top post has been vacant since May 2014 as Lebanese politicians failed to agree on a consensus president.

On 20 October 2016, Saad Hariri declared publicly his support and that of his parliamentary block to voting Michel Aoun for president. This support increased his chances tremendously of getting elected president during the parliamentary session scheduled for 31 October.

=== Election as president ===
On 31 October 2016, Aoun was elected the president of Lebanon, ending a 29-month vacuum at the head of the state. After 45 failed attempts to achieve a parliamentary quorum for presidential elections by the Lebanese Parliament, the 127-seat chamber convened for a 46th time on 31 October under the leadership of house speaker Nabih Berri.

The first round of voting required a two-thirds majority of the house, meaning 85 votes of the 127 member chamber, but Aoun closely failed to secure the necessary votes for the round winning just 83 votes, two less than required, while there were 36 blank ballots, 6 cancelled ballots and one ballot for MP Gilberte Zouein.

The second round of voting had to be repeated three times before ballots were read out loud after the parliament's secretariat counted 128 envelopes instead of 127, which is the number of MPs who participated in the presidential election. In the second round, an absolute (50 percent plus one) majority of the quorum was needed, meaning 64 votes required for election. Eventually Aoun received 83 votes and was elected. There were 36 blank ballots in the second round, 7 ballots cancelled and 1 vote for MP Sethrida Geagea, the wife of Samir Geagea.

Forty-sixth parliamentary electoral session
First round			Second round*		Third round*		Fourth round		
Candidates	Votes	%					Candidates	Votes	%
Michel Aoun	84	66.14					Michel Aoun	83	65.35
Gilberte Zouein	1	0.78					Sethrida Tawk	1	0.78
Invalid/blank votes	42	33.06					Invalid/blank votes	43	33.85
Total	127	100	128	100.78	128	100.78	Total	127	100
Eligible voters	127	100	127	100	127	100	Eligible voters	127	100

*The second and third rounds were cancelled because there were more votes than present MPs.

Aoun was quickly sworn in as president, pledging political and economic reform and urging a "real partnership" among notoriously divided Lebanese political factions. Following the parliament session, Aoun was driven to the presidential palace in the southeastern Beirut suburb of Baabda, returning exactly 26 years after he was forced out of it as army commander and interim premier by Syrian forces.

== Presidency (2016–2022) ==
=== Second Hariri Cabinet ===
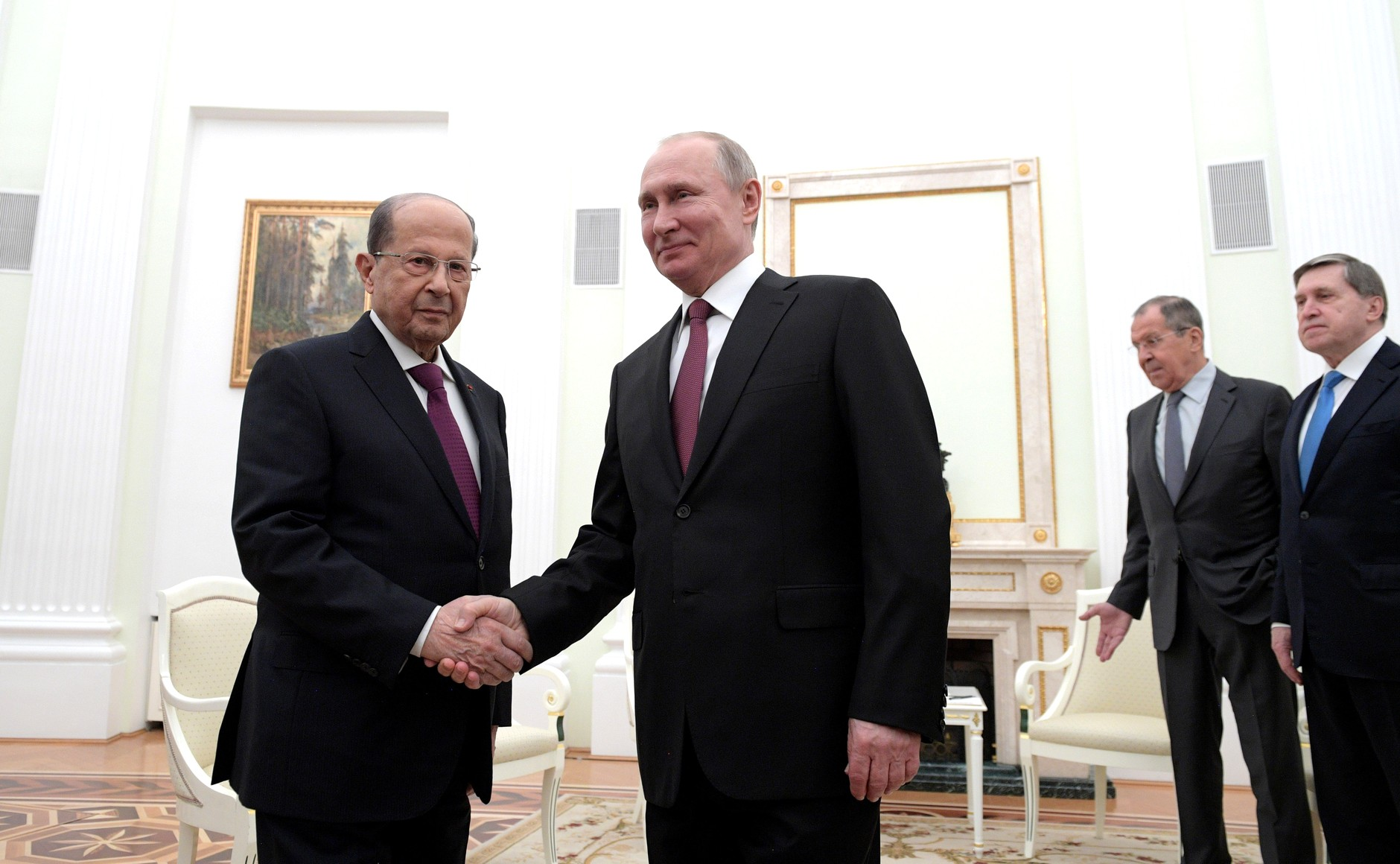
Michel Aoun meeting President Putin during his visit to Russia in 2019

After the resignation of Tammam Salam, Aoun designated Saad Hariri to form a new cabinet following binding parliamentary consultations. This came as a result of the consensus that led to the election of Aoun, and it was the second time Hariri held the position. The cabinet consisted of 30 ministers as a national unity government. On 28 December, it won the confidence of the parliament with an 87 MPs majority.

On 4 November 2017, Hariri resigned from office in a televised statement from Saudi Arabia and blamed it on Iran policies and it is "interference in the Lebanese affairs". He also described Hezbollah a threat to the security of Lebanon, and compared the situation in Lebanon with the one before the assassination of Rafic Hariri. Iran called his resignation part of a plot by the United States, Israel, and Saudi Arabia to heighten Middle Eastern tensions. The secretary general of Hezbollah Hassan Nasrallah considered this a Saudi declaration of war on Lebanon. After his 12-day stay in Saudi Arabia, Aoun informed the foreign ambassadors that he is detained there.

On 21 November, Hariri returned to Beirut to participate in the Independence Day celebrations. He decided to suspend the resignation after meeting Aoun, who told him to postpone the thing until other consultations. On 5 December, he officially withdrew his resignation.

In August 2017, Aoun signed the country's first animal protection bill into law, guaranteeing that domestic and wild animals would be legally protected from abuse.

=== Third Hariri cabinet ===
On 6 January 2019, a new Lebanese government was formed, headed by Prime Minister Saad Hariri. The government took nine months to form, following extended negotiations with various political factions. It is a national unity cabinet, and was composed of 30 ministers.

=== 2019 protests ===
Large-scale anti-government demonstrations ignited in the country from 17 October. Initially triggered in response to a rise in gas and tobacco prices as well as a new tax on messaging applications, the demonstrations quickly turned into a revolution against the stagnation of the economy, cabinet failure, unemployment, Lebanon's sectarian and hereditary political system, corruption and the government's inability to provide essential services such as water, electricity and sanitation, involving hundreds of thousands of people from every region and sect of the country.

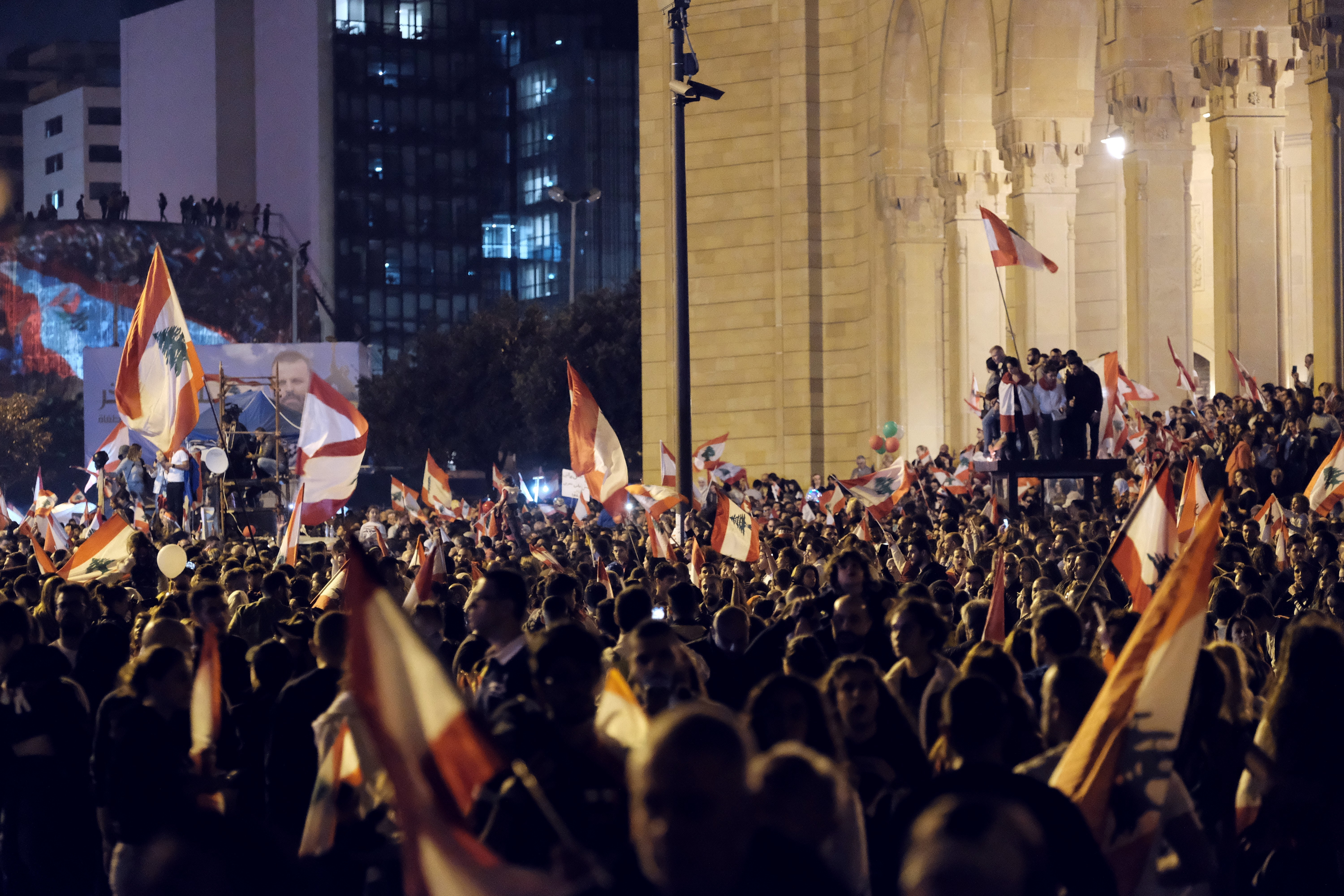
Lebanese protests in Martyrs' Square on Independence Day in 2019

President Michel Aoun addressed the population on 24 October, stating his willingness to hold a dialogue with the protesters and find the best solution forward. He supported Hariri's reforms but did confirm a need to "review the current government" within the "state institutions", and not through protesting. Hariri supported this review through Lebanon's "constitutional mechanisms", but the protesters rejected any calls for dialogue until the government has resigned.

Aoun gave a live interview at 8:30PM on 12 November, during which he rejected calls for a fully technocratic government, warned against a run on the bank further damaging the economic sector, and called for an immediate end to the protests to prevent a "catastrophe". Aoun accused protesters of "stabbing the nation with a dagger" and accused protesters that blocked roads of "violating international law". Aoun also stated that "anyone who cannot find faith in the current Lebanese government can leave Lebanon and live somewhere else". Aoun's interview proved exceedingly unpopular with the protest movement, which began blocking dozens of arterial roads in Beirut and across Lebanon. Alaa Abou Fakhr, a Lebanese national, was shot and killed in Khalde at the ensuing protests.

Protesters began appearing in the early morning of 13 November near the heavily fortified Baabda Presidential Palace to express dissatisfaction with President Aoun's speech a few hours earlier and picked up in pace as the day progressed.

==== Hassan Diab cabinet and premiership vacuum ====
Diab was appointed prime minister by President Michel Aoun following the resignation of Saad Hariri following the 2019–20 Lebanese protests, that started in October 2019. A new Lebanese cabinet led by Prime Minister Hassan Diab was formed in Lebanon on 21 January 2020, after agreement was reached by the heads of the involved political parties after nearly three months. The already delegitimized government assigned Diab and his new cabinet, despite ongoing public outrage against the new cabinet and citizen requests for a competent, independent, and technocratic government. The marketing campaign by the authoritative powers around the new cabinet were mired by supposed untruths such as Diab claiming to have met reformist representatives of the revolution but turned out to be regime supporters or the regime using the term "techno-political" to describe the new cabinet in order to justify the majority partisan appointments.

On 10 August 2020, the government resigned following public anger over the 2020 Beirut explosion on 4 August but continued to govern as a caretaker government. Aoun appointed Moustapha Adib as prime minister designate on 31 August to succeed Diab. The latter renounced to form a government on 26 September 2020, because of the dissensions between political parties concerning the attribution of the ministries. Saad Hariri later announced on October that he was "definitely a candidate" for the formation of a new government. He was again appointed President of the Council of Ministers after binding parliamentary consultations led by Michel Aoun. On 6 March 2021, while Saad Hariri has still not managed to form a government, Diab denounces the situation of political and economic crisis and threatens to stop expediting current affairs by leaving office immediately.

On 22 March, and after several meetings between Prime Minister-designate Saad Hariri and President Aoun, Hariri said that the demands of the President were "unacceptable", therefore Lebanon witnessed a failure to form a new government which will worsen the crisis. According to Hariri, President Aoun presented him with a line-up granting his team a third of all cabinet seats, which would enable them to have veto power over decision making in the Lebanese government. Hariri was said to have been criticized by Aoun for disclosing his proposed government with the media, because the distribution of the ministries was unjust which was his reason for not agreeing to the line-up, according to Al Jazeera. After the meeting which only lasted for just 35 minutes, another date for a new meeting between Hariri and Aoun could not be confirmed.

In conflict with Aoun concerning the distribution of ministerial posts, Hariri gave up on a government formation on 15 July 2021.

==== 2020 Beirut port explosion ====
On 4 August 2020, a large amount of ammonium nitrate stored at the Port of Beirut in the capital city of Lebanon exploded, causing at least 218 deaths, 7,000 injuries, and US$15 billion in property damage, as well as leaving an estimated 300,000 people homeless. A cargo of 2,750 tonnes of the substance (equivalent to around 1.1 kilotons of TNT) had been stored in a warehouse without proper safety measures for the previous six years after having been confiscated by the Lebanese authorities from the abandoned ship MV Rhosus. The explosion was preceded by a fire in the same warehouse. As of 2026, the exact cause of the explosion is still under investigation. Aoun expressed intention that the government would make up to 100 billion pounds (US$66 million) in aid available to support recovery operations. On 10 August 2020, Hassan Diab and his cabinet resigned in response to protests following the explosion. After accepting their resignation, Aoun asked the government to stay on in a caretaker capacity until a new cabinet could be formed. Aoun denied allegations of involvement; however, he did admit to being aware of the ammonium nitrate.

=== Succession ===
On 30 October 2022, a day before his six-year term ended, Aoun accepted the resignation of the government of Najib Mikati, with it remaining in office in a caretaker capacity. No successor had been elected before the end of his term, similarly to his predecessors.

== Post-presidency (2022–present) ==
In June 2023, Aoun visited Syria and met with Syrian President Bashar al-Assad, who assured that he would not interfere in the selection of the next president in Lebanon. On the thirteenth session of voting in parliament, Joseph Aoun (no relation) was elected president of Lebanon in January 2025, after a two-year vacancy.

During the Hezbollah–Israel conflict, Aoun criticized Hezbollah's decision to open a southern Lebanese front in solidarity with Gaza. In an interview with pro-Hezbollah Al Akhbar he stated, “We are not bound to Gaza by a defense treaty” and “we should not give Israel any pretext [to start a war].” After Aoun's tenure ended, relations between the Free Patriotic Movement and Hezbollah declined, especially after Hezbollah's backing of Suleiman Frangieh and the Hezbollah–Israel conflict.

In August 2025, Aoun called on Lebanese authorities to revoke refugee status for Syrians living in Lebanon. He argued that, after the fall of Assad’s government in December 2024, most Syrians no longer had a reason to remain in Lebanon and that their presence had become unlawful. He urged the government to go beyond voluntary-return programs and immediately organize repatriation programs.

In September 2026, Aoun filed a criminal complaint after reports circulated that he might be implicated in the investigation into the 4 August 2020 Beirut port explosion. He said the reports involved fabricated information, defamation, and a breach of the investigation’s confidentiality. In a post on X, he said he acted “out of respect for the blood of the victims” and to protect truth and justice.

== Political strategy ==
In an unprecedented move, Aoun signed a memorandum of understanding with Hezbollah on 6 February 2006.

Since the end of the Syrian occupation of Lebanon, General Aoun has been seeking to improve his country's relationship with Syria. He has treated all Lebanese parties as potential partners in the process of change and reform of the country. The memorandum of understanding with Hezbollah enters in this context.

In September 2015, Aoun sponsored the candidacy of his son-in law, Foreign Minister Gebran Bassil, to the FPM leadership post. Bassil was elected by acclamation after his main contender, MP Alain Aoun (Michel's nephew), was convinced to quit the race.

== Political views and relations ==
=== Western world ===
Aoun explained why he turned back on the Western world and forged an alliance with the Axis of Resistance in a speech in May 2008 by saying:

We chose this long-term political option, because we knew that the interests of the West do not lie with us. Its interests lie with Israel, on one hand, and with the oil, on the other hand. We are not included among its interests at present. The only thing it cares about is resolving the problem of Israel at our expense, through the naturalization of the Palestinians in Lebanon, and pleasing the oil-producing countries, because its material interests lie there. Therefore, we had to choose a policy of coordination with all elements of Lebanese society, and with our neighboring countries, in order to build strong, solid, and mutual relations. Lebanese society in general, and the Christians in particular, are not used to this, and therefore, it has aroused fear and concern. However, our confidence in ourselves, in the choice we made, and in our views have made it possible for us to stand before you, and to ask you to give the efforts we are undertaking a chance. A short while ago, in Doha, we saw the results. All the Christians in the Middle East, all the Christians in the Middle East are fleeing, while the Christians of Lebanon are returning. The forecasts of the entire world. For 25–35 years, we have been reading that the Christians in the Middle East are becoming extinct. Western policies have led the Christians in the Middle East towards extinction. Western policies have not left a single Christian in Palestine and the holy places. Western policies have not left a single Christian in Iraq. They intended to get rid of us by marginalizing us, and by treating us as a superfluous element in society.

=== Iran and Hezbollah ===
Aoun's political bloc has formed a significant alliance with Hezbollah, which has been crucial for his political survival. He has defended Hezbollah's right to bear arms, framing its military capabilities as essential for Lebanon. In February, he told the Egyptian TV CBC that the "arms of the resistance" are needed to fight "against the Israeli occupation." Hezbollah has also used its alliance with Aoun to claim Christian credibility and expand its alliances paving a way for Hezbollah's influence in the presidential seat.

However, after Aoun's presidency, tensions grew between his party and Hezbollah especially over Hezbollah’s backing of Sleiman Frangieh rather than FPM leader Gebran Bassil for president.

=== United States ===
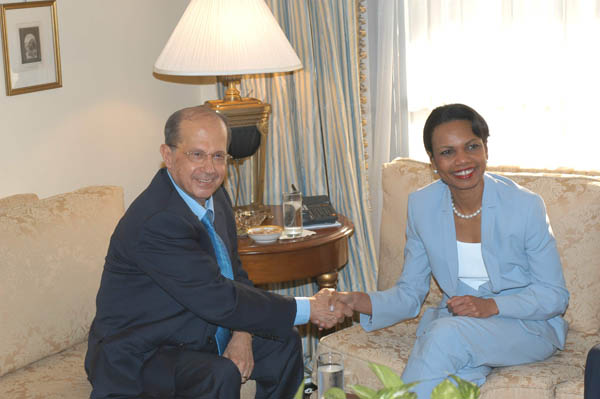
Michel Aoun with US Secretary of State Condoleezza Rice, 2005

In a December 1995 interview with the Middle East Quarterly journal, Aoun replied when asked if he disliked the United States:

Here I must defend myself. My grandfather and cousins fought in the American army. My mother was born in the United States (in Jaffrey, New Hampshire), my sister and her family live in the United States, including my nephews. I studied in the United States. I have never been against the United States and have always respected Americans, a democratic people who forward their values and peace, as we do. I cannot be against the United States; besides, politically, I am linked to American politics. How could anyone say I am anti-American? But I regret the American position on Lebanon. I pray for the day when the United States will correctly see Lebanon.

I know the power of the United States, its influence in the world. I know that it can crush anyone who resists its wishes. At the same time, I will defend myself against the United States even if it crushes me, I will only engage in self-defense.

[...]

It's not just a matter of convincing the American people, but of convincing those who make policy in the United States. They should know that Lebanon is an antidote to much that is wrong with the Middle East. Fundamentalist Islam is creating a fundamentalist Judaism, for action always leads to reaction. If Lebanon fails, how can tolerant societies be built in the Middle East? No land of tolerance will emerge without Lebanon. Remove Lebanon and that hope is gone.

=== Syria ===
During the Lebanese Civil War, Aoun, as head of a disputed Christian government, waged a "war of liberation" against Syrian forces deployed in Lebanon. After returning to Lebanon in 2005, Aoun began advocating for better relations with Syria, saying "This is an old story that is now over. We must have better relations with Syria." Aoun visited Syria in 2008, predicting a "bright future" for ties between Lebanon and Syria after talks with President Bashar al-Assad. As president, Aoun adopted a friendlier position towards Syria and dispatched ministers to Damascus to secure the return of Syrian refugees.

In 2015, he stated that there are no Lebanese detainees remaining in Syria. This was proved false after the fall of the Assad regime where thousands of prisoners were freed, including multiple Lebanese who have been held there since the Lebanese Civil War and endured torture. Aoun became heavily criticized for his neglection and his political opponents called for him to be held accountable.

== Personal life ==
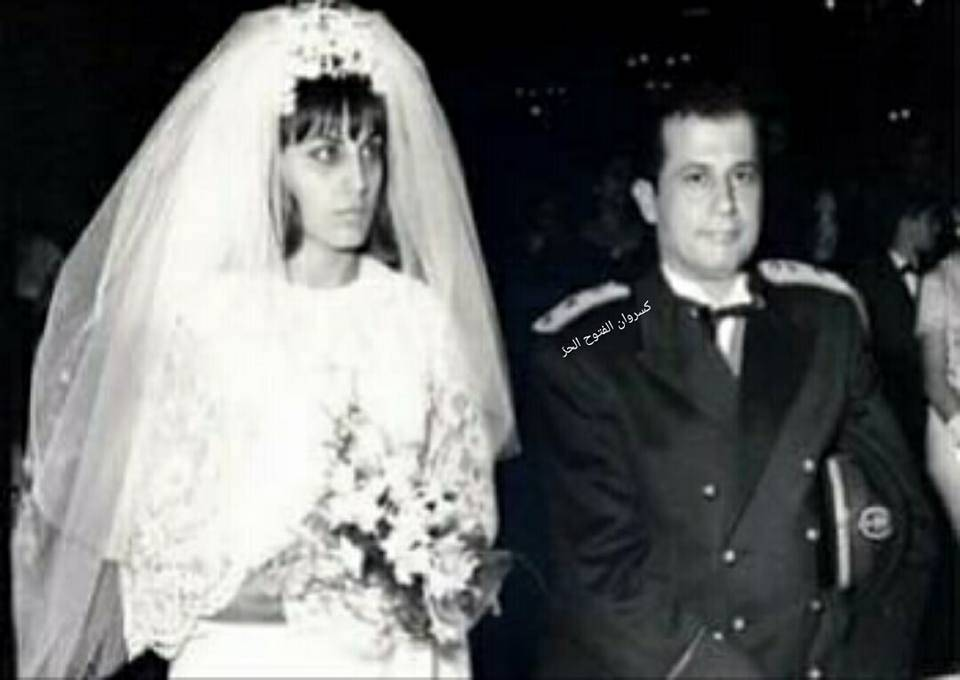
Aoun and Nadia El-Chami at their wedding

A son of Naim and Marie Aoun, he married Nadia El-Chami on 30 November 1968; they have three daughters. The first, Mireille Aoun, who works as his personal advisor and is married to Roy Hachem, the CEO of Aoun's OTV. The second one is Claudine Aoun who serves as the president of the Arab Women Organization since 2019 and the National Commission For Lebanese Women since 2017, and married to Brigadier-General Chamel Roukoz, a decorated officer who took part in Aoun's liberation war, Nahr al-Bared conflict and Battle of Sidon. He is also a Member of Parliament, elected in 2018. The third, Chantal, is married to Gebran Bassil, whom she met at an FPM conference in Paris in 1996. He served as a minister in different cabinets, and succeeded Aoun as president of the Free Patriotic Movement in 2015.

His nephew, Alain Aoun, is a Member of Parliament, elected in 2009, 2018 and 2022.

He is unrelated to Joseph Aoun, who was Commander of the Lebanese Armed Forces during his presidency and succeeded him in 2025 as President of Lebanon.

== Honors ==
=== National decorations ===
Ribbon	Description	Notes	Ref.
	Medal of 31 December 1961	Received it on 30 December 1963	
	War medal	Received it 4 times	
	Knight of the National Order of the Cedar		
	Officer of the National Order of the Cedar		
	Grand Cordon of the National Order of the Cedar		
	Lebanese order of merit - Second class		
	Lebanese order of merit - First class		
	Medal of Battle Wounds		

=== Foreign decorations ===
Ribbon	Description	Notes	Ref.
	Commander of the French Legion of Honor		
	Grand Cross of the French Legion of Honour	Awarded by Emmanuel Macron on 27 September 2017	

== See also ==
- Free Patriotic Movement
- List of presidents of Lebanon
- List of prime ministers of Lebanon
- Members of the 2005–2009 Lebanese Parliament
- Members of the 2009–2013 Lebanese Parliament
- History of Lebanon#Republic of Lebanon
  - Lebanese Civil War (1975–1990)
- List of international presidential trips made by Michel Aoun

== Bibliography ==
- Jean-Marc Aractingi (2006). "Lebanon". La Politique à mes trousses (Politics at my heels). Paris: Editions l'Harmattan. ISBN 978-2-296-00469-6.
- Mahé, H., Liban 1989–1991, Michel Aoun : "Je reviendrai": L'impossible liberté, L'Harmattan, 2015.
- Eibner, J., The Future of Religious Minorities in the Middle East, Lexington Books, 2018.

Military offices
Preceded by Ibrahim Tannous	Commander of the Armed Forces; 1984–1990	Succeeded by Émile Lahoud
Political offices
Preceded by Amine Gemayel	President of Lebanon; Disputed, Acting; 1988–1990	Succeeded by René Moawad
Preceded by Selim Hoss	Prime Minister of Lebanon; Disputed; 1988–1990	Succeeded by Selim Hoss
Preceded by Tammam Salam; Acting	President of Lebanon; 2016–2022	Succeeded by Najib Mikati; Acting
Party political offices
New office	Leader of Free Patriotic Movement; 2003–2015	Succeeded by Gebran Bassil
