= Lebanese Army Military Academy =

- Lebanese Army Military Academy Flag
- Active: October 14, 1946 – Present
- Country: Lebanon
- Type: Military Academy
- Part of: Lebanese Armed Forces
- Garrison/HQ: Faiyadiyeh, Baabda District
- Motto: "Knowledge – Sacrifice"

The Lebanese Army Military Academy (Arabic: الكلية الحربية Al Kulliya al Harbiya) is a part of the Lebanese Armed Forces. The academy is situated at Shikri Ghanem military base, Faiyadiyeh, Baabda District, and is attached administratively to the command and administration department. It is one of the oldest military institutions in Lebanon, and was founded in Damascus in 1921 under the French mandate.

== History ==
Following World War I, the French Army organized different army units in the mandated countries. As a result, the necessity for national officers, translators and specialists was needed in order to establish departments for these units and then to become preparation for their independence. A Military School was established in Damascus in 1921 to prepare and train officers needed for these new units. In 1932, the Military School was relocated to Homs. The managerial Staff of the School during that period consisted of a school commander (a French Officer), a commander assistant (a Lebanese or Syrian officer) and training officers with Non-Commissioned Officers (Lebanese, Syrian or French) as assistants. The enrollment and graduation took place during the month of October of every year. The provisos of admission to the military academy required an individual to be 18 to 25 years of age, hold a brevet certificate, pass the admissions test and to be a Lebanese or Syrian national or have a Lebanese or Syrian father.

The military school trained cadets for various periods, 3 years for those who were not proficient in French, 2 years for those who were proficient in French and one year for Non-Commissioned Officers. At the end of the training period, they graduate and get promoted to lieutenant rank according to a degree. During the graduation ceremony which is often chaired by the Syrian prime minister, the graduating officers are given Platoon commander certificate each in his own specialty (Infantry, Cavalry, Artillery, Engineering) and a certificate of competence for the rank of lieutenant. After the graduation, the officers are assigned to different army units where they establish the necessary departments and units in order to train, habilitate and lead. On August 15, 1945, the school barracks were handed over to the Syrian authorities and the Lebanese and French units moved to Lebanon. Instructors and students joined the Kobbeh barracks in Tripoli and they were put administratively under the authority of the third battalion's company located there. After that, students were given a 15 days leave and joined a camp in Kousba. On September 25, the school moved to St. Anthony convent in Baabda, and settled there for about a year. On October 14, 1946, the school moved to Shikri Ghanem base, the buildings consisted of barracks that were used by the British before they left Lebanon and the school remained in this location till now. On December 31, 1951, the Lebanese president Bechara El Khoury inaugurated the school's new buildings.

== Mission ==
The mission of the military academy is to habilitate and train:

- Students officers to become 2Lt as a platoon leader in the various branches (Army, Navy, Airforce, Internal Security, Customs, General Security, State security).
- Specialized officers recruited as experienced officers according to their fields of studies.
- Subordinate officers (Company Commander Course, or divers courses).
- conscription officers (military draft Officers).
- NCOs who are eligible to become officers.

== Enrollment ==
=== Admission requirements ===
The current requirements a candidate must possess are:

1. Lebanese citizen for more than 10 years.
2. Age: between 18 and 24
3. Not governed by felony or the attempt of a felony of any kind, or by disgraceful misdemeanor or the attempt of an indecent misdemeanor, or by imprisonment for a period that exceed six months and these judgments applied on people who benefit from the pardon (general pardon or special pardon).
4. Bachelor, divorced or widower (no children).
5. Good reputation, not addicted to alcohol, gambling or drugs.
6. Lebanese baccalaureate II or its equivalence.
7. Fit for military service and actions.
8. Undergo a test and be chosen according to his level.
9. Ready to sign a contract for a period which is defined by the institute that he is applying for.
10. Ready to commit in writing when accepted and before entering the military school his readiness to break ties and cancellation of his affiliation to any party, association, or union and the non attendance of their meetings.

=== Admission tests ===
The admission test to the military school consists of four phases:

- First phase: IQ test.
- Second phase: physical fitness test.
- Third phase: Medical test.
- Fourth phase: writing and evaluation test.

Candidates can only continue to the following phases only if they have successfully passed the previous phase. The army commandment, with the approval of the military council, sets out annually and tests the special terms and conditions of each phase of the test prior to students undertaking the examinations.

=== Admission test subjects ===
Subjects of the admission test include:

- Arabic language (understanding and interpretation of a general subject besides translation).
- Foreign language (French or English).
- Geography and history.
- Sociology and economy.
- National studies and civil habilitation.
- Math: algebra, geometry, calculus and trigonometry.
- Sciences: physics, chemistry, natural science and computers, in addition to a medical and fitness test.

== Alumni ==
- Joseph Aoun (born1964), Lebanese politician and former army general, the 14th president of Lebanon since 2025.
- Antoine Lahad (1927–2015), Lebanese Army Major General, and subsequently leader of the South Lebanon Army
- Michel Menassa (born 1952), Lebanese politician and military officer, Minister of National Defense of Lebanon since February 2025
- Michel Suleiman (born 1948), Lebanese politician, 12th president of Lebanon from 2008 to 2014, formerly commander of the Lebanese Armed Forces from 1998 to 2008.

== See also ==
- Fouad Shehab Command and Staff College
