= General (Lebanon and Syria) =

Military rank used in Lebanon and Syria

Lebanese General

Syrian Lieutenant General

Syrian Colonel General

General or Imad (Arabic: عماد) is a military rank used in Lebanon and Syria. It is the highest rank in Lebanon, held by the Commander of the Lebanese Armed Forces, while it is immediately behind Colonel general and Field marshal in the Syrian Army.
