= Bahjat Ghanem military base =

Lebanese army base in Tripoli, Lebanon

- Tripoli, North Lebanon

Site information
- Type: Regional headquarters
- Controlled by: Lebanese Armed Forces

Site history
- Built: 1946

Garrison information
- Garrison: Bahjat Ghanem military base

Bahjat Ghanem military base (Arabic: ثكنة بهجت غانم Thouknat Bahjat Ghanem) is the headquarters of the Lebanese Army North regional command located in Tripoli, in the North Governorate. This command was established few months after the Lebanese Army was handed to Lebanon from the French Mandate, and thus it is considered one of the oldest units in the army.

== History ==
The North regional command was founded in 1946, and used to have three military bases, Youssef Rahmeh military base (located in the Cedar region), George al-Nghayweh military base (located in Andqit) and the Second Sharp Shooters Regiment. In the early 1960s up until the early 1970s, three ground forces were added to the base, which were the Seventh Sharp Shooters Regiment, the Fourth Artillery Regiment and the Third Armored Regiment. Later, a brigade previously used for operations was established, named the Second Brigade and was given its command to the regional commander. In 1983, the Second Brigade was detached from the base and became directly connected to the Lebanese army, thus the authority of the regional commander became limited to logistics, operational, and emergency missions.

Currently, and in addition to the Cedar and Andqit military bases, the military regional command controls two other bases, Nohra al-Shalouhi military base in Batroun and Najib Salameh military base in Kleyate.

== Mission ==
The mission of the military base includes:

- Securing and defending the regional command's military barracks and facilities.
- Taking over, by order from the Lebanese Army command, the place of the brigades that spread inside its territorial periphery, in order for the brigades to focus on its operational objectives.
- Helping civilians in case of disasters and taking part in the differing development programs.

In addition, the military base have also operational and training missions. Operational missions include peacekeeping and reinforcing the abilities of the brigades and regiments in the region, implementing a semi and full alert day and detecting all sorts of explosives, in addition to supervising development programs, supplying emergency units during national religious holidays and offering a communication system for the deployed brigades and regiments in the region. Training missions include supervising shooting ranges located in the region (taking into consideration the security precautions), giving annual physical exams to the officers, army and those who are nominated for promotion due to long periods of military service, giving preliminary exams to the educational offices and supervising the military sports stadiums located in the region.

== Conscription ==
The department for conscription was founded on December 9, 1993. Its three main objectives are:

1. Administrative, which includes receiving new conscripts and preparing their registration procedures.
2. Operational, in which defensive positioning is implemented in the region where conscription takes place.
3. Developmental, which includes tasks such as reporting casualties, rescue and preserving archaeological remains and forests.

== Emblem ==
The emblem of the North regional command is constituted of Cedar trees with snow-capped mountains, the fortress of Tripoli, and a sword in the middle, while surrounded by two laurel leaves and the Arabic inscription of the military base's name.

== See also ==
- Mohammad Zgheib military base
- Lebanese Army Skiing and Mountain Fighting School
- Rene Mouawad Air Base
