= Lebanese Commando Regiment =

Commando Regiment
- Lebanese Army Commando Flag
- Active: 1966; 60 years ago
- Country: Lebanon
- Type: Special operations forces
- Size: Regiment
- Part of: Lebanese Armed Forces, Lebanese Special Operations Command
- Garrison/HQ: Ghassan Ramman military base, Roumieh
- Nickname: The Men's Department Guardians of the Cedar
- Engagements: The War over Water; Six-Day War; Lebanese Civil War; Battle of the Hotels; Hundred Days' War; Multinational Force in Lebanon 1982–1984; Mountain War; War of the Camps; Operation Dinnieh; United Nations Interim Force in Lebanon (1978–present); January 2015 Shebaa farms incident; Operation Benin; 2006 Lebanon War; Operation Nahr el Bared; 2008 conflict in Lebanon; 2010 Israel–Lebanon border clash; 2013 Sidon clash; Hanikra border clash; Battle of Arsal; North Lebanon Clashes (2014); Islamic State Attacks On Lebanese Army on Ras Baalbak
- Decorations: Military awards and decorations

Commanders
- Current commander: General Jean El Atrach
- Notable commanders: General Youssef Tahan Major General François al-Hajj; General Chamel Roukoz; General Mahmoud Tay Abou-dargham; General Maroun Al qobayati Colonel Saleh Kays

Insignia
- Shoulder badge

- Commando Course Badge

The Commando Regiment (Arabic: فوج المغاوير, romanized: Fawj al-Maghaweer) is a special forces unit in the Lebanese Armed Forces (LAF).

== History ==
In 1960, General Emile Boustany, then the commander in northern Lebanon, and Mahmud Tay Abou Dargham discussed the creation of a commando unit. After Boustany became LAF commander, he ordered Captain Abou Dargham to train and form such a unit. The new unit was issued with reserve Beretta rifles. The first two-month course accepted 250 candidates, including Colonels Nabih Farhat and Makhoul Hakim who had attended Egypt's Commando School, of which 65 passed. A second course raised strength to 150. The Commando Company deployed to southern Lebanon during the Six-Day War. The unit was reduced in 1975 by the Lebanese Civil War, with members forming the core of new units, including the Al-Moukafaha. The commando unit received more attention when Abou Dargham became LAF chief-of-staff. According to Abou Dargham, the way that the commandos were trained, employed, and regarded changed in 1975.

== Selection and training ==
A soldier candidate is selected based on a sports test, a general information test, and a medical test. After successfully passing these three tests, the candidates undergo an intensive course in the regiment for one month. This course includes various sports: aerial journeys, basic CQB/CQC, basic commando style raids, climbing, physical exercise, reconnaissance, rope-handling, spear-fighting, and walking with full gear. This course intends to prepare the candidates to follow a commando course for two months at the Lebanese Army Special Forces School, after which graduates follow the companies of the Regiment, and follow additional specialization training in CBRN defense, CQB/CQC, defusing and disposal of bombs and land mines, effective use of tactical arms, explosives, military communications, reading maps, SERE, special warfare, and tactical first aid procedures. After that stage, soldiers are prepared to get used to combat within a squad, then a platoon, then a company.

=== Annual course for new soldiers ===
The annual training program for the newly joined soldiers in the regiment is composed of three stages:

==== Preparatory stage ====
This stage lasts one month, it prepares non-commissioned officers trainers after following studies in training techniques. In addition to preparing the training program, selecting the special studies to be included, and selecting the training sites. Selecting the sites takes into consideration having a variety of locations with different terrains, nature, and weather conditions.

Moreover, this stage involves preparing the orientation plans, according to the plans published by the orientation directorate, in addition to sports competitions based on which companies are evaluated.

==== Technical training ====
This stage lasts three months, it prepares the soldiers technically, for this reason they follow various courses such as driving various vehicles including jeeps, trucks, trailers, APCs, and snowmobiles. This stage also includes training on arms-handling, in addition to educational sessions on using computers, secretariat, and signals.

==== Tactical training ====
This stage lasts for eight months, it includes all levels of combat courses, starting with special training for individual fighting, followed by training on operations within a squad, up to the level of a platoon, and ultimately to a company level and a tactical branch level. The goal behind this is to create harmony and good coordination among the group regardless of its size.

A raiding course is taken annually by all the soldiers at the Special Forces School. In addition, soldiers stay off-base for four days, during which they perform special combat operations that include advance commando style raids, ambushes (during day & night, against vehicles and soldiers), chasing, reconnaissance, storming, tracing, and destroying artillery emplacements.

A course on dealing with helicopters is also taken by all soldiers. During this course they get to know the capabilities of the helicopters, and learn how to equip it and prepare it to perform a tactical mission. Soldiers also train on jumping out of helicopters from low altitudes onto land and into sea, and also train on landing from helicopters using ropes. This course is finalized by conducting a tactical maneuver during which soldiers perform an airborne operation using helicopters on a specific area to perform a mission, given that the helicopter will return later to pick them up at a specific time from another predetermined check point. A unit that fails to reach the check point in time to catch up to the helicopter is left where it is and has to return to the main meeting point of all units on foot.

==== Selecting NCO trainers ====
A non-commissioned officer who is planning to become a commando trainer must be a graduate of the Teaching Institute, and must have followed a commando course, explosives course, and a storming course. In addition, candidates are selected according to qualifications related to leadership and the individual's ability to command. These trainers, follow additional special courses to further develop their experience, enhance their self-confidence, and rehabilitate their intellectual and physical capabilities.

=== Annual training camp ===
The regiment conducts a large scale training camp on a yearly basis, this training lasts three months, and includes similar training to the tactical stage of the new soldiers.

During this camp, soldiers follow special commando combat training, in addition to Survival, Evasion, Resistance and Escape (SERE) training, where soldiers are left alone is a deserted area without food, water, or any mean to aid them. Soldiers have to cope with nature, sustain themselves in face of harsh conditions, and perform the requested mission. Soldiers at this stage are also deprived from having enough sleep, as they are only allowed to sleep for two to three hours a day. Every stage of the training is finalized by a tactical maneuver with live ammunition.

=== Specialized scheduled courses ===
In addition to the annual training program, the regiment always hosts specialized courses followed by specialized soldiers from the various companies accordingly. Among these specialized courses are:

- Combat diver course
- Counter terrorism course
- Climbing course, for mountain combat soldiers
- Cyber warfare course
- Explosives course, for soldiers specialized in engineering
- Intelligence gathering course
- Medical course, as every squad includes a medic
- Military freefall course
- Military maintenance, logistics, and supply chain management course
- Psychological warfare course
- Signals course
- Sniper course

=== On-going training ===
Each commando performs four firing sessions per year performed over the different seasons. Although, sniper specialists perform firing sessions once per month each year; a total of 12 times per year.

An in-base race of 5 km is performed by soldiers each month with full gear on. In addition, a general sports assessment on the regiment level is performed twice a year, and four times on company level.

== Mountain Combat Company ==
Established on February 11, 1998 Founder General Joe Haddad, with the assistance of the French army, as a branch specialized in mountain warfare and directly related to the Lebanese Army command. However, it was included in the commando regiment as a member company as of 1999. The company is headquartered at Soukour al-Kimam military base (Mountain Hawks military base). The head count of trained mountains soldiers reached the level of 2 combat companies in preparation to a full-fledged Mountains Combat Regiment.

=== Present organization ===
The Company includes:

- Three Mountain Combat Platoons
- One support platoon
- One Supply and equipment platoon
- Company Command

=== Training and courses ===
The principles and basics of combat are applied the same; however in a mean that suits the type of land and weather condition where this company is active. The members of the company follow several gradual courses for that purpose, as follows:

- Fundamental course in military skiing, lasts for eight weeks, it includes a theoretical and application study for the skiing and military skiing techniques, moving and taking cover methods in the snow, medical evacuation, firing in snowy and high altitude conditions, tactical training on ambushes, constructing, raiding, reconnaissance, reinforcing combat stations in snow areas, and tactical first aid.
- Fundamental course in military climbing, lasts for five weeks, it includes studies on climbing techniques, climbing safety measures, rope-handling, preparing mountain passes and then crossing them, techniques on crossing hard terrain mountains, and medical evacuation from rock shelves.
- Commander of a mountainous unit course, spans two phases during winter and summer. Each phase lasts for three weeks.
- Tactical course on mountain combat (in winter & summer), this course is considered a total training that includes the special techniques used in mountainous areas learned at the fundamental course stage, and how to apply them in tactical operations in mountains during winter and summer.

Two French Army teams annually train the members of the company over both stages (winter and summer). In addition, some officers and soldiers, follow related courses in France.

=== Emblem ===
The emblem of the company is made out of an angry wolf face with a trumpet around it, decorated by a cedar. Each symbol has a specific meaning:

- The wolf: Represents the small independent units that roam the mountains in all weather conditions.
- The spear: Symbol of the special units.
- The Trumpet: Symbolizes calling all units in the mountains to gather.

=== Operation Nahr el-Bared ===
During Operation Nahr el-Bared, the head of this company, Colonel Ibrahim Salloum, was injured twice; however, he insisted to remain in the battle and ended up dying from a fatal gunshot.

== Weapons, equipment and vehicles ==
The units weapons consist of mainly U.S. weapons, various weapons are used such as the Glock pistol, M4 Carbine assault rifle with M203 grenade launcher, M16 and assault rifles, M249 SAW, MK-46, FN MAG, FN Minimi, M60E4, Barrett M107, M24 sniper rifle, Steyr SSG 69, M110, SVD rifle, M72 LAW, At-4, Mk 19 grenade launcher, M141 Bunker Defeat Munition, Mk 153 SMAW, various mortars.

The list of vehicles include M113, M113 opfor, AIFV, VAB, Panhard AML 90, AIFV-B-C25, HMMWV, M1151, Land Rover, Polaris MRZR D2/D4, Polaris Ranger 4×4, FMTV. The main camouflage of the vehicles is a 3 tone (green, beige, and black) digital pattern. They also use a Tigerstripe camouflage similar to that of the uniform, woodland and white camouflage.The commando regiment is using the Hand-launched UAV RQ-11 Raven.

== Operational deployments ==
This regiment was always among the first to be called upon to hot spots in the country. It has a long history of operations, especially during the Liberation War against Syria.

Commando Regiment Operations History
Name	Date	Location	KIA	Details/Comment
Battle of Souk El Gharb	August 13, 1989	Souk El Gharb, Mount Lebanon	Yes	The Lebanese Army, under the command of General Michel Aoun, battled units of the Syrian Army, Syrian Special Forces, Palestinian factions, and collaborating Lebanese militias (PSP and CP) after these units and militias launched an attack on the town of Souk El Gharb. This battle was considered one of the greatest battles in the history of the Lebanese Army. The 3rd company of the commando regiment was responsible to reclaim the positions that were lost in the initial attack on the east side of the town. In addition to the Lebanese Commando Regiment, the eighth and tenth brigades were involved in this battle.
Operation Dinnieh	December 30, 1999 – January 6, 2000	Dinnieh, North Lebanon	Yes	The operation was triggered by the ambush of a Commando Regiment patrol resulting in the death of several soldiers. The regiment retaliated with a large scale operation in conjunction with the Marine Commandos and the Airborne Regiment.
Operation Nahr el Bared	May 20, 2007 – September 2, 2007	Nahr el Bared refugee camp, North Lebanon	Yes	The regiment was the first to be called upon for deployment, and spearheaded the fighting on the majority of the fronts.
Battle of Sidon (2013)	June 23, 2013 – June 25, 2013	Sidon	Yes	The regiment was the first to be called upon for deployment

This table does not include all the missions

In addition to those operations, the Commando Regiment was used to restore and maintain order in some Lebanese cities at different occasions whenever major clashes or civil strife took place.

== See also ==
- Rangers Sports Events (Lebanon)
- Tomb of the Unknown Soldier in Lebanon
- Lebanese Special Operations Command
- Marine Commandos
