= Marine Commandos =

Marine special operations group of the Lebanese Army

Lebanese Marine Commandos
- مغاوير البحر; Maghāwīr al Baħr
- Lebanese Marine Commando Flag
- Active: 1997–present
- Country: Lebanon
- Branch: Lebanese Army
- Type: Special forces
- Part of: Lebanese Special Operations Command
- Garrison/HQ: Amsheet, Lebanon
- Motto: "Who Dares Joins"
- Engagements: Operation Dinnieh; Global War on Terrorism (2001- Present); United Nations Interim Force in Lebanon (1978–present); January 2015 Shebaa farms incident; Operation Benin; 2006 Lebanon War; Operation Nahr el Bared; 2008 conflict in Lebanon; 2010 Israel–Lebanon border clash; 2013 Sidon clash; Hanikra border clash; North Lebanon clashes (2014)
- Decorations: Military awards and decorations

Commanders
- Current commander: Colonel Mouhamad Moustafa Colonel Johnny Akl
- Notable commanders: General Abdul Karim Hachem General Georges Chraim

Insignia
- Shoulder badge

- Commando Course Badge

The Marine Commandos (Arabic: مغاوير البحر, romanized: Maghāwīr al Baħr) are a special forces unit of the Lebanese Armed Forces (LAF). They are part of the Lebanese Special Operations Command (LSOCOM). Established with assistance from the United States Navy SEALs (U.S. Navy SEALs) and the British Royal Marines Commandos, they are tasked with conducting a variety of missions, particularly in a maritime environment, which include: amphibious reconnaissance, anti-piracy, black operation, irregular warfare, ISTAR, maritime counter-sabotage, maritime counterterrorism and hostage rescue, naval boarding, naval special warfare, special operations behind enemy lines, and support maritime security. The Marine Commandos were established in 1997, then got their administrative independence in July 2001.

== History ==
Until 1997, the only special forces in Lebanon was the Commando Regiment. However, in 1997, as part of the reconstruction and the modernization of the Lebanese Armed Forces, the army command decided to establish a designated regiment for maritime special warfare operations.

Contacts to establish and train this new, multi-purpose special combat unit started by approaching the United States Department of Defense (DOD) and by contacting the British Ministry of Defence (MOD). Eventually a number of officer candidates were sent to train with the Royal Marines Commandos in the UK. Lower ranks were put through their paces in Lebanon by British Royal Marines Commandos. U.S. Navy SEALs also contributed to the training in both the U.S. and Lebanon.

== Main tasks ==
The tasks of the Lebanese Marine Commandos in general are to amphibious reconnaissance, anti-piracy, clandestine operation, counter enemy watercraft, deploy and dispose of naval mines, direct action, executive protection, irregular warfare, ISTAR, long-range penetration, maritime sabotage, naval special warfare, special operations behind enemy lines, underwater demolition, and VBSS operations, conducting joint operations with the Lebanese navy, land, and air forces, and maritime counterterrorism and hostage rescue. In addition, the regiment is tasked with sustaining internal security and performing maritime search and rescue missions.

== Uniform and insignia ==
The regiment's uniform consists of black or U.S.-style Woodland Camouflage fatigues, desert combat boots and a bordeaux beret with the regiment's insignia. In 2008, the unit also adopted the U.S. Digital Desert Camouflage to become a part of their uniforms.

The regiment's trident insignia, which is nearly identical to the U.S. Navy SEAL trident with the addition of a Cedar tree, is usually worn high on the left shoulder. The black uniform has an additional insignia on the right shoulder consisting of a red sword and the word "commando" in red above the sword - this is nearly identical to the former insignia worn on the shoulders of the British Army Commandos and Royal Marines Commandos.

== Weapons, equipment and vehicles ==
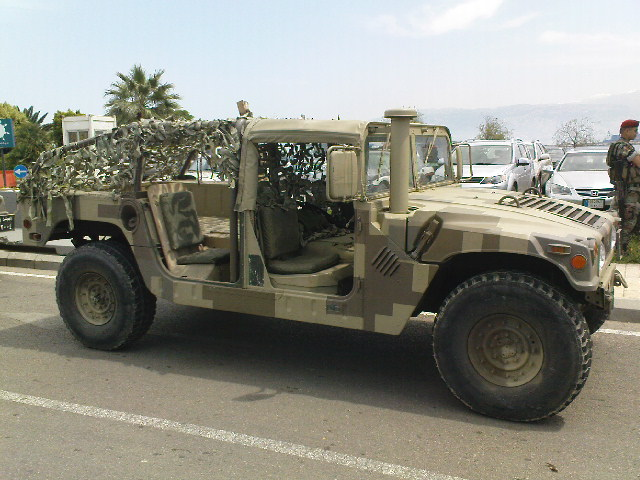
Lebanese Marine Commandos HMMWV with digital camouflage

The units weapons mainly consist of U.S. weapons. Various weapons are used such as the Glock pistol. M4 Carbine with M203 grenade launcher, Heckler & Koch MP5N submachine gun, Close Quarters Battle ReceiverMK18 and M16 assault rifles, FN Minimi, M60E4, M240 and M249 light machine guns, MK-46, FN MAG, Barrett M107 .50 Cal. sniper rifle, M110, M24 sniper rifle, Franchi LAW-12 shotgun, M72 LAW, At-4, Mk 19 grenade launcher, and various mortars.

Their vehicles are the only ones among the other Lebanese Army units to be in a desert camouflage, which comes in different patterns, including a digital pattern. Nevertheless, some vehicles are in green camouflage. The list of their vehicles includes M113, M113 kasman, M113 opfor, AIFV, VAB HMMWV, M1151, Land Rover, Polaris MRZR D2/D4, Yamaha motorcycle, and FMTV.

Their small boats for support arethat's 4 Asis Boats , RHIB, Combat Rubber Raiding Craft.

== Headquarter ==
The Marine Commandos are based in an 85,000 square-meter military complex in Amsheet. The complex contains an Heliport and a small Harbor protected by a 120-meter breakwater.

== Selection and training ==
Reference for all this section

=== Special Forces School ===
The first step for any commando in Lebanon is at the Lebanese Army Special Forces School, where those looking to join any of the Special Forces units receive their first training. The school is responsible for preparing those members through special fundamental courses. At the end, the graduates join their units where they will perform (in addition to their usual tasks) what they have learned during the courses.

Twenty hours of training daily Commander of the school, Commando Lieutenant Colonel Marwan Issa, explains that the students undergo during the fundamental course, which spans three months, heavy military training, sometimes reaching 20 hours per day, and it is divided into three stages:

- Preparatory stage, spanning over three weeks, intended to prepare the students physically and mentally to continue the special forces course. At the end of this stage, the students undergo sports tests that include running for two miles, fixed bar, 45 sit-ups, and 45 push-ups. Those who pass these tests are qualified for the next stage.
- Technical stage, intended to teach the students the techniques of self-defense, and prepares them to endure the different physical and psychological stresses. This stage includes lessons for close combat (fighting and bayonets), unarmed combat, explosives, reading maps, climbing and landing, radio, patrolling techniques, urban warfare, crossing water barriers, in addition to dealing with the navy and the helicopters which is done by what is called "Rope of Confidence" that is jumping from a helicopter or a wooden bar fixed at 6 meters high.

In addition, this stage includes various calisthenics, and walking. During it, the member is exposed to severe psychological pressure like difficulties, hardships, sleep-deprevation, and not getting any chance to rest. Only those who pass this stage can move on to the next.

- Tactical stage, which involves the practical phase of the patrolling techniques, where the students apply ambushes and raids against supposed enemy targets during bad weather and living conditions, in addition to lessons on survival and being imprisoned by the enemy.

From the school to the patrolling base
This phase starts by moving from the school to a patrolling base in deserted land. It begins from the sea, where the members are isolated in the landing boat for 24 hours, followed by three hours of rowing from 3:30 AM until 6:30 AM. After this, the members land on the shore and move towards the patrolling base. Reaching the base takes around 12 to 14 hours of walking with full gear (around 25 kg). This walk starts at altitude zero and ends at around 1400 meters above sea level. In the base, the practical application of the various technical lessons, including the combat patrolling (ambushing and raiding), and surveillance patrolling takes place. The first three weeks of this training involve combat within enemy territory that is why it is performed at night, which forces the members to work for 20 hours per day.

Who makes it till the end
At the end of the third week, the members perform the imprisonment and retrieve prisoners' patrol, which is considered one of the toughest because members play the role of the prisoners and they undergo real torture similar to what they might face if they get captured by the enemy. On the fourth week (after the enemy is defeated), work is performed day and night to chase the enemy, where they begin tracing the enemy and perform different hits ranging from ambushes to raids, in addition to the "hammer and anvil patrol" in which they surround and finish-off the enemy. At the end, the members walk back to the school, a walk between 80 and 100 km, again with full gear.

Only fifteen percent of the initial number of students makes it to the graduation where they are given a commando certificate.

Additional courses

- Commando trainer course
- Storming course, storming with both the pistol and the rifle.
- Engineering support course
- Rope-expert course

=== Marine Commandos selection and training ===
Graduates from the Special Forces School, in addition other candidates, can join the Marine Commandos. The selection of those who are not graduates from the Special Forces School follows a strict guideline: a candidate, preferably below 21, must be fit, have physical strength, and have mental clarity in order to pass the early stages which include calisthenics in addition to physiological pressure assessments. Passing those tests allow the candidate to continue and follow the "Marine Commando" training. Once the candidate passes this training, he can join the Marine Commandos.

The selection and training process for the Marine Commandos is extremely demanding and rigorous and lasts around six to seven months. Candidates, other than graduates of the Special Forces School, are eligible to join from all of Lebanon’s armed forces. Barely 15 per cent make the grade.

The course of the Marine Commandos is split into phases similar to that of the U.S. Navy SEALs 'BUD/S':

- Fundamental
- Complementary
- Specialized

Fundamental training

The fundamental training is the basic course that a Marine Commando undergoes directly after graduating from the school of Special Forces and joining the regiment. This training lasts for eight weeks and includes lessons on swimming, abseiling, handling of small boats, orienting, landing on the beach using RHIBs, in addition to lessons and maneuvers with the Navy.

This stage includes "Week of Hell" course, which is a whole week of arduous and strenuous training that includes a lot of physical pain and oppression. The soldiers push themselves to the limits to apply what is requested during a training that lasts more than 20 hours per day during which they only sleep for two hours.

The goal behind this week is to fortify the capabilities and strengths of the soldiers to endure more and to sustain in front of the severe conditions which they might face during their future operations. It emphasizes on the candidates' physical aptitude and abilities.

Complementary training

At the end of the fundamental training, the members are distributed to the different platoons of the regiment in which they follow complementary training according to their specialization. Among the training:

- Basic diving course, followed at the Navy School.
- Landing and dealing with helicopters course, through which the soldiers learn how to deal with the helicopters and board them to reach their mission location, in addition to landing from the helicopters using ropes and firing from inside them.
- Sniping course, spans over six weeks, prepares capable snipers to snipe over various distances.
- Urban Warfare course or Close Quarter Battle, performed in an urban set training area specialized for such training and a constructed beach side tire house. At the beginning blank bullets are used, then they start training with real ammunition. The goal of this course is to train the soldiers for storming buildings and houses in populated areas without putting the civilians at danger.

In addition to those courses, the complementary training includes different technical courses such as explosives expert course, which is followed at the Engineering Regiment, driving and mechanical maintenance course, followed at the Logistics Brigade, that is in addition to map-reading, orienting, and radio courses.

Specialized training

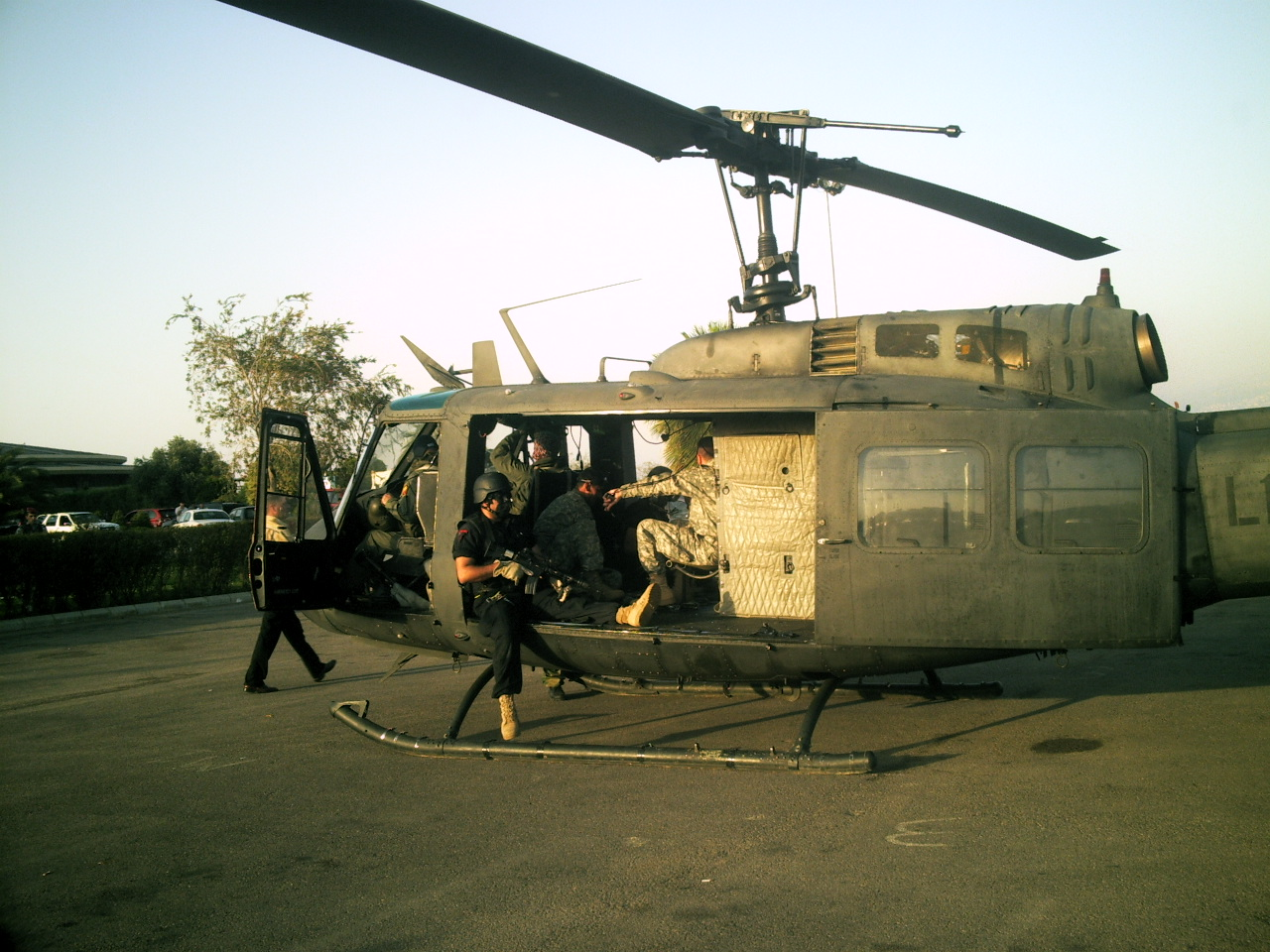
Lebanese Marine Commandos on board of a UH-1H

An advanced stage of the training in each member specializes in a specific military field, such as:

- Diving
- Combat
- Storming
- Airborne operations
- Explosives and ammunition
- Hostage-rescue in the sea

Combat diving

The peak of the training courses at the Marine Commandos is the combat diving course, which is only followed by a small number of highly capable and efficient members. An entrance examination is required. This examination involves 9 km of swimming, 52 meters of underwater crossing, in addition to running, push ups, and sit ups. This course lasts for 18 months, and it is intended to prepare professional fighters capable of using the sea as a way to infiltrate onto the shores and conduct naval special operations and special operations behind enemy lines.

The course includes a number of cruel and cumbersome exercises such as, quick walking, running on the sand, long distance swimming, crossing tens of meters under water, swimming with tied hands and legs, dealing with ropes underwater, etc... All this in order to enhance the combat capabilities and the efficiency of the soldier, in addition to enhance his confidence in his capabilities.

The divers also follow lessons in dealing with explosives either on land or underwater, scanning and searching the shores, weaponology, dealing with boats and helicopters, radio, reading maps, survival, unarmed combat, sailing and rowing, diving accidents, special diving and environmental instructions, defensive diving (open circuit, compresses air) that reaches 60 meters deep, attack diving (closed circuit, 100% oxygen) which reaches 200 meters underwater during day and night, and helocasting boat recovery whereby the swimmer is pulled from the water by a moving boat.

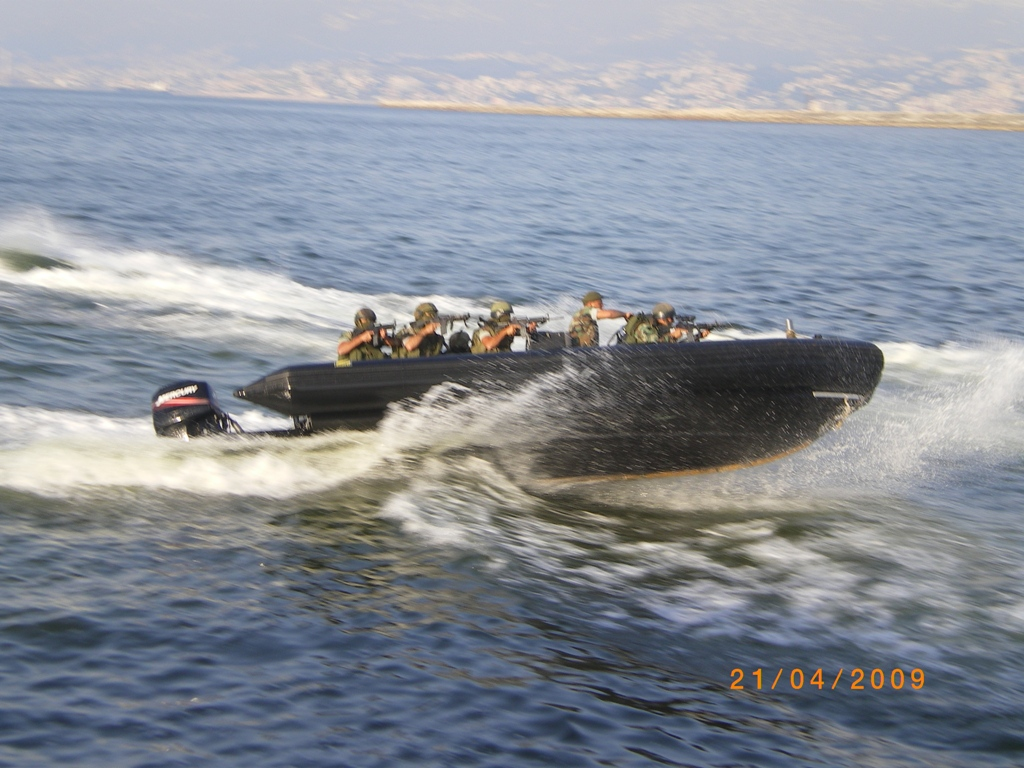
Lebanese Marine Commandos on board of Zodiac RHIB

Scenarios for this training includes combat patrolling that begin in the sea then attack a beach either to occupy it or clean it from obstacles and mines, which is a preparation for the following friendly units. Another scenario includes moving from the beach to raid an enemy base or radar, or to conduct an ambush against a moving enemy.

Graduates of this course are 25% of the original number, and they are considered the elite of the Navy SEALs.

With a week-long break between each segment, selection and training is extremely demanding both physically and mentally which is why there is such as high attrition rate.

Major Melad-Helali stated when asked about the training course: "If a man wants out, we don't stop him. I don't want him here just for the job, as a statistic. While he is in the unit I demand nothing less than his every thinking moment of the day".

Daily training

A 12-hour daily training program is followed by all accepted soldiers of this regiment. It includes running for 7 to 8 km daily, journeys of the warrior, and aerial journeys. In addition to this, training on firing is done at least twice per month.

Facts

It is allowed to lose five men during the course. The command will consider that something acceptable and will not move against the person in charge.

== Operational deployments ==
This regiment was always among the first to be called upon when major trouble took place. In addition, it is notable that this is the only unit in the Lebanese Army to perform an operation outside Lebanon, however, it was only a search and rescue mission.

Marine Commandos Operations History
Name	Date	Place	KIA	Details/Comment
Operation Dinnieh	December 30, 1999 – January 6, 2000	Dinnieh, North Lebanon	Yes	This was the regiment's first official military operation. The regiment contributed in the battles which took place in the mountains of Dinnieh and in clearing the houses.
Operation Benin	December 2004	Cotonou, Benin	No	Search & Rescue in Cotonou where tens of Lebanese civilians died in a plane crash over the sea. The mission's goal was to search for and recover the bodies, in addition to finding the black boxes.
Operation Nahr el Bared	May 20, 2007 – September 2, 2007	Nahr el Bared refugee camp, North Lebanon	Yes	One of the hardest operations according to the commander, the camp is composed of around 6000 buildings that all had to be neutralized from Fatah al-Islam members who were hiding and sniping from them, and who left booby traps behind them.
Operation Al-Ramkin Island	February 8, 2008	Al-Ramkin Island, North Lebanon	No	An unidentified helicopter landed for few short minutes on Al-Ramkin Island, a small Island facing Tripoli, immediately a squad was dispatched to the island to search it and to secure and search the waters around it. The squad found the traces of the helicopter on the sand nothing more. It is notable that none of the Lebanese Army or the UNIFIL radars were able to spot the helicopter, but it was rather discovered by nearby fisherman.

In addition to those operations, the Marine Commandos were used to restore and maintain order in some Lebanese cities at different occasions whenever major clashes or turbulences took place.

== Special Operations Command ==
In 2008, the Lebanese Army started establishing the Special Operations command in order to group the Army's elite units. Among the regiments that were included are the Lebanese Marine Commandos.

== See also ==
- Tomb of the Unknown Soldier (Lebanon) – Military memorial in Beirut
- Lebanese Special Operations Command
- Lebanese Commando Regiment
