= Command and Staff College =

Command and Staff College trains military officers in the administrative, military staff and policy aspects of their profession.

== Australia ==
- Army Command and Staff College, Fort Queenscliff, Victoria
- Australian Command and Staff College, Weston Creek, Canberra

== United States ==
- Air Command and Staff College, Maxwell Air Force Base, Montgomery, Alabama
- College of Naval Command and Staff, Newport, Rhode Island
- Marine Corps Command and Staff College, Quantico, Virginia
- United States Army Command and General Staff College, Fort Leavenworth, Kansas

== Other countries ==
- Defence Services Command and Staff College, Bangladesh
- Canadian Army Command and Staff College, Fort Frontenac, Ontario
- IDF Command and Staff College, Israel
- Fouad Shehab Command and Staff College, Lebanon
- Namibia Command and Staff College, Okahandja, Namibia
- Armed Forces Command and Staff College, Jaji, Nigeria
- Pakistan Command and Staff College, Quetta
- Armed Forces of the Philippines Command and General Staff College
- Singapore Command and Staff College
- Defence Services Command and Staff College, Sri Lanka
- Uganda Senior Command and Staff College, Kimaka, Jinja
- Joint Services Command and Staff College, Oxfordshire, United Kingdom

== See also ==
- Staff College
- War college
