= George al-Nghayweh military base =

George al-Nghayweh military base (Arabic: ثكنة جورج النغيوي Thouknat George al-Nghayweh) is a Lebanese Army base under the jurisdiction of the North regional command (Bahjat Ghanem military base). Founded on October 16, 1992, the military base was named after Commando George al-Nhgayweh and is located in Andqit, North Governorate.

== Mission ==
The mission of the military base includes:

- Providing services to its active and retired personnel and their families. Services include healthcare, educational aid, renewing medical ID's, etc.
- Participating in rescue missions, firefighting and development programs
- Supplying food, medicine and lubricants to the deployed units in the region

== See also ==
- Bahjat Ghanem military base
- North Governorate
