= Youssef Rahmeh military base =

Youssef Rahmeh military base (Arabic: ثكنة يوسف رحمة Thouknat Yousif Rahme) is a Lebanese Army base under the jurisdiction of the North regional command (Bahjat Ghanem military base). Founded on May 1, 1980, the military base is the headquarters of the Skiing and Mountain Fighting School, located in the Cedar region near Bsharri.

It comprises a number of 50 bedrooms for the military personnel and one restaurant, in addition to an officers' club for the Lebanese military officers and their families.

== Mission ==
The mission of the military base includes:

- Defending all the facilities located in the Youssef Rahmeh military base and supplying a reserve for the deployed forces on ground.
- Supplying food, lubricants and performing search and rescue operations.
- Accomplishing all required tasks for preserving the Cedar forest area, with future plans of planting 10,452 (similar to the country's km area) cedar tree in the forest surrounding the base.
- Rescuing, during periods of high alert, people caught in snow storms.

== See also ==
- Lebanese Army Skiing and Mountain Fighting School
- Cedars of God
