= Nohra al-Shalouhi military base =

Lebanese military base

Nohra al-Chalouhi military base (Arabic: ثكنة نهرا الشالوحي Thouknat Nuhra al-Shaluhi) is a Lebanese Army base under the jurisdiction of the North regional command (Bahjat Ghanem military base). Founded on February 1, 1980, the base is located in Batroun, North Governorate.

== Mission ==
The mission of the military base includes:

- Defending all the facilities located in the Nohra al-Shalouhi military base
- Supplying food, lubricants and maintenance for deployed units
- Providing back up and defense for the regiments in the region
- Providing development programs in the region

== See also ==
- Lebanese Navy
