= Staff college =

Administrative training school for military officers

Staff college (also command and staff college and War college) trains military officers in the administrative, military staff and policy aspects of their profession. It is usual for such training to occur at several levels in a career. For example, an officer may be sent to various staff courses: as a captain they may be sent to a single service command and staff school to prepare for company command and equivalent staff posts; as a major to a single or joint service college to prepare for battalion command and equivalent staff posts; and as a colonel or brigadier to a higher staff college to prepare for brigade and division command and equivalent postings.

The success of staff colleges spawned, in the mid-twentieth century, a civilian imitation in what are called administrative staff colleges. These institutions apply some of the principles of the education of the military colleges to the executive development of managers from both the public and private sectors of the economy. The first and best-known administrative staff college was established in Britain at Greenlands near Henley, Oxfordshire and is now renamed Henley Management College.

== History ==
The first modern staff college was that of Prussia. Prussian advanced officer education began under the reign of Frederick the Great in 1710.

The Seven Years' War demonstrated the inadequacy of the education that generals had at that time, but it was not until 1801 that staff training in a modern sense began when Gerhard von Scharnhorst became the director of the Prussian Military Academy. Prussian defeats by Napoleon I led to the creation of the Allgemeine Kriegsschule (General War Academy) with a nine-month programme covering mathematics, tactics, strategy, staff work, weapons science, military geography, languages, physics, chemistry, and administration. The German staff courses have been used as a basic templates for other staff courses around the world.

== Staff course formats ==
Nations have taken a wide variety of approaches to the form, curriculum and status of staff colleges, but have much in common with the Prussian courses of the early 19th Century. Some courses act as filters for promotion or entry into a specialist staff corps. The length of courses varies widely, from three months to three years, with some having entrance and/or exit examinations. The more senior the course, the more likely that it will include strategic, political and joint aspects, with junior courses often focusing on single service and tactical military aspects of warfare.

== Idiom ==
Certain terms of art or idiom have developed in staff colleges over time, and then been used in wider college or university settings and everyday usage, including:

- staff refers to the professional personnel (usually called directing staff (DS)) and employees of the college;
- fight the white, normally expressed as do not fight the white (as in do not go against the staff's pre-determined answer), where the 'white' is the question given to students, which may lack realism or not fit current operations. A "pink" is the Staff College's staff answer to a particular problem or issue. Pinks and whites referred to the color coding of course material where problems and information for use of students was printed on standard white sheets of papers while material intended for use by directing staff (which often contained suggested solutions/answers) was produced on pink sheets. This practice originates from staff colleges of British origins. The tradition survives across several Commonwealth staff colleges such as the Command and Staff College, Quetta.

== Staff colleges ==
The following is an incomplete list of staff colleges, by continent by country:

=== Africa ===
==== Ghana ====
- Ghana Armed Forces Command And Staff College Military Academy And Training Schools, Teshie, Accra

==== Kenya ====
- Defense Staff College, Nairobi

==== Namibia ====
- Namibia Command and Staff College, Okahandja

==== Nigeria ====
- Armed Forces Command and Staff College, Jaji in Kaduna State

==== South Africa ====
- South African National Defence College, Thaba Tshwane in Pretoria, Gauteng
- South Africa National War College, Pretoria
- South African Army College, Pretoria
- South African Air Force College, Pretoria
- South African Naval Staff College, Muizenberg, Western Cape
- South African Military Health Training Formation, Pretoria

==== Uganda ====
- Uganda Senior Command and Staff College, Kimaka in Jinja District
- Uganda Junior Staff College, Jinja in Jinja District

=== The Americas ===
==== Argentina ====
- Escuela Superior de Guerra "Teniente General Luis María Campos".

==== Brazil ====
===== Army =====
- Escola de Comando e Estado-Maior do Exército
- Escola de Aperfeiçoamento de Oficiais
- Escola de Aperfeiçoamento de Sargentos das Armas
- Escola de Instrução Especializada

===== Navy =====
- Escola de Guerra Naval

===== Air Force =====
- Escola de Comando e Estado Maior da Aeronáutica
- Escola de Aperfeiçoamento de Oficiais da Aeronáutica

==== Canada ====
- Canadian Army Command and Staff College
- Canadian Forces College

==== United States ====
===== Air Force =====
- Air University, HQ at Maxwell AFB, Alabama
  - USAF Air War College
  - School of Advanced Air and Space Studies
  - Air Command and Staff College
  - Squadron Officer School
  - Air Force Institute of Technology (Wright-Patterson AFB, Ohio)

===== Army =====
- U.S. Army War College, Carlisle Barracks, PA
- Command and General Staff College, Fort Leavenworth, KS
  - School for Command Preparation
  - School of Advanced Military Studies
  - Command and General Staff School
  - School for Advanced Leadership and Tactics
- U.S. Army Warrant Officer Career College, Fort Rucker, AL

===== Navy =====
- Naval War College in Newport, Rhode Island
  - College of Naval Warfare
  - Maritime Advanced Warfighting School
  - College of Naval Command and Staff
- Naval Postgraduate School in Monterey, California

===== Marines =====
- Marine Corps University, Marine Corps Base, Quantico, VA
  - Marine Corps War College
  - School of Advanced Warfighting
  - Marine Corps Command and Staff College
  - Expeditionary Warfare School

===== Joint =====
- Defense Acquisition University - five campuses - HQ at Fort Belvoir, Virginia
- National Defense University in Washington D.C.
  - National War College
  - Industrial College of the Armed Forces
  - Joint Forces Staff College in Norfolk, Virginia,

==== Uruguay ====
- Military Institute of Advanced Studies

=== Asia ===
==== Bangladesh ====
- Defence Services Command And Staff College
- National Defence College

==== China ====
- People's Liberation Army National Defense University
  - Nanjing PLA Army Command College
  - Shijiazhuang PLA Army Command College
  - PLA Naval Command College
  - PLA Air Force Command College
  - PLA Artillery Command College
  - Second Artillery Corps Command College

==== India ====
===== Tri-Service =====
- National Defence College for One Star officers and Civil servants
- Defence Services Staff College
- College of Defence Management
- Military Institute of Technology (MILIT) is a Technical Staff College

===== Army =====
- Army War College, Mhow

===== Navy =====
- Naval War College, Goa

===== Air force =====
- College of Air Warfare

==== Indonesia ====
- National Armed Forces Command and General Staff College
- Army Command and General Staff College
- Naval Command and General Staff College
- Air Force Command and General Staff College

==== Japan ====
===== Tri-Service =====
- Joint Staff College (統合幕僚学校, Tōgō Bakuryō Gakkō)

===== JGSDF and IJA =====
- JGSDF TERCOM (陸上自衛隊教育訓練研究本部 Rikujō Jieitai Kyōiku Kunren Kenkyū Honbu)
- JGSDF Staff College (陸上自衛隊幹部学校, Rikujō Jieitai Kanbu Gakkō) - Reorganised into TERCOM in 2018
- Army War College (陸軍大学校, Rikugun Daigakkō) - Abolished in 1945
- Army Artillery and Engineer School (陸軍砲工学校, Rikugun Hōkō Gakkō) - Renamed Army Science School (陸軍科學學校, Rikugun Kagaku Gakkō) in 1941, abolished in 1945

===== JMSDF and IJN =====
- JMSDF Staff College (海上自衛隊幹部学校, Kaikujō Jieitai Kanbu Gakkō)
- Naval War College (海軍大學校, Kaigun Daigakkō) - Abolished in 1945

===== JASDF =====
- Air Staff College (航空自衛隊幹部学校, Kōkū Jieitai Kanbu Gakkō)

==== Jordan ====
Royal Jordanian Joint Command and Staff College

==== Kuwait ====
Mubarak al-Abdullah Joint Command and Staff College

==== Lebanon ====
- Fouad Shehab Command and Staff College

==== Nepal ====
- Army Command and Staff College Kathmandu , Nepal
- APF Command and Staff College Kathmandu, Nepal

==== Pakistan ====
- National Defence University
- Command and Staff College
- PAF Air War College
- Pakistan Navy War College

==== Philippines ====
- Armed Forces of the Philippines Command and General Staff College

==== Saudi Arabia ====
- Saudi Armed Forces Command and Staff College

==== Singapore ====
- Goh Keng Swee Command and Staff College

==== Sri Lanka ====
===== Tri-Service =====
- National Defence College, Sri Lanka
- Defence Services Command and Staff College
- General Sir John Kotelawala Defence University

===== Army =====
- Army War College, Buttala
- Volunteer Force Training School
- Army School of Logistics

===== Navy =====
- Naval and Maritime Academy

===== Air Force =====
- SLAF Junior Command & Staff College

==== Taiwan (Republic of China) ====
- National Defense University
  - Army Command and Staff College
  - Naval Command and Staff College
  - Air Command and Staff College

==== United Arab Emirates ====
- Armed Forces of the UAE Command and Staff College

=== Europe ===
==== Finland ====
- National Defence University (Finland)

==== France ====
	Active duty officers	Reserve officers	Civilians
2nd tier	Centre des hautes études militaires	Institut des hautes études de la défense nationale	Institut des hautes études de la défense nationale
1st tier	École de guerre	École supérieure des officiers de réserve spécialistes d'état-major	None

- École de guerre ("War School"). Created in 1993 by the fusion of the four Écoles supérieures de guerre ("War Higher Schools"). Formerly known as
- Centre des hautes études militaires ("School of Advanced Military Studies"). Created in 1952. The students must have completed the École de guerre.
- Institut des hautes études de la défense nationale (IHEDN, "Institute of Advanced Defense Studies"). Created in 1936. The students are civilians, both civil servants and high-profile executives, but the students of the Centre des hautes études militaires also attend the Institut..
- École supérieure des officiers de réserve spécialistes d'état-major (ESORSEM, "Reserve Staff Officers School"). Following the defeat of Franco-Prussian War, it was created in 1899 by a group of Reserve Officers and then officially became a staff college in 1900.

All these schools are seated in the école militaire in Paris.

==== Germany ====
- Führungsakademie der Bundeswehr, Bundeswehr Command and Staff College.
- Bundesakademie für Sicherheitspolitik, Federal Academy for Security Policy.

==== Italy ====
- Istituto di Studi Militari Marittimi, The Naval War College located within the Arsenale Marittimo in Venice.
- Istituto di Scienze Militari Aeronautiche, The Aeronautics and Defence Science Institute located in Florence.

==== Portugal ====
- Instituto de Estudos Superiores Militares ("Higher Military Studies Institute"), Portuguese Armed Forces Joint Command and Staff College. Created in 2005 by the fusion of the former three separate Army, Navy and Air Force staff colleges
- Instituto da Defesa Nacional ("National Defense Institute"), Ministry of Defense college for National and International Security policy, created in 1967.

Sweden

- Försvarshögskolan (Stockholm)

==== Switzerland ====
- Armed Forces College AFC (Luzern)

==== United Kingdom ====
- Defence Academy of the United Kingdom (Shrivenham)
  - Joint Services Command and Staff College for officers (OF2 to OF6) and Warrant Officers (Shrivenham)
    - JSCSC was formed by the merger in 1997 of: Staff College, Camberley (Army), Royal Naval College, Greenwich and RAF Staff College, Bracknell and the Joint Service Defence College
  - Royal College of Defence Studies for officers generally of colonel or brigadier rank (OF5/OF6) and civilians (London)

=== Oceania ===
==== Australia ====
The Australian Defence College (ADC) was officially opened in 1999 in Canberra. It is a Joint organisation, and comprises:

- the Centre for Defence and Strategic Studies (CDSS), Weston Creek,
- the Australian Command and Staff College (ACSC), Weston Creek, and
- the Australian Defence Force Academy (ADFA).

Prior to the establishment of the Australian Command and Staff College, middle management officer Command and Staff training was conducted at separate single Service staff colleges:

- the RAN Staff Course at the RAN Staff College at HMAS Penguin in Sydney
- the Army Command and Staff Course was conducted at the Army Command and Staff College at Fort Queenscliff in Victoria; and
- the RAAF Staff Course at the RAAF Staff College at RAAF Base Fairbairn in Canberra.

==== New Zealand ====
- New Zealand Defence College

=== Intercontinental ===
==== NATO ====
- NATO Defence College

== See also ==
- Command and Staff College (disambiguation)
- International Association for Military Pedagogy
- International Society of Military Sciences
- Staff (military)
- War college
- Community College of the Air Force, a unique U.S. institution that exclusively trains enlisted personnel
