= Lebanese Special Operations Command =

- Founded: 2008
- Country: Lebanon
- Type: Unified combatant command
- Size: 5,000 (3 brigades)
- Part of: Lebanese Armed Forces
- Nickname: LSOCOM

The Lebanese Special Operations Command (LSOCOM) (Arabic: قيادة القوات الخاصة اللبنانية Kiyadat al Kouwat al Khasa al Loubnanya) is the unified combatant command charged with overseeing the various special warfare operations component commands of the Lebanese Armed Forces (LAF) which groups Lebanon's special combat units. The command is part of the LAF.

== Background ==
The command was founded as a result of the lessons the Lebanese Army learned in the Nahr el Bared Operation. The Lebanese Special Forces spearheaded the attack on the camp in which 169 soldiers died and were the workhorse in the battle and the key to the success of the campaign. Nahr el Bared was the first occasion where these regiments were able to prove themselves capable, especially at anti-irregular military, counterterrorism, hostage rescue, and irregular warfare operations, which prompted the Lebanese Army Command to start planning to expand them.

== Structure ==
The LSOCOM includes Lebanon's 4 Special Forces Regiments:

- Counter-Sabotage (Moukafaha) Branch and the Strike Force (Kouwa el-Dareba) Anti-Terrorism Branch
- Lebanese Airborne Regiment
- Lebanese Commando Regiment (a.k.a. the Maghaweer)
- Lebanese Marine Commandos Regiment

== Future ==
At formation, the size of the force was around 5,000 soldiers; however, the plan is to build a force the size of two to three brigades.

== See also ==
- Tomb of the Unknown Soldier in Lebanon
