= Portuguese Joint Command and Staff College =

- Instituto de Estudos Superiores Militares
- Motto: Por puro engenho e por ciência ("Taught by Science or pure Wits", from The Lusiads, Canto V, 17, v. 6)
- Type: Staff college
- Established: 2005
- Director: Lieutenant-General Rui Matias
- Location: Lisbon, Lisboa Region, Portugal; 38°41′54″N 9°13′19″W
- Campus: Urban
- Website: IESM official website

The Portuguese Joint Command and Staff College (Portuguese: Instituto de Estudos Superiores Militares) or IESM is the military university establishment that provides training and education to experienced officers of the three service branches of the Portuguese Armed Forces and of the Portuguese National Republican Guard (GNR).

The training and education given by the IESM focuses in the general areas of administration, strategy and operations, as well in the specific areas related with the Navy, the Army, the Air Force and the GNR.

The IESM was created in 2005, from the merger of the former three separate staff colleges of the Portuguese Army (IAEM, Instituto de Altos Estudos Militares), of the Portuguese Navy (ISNG, Instituto Superior Naval de Guerra) and of the Portuguese Air Force (IAEFA, Instituto de Altos Estudos da Força Aérea). It occupies the installations of the former IAEM at Pedrouços, Lisbon. Replaced in 2014 by the Military University Institute ((Portuguese: Instituto Universitário Militar) or IUM

== Academics ==
The Portuguese Joint Command and Staff College offers the following academic programs:

- Promotion to General Officer Program;
- Staff programs:
1. Joint Staff,
2. Army Staff;
- Master in Military Sciences - Security and Defense;
- Promotion to Field Officer programs:
1. Navy,
2. Army Combat Arms and Service Support,
3. Army Health and Technical Services,
4. Air Force,
5. GNR Military Administration,
6. GNR Arms of Service,
7. GNR Personnel and Secretariat;
- Specialization programs:
1. Psychological Operations Planning,
2. Civil-military co-operation,
3. Introduction to Media,
4. African Studies.
