= Sport in Lebanon =

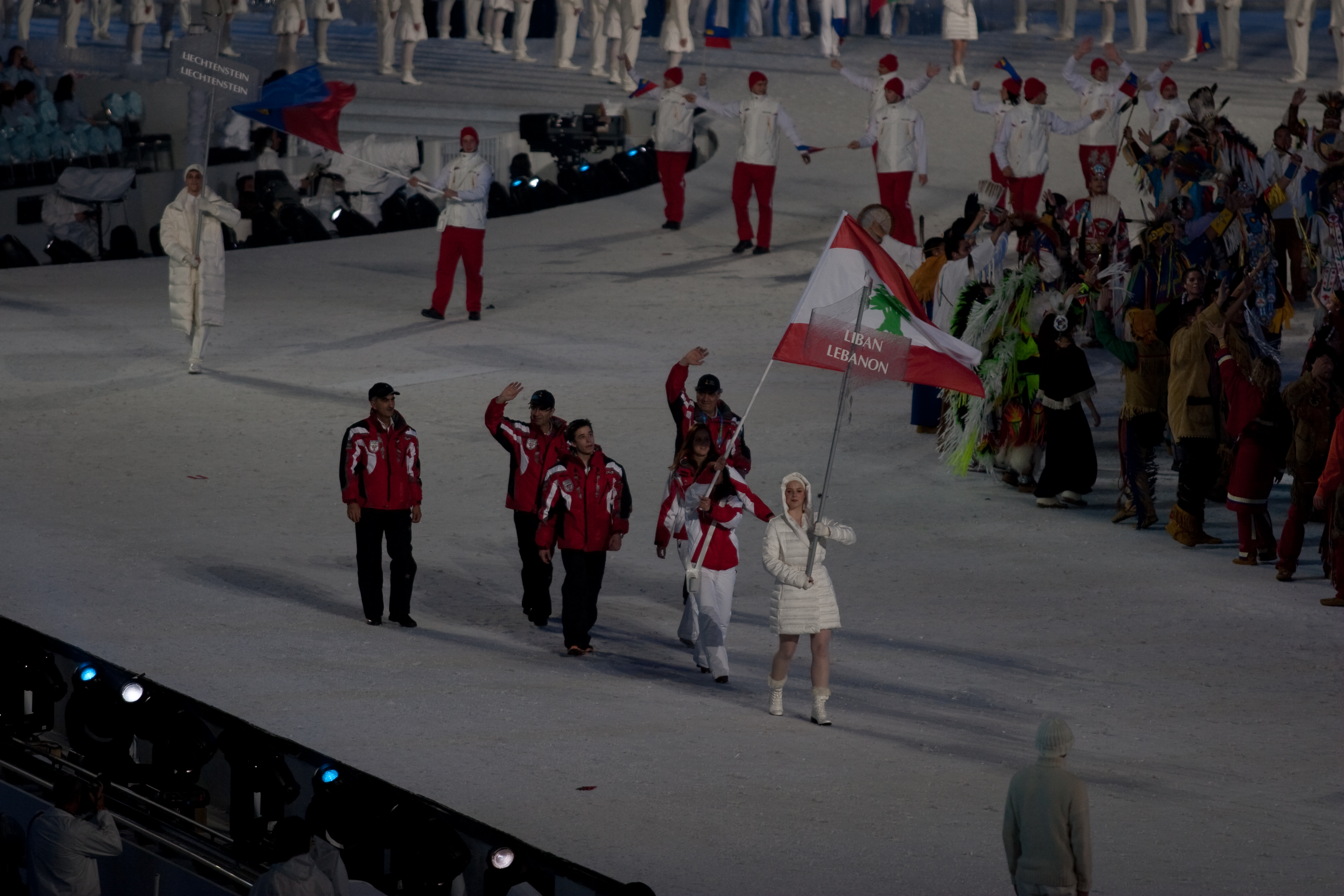
Lebanon at the 2010 Winter Olympics

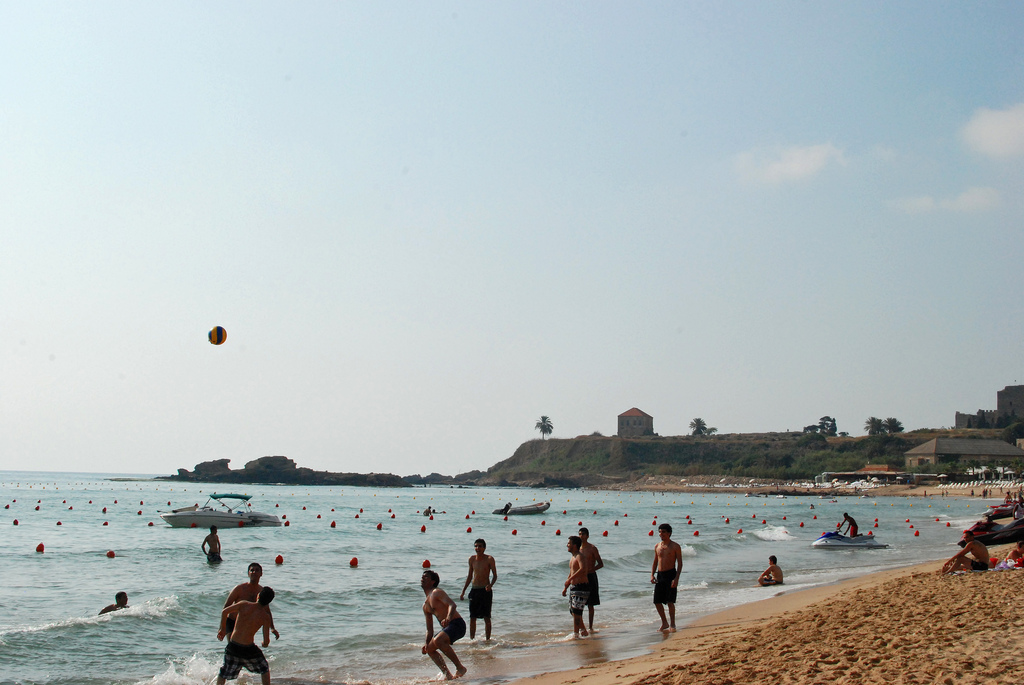
Beach volleyball in Byblos

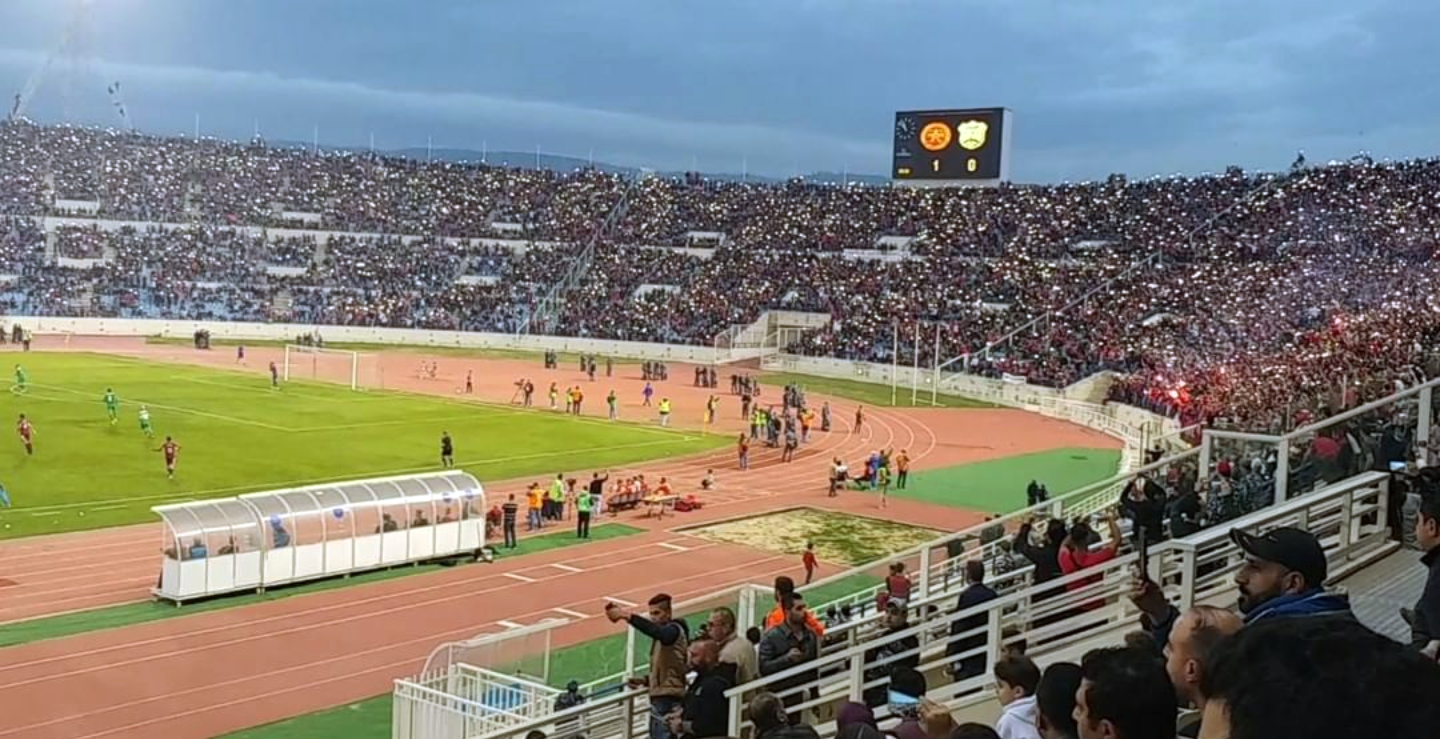
Camille Chamoun Sports City Stadium in Beirut

Because of Lebanon's geography, both summer and winter sports are engaged in in the country. During autumn and spring it is sometimes possible to engage in both activities on the same day; for example, skiing in the morning and swimming in the afternoon.

Lebanon hosted the Asian Cup in 2000 and the Pan-Arab Games in 1957 and again in 1997. Lebanon gained acceptance to host the 13th Pan-Arab Games in 2015. Although the Asian Winter Games were under consideration to be held in Lebanon in 2009, they ultimately did not take place. However, Lebanon did host Les Jeux de la Francophonie in 2009.

== Autosports ==
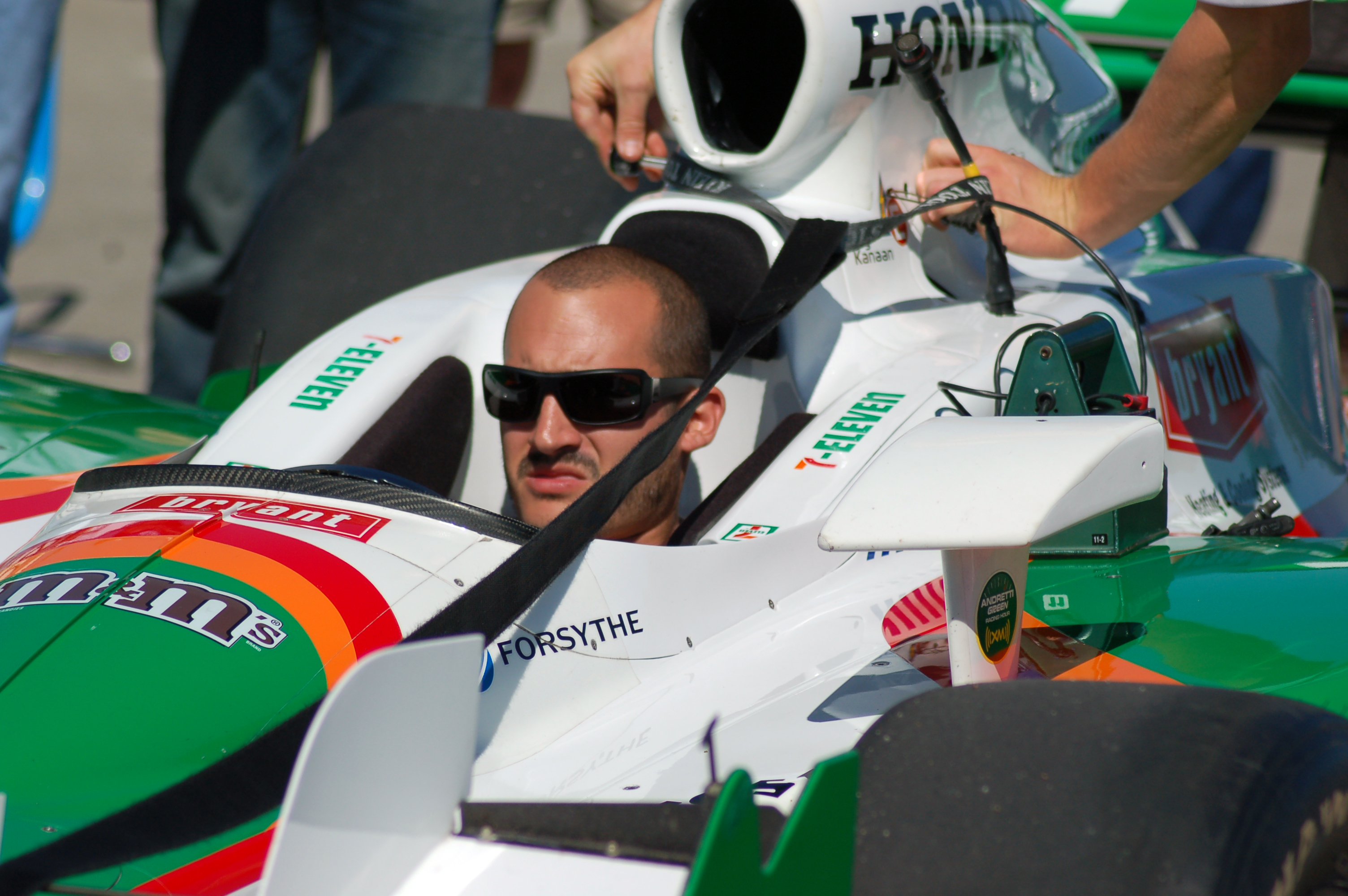
Tony Kanaan, the Lebanese Brazilian race-car driver

=== Rally ===
Rally of Lebanon, which is organized by the Automobile et Touring Club du Liban (ATCL), has been a sport in Lebanon since the late 1960s.

=== Grand Prix ===
In 2001, Solidere planned to build a racing circuit in the Beirut Central District in a bid to stage Formula One races in Lebanon. The plan never saw fruition. However, Lebanon entered the world of international motor sport in 2004 with the formation of the Lebanese A1 Grand Prix team that included driver Basil Shaaban, making Lebanon the first Arab nation to participate in the World Cup of Motorsport.

== Athletics ==
=== Jogging ===
Jogging is popular in parts of the capital.

=== Marathons ===
The Beirut International Marathon (BIM) has been an annual event since 2003.

== Bodybuilding ==
Bodybuilding is a sport in Lebanon. Bodybuilders like Samir Bannout, Fouad Abiad and Mohammad Bannout won international competitions.

== Combat sports ==
=== Greco-Roman wrestling ===
Khalil Taha was a bronze medal winner in the 1952 Helsinki Olympics in Greco-Roman wrestling, while Zakaria Chihab won the silver. In 1980, Hassan Bechara won the bronze medal at the 1980 Summer Olympics in Moscow.

=== Martial arts ===
Martial arts are also combat sports in Lebanon.

== Equine sports ==
The Beirut Hippodrome, a horse-racing facility built in 1885, is once again operating after years of neglect during the war. Additionally, private clubs have been established in Lebanon, such as The Lebanese Equestrian Club (CHL) also known as Club Hippique Libanais, the Buldozer

== Mountain sports ==
Hiking, trekking and mountain biking are sports in the summer when ski lifts can be used to access some of Lebanon's trails, with views stretching as far as Cyprus to the west and Syria to the east. The Lebanon Mountain Trail is Lebanon's first national long-distance hiking trail that covers 440 km and passes through 75 villages, starting in the north and trecking over Mount Lebanon until it terminates in the south of Lebanon. The Baskinta Literary Trail, 24-km long, offers hikers a chance to discover 22 literary landmarks related to Lebanese literary figures. Cross-country running, rock climbing, and caving are also practiced across Mount Lebanon.

== Racquet sports ==
=== Tennis ===
According to the 13th century French tale, L'histoire d'Apollonius de Tyr, the Stoic philosopher and Phoenician king, Apollonius of Tyre was the oldest tennis player and champion on record, albeit fictional. In reality, Lawn tennis did not come to Lebanon until 1889 when it was first introduced in the village of Brummana. Ainab was one of the first villages in Lebanon to have a tennis court, which was built by five professors from the American University of Beirut early in the 20th century. The annual tennis tournament, which was an international event prior to the war, but now mostly a national one, is held at Brummana High School in August.

Table tennis : Www.lttf.com.lb

== Team sports ==
=== Association football ===
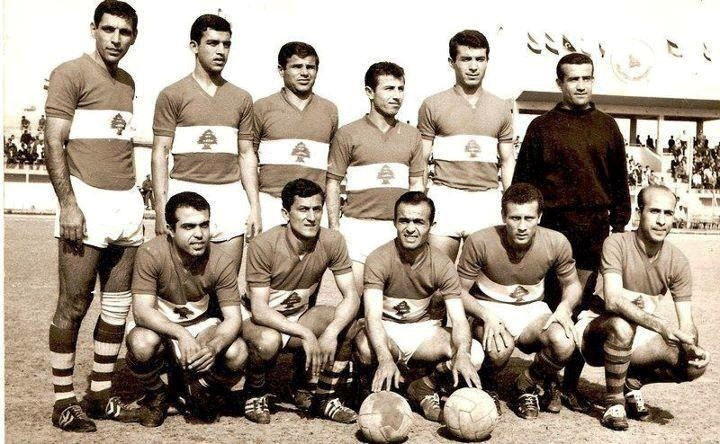
Lineup of the Lebanon national team at the 1966 Arab Nations Cup.

Football is the most popular sport in Lebanon. It is governed by the Lebanese Football Association (LFA). The country's most supported clubs are Nejmeh and Ansar, with Ahed gaining popularity in recent years.

While the national team has never qualified for the FIFA World Cup, they first participated in the 2000 AFC Asian Cup, as hosts. Lebanon's first participation through regular qualification came in the 2019 AFC Asian Cup, in which they narrowly missed out on the knock-out stages by the fair-play rule. They finished third once in the Arab Cup, twice in the Pan Arab Games, and once in the Mediterranean Games, in all four instances as hosts.

The top division of the Lebanese football league system is the Lebanese Premier League, in which 12 teams compete. Cup competitions include the Lebanese FA Cup, the national domestic cup competition, the Lebanese Super Cup, held between the winner of the league and the FA Cup, and the Lebanese Federation Cup, a pre-season tournament in which the Lebanese Premier League teams compete.

In 2005, Nejmeh became the first team from Lebanon to reach the final of the AFC Cup. However, they lost to Al-Faisaly 4–2 on aggregate. After beating April 25 in the final of the 2019 AFC Cup, Ahed became the first Lebanese team to win the competition.

=== Basketball ===
Basketball is one of the most popular sports in Lebanon. In basketball, the main federation is the Lebanese Basketball Federation it's a member of FIBA Asia. The first time basketball was played was in the mid-1920s. The Lebanon national basketball team has qualified three consecutive times to the FIBA World Championship in 2002, 2006, 2010 and ranked 24th in the world and the women national team is ranked 61st in the world. Lebanon owns its own basketball league: Lebanese Basketball League for men and women in addition to the Lebanese Basketball Cup.

Famous basketball players include:

- From Lebanon: Fadi El Khatib and Elie Mechantaf
- From the Lebanese diaspora: Rony Seikaly, Brian Beshara and Matt Freije
- Naturalized Lebanese players from the United States: Joe Vogel and Jackson Vroman

=== Futsal ===
The Lebanese play mini football which is very similar or identical to futsal. The Lebanon national futsal team represents Lebanon in international futsal competitions and is controlled by the Futsal Commission of the Federation Libanaise de Football Association. In December 2007, Lebanon ranked 34 in the Futsal World Ranking, the sixth highest ranking Asian team that year. In 2010, Lebanon ranked 41 and in 2011, the country ranked 48.

=== Rugby league ===
Rugby league is a sport in Lebanon. The Lebanese Rugby League Federation is based in Safra in Lebanon. They are Full Members of the Rugby League European Federation and also Full Members of the Rugby League International Federation. The Lebanon national rugby league team qualified and played in the 2000 Rugby League World Cup, and nearly qualified for the 2008 Rugby League World Cup, but were beaten by Samoa in their final game. In 2011, Lebanon again nearly qualified for the 2013 Rugby League World Cup but lost to Italy who became the 14th and final nation to qualify for the event. In 2015 they finally qualified for the 2017 Rugby League World Cup, for what was just their second World Cup, after beating South Africa 2–0 in a 2-match qualifying play-off held in Pretoria. The Lebanon Rugby League ("LRL") National Championship is the leading domestic rugby league competition in Lebanon, and consists of 4 clubs (Tripoli City RLFC, Immortals RLFC, Jounieh RLFC and Wolves FC). The second tier of competition, known as the Collegiate Rugby League ("CRL") National Championship, consists of teams representing Lebanese universities and institutes of higher learning. The CRL is divided into two Divisions based upon longevity & success of the institution's Rugby League programme, and the CRL: Playoffs converge into a single CRL Finals Series. Rugby League is popular amongst Lebanese schools, with regional Schools Rugby League ("SRL") championships held in "North Lebanon" and also in "Beirut & Mount Lebanon" regions, where the winners (aka: "Premiers") of each region face off to be crowned the "National Champion"; contested at both U14s and U16s level. Lebanon has also sent schools to compete in regional international schools tournaments, and has hosted junior international sides from throughout the Middle East/North Africa region.

=== Rugby union ===
Rugby union in Lebanon dates back to the French colonial period.

=== Touch football ===
Touch Football is a sport in Lebanon. In 1998, Lebanese Australians founded the Lebanon Touch Football Association.

=== Volleyball ===
Volleyball has some popularity in Lebanon where there is a professional volleyball league. This team sport was introduced to Lebanon through foreign schools after the First World War in 1918. In the 1920s, it spreads in some schools, namely the Sacré Coeur, Al Makassed and La Sagesse and in some universities such as the Saint Joseph University (USJ) and the American University of Beirut (AUB). In 1973, the Lebanese government signed a sport's cooperation treaty with the USSR to have Soviet coaches train the Lebanese national volleyball team. Lebanon has competed in international volleyball events. In 1952, Israel defeated Lebanon 3–0 and then lost to Lebanon 3–2 in the World Volleyball Championships in Moscow.

== Water sports ==
Swimming, water skiing, yachting, sailing, scuba diving, and windsurfing are practiced along the Mediterranean coast of Lebanon, especially between Beirut and Tripoli.

=== Diving ===
Diving is a sport in Lebanon with wrecks to explore.

=== Water skiing ===
Lebanese water skier Silvio Chiha snagged the gold medal at the Asia-Australasia Oceania (AAO) water skiing championship that happened in 2012 in Chuncheon, South Korea. [DailyStar]

An international water ski championship was held in the Saint George Bay in Beirut, beginning in 1955, but the event was discontinued at the beginning of the war.

- Fishing
- Jet skiing
- Sailing
- Snorkeling
- Wind surfing

== Weightlifting ==
In the 1972 Summer Olympics in Munich, Mohamed Traboulsi won the silver medal, in addition to many gold medals in continental and regional championships.

== Winter sports ==
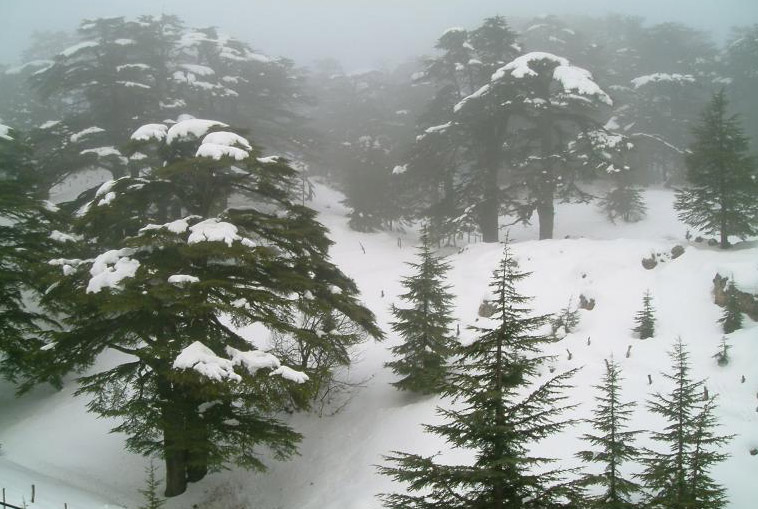
The Cedars Ski Resort

Lebanon has six ski resorts, with slopes for skiers and snowboarders. Off-slope, there are opportunities for cross-country skiing, snowshoeing, and snowmobiling.

== See also ==
- Rangers Sports Events (Lebanon)
- Lebanon at the Olympics
