= Mohammad Zgheib military base =

Military Base in Beirut

- Sidon, South Lebanon

Site information
- Type: Regional headquarters
- Controlled by: Lebanese Armed Forces

Site history
- Built: 1956

Garrison information
- Garrison: Mohammad Zgheib military base

Mohammad Zgheib military base (Arabic: ثكنة محمد زغيب Thouknat Mohamed Zughaib), named after First Lieutenant Mohamed Zughaib who was killed in the Battle of Malkia during the 1948 Arab-Israeli War., is the headquarters of the Lebanese Army South regional command located in Sidon, 43 km from Beirut.

== History ==
The military base was founded in 1956, by the Lebanese army, in order to govern its forces distributed in the southern Lebanese region. Since 1948, ground forces such as the Second Artillery Regiment, the Sixth Brigade and an armored regiment, have positioned in its barracks till the mid-1970s. Later, the location where the present military base (in Sidon) was established, constituted of the Officers' club, Banu Barakat military base in Tyre (founded in 1958) and Marjayoun military base in Marjayoun (founded in the early 1940s). In 1982, the Israeli air-strikes destroyed several buildings in the base, however several damaged facilities were later reconstructed.

== Mission ==
The missions of the military base include:

- Supply of food and other necessities to the differing forces distributed in the South region.
- Supply of fuel and other lubricants to the vehicles and armed tanks.
- Maintenance

== Organizational structure ==
The region's command personnel spread in several locations in the Nabatieh and South Governorates, which include Sidon and Tyre military bases, the government hospital, Tebnine Hospital and Marjayoun military base. In addition, ground forces centered in the south include the Second, Third and Ninth Brigades, along with the internal forces positioned there. Several regional elements are positioned in the military base, including equipment, operation, intelligence, and conscription, in addition to other minor branches. The base also includes the South regional command, which was founded in 1970 and which currently contains a command and service force, a defense and guard force and a supply and transport force. Recently, a conscription facility was established in order to contain the new conscripts of the southern region, along with a financial center similar to the branch located in Badaro, Beirut.

== Emblem ==
The emblem of the South regional command consists of an eagle on top of Sidon Sea Castle, surrounded by two laurel leaves on a background of the South Lebanon region.

== See also ==
- Lebanese Armed Forces
- South Governorate
