= Military ranks of Lebanon =

The military ranks of Lebanon are the military insignia used by the Lebanese Armed Forces. Being a former French mandate, Lebanon shares a rank structure similar to that of France.

== Commissioned officer ranks ==
The rank insignia of commissioned officers.

Rank group	General / flag officers			Senior officers			Junior officers
Lebanese Ground Forces
Lebanese Ground Forces	عماد; Eimad	لواء; Liwa	عميد; Amid	عقيد; Aqid	مقدم; Muqaddam	رائد; Ra'id	نقيب; Naqib	ملازم أول; Mulazim awwal	ملازم; Mulazim
Lebanese Navy
Lebanese Navy	عماد; Eimad	لواء; Liwa	عميد; Amid	عقيد; Aqid	مقدم; Muqaddam	رائد; Ra'id	نقيب; Naqib	ملازم أول; Mulazim awwal	ملازم; Mulazim
Lebanese Air Force
Lebanese Air Force	عماد; Eimad	لواء; Liwa	عميد; Amid	عقيد; Aqid	مقدم; Muqaddam	رائد; Ra'id	نقيب; Naqib	ملازم أول; Mulazim awwal	ملازم; Mulazim
Rank group	General / flag officers			Senior officers			Junior officers

=== Student officer ranks ===
Rank group	Student officer
Lebanese Armed Forces
Lebanese Armed Forces	تلميذ ضابط سنة ثالثة; Tilmidh dabit sanat 3	تلميذ ضابط سنة ثانية; Tilmidh dabit sanat 2	تلميذ ضابط سنة أولى; Tilmidh dabit sanat 1

== Other ranks ==
The rank insignia of non-commissioned officers and enlisted personnel.

Rank group	Senior NCOs						Junior NCOs		Enlisted
Lebanese Ground Forces										No insignia
Lebanese Ground Forces	مؤهل أول; Muahal 'awal	مؤهل; Muahal	معاون أوّل; Maawan 'awal	معاون; Maawan	رقيب أوّل; Raqib awwl	رقيب; Raqīb	عريف أول; Earif 'awal	عريف; Earif	جندي أول; Jundiun 'awal	جندي; Jundiun
Lebanese Navy										No insignia
Lebanese Navy	مؤهل أول; Muahal 'awal	مؤهل; Muahal	معاون أوّل; Maawan 'awal	معاون; Maawan	رقيب أوّل; Raqib awwl	رقيب; Raqīb	عريف أول; Earif 'awal	عريف; Earif	جندي أول; Jundiun 'awal	جندي; Jundiun
Lebanese Air Force										No insignia
Lebanese Air Force	مؤهل أول; Muahal 'awal	مؤهل; Muahal	معاون أوّل; Maawan 'awal	معاون; Maawan	رقيب أوّل; Raqib awwl	رقيب; Raqīb	عريف أول; Earif 'awal	عريف; Earif	جندي أول; Jundiun 'awal	جندي; Jundiun
Rank group	Senior NCOs						Junior NCOs		Enlisted
