= Lebanese Army Skiing and Mountain Fighting School =

- Flag of the Skiing and Mountain Fighting School
- Active: May 1, 1986 - Present
- Country: Lebanon
- Type: Military School
- Part of: Lebanese Armed Forces
- Garrison/HQ: Youssef Rahmeh military base, Cedar

Insignia
- Emblem

The Skiing and Mountain Fighting School (Arabic: مدرسة التزلج والقتال في الجبال Madrasat al-Tazaloj wal Kital feiljibal) is part of the Lebanese Armed Forces. The school is located in the mountainous area of Cedar (Arz), in Mount Lebanon, and is mainly responsible for conducting ski and combat in mountains sessions.

== History ==
The Skiing and Mountain Fighting School was founded in 1986.

However the site's use can be traced back fifty years earlier than this; in 1934, the French army founded a ski team of both French and Lebanese soldiers, they rented a place in Bsharri and trained at the Cedars. In 1935 they moved to the Cedars Grand Hotel until the foundation of the school in 1937 by the French army. Since the foundation of the school the French army started training the Lebanese soldiers.

In 1940, Arz military base was handed over to the Lebanese Army, and was called the Skiing School and was directly linked to the Lebanese Army High Center for Military Sport until it became independent on May 1, 1986.

=== Important dates ===
- In 1957 the Lebanese president Camille Chamoun, the Iranian Shah and his wife, visited the school.
- In 1962 the school has accomplished a searching mission of trouble makers who took refuge in mount Tannourine.
- In 1963 till 1975 the school organized the international military championship of ski and Lebanese championship.
- In 1969 a successful searching mission was accomplished after they found soldiers lost in Sheikh mountains.
- The school participated in international ski championship in Iran, Norway (1974), Switzerland (1975), Finland (1982), Norway (1999), Austria (2000).
- Every year the school participates to searching missions and rescue missions of persons lost and blocked in snow weather.
- The school trains every year sessions of ski and combat in mountains to many troops of the Lebanese army.
- The school participates to all Lebanese and military championship.

== Mission ==
The mission of the school include:

- Missions of combat in mountains in all weather conditions.
- Training sessions of ski and combat in mountains.
- Missions of searching and rescue of people lost and blocked in snow weather.
- Participation in the organization and formation of the children of the army camp in summer.

== Capabilities ==
The trainees participate in combat in all weather conditions to search and rescue people lost and blocked in snowy weather. Training sessions of ski and combat in mountains are delivered, in addition to several participations in international and local military championships.

== Emblem ==
The symbol of the school is constituted of a skiing soldier representing the combat in mountains and searching mission, white representing the purity of the snow of the Lebanese mountains, mountains which represent the height, in addition to the depiction of Cedar trees (the symbol of the nation) and two laurel leaves representing gratitude.

== See also ==
- Fouad Shehab Command and Staff College
- Military Academy
- Lebanese Army Teaching Institute
