= Lebanese Army High Center for Military Sport =

Lebanese Armed Forces military unit

High Center for Military Sport
- High Center for Military Sport Flag
- Active: 1943–Present
- Country: Lebanon
- Type: Military College
- Part of: Lebanese Armed Forces
- Garrison/HQ: Dekweneh-Mar Roukoz

Insignia
- Emblem

The High Center for Military Sport (Arabic: المركز العالي للرياضة العسكرية al-Markaz al-aali lel reyada al-Askariya) is a Lebanese Armed Forces sports center, established in 1943, and is concerned with maintaining the physical fitness of soldiers, organize sports championships, and prepare soldiers for local and international competitions.

== History ==
The center was established in 1943 by the French army as a part of the combat and skiing school in Haret Hreik, it was composed of one single sports hall and two offices. The center was later handed over to the LAF in 1946, which appointed Captain Aziz Addab as a first commander.

In 1968 Lebanon was chosen as a center of the middle east connection related to the international military sports council (CISM), and this became the responsibility of this center. In 1978, the LAF decided to change the name of the center, and since then it has become the High Center for Military Sport instead of Combat School.

During the 1982 Lebanon War the Israeli bombardment destroyed its fields, buildings and infrastructure.

== Mission ==
The missions of the High Sports Military Center are centered on the army and sports federation. For the army the center is to help maintain the physical fitness of soldiers, organize sports championships, organize private practices and tournaments for practice, prepare soldiers for international competition, and to give technical advice to all military units. For the sports federation the center must prepare army teams in groups and as individuals to participate in local and international sports championship and to coordinate with the Ministry of Sport and the Lebanese Olympic committee and other special organization to organize a friendly events.

== Organization and Structure ==
The current command structure is as follows:

1. Command of the center.
2. Branches and the secretariats.
3. Platoon of services.
4. Platoon of sports teams.

=== Establishments and Stadiums ===
- Halls of combats games (Judo, Taekwondo, body building, Fencing, Boxing, Wrestling).
- Fields (Volleyball, Handball, Basketball, football).

On January 15, 2003 a new military sports complex was opened, President Emile Lahoud military sports complex was established in Mar Roukoz, Dahr Al Housayn. The new complex includes:

- Indoor halls for ball games (basketball, volleyball, and handball) with a capacity of 3000 spectators seats.
- Different halls of combat games (judo, taekwondo, wrestling, boxing).
- A modern shooting field.

== See also ==
- Lebanese Armed Forces
- Lebanese Army Military Academy
- Lebanese Army Skiing and Mountain Fighting School
