= Rangers Sports Events =

The Rangers Sports Events are sports events organized yearly in Lebanon by the Rangers Regiment of the Lebanese army. The events aim to explore Lebanon's mountains and beauty, promote Lebanon's touristic image by making the events as International on yearly basis and to empower the Military-Civilian interaction.

== Raid des Cedres ==
The Raid des Cedres (RDC) race is a ski-mountaineering competition in the Near East. Since 2008, civilians and military skiers equipped with raquettes or skis de randonnée can compete in crossing a region over the Lebanese mountain peaks. The RDC race includes three tracks from the cedars of Tannourine to the Cedars of God in Bechare:

- First track extends to a distance of around 45 km with an altitude variation above 2200 meters.
- Second track extends to a distance of around 30 km.
- Third track extends to a distance of around 16 km with an altitude variation above 1000 meters.

== Barracks to Barracks ==
Since 2008, Barracks to Barracks is a summer mountain race open to both the military and civilians. The race start at the Rocks Rest house in Laklouk passing by Tomartibeh, Tim El Kbour, Sahlet El Rahwe, Kniset El Rab, Daher El Kadib and ends at the Cedars in Bechare. The race starts at an altitude of 1800 m and ends at an altitude of 2800 m. The race comprise 4 categories:

- Long Track extends to a distance of around 40 km and finish at the Cedars Forest.
- Medium Track extends to a distance of around 23 km and finish at kniset El Rab.
- Short Track extends to a distance of around 12 km and finish at Ain Rouma.
- Biking Race extends to a distance of around 23 km and finish at kniset El Rab.

== Hike with a Ranger ==
Since 2012, JABALNA Association and the Shouf Cedar Reserve organize yearly, in cooperation with the Rangers Regiment, a hike entitled “Meshwar maa' Meghwar” (Hike with a Ranger).

== Ranger for a Day ==
Since 2014, the union of Jezzine municipalities in collaboration of the Rangers Regiment, organize yearly a 20 km March entitled “Koun Meghwar la Nhar" (Ranger for a day). The march starts at Jezzine Square towards Wadi Jezzine, up to the Pines Reserve at Bkassine, passing by Dahr El Ramleh, Haytourah, and Ain Zaarour, down towards Jezzine City and Nabeh Al Saydeh, and finally returning to Jezzine Square. Noting that 2015's event witnessed the participation of over 2,000 citizens.

== Rangers in the field ==
Since 2014, Zgharta-Ehden municipality organize in cooperation with the Rangers Regiment, a joint-drill entitled “Meghawir bel Midan” (Rangers in the field).

== See also ==
- Lebanon Mountain Trail
- Sport in Lebanon
