= Namibia Command and Staff College =

Educational institution of the Namibian Defence Force

- Motto: Leadership and Professionalism
- Type: Staff College
- Established: 2009
- Affiliations: Namibian Defence Force
- Commandant: Brigadier General Benhard Nathinge Erastus
- Location: Okahandja, Namibia
- Campus: Okahandja

The Namibia Command and Staff College is an academic tri service college of the Namibian Defence Force (NDF). The college is located in Okahandja. It offers officers staff training and education.

== History ==
Recognizing the need for advanced academic training for its officers as it depended on friendly nations such as Zambia, Botswana, South Africa, Zimbabwe, Tanzania, Kenya, Nigeria and Ghana, the Ministry of Defence established the College and was launched by the minister of Defence Charles Namoloh on 10 August 2009. Construction of the Okahandja campus commenced, which was financially aided by China and the project was completed in 2016. The campus was then inaugurated by President Hage Geingob on 17 October 2019. Since inception more than 13 Junior Staff Courses have been conducted graduating over 204 officers.

== Programmes ==
Junior Division

- Junior Staff Course

This course is offered to junior officers and the course curriculum is set up into two terms, the first terms focuses on history and Namibian heritage, organization, the role of the Namibian Defence Force, staff duties, logistics, command and control, leadership, geo political studies, law of armed conflict and Industrial visits. The second terms focuses on conventional warfare, low intensity operations, peace support operations and training. The Course is recognized by the Namibia Qualifications Authority as a Diploma in Military Science NQF level 6.

Senior Division

- Senior Command and Staff Course

Its curriculum covers leadership, accountability, responsibilities, staff appointments, regimental, force employment up to division level and industrial visits. As a prerequisite to graduate student officers will write a research paper. The 1st Senior Command and Staff Course was launched in 2019 and graduated in September 2020. Graduates of the Course are given symbol Pass Staff Course 'psc', only officers from the ranks of major/ equivalent, Lieutenant Colonel/equivalent and Colonel/equivalent across all service arms are eligible for this course.

== Commandants ==
Namibia Command and Staff College
From	Commandant	To	Ribbon
Unknown date	Brigadier General Titus Simon	Unknown date	
Unknown date	Brigadier General Joshua Namhindo	2019	
2019	Brigadier General Mathew Shipulwa	2021	
2021	Brigadier General Hendrick Hamukoshi	2024	
2024	Brigadier General Benhard Nathinge Erastus	Incumbent	
