= North Lebanon clashes (2014) =

2014 conflict in Lebanon

North Lebanon Clashes
- Part of Syrian Civil War spillover in Lebanon
- Locations witnessing fighting
Date	24–28 October 2014 (4 days)
Location	North Lebanon
Result	Lebanese Army victory

Belligerents
Islamic State	Lebanon: Lebanese Armed Forces; Internal Security Forces

Commanders and leaders
Sheikh Khaled Hablas; Shadi Mawlawi; Osama Mansur; Sheikh Bilal Diqmaq	General Jean Kahwaji; Walid Salman; Samir Mokbel

Casualties and losses
53 killed 259 captured	11 killed 1 captured
- 8 civilians killed, 150 people on both sides wounded

The North Lebanon clashes were a conflict that occurred in October 2014, between the Lebanese Army and Islamist militants in the area of North Lebanon, being also part of the Syrian Civil War spillover in Lebanon.

== Timeline ==
The clashes were sparked by a successful Internal Security Forces (ISF) cordon-and-search operation, during which explosives, assault rifles and rocket propelled grenades were found in houses located on the Tripoli area. Among the raided houses, one belonged to Khaled al-Daher, a member of the Parliament of Lebanon. Four rifles were confiscated from Daher's property.

On 24 October 2014, the Lebanese army clashed with Islamist militants in the historic center of Tripoli. The fighting erupted when an army patrol came under a hit and run attack, in the Khan al-Askar area of the city. Four soldiers were wounded in the incident.

On 25 October 2014, fighting intensified. At least 11 soldiers, 8 civilians and 22 militants were killed in the battle and 162 militants were arrested. A total of 24 soldiers and civilians were wounded in the fighting. A separate attack occurred in the village of Minieh, in the outskirts of Tripoli. One soldier was killed and two wounded after RPGs were fired at an army vehicle. The Lebanese army responded by firing at rebel positions from helicopters.

On 26 October 2014, four soldiers were killed after an ambush in the town of Dhour Muhammara. One soldier was killed and one was injured in the aftermath of a firefight in the town of Bhannine. Several of the attackers wounded and arrested. The Lebanese army defused three trapped vehicles in front of a school earlier held by the militants.

== Aftermath ==
On 29 October 2014, Lebanese army commander Jean Kahwaji rejected rumors of a secret truce between Islamists and the military. During the day, 71 suspected militants were arrested in the areas of Arsal and the Bekaa Valley.

On 30 October 2014, the Internal Security Forces raided several houses in the Abi Samra neighborhood of Tripoli. Assault rifles, explosives, grenades and other weaponry were confiscated; the weapons belonged to Sheikh Bilal Diqmaq, head of the Iqraa Organization for Social Development. Eight people were arrested in connection with the attacks, and an additional six Syrians were apprehended for lack of identification papers.

On 31 October 2014, six explosive devices were defused near the Rawshani mosque, Tripoli. Two associates of Sheikh Khaled Hablas were arrested in the Zouk al-Habalisa area of Akkar, the army also confiscated weapons and ammunition in the same area.

On 1 November 2014, an army patrol uncovered a large weapons depot, containing 25 assault rifles, grenades and other military equipment in the city of Tripoli. One man was detained, in connection with the discovered weapons.

On 2 November 2014, two men were arrested in Bhannine for carrying out attacks on soldiers; a rocket propelled grenade and military gear were seized.

On 3 November 2014, material damage was caused after three rockets were fired into the Bekaa from the Anti-Lebanon Mountains. Seven people were detained in Tripoli on various charges related to the recent clashes in that city. Militants engaged in a firefight with Lebanese border guards in the Arsal region, after failing to enter into Lebanon.

On 4 November 2014, three people were arrested in Tripoli and five in Bhannine in separate operations carried by the Internal Security Forces. The Lebanese army repelled an attack by jihadist militants attempting to cross into Lebanon near the town of Arsal.

On 5 November 2014, seven suspected militants were arrested in the Dinniyeh region, weapons and military equipment were also confiscated. Two militants were detained also detained in the southern port city of Sidon. Four men were detained in the town of Taanayel, Zahlé district, on charges of illegal weapons possession and conspiring to kidnap.

== See also ==
- Syrian Civil War spillover in Lebanon
- Timeline of violent events relating to the Syrian civil war spillover in Lebanon (2014–present)
- 2nd Infantry Brigade (Lebanon)
