= Operation Benin =

Cotonou (Benin)

Operation Benin, also known as Operation Cotonou, was a rescue mission carried out by the Lebanese Navy SEALs Regiment in Cotonou, Benin between December 26, 2003 and December 30, 2003 This operation is considered to be the first mission carried out by Lebanese Armed Forces units abroad. Its task was to recover bodies and two black boxes from UTA Flight 141.

== Background ==
A UTA Boeing 727-223 heading to Beirut carrying 161 people, mainly Lebanese going to spend the New Year vacation in Lebanon, crashed into the sea shortly after take off resulting in 139 dead on December 25, 2003. The crash is considered to be the worst accident in the Lebanese aviation history as per the number of Lebanese citizens affected. The plane was a private jet operated by a Libyan businessman, who was amongst the few survivors.

== Mission Details ==
=== Receiving Orders ===
At 12:20 a.m., night of December 25–26, 2003, commander of the Lebanese Navy SEALs Regiment General George Chraim receives a call from the Lebanese Armed Forces commander-in-chief General Michel Suleiman ordering him to prepare a Navy SEALs unit to be fully equipped and immediately dispatched to Beirut International Airport, and then fly for a rescuing and bodies recovering mission in Benin, that's in addition to locating the two black boxes.

=== Getting Ready ===
According to Colonel Chraim, some soldiers were called after from their homes; in addition, getting the diving gears and equipment, and boats ready was done within a very short time, as the unit was ready at 2:10 a.m. in the airport, and then boarded an MEA airliner that took off at 2:30 a.m.

=== Arrival at Cotonou ===
The plane reached Cadjehoun Airport at 10 a.m, a French military attache officer and another Beninese were waiting the team in order to guide them through and cooperate on their needs. For the next step the team had to take vehicles prepared by the local Lebanese community to reach the crash scene and start surveying it.

=== Operations ===
Upon arrival to the crash site, the team started clearing the people off the area, and started preparing the gears and equipment. The team then started diving under the plane remains in the water which was mixed up with jet fuel. Shortly after, they started pulling the wreckage to the shore using the available vehicles. The first day ended at 6:00 p.m. as the sunset began. At the morning of the second day, the team returned to the crash site, and divided into two groups:

- First one equipped with two Rigid-hulled inflatable boats, their goal was to scan the surface of the water as far as 10 kilometers into the sea, and to pull out bodies and bring them to shore
- Second group, composed of 7 divers, 3 of which were French, their goal was to dive as deep as 600 meters scanning for bodies and the two black boxes.

At around 1 O'clock the second team was able to find the first black box, later that day, the other box was found. Searching and rescuing continued later that night.

On the third day, a meeting with the officials from Benin, Lebanon, and France was held at the airport to discuss and assess the situation, and concluded that it was time to return to Lebanon.

=== Returning to Lebanon ===
At 1:10 p.m. of the third day, a plane carrying the team and Lebanese officials, in addition to the bodies of the victims took off to Lebanon, and arrived to Beirut International Airport at around 9 p.m. The team directly left the airport to their base to present a report about the mission.

== The team ==
The rescue team included ten members:

1. Colonel George Chraim, commander of the Lebanese Navy SEALs regiment.
2. Captain Fadi Makhoul
3. Captain Haidar Skini
4. Captain Fadi Kfoury
5. First Class Sergeant Mohamed Mrad
6. First Class Sergeant Simon Makhlouf
7. First Class Sergeant Talal Zein
8. First Class Sergeant Mohamed Msheimesh
9. Corporal Antranique Youssef

== See also ==
- Lebanese Navy SEALs Regiment
