= Tomb of the Unknown Soldier (Lebanon) =

Military memorial in Beirut

Coordinates: 33.8786°N 35.5154°E

Tomb of the Unknown Soldier in Lebanon
- Lebanese Armed Forces
- For members of the Legion of the Orient, Army of the Levant and Lebanese Armed Forces who were killed and have no known grave
- Unveiled: August 1, 1945; 81 years ago
- Location: near Beirut City, Mathaf
- المجد والخلود لشهدائنا الأبطال (As inscribed in Arabic along with a Cedrus Libani centered by Laurus nobilis & Roman columns.) "Gloire et Éternité à nos Héros Martyrs" (Fr) "Glory and Immortality for our Martyred Heroes" (Eng)

The Tomb of the Unknown Soldier in Beirut, Lebanon, commemorates Lebanese soldiers who served and died during the French Mandate of Lebanon from 1920 to 1943; of the Legion of the Orient (a unit formed by the French in 1916, during World War I) and its successor the Army of the Levant. The tomb also represents the forming and independence of the Lebanese Armed Forces from the French Armed Forces in 1943. The cenotaph in the middle includes a Cedrus libani tree centered by a laurel; the main symbol of Roman legions. Around the cedar tree and laurel reads in Arabic: "Glory and Immortality for our Martyred Heroes". Behind the cenotaph are original Roman columns that date back to the time of the Roman Empire.

== See also ==
- Troupes coloniales
