= Lebanese Armed Forces =

Combined military forces of Lebanon

- القوات المسلحة اللبنانية (Arabic)
- Emblem of the Lebanese Armed Forces

- Flag of the Lebanese Armed Forces
- Motto: "Honor, Sacrifice, Loyalty" (شرف · تضحية · وفاء, Charaf, Tadhieh, Wafaa)
- Founded: 1 August 1945
- Current form: 1991
- Service branches: Lebanese Ground Forces; Lebanese Republican Guard; Lebanese Air Force; Lebanese Navy
- Headquarters: Yarze, Lebanon
- Website: Official website

Leadership
- Commander-in-chief: President Joseph Aoun
- Prime Minister: Nawaf Salam
- Minister of Defense: Michel Menassa
- Commander of the Armed Forces: General Rodolphe Haykal

Personnel
- Military age: 18–30 years of age for voluntary military service
- Conscription: No (abolished in 2007)
- Active personnel: 60,000
- Reserve personnel: 0

Expenditure
- Budget: $635 million (FY2024)

Industry
- Foreign suppliers: France; Germany; Italy; United States; Russia; United Kingdom
- Annual exports: Weapons and equipment

Related articles
- History: 1948 Arab–Israeli War; 1958 Lebanon crisis 1961 Lebanese coup attempt The War over Water; Six-Day War; Lebanese Civil War: Battle of the Hotels; Hundred Days' War; Multinational Force in Lebanon 1982–1984; Mountain War; February 6 Intifada; War of the Camps; War of Liberation; War of Elimination; Battle of Sidon (1991); Operation Dinnieh; Operation Benin; Global War on Terrorism: United Nations Interim Force in Lebanon (1978–present); Israeli–Lebanese conflict; South Lebanon conflict (1985–2000); 2000–2006 Shebaa Farms conflict; 2006 Lebanon War; Operation Nahr el Bared; 2008 conflict in Lebanon; 2010 Israel–Lebanon border clash; Syrian Civil War spillover in Lebanon; 2013 Sidon clash; Qalamoun offensive (2014); Battle of Arsal (2014); 2024 Lebanon War; Hezbollah–Syria clashes (2024–present): Lebanon–Syria border clashes (March 2025–present)
- Ranks: Military ranks of Lebanon

The Lebanese Armed Forces (LAF; Arabic: القوات المسلحة اللبنانية, romanized: Al-Quwwāt al-Musallaḥa al-Lubnāniyya), also known as the Lebanese Army (الجيش اللبناني, Al-Jaish al-Lubnani), is the national military of Lebanon. It consists of three branches, the ground forces, the air force, and the navy. The motto of the Lebanese Armed Forces is "Honor, Sacrifice, Loyalty" (شرف · تضحية · وفاء, Charaf, Tadhieh, Wfe3). In politically unstable Lebanon, the Lebanese army has been described as one of the few state institutions in the country trusted by both the Lebanese population and the international community; and a guarantor of stability in multi-sectarian Lebanon.

== Emblem ==
The Lebanese Armed Forces emblem consists of a Lebanon cedar tree surrounded by two laurel leaves, positioned above the symbols of the three branches: the ground forces represented by the two bayonets, the navy represented by an anchor, and the air force represented by two wings.

== General overview ==
The Lebanese Armed Forces' primary missions include defending Lebanon and its citizens against external aggression, maintaining internal stability and security, confronting threats against the country's vital interests, engaging in social development activities and undertaking relief operations in coordination with public and humanitarian institutions.

The armed forces consist of 90,200 active personnel with the ground force consisting of approximately 80,000 troops, the air force 2,500 personnel and 1,700 in the naval force. The remaining personnel are commanders, advisors, engineers and members of the special forces. The LAF is an all-volunteer force. All three branches are operated and coordinated by the LAF Commander; a position customarily held by a Maronite Catholic Christian, from the ministry of defence which is located in Yarzeh, east of Lebanon's capital, Beirut. The current commander in chief of the Lebanese Armed Forces is General Rodolphe Haykal. Currently [when?], the LAF is ranked sixth in the world in terms of growth, with the number of military personnel doubling over the period between 1985 and 2000. The country has six military colleges and schools. Lebanese officers are sent to other countries such as the United States, Russia or other parts of Europe to receive additional training.

The equipment of the LAF is outdated due to lack of funds, political bickering and until the 2000s, the presence of foreign forces. The Lebanese government is working with its partners to improve the armed forces' capabilities. After the conclusion of the Lebanese Civil War, the LAF decided to repair as much of its equipment as it could, while being aided by modest donations from other states. The United States remains a key partner for Lebanon in this improvement process. About 85% of the LAF's equipment is US-made, with the remaining being UK, French, and Soviet-made.

== History ==
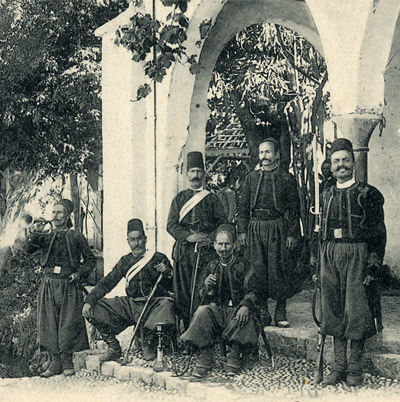
Lebanese soldiers during the mutasarrif period

During the period of semi-autonomous province of Mount Lebanon Mutasarrifate between 1861 and 1914, the province reportedly had its own army of volunteer militias which gained the attention of a traveler in 1914, contending: "the free independent bearing of these mountaineers was in striking contrast to that of the underpaid, underfed and poorly clothed conscripts of the regular [Ottoman] army".

The beginnings of the modern Lebanese Army arose during 1916, when the French government established the "Legion of the Orient", which included Lebanese soldiers. After a post-World War I League of Nations mandate was established over Lebanon in April 1920, France formed the Army of the Levant, which was later reorganized to include the locally recruited Troupes Spéciales du Levant (Special Troops of the Levant). These indigenous troops were diverse units composed of Lebanese, Syrian, Circassian and Kurdish enlisted personnel; all commanded predominantly by French officers. By 1938, the Troupes Speciales numbered 10,000 with 306 officers, of whom only 88 were French. In addition to the locally engaged Troupes Speciales; North African, Senegalese and French military units served in Syria and the Lebanon.

Later in 1926, the Lebanese First Sharp Shooters Unit was created out of the Special Troops of the Levant; it is considered to be a direct precursor to the Lebanese Armed Forces (LAF).

During World War II, Lebanese troops fought in Lebanon with the Vichy French forces against Free French and British forces. After the Vichy forces in the Middle East surrendered in July 1941, volunteers from the Troupes Spéciales du Levant enlisted in the Free French forces and participated in combat in Italy, North Africa, and southern France. In 1943, prior to the declaration of Lebanese independence, all the military units were combined in one brigade, the Fifth Brigade, under the command of General Fouad Chehab. On the day Lebanon declared independence, the Lebanese Third Sharp Shooters (tirailleurs) Regiment was placed at the disposal of the Lebanese government in order to maintain security. In June of the same year, the French reconstituted units of the Troupes Spéciales du Levant, which were then attached to the British forces in the Middle East. The majority of the Lebanese Armed Forces remained a part of the French Army in Lebanon.

=== Post-independence ===
After Lebanon gained independence in 1943, the Lebanese government formed an official delegation in 1944 to negotiate with the French the terms related to handing over the LAF. After nearly three weeks of talks, the joint French-British Command decreed that responsibility for armed units under French control was to be handed over to the Independent Government of Lebanon. These units were part of the Troupes Spéciales du Levant and totaled about 3,000 men. On August 1, 1945, at 00:00 hours, the LAF was placed under full authority of the Lebanese National Government; this day is commemorated annually as Lebanese Army Day.

The Lebanese Army first flag under Independent Lebanon

After establishing authority over the LAF in 1945, the Lebanese government intentionally kept its armed forces small and weak due to the country's unique internal politics. Christian politicians feared that Muslims might use the armed forces as a vehicle for seizing power in a military coup. They also appeared unwilling to incur the cost of maintaining a large well equipped army. Many Christian Lebanese also feared that a large army would inevitably force Lebanon into the Arab–Israeli conflict. However, Muslim politicians were also worried that a strong army could be used against Muslim interests because it would be commanded by Christians. At the same time they tended to feel that the military should be strong enough to play a part in the Arab-Israeli struggle. In addition to the two major conflicting views, prominent Lebanese politicians of the myriad of religious denominations in Lebanon have also tended to be feudal warlords commanding their own private militias and feared that a strong army would endanger their personal power.

On 6 June 1948, the 3rd battalion of the Lebanese Army, backed by Arab Liberation Army, fought Israeli forces occupying the Lebanese villages of Qadas and Malkieh and captured them, subsequently handing them over to the ALA and withdrawing by 8 July. This was the first major combat operation for the Lebanese Armed Forces under the independent Lebanese government.

=== Role in post 2005 Lebanon ===
The Lebanese military has been described by the Economist as one of the few respected institutions left in a fragmented Lebanon. Under the leadership of General Joseph Aoun, the army has been considered immune to sectarian preferences as well as immune to corruption. According to Nicholas Nasser, the LAF is "one of the few institutions that command the trust of both the vast majority of Lebanese citizens and international stakeholders". Nasser described the army as the embodiment of a multi sectarian society which is able to work together.

The Lebanese army today has 80,000 troops. Due to sectarian pressures and the fragmented political system, the Lebanese army is held back from fulfilling its obligations to disarm Hizbullah. However the Lebanese military has been able to "operate as a police force", preventing sectarian violence and resolving tensions between refugees and local Christians. The military has also kept watch on Shia refugees in non Shia areas fleeing warzones. According to The Economist, the army has also fought armed sectarian groups within Lebanon. The LAF is also seen as key to maintaining stability within Lebanon.

=== Centralized weapon control ===
Following the Israel–Hezbollah conflict that began in 2023, the killing of Nasrallah, Hezbollah weakening and the ceasefire agreement between Israel and Lebanon, the new Lebanese government agreed on centralizing weapons control in the country. This meant disarmament of all armed militias in Lebanon, when the biggest issue is the disarmament of Hezbollah. On 5 September 2025 General Rodolphe Haykal presented to the government a multi-stage disarmament roadmap.

The roadmap presented to the Cabinet on 5 September 2025, has 5 phases:

Phase 1

During this phase the Lebanese army will complete the disarmament south of the Litani River, where a substantial weapons were already collected with the help of UNIFIL.

Phase 2

Will expand the operation to north of the Litani River up to the Awali River, that is as the entryway to South Lebanon.

Phase 3

Will see concentrate on Beirut and its suburbs in order to centralize control in a politically sensitive area.

Phase 4

Will put the focus on the Bekaa Valley region, extending disarmament reach into eastern Lebanon.

Phase 5

the final phase of the roadmap will see further activities in the rest of the country, including northern parts of Lebanon, ensuring nationwide enforcement.

== Branches ==
=== Armed Forces Command ===
The LAF Command is headquartered at Yarzeh. The Military Council has six members which includes the Army Commander, the Chief of Staff and four generals representing the Sunnis, Shi’a, Greek Orthodox and Greek Catholic.

- The Commander-in-Chief
- The Commander of the Armed Forces
- The Chief of staff
- Deputy Chiefs of Staff
- Various Directorates

=== Chiefs of staff ===
- Tawfiq Salem (August 1 1945 - December 31 1958)
- Youssef Shmait (January 1 1959 - June 11 1971)
- Saeed Nasrallah (June 12 1971 - June 30 1976)
- Mounir Tarabay (May 3 1977 - February 14 1983)
- Nadim Al-Hakim (February 15 1983 - August 22 1984)
- Mahmoud Tayy Abu Dargham (November 14 1984 - June 30 1987)
- Riyad Takieddine (January 16 1991 - June 39 1997)
- Samir Al-Qadi (July 24 1997 - June 30 2000)
- Fadi Abu Shakra (July 1 2000 - November 1 2002)
- Ramzi Abu Hamza (November 1 2002 - July 22 2005)
- Shawqi Al-Masry (October 10 2005 - April 7 2011)
- Walid Salman (April 7 2011 - September 30 2016)
- Hatem Mallak (October 1 2016 - October 15 2018)
- Amin Al-Aram (April 4 2019 - December 25 2022)
- Hassan Awda (February 8 2024 - 13 March 2025)
- Major General Rodolphe Haykal (13 March 2025 - present)

=== Lebanese Ground Forces ===
The Lebanese Ground Forces (Arabic: القوات البريّة, romanized: al-quwwat al-barriya, lit. 'Ground Forces') are by far the largest of the three branches of the military.

The Lebanese Ground Forces consist of:

- 5 Regional Commands
  - Beirut Region
  - Bekaa Region
  - Mount Lebanon Region
  - North Region
  - South Region
- 11 Brigades
  - 5 Heavy (Mechanised) Brigades
    - 1st Infantry Brigade
    - 2nd Infantry Brigade
    - 3rd Infantry Brigade
    - 5th Infantry Brigade
    - 6th Infantry Brigade
  - 6 Light Brigades
    - 7th Infantry Brigade
    - 8th Infantry Brigade
    - 9th Infantry Brigade
    - 10th Infantry Brigade
    - 11th Infantry Brigade
    - 12th Infantry Brigade
- 1st Artillery Regiment
- 2nd Artillery Regiment
- Signals Regiment
- Lebanese Commando Regiment
  - Includes the Mountain Combat Company.
- Lebanese Airborne Regiment
- Counter-Sabotage Regiment (Moukafaha)
- 1st Intervention Force Regiment
- 2nd Intervention Force Regiment
- 3rd Intervention Force Regiment
- 4th Intervention Force Regiment
- 5th Intervention Force Regiment
- 6th Intervention Force Regiment
- Republican Guard Brigade
- Medical Brigade
- Support Brigade
- Logistics Brigade
- Military Police
- Army Band
- Independent Construction Regiment
- 1st Land Border Regiment
- 2nd Land Border Regiment
- 3rd Land Border Regiment
- 4th Land Border Regiment

The Fourth Brigade was previously active but was disbanded in 1984.

=== Lebanese Air Force ===
The Lebanese Air Force (Arabic: القوات الجوية اللبنانية, romanized: al-quwwat al-jawiyah al-lubnaniyah) currently has a number of helicopters and fixed-wing aircraft including the Bell UH-1H Huey, Aérospatiale SA 330 Puma, Gazelle, Cessna Caravan, and various others. The air force is currently in the process of restoring its jet capabilities and considering the purchase of a small number of fighters or jet trainers.

=== Lebanese Naval Forces ===
The Lebanese Navy, officially the Lebanese Naval Forces (Arabic: القوات البحرية اللبنانية, romanized: al-quwwat al-bahriya al-lubnaniyah) is responsible for protecting Lebanon's territorial waters, ports, and fighting illegal smuggling of goods. At the head of the naval hierarchy is the Navy Command, then it branches off into the quarter-general of the Navy, the Department of Naval Equipment Stores, the Naval School, Beirut Naval Base and the Jounieh Naval Base.

The navy, which currently lacks a suitable amount of equipment, has approximately 50 vessels of various sizes and roles; however, it is trying to modernize itself and increase its size.

=== Lebanese Special Forces ===
The Lebanese Special Forces are the elite of the Lebanese Armed Forces. Those who enroll are subjected to rigorous training regimes and must be in peak physical and mental condition prior to their ascension to such a highly desired position. Each branch of the Armed Forces maintains its own form of Special Forces or Commandos. These include:

- Commando Regiment (Also known as the Maghaweer)
- Lebanese Airborne Regiment - Moujawkal
- Marine Commandos
- Lebanese counter-terrorism and sabotage unit (Moukafaha)
- Panthers (part of the Internal Security Force, i.e. police)

In 2008, the Lebanese Armed Forces started establishing the Lebanese Special Operations Command in order to group the LAF's elite units. These special operations forces will include the Airborne Regiment, the Rangers Regiment, the Navy Commandos Regiment, and the Counter-Sabotage Regiment of the Military Intelligence. The initial size of the force will be less than two brigades, around 5,000 troops, but the plan is to enlarge it up to three brigades.

=== Colleges and schools ===
The Lebanese Armed Forces has six official military colleges and schools that serve a wide variety of functions from officer training to overseeing national youth conscription programs. The recent emphasis on the First Flag Service Center is designed to help overcome the diverse nature of the population. The schools and colleges are:

- Fouad Shehab Command and Staff College
- High Center for Military Sport
- Lebanese Army Military Academy
- Skiing and Mountain Fighting School
- Teaching Institute
- Air Force Aviation School
- Naval Academy
- Lebanese Special Forces School

The Staff and Command College, Military Academy, and Mountain Skiing Fighting School are training centers for Lebanese soldiers designed to upgrade the quality of their skills while the High Center for Military Sport is designed to keep them in peak physical shape (it also organizes sports groups and teams for international competition as well). The Training Institute is designed to help soldiers specialize in certain aspects of the military, such as artillery and defense.

== Equipment ==
The Lebanese Army still uses equipment mostly received through donations or friendly prices. Its workhorse is the M113 which is commonly used by every regiment and brigade. A collection of Western and Soviet-made weaponry and equipment exists ranging from rifles to tanks. However, the Lebanese Army is trying to re-arm and modernize itself through new aid and purchases from various countries, such as the United States, Belgium, Russia, and the Netherlands. A list of awaiting-for-delivery armaments is constantly growing and includes T-80 tanks, M198 Howitzers, etc. A Russian promise to supply Lebanon with T-90 tanks was in discussion since the Lebanese Defense Minister's visit to Russia on December 16, 2008.

Throughout its history, the Lebanese Army employed different weapons and equipment which, at the time, were considered state-of-the-art. Most of these arms have either been phased out of service or sold to other countries. Among the major equipment that is not currently active are the AMX-13, Saladin, Panhard M3, and Staghound vehicles. The Lebanese air force has five A-29 Super Tucano aircraft as well as three Huey II helicopters delivered to it from the United States. The Lebanese air force in total holds 18 UAVs as well as 68 aircraft.

== Military ranks ==
The military ranks are as follows:

Rank group	General / flag officers			Senior officers			Junior officers
Lebanese Ground Forces
Lebanese Ground Forces	عماد; Eimad	لواء; Liwa	عميد; Amid	عقيد; Aqid	مقدم; Muqaddam	رائد; Ra'id	نقيب; Naqib	ملازم أول; Mulazim awwal	ملازم; Mulazim

== Uniforms ==
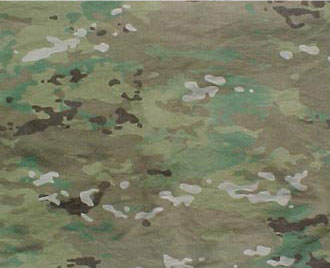
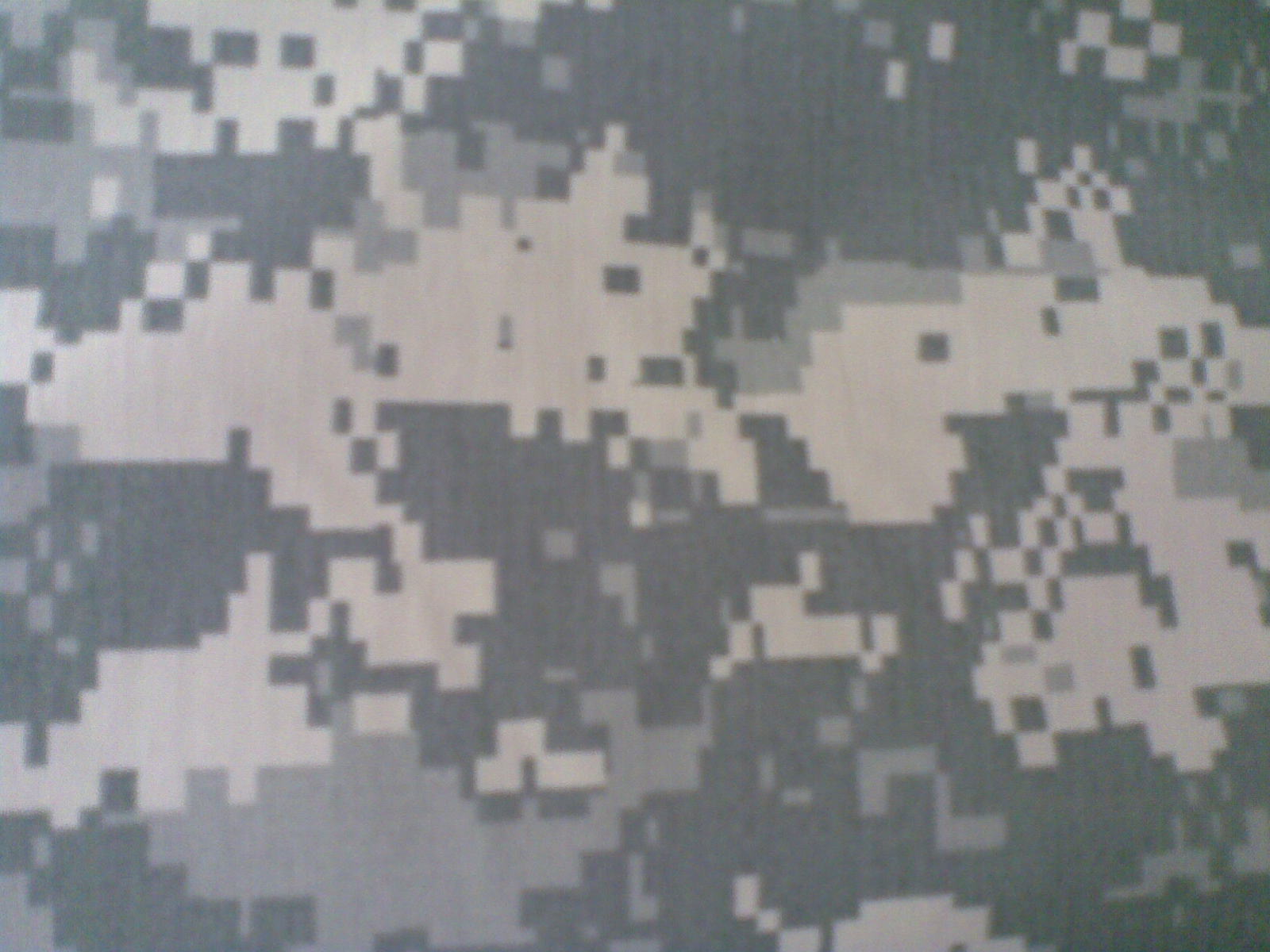
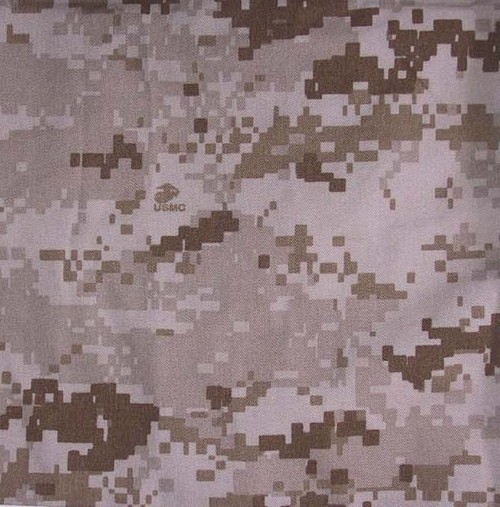
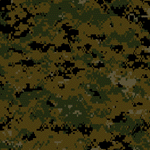
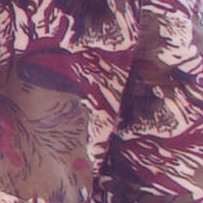
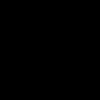
Image
Name	Operational Camouflage Pattern	UCP	MARPAT desert pattern	MARPAT Woodland	Lizard Camouflage	Black Camouflage
Users	All units since 21 November 2017	Marine Commandos	Airborne Regiment	Commando Regiment	Moukafaha	Marine Commandos

== Training ==
Training of new conscripts takes place in the First Flag Service Center (FFSC). After a week of enlisting, they submit to two training courses, the common military training basic course and the specific course. All these courses are organized in details according to a program determining hours of training taking into consideration the conscript rank. The first course consists of 240 hours equivalent to 9 weeks and the training program is composed of:

- Military rules and regulations
- Technical and tactical education
- Weapons
- Physical fitness
- Orientation and moral preparation

The second course consists of 84 hours equivalent to three weeks. The infantry course is composed of:

- Physical fitness
- Drill
- Infantry weapons, which are available in the Lebanese army and its tactics.

== Combat history ==
=== 1975–1990 Lebanese Civil War ===
As the civil war escalated, Lebanese militias grew stronger and soon surpassed the regular army. This rapidly undermined the authority of the central government. The government's ability to maintain order was also handicapped by the nature of the Lebanese Army. One of the smallest in the Middle East, it was composed based on a fixed ratio of religions. As members defected to sectarian militias, the army would eventually prove unable to contain the militant groups, rein in the PLO or monitor foreign infiltration. Since the government was Christian-dominated, especially the officers' ranks, trust among Muslims for central institutions, including the army, was low. The disintegration of the Lebanese Army was eventually initiated by Muslim deserters declaring that they would no longer take orders from the Maronite generals.

=== 1991 Taif Agreement ===
On 4 July 1991, following the failure of disarmament negotiations, as required by the Taif Agreement, the Lebanese Army attacked Palestinian positions in Southern Lebanon. The offensive, involving 10,000 troops against an estimated 5,000 militia, lasted 3 days and ended with the Army taking all the Palestinian positions around Sidon. In the agreement that followed all heavy weapons were surrendered and infantry weapons only allowed in the two refugee camps, Ain al-Hilweh and Mieh Mieh. 73 people were killed in the fighting, and 200 wounded, mostly Palestinian.

=== 1999–2000 Dinnieh fighting ===
During December 1999–January 2000, an Islamic group launched a failed uprising against the Lebanese authorities in the Dinnieh district. In a period of 8 days of fighting in the snow-blanketed mountains east of the northern port of Tripoli, 14 soldiers and 25 rebels were killed.

=== 2006 Lebanon War ===
In the 2006 Lebanon War, the LAF did not engage in a direct conflict with the Israeli Army, despite its threat of retaliation if the IDF pushed too far northward into Lebanon. However, Israel did bomb several Lebanese military bases. While providing aid to civilians, Lebanese troops helped to uphold order in city streets, directed refugees to safer areas, and assisted with overlooking damage done by Israeli attacks. On several occasions, Lebanese troops fired anti-air weapons at Israeli aircraft, but no damage was documented. Overall, 49 Lebanese soldiers were killed.

After the 2006 Lebanon War, the LAF deployed south of the Litani River for the first time since 1968 to enforce Security Council Resolution 1701. The LAF says it will not, and cannot, disarm Hezbollah by force. On August 3, 2010, the Lebanese army fired at Israeli soldiers whose crane lifted a soldier across the border to remove a tree off the fence; Israeli troops returned fire. Three LAF soldiers, one Israeli officer and one Lebanese journalist were killed in the incident (after Israeli artillery & aircraft bombing). According to UN reports, there was no evidence that an Israeli soldier had entered Lebanese territory. The UNIFIL force stationed in the south described the shootout as a "serious incident".

=== 2007 North Lebanon conflict ===
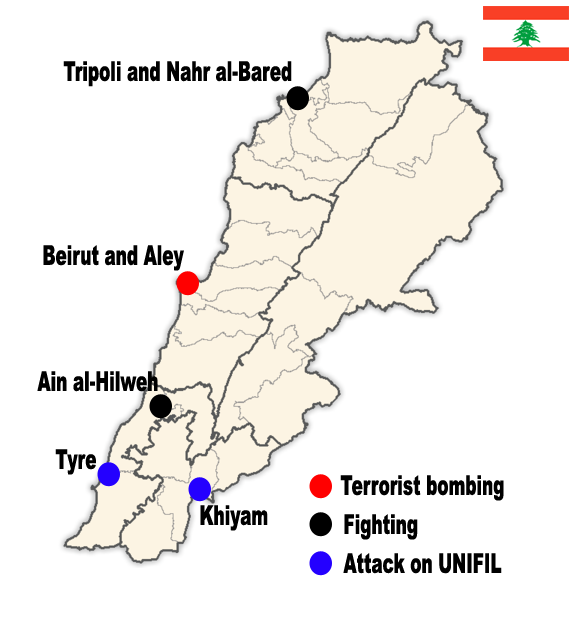
Location of events

The 2007 Lebanon conflict began when fighting broke out between Fatah al-Islam, an Islamic terrorist organization, and the Lebanese Armed Forces on May 20, 2007, in Nahr al-Bared, a Palestinian refugee camp near Tripoli. It has been the most severe internal fighting since Lebanon's 1975–90 civil war. The primary theater of conflict was the Siege of Nahr el-Bared. There was heavy use of Lebanese artillery in that area to eliminate snipers posted around the cities. The conflict finally ended on September 2, 2007, with the Lebanese Army taking control of the camp after more than three months of heavy fights and a death toll of 155 commandos and infantrymen. The LAF Engineering Corps achieved what was seen as a feat of ingenuity during the conflict where they converted a number of UH-1 helicopters into bombers, arming them with 250 kg and 400 kg conventional bombs from old Hunter and Mirage III fighter jets. Some helicopters were also fitted with French Matra rocket pods. This was, according to observers, a decisive step that considerably shortened the conflict.

=== 2008 clashes in Lebanon ===
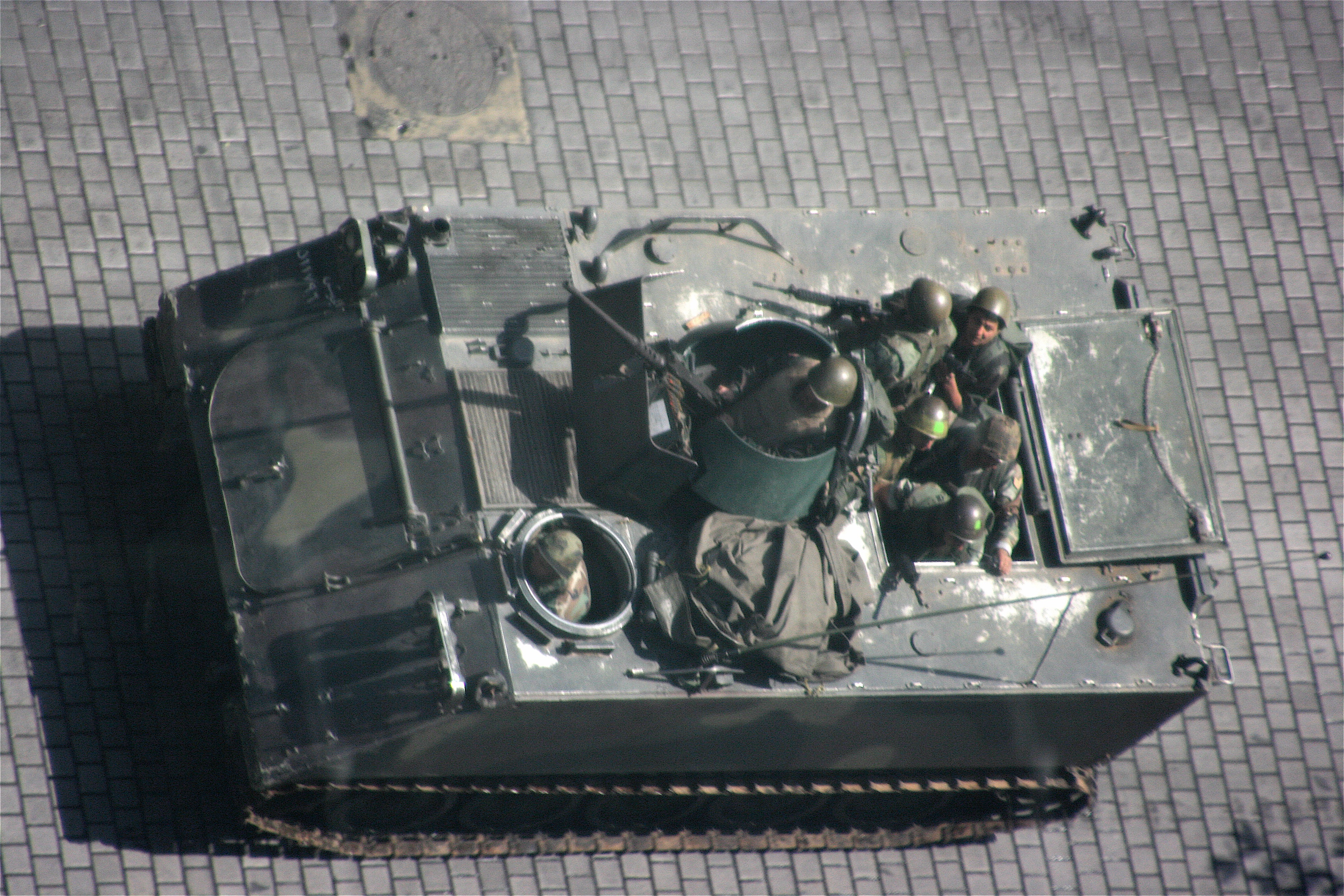
A Lebanese M113 APC in Beirut, during the unrest of May 9, 2008.

During the week-long clashes that occurred at the beginning of May 2008 in Beirut and other regions of the country, the army was unable to prevent rival Lebanese groups from fighting each other. This was because the army, along with the government, had thought it would have been better if rival groups would eventually end the violence and sort out the dispute between them alone, other than involving the national army which may have led to great divisions between the soldiers, just like in the civil war. It would have also caused an outcry from the soldiers who could have died, leading to even greater divisions and blame on the political forces. However, whenever ceasefire was brought into action in a specific area or district in Beirut or elsewhere in the country, the LAF would straight away enforce peace. On May 13, the national army announced that if the clashes would not end as soon as possible, it would have to intervene and use force if necessary to stop them.

=== 2011–2017 Syrian Civil War spillover in Lebanon ===
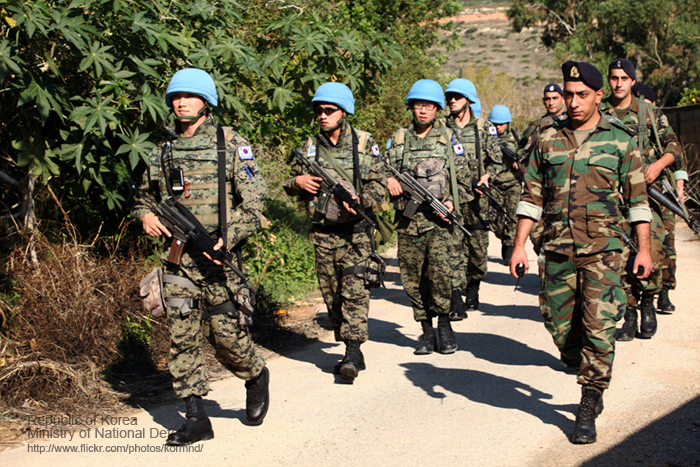
A joint patrol by the Lebanese Army and South Korean troops serving with UNIFIL in 2011

Since the outbreak of conflict in Syria, the Lebanese Army has been deployed to prevent clashes from taking place in the city of Tripoli, as well as in other hot zones such as Beirut and Arsal on the eastern borders. In 2014, ISIS and Al-Nusra Front established small bases and fortifications in the Anti-Lebanon Mountains, where they operated against Hezbollah and the Lebanese Army.

On June 23, 2013, intense clashes in Sidon took place between followers of Salafist Sunni preacher Ahmad Al-Assir and Lebanese troops. Following these clashes, the Lebanese Army was sent in to capture Sheikh Assir's headquarters at Abra and apprehend him. Lebanese Army units fought against pro-Assir militants for two days in a battle that left at least 16 Lebanese soldiers dead and at least 50 wounded. Although the LAF managed to secure his complex, Assir was able to escape and was only captured on August 16, 2015, while trying to flee the country on a false passport.

On August 2, 2014, following the arrest of an Al-Nusra Front commander Abu Ahmad Jumaa, militants from Al-Nusra and ISIS launched an assault on the LAF in Arsal and seized control of the town. By August 7, a fragile truce was established as ISIS and Al Nusra forces also retreated from the town and redeployed along the border with Syria. Their hideouts there were subsequently bombed by the Syrian Air Force. Two days later, the Lebanese Army entered Arsal in full force and reestablished control over checkpoints that the militants had previously seized.

On July 21, 2017, Hezbollah, the Syrian Armed Forces and the Lebanese Army launched a military operation against ISIS and Hay'at Tahrir al-Sham positions on the Lebanon–Syria border. The Lebanese army committed the 5th and 7th Infantry Brigades to the battle, and heavily shelled ISIS and HTS positions. By August 28, most of the around 2,100 militants surrendered to Hezbollah and the Syrian Army.

In December 2024, following the lightning offensive in Syria by HTS that overthrew the regime of Bashar al-Assad, the LAF sealed the Lebanon–Syria border.

=== 2024 Lebanon War ===
On 1 October 2024, Israel invaded Lebanon as part of the 2024 Lebanon War. The Lebanese Armed Forces did not enter in direct combat against Israel Defense Forces, instead retreating to about five kilometres from Lebanon's southern border with Israel. On December 3, 2024, It was announced that the army will start recruitment for new soldiers for combat units. The process will continue up until January 3, 2025. On December 8, 2024 it was reported that the Lebanese Cabinet approved deployment of forces south of the Litani river. On January 7, 2025 units of the Lebanese army began to deploy in Southern Lebanon, following the withdrawal of Israeli troops from Ras Naqoura, Aalma ash-Shaab, Tayr Harfa in Tyre, Beit Lif in Bint Jbeil, and other towns across the western and central sectors. This comes as part of coordinated efforts with the United Nations Interim Force in Lebanon (UNIFIL) and the committee supervising the ceasefire agreement mechanism.

== See also ==
- Internal Security Forces
- General Security Directorate (Lebanon)
- State Security
- Rangers of the Lebanese Army Sports Event
- Tomb of the Unknown Soldier (Lebanon)
- United Nations Interim Force in Lebanon
- List of extrajudicial killings and political violence in Lebanon
- Hezbollah armed strength
- Rodolphe Haykal
