= Emile Lahoud Jr. =

Lebanese politician and businessman (born 1975)

Emile Lahoud
- Born: Emile Emile Lahoud; 21 January 1975 (age 51); Baabdat, Matn, Lebanon
- Education: International College, Beirut; Lebanese American University
- Occupations: Politician; businessman
- Years active: 2000–present
- Spouse: Sabine Tambourgi (m. 2002)
- Children: 3
- Father: Émile Lahoud
- Relatives: Jamil Lahoud (grandfather); others, see Lahoud
- Website: www.emilelahoud.org

Emile Emile Lahoud (born 21 January 1975), more commonly known as Emile Lahoud Jr., is a Lebanese politician, businessman, and former swimmer.

== Early life and education ==
Emile Lahoud Jr. was born in the Matn District town of Baabdat on 21 January 1975. He is the eldest son of former Lebanese President Émile Lahoud and his wife Andrée Amadouni.

Lahoud completed secondary education at International College in Beirut. He then enrolled at Notre Dame University (NDU). However, he transferred to the Lebanese American University (LAU) in 1993 where he obtained a Bachelor of Science degree in business marketing in 1997. Next, he began to study politics, international relations, economics, and social affairs at the graduate program of International Affairs at LAU. He received a master's degree there in 1999.

== Career ==
Lahoud was elected as the deputy of Matn in August 2000 in the general elections. He was part of the list headed by then minister of interior Michel Murr, and his election campaign was managed by Elias Murr. This caused the protests by rival candidates led by then Lebanon President Emile Lahoud's first cousin, Nassib Lahoud. In 2000, he attended a memorial service for the late President-elect Bashir Gemayel. His participation in the ceremony was reported to make upset Syrian authorities. Emile Lahoud Jr. did not take part in the 2005 general elections.

Lahoud founded L and R Communications, a media company, in 1999. The company was extended to Jordan, Saudi Arabia and Syria in 2006. It is argued that he monopolized the advertising market.

== Personal life ==
Lahoud married Sabine Tambourgi, daughter of Gilbert Tambourgi, in September 2002. He has three children, Emile, Emma and Maher. He is a former swimmer and participated in 1988 and 1992 Summer Olympic Games.
