= Lahoud =

Lahoud (Arabic: لحود; Classical Syriac: ܠܚܽܘܕ), also spelled LaHood in the United States or Lajud in Latin America, is a Maronite Lebanese family name. The name etymologically derives from the Aramaic "ܠܚܽܘܕܳܝܳܐ", meaning "one who stands alone," historically in reference to Jesus. Members of this family have been prominent in Lebanese politics.

A part of the Daou families, Arabs have claimed they allegedly trace their origin back to Ghassanids.

== Politicians ==
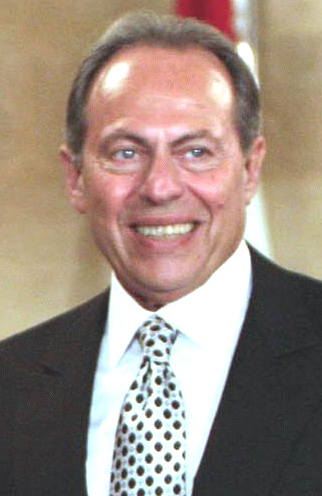
President Emile Lahoud

- Jamil Lahoud (1901–1983), general in the Lebanese Army and former minister and MP, father of president Emile Lahoud
- Salim Lahoud (1910–1971), former Minister and MP of Metn District, brother of Fouad Lahoud
- Fouad Lahoud, (1912–1987), Lebanese Army officer and MP of Metn district between 1972 until his death, brother of Salim Lahoud
- Émile Lahoud (b. 1936), president of Lebanon from 1998 to 2007
- Nassib Lahoud (1944–2012), Lebanese politician, son of Salim
- Emile Lahoud Jr. (b. 1975), Lebanese politician, son of president Emile Lahoud

== Other ==
- Romeo Lahoud (b. 1931), Lebanese director of musicals
- Joe Lahoud (b. 1947), American baseball player
- Marwan Lahoud (b. 1966), French engineer born in Lebanon
- Imad Lahoud (b. 1967), brother of Marwan Lahoud
- Aline Lahoud (b. 1986), Lebanese singer
- Michael Lahoud (b. 1986), Sierra Leonian footballer
- Gibrán Lajud (b. 1993), Mexican footballer
- Daniel Lajud (b. 1999), Mexican-Lebanese footballer

== See also ==
- Nehme, another Lebanese family who shares the same Daou ancestry
