= Labaki =

Labaki (in Arabic لبكي) is an Arabic surname. Notable persons with that surname include:

- Carmen Labaki (born 1971), Lebanese–Brazilian film and television director and producer
- Nadine Labaki (born 1974), Lebanese film director and actress
- Salah Labaki (1906–1955), Lebanese poet
- Yolande Labaki (born 1927), Lebanese artist
- Henri Labaki (born 1970), Lebanese philanthropist
