= Amy Carter (politician) =

American politician (born 1970)

Member of the Georgia House of Representatives from the 175th district
- In office January 2007 – December 31, 2017
- Succeeded by: John LaHood

Personal details
- Born: March 14, 1970 (age 56) Valdosta, Georgia
- Party: Republican (2010-present), Democratic (before 2010)
- Education: Valdosta State University
- Profession: educator
- Committees: Agriculture & Consumer Affairs, Education, Higher Education, Appropriations (General Government Subcommittee Chair), Governmental Affairs, Small Business Development

Amy Carter (born March 14, 1970) is an American politician who is a former Democratic-turned-Republican member of the Georgia House of Representatives, representing the 175th district from 2007 until her resignation on December 31, 2017, to become executive director of Advancement at the Technical College System of Georgia. Her district includes Brooks County and parts of Lowndes County and Thomas County, Georgia.

Despite also being from South Georgia, Carter bears no close relation to the late President Jimmy Carter, who has a daughter of the same name. Her legislative district is about 120 miles (190 km) south of President Carter's hometown of Plains.

== See also ==
- List of state government committees (Georgia)
