= 16th Summit of the Non-Aligned Movement =

2012 Tehran summit conference

Coordinates: 35°47′42.94″N 51°24′12.39″E

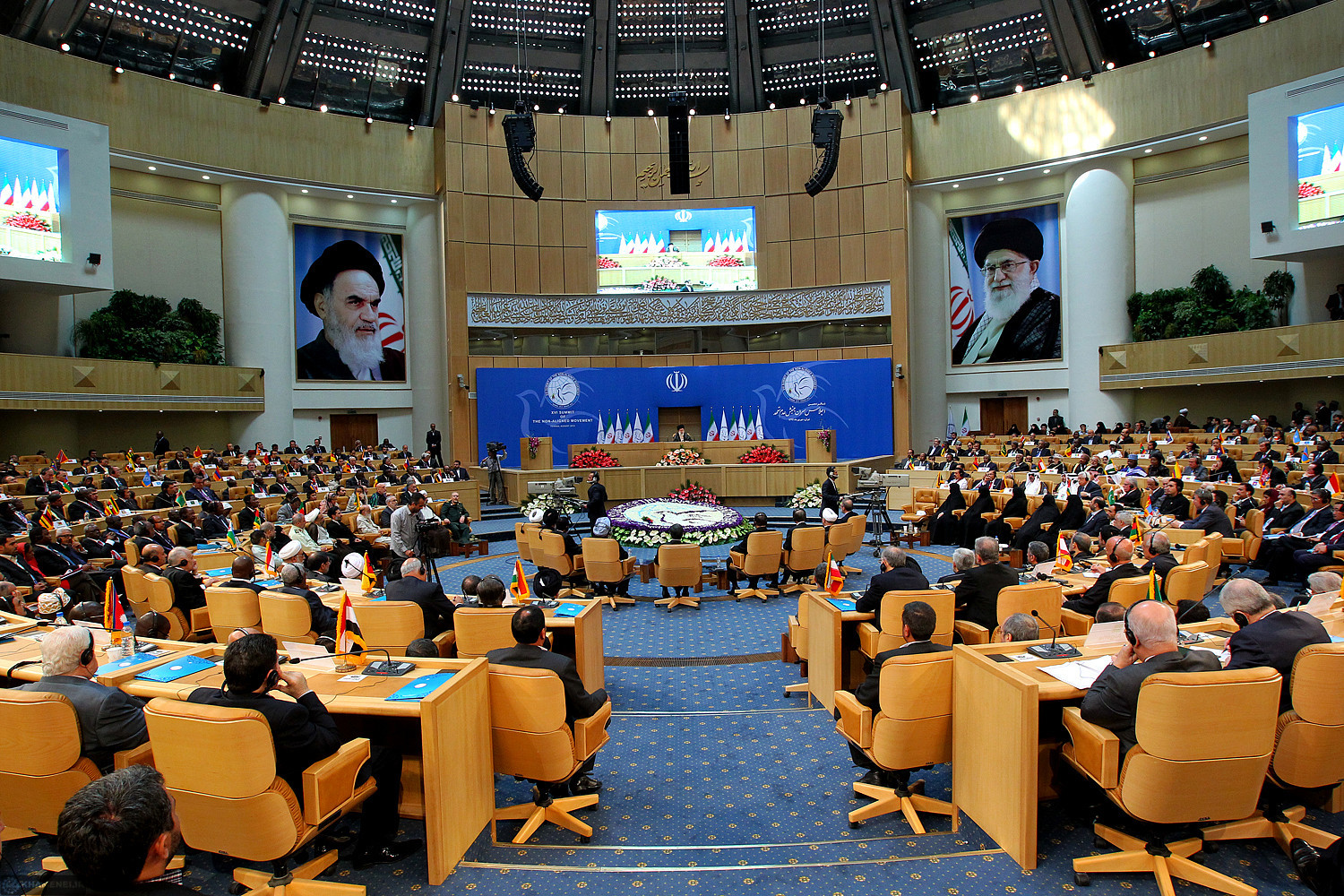
- The 16th Summit of the Non-Aligned Movement
- Host country: Iran
- Dates: 26–31 August 2012
- Motto: Lasting peace through joint global governance
- Cities: Tehran
- Website: www.nam.gov.ir

The 16th Summit of the Non-Aligned Movement was held from 26 to 31 August 2012 in Tehran, Iran. The summit was attended by leaders of 120 countries, including 24 presidents, 3 kings, 8 prime ministers and 50 foreign ministers.

The summit's framework was the "Final Document" adopted during the Ministerial Meeting of the Non-Aligned Movement Coordinating Bureau which was held in Sharm el-Sheikh, Egypt, from 7 to 10 May. The Foreign Ministry also said that the agenda would primarily consist of issues pertaining to nuclear disarmament, human rights and regional issues. Iran also intended to draw up a new peace resolution aiming to resolve the Syrian civil war.

The summit consisted of two preceding events: a "Senior Officials Meeting" on 26 and 27 August 2012, and a "Ministerial Meeting" on 28 and 29 August 2012. The leaders summit took place on 30 and 31 August. Egyptian President Mohammad Morsi officially handed the presidency of the Non-Aligned Movement (NAM) to Iranian President Mahmoud Ahmadinejad, during the inaugural ceremony of Leaders' Meeting. Iran will hold the NAM presidency for four years until the 17th summit in Venezuela in 2016.

== Officials ==
| Mahmoud Ahmadinejad | Chairman of the 16th session |
| MohammadAli Zohreei | Deputy Secretary, Finance and Conference Support |
| Mohammad sheikhan | Deputy of communications and information of the organizing headquarters |
| Babak Mohammadkhani | Responsible for communications and special follow-ups of the holding headquarters |
| Mohammad Javad Aghajari | The head of the foreign media committee of the vice president of communications of the holding headquarters |
| Mohammad Reza Furqani | Spokesperson of the organizing committee |
| Mustafa Senjari | Graphic designer - Summit logo designer |
| Ali Saeedlou | Head of the holding staff |

== Overview ==
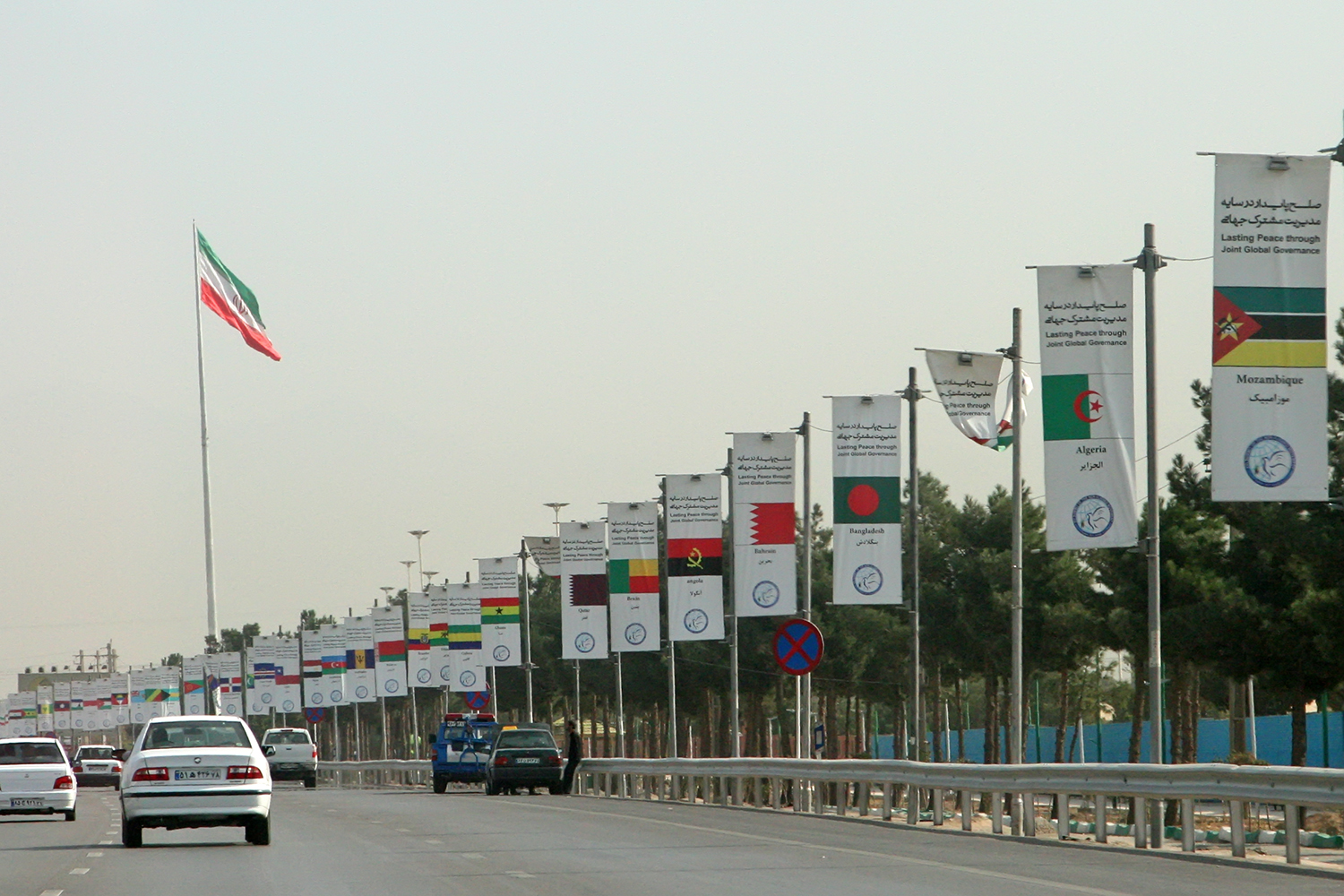
Flags of countries in attendance along with the motto put up for the summit in Tehran

As of August 2012, the organisation consists of 120 member states, including the non-UN member state of Palestine, and 21 other observer countries. The countries of the Non-Aligned Movement represent nearly two-thirds of the United Nations' members and contain 55% of the world's population.

Since the Non-Aligned Movement was formed in an attempt not to take sides during the Cold War, it has sought to seek a new direction since the fall of the Soviet Union. After the breakup of Yugoslavia, a founding member, its membership was suspended in 1992 at the regular ministerial meeting held in New York during the regular annual session of the United Nations General Assembly.

== Organization ==
The summit was scheduled to be held at Kish Island but it was transferred to Tehran in 2010. According to Vice President Ali Saeedlou, who is the head of the organising committee, up to 7,000 participants – including delegations and the media – are expected to attend the summit. To prepare for the meeting and reduce traffic and air pollution, a five-day public holiday in Tehran has been called for the duration of the summit. Parts of Tehran have been beautified with lamp posts and freshly painted road markings. Roads around the summit venue will be closed to all but official vehicles. Iran's deputy police chief Ahmad Reza Radan stated "The police are on full alert during the Non-Aligned Movement summit." In addition, to raise security of the event, visa-free entry to Iran normally offered to nationals from several countries has been temporarily suspended.

The "Senior Officials Meeting" and "Ministerial Meeting" convened at the "IRIB International Conference Center" (IICC). The summit was held at "Tehran's Summit Conference Hall".

== Participants ==
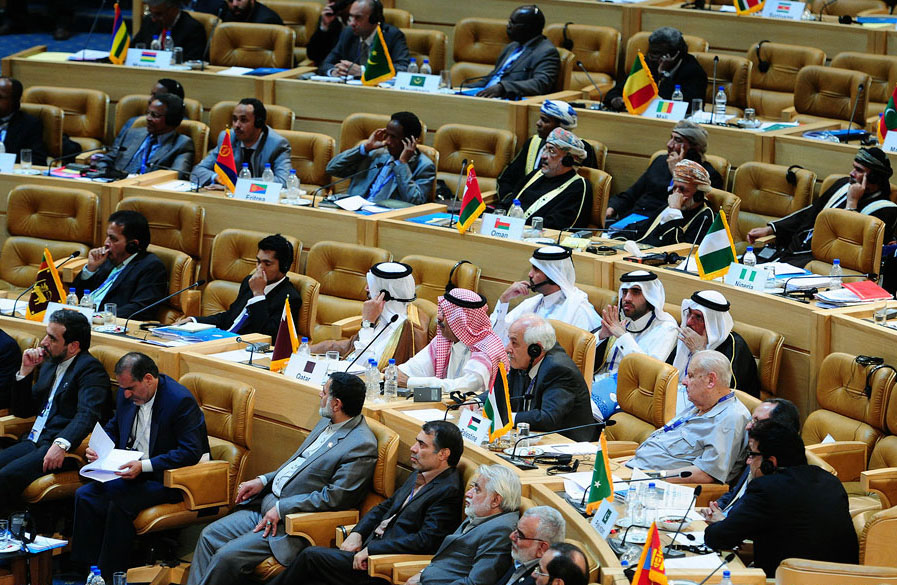
Closing ceremony of the Non-Aligned Movement (NAM) summit with the presence of members' heads of state

A spokesman of the Iranian Ministry of Foreign Affairs stated that 24 presidents, 3 kings, 8 vice presidents, 8 prime ministers, 50 foreign ministers attended at the summit. By the first day of the summit, 110 delegations arrived Tehran.

Ali Akbar Salehi, Minister of Foreign Affairs of Iran, announced that the UN Secretary-General, Ban Ki-moon, would attend the conference. He also invited leaders of Russia, Turkey and Brazil to the summit. Mohamed Morsi, ex-president of NAM and the Egyptian President, also announced that he would participate in the summit. He was the first leader of his country to visit Iran since the Islamic revolution.

Iran reportedly cancelled an invitation to Saudi Arabia to attend the summit. However, it was later announced that Abdulaziz bin Abdullah, Saudi Deputy Foreign Minister, would participate in the summit upon the invitation of Saudi Arabia.

NAM members; Host country and leader are indicated in bold text
| Member | | Represented by | Title |
|---|---|---|---|
| (Islamic Republic of Afghanistan) | Afghanistan | Hamid Karzai | President |
| (Algeria) | Algeria | Mourad Medelci | Foreign Minister |
| (Azerbaijan) | Azerbaijan | Elmar Mammadyarov | Foreign Minister |
| (Bahrain) | Bahrain | Khalid bin Ahmed Al Khalifa | Foreign Minister |
| (Bangladesh) | Bangladesh | Sheikh Hasina | Prime Minister |
| (Belarus) | Belarus | Vladimir Makei | Foreign Minister |
| (Benin) | Benin | Yayi Boni | President |
| (Bhutan) | Bhutan | Jigme Thinley | Prime Minister |
| (Bolivia) | Bolivia | Álvaro García Linera | Vice President |
| (Brunei) | Brunei Darussalam | Pengiran Muda Mohamed Bolkiah | Minister of Foreign Affairs and Trade |
| (Burkina Faso) | Burkina Faso | Blaise Compaoré | President |
| (Cambodia) | Cambodia | Hun Sen | Prime Minister |
| (Central African Republic) | Central African Republic | François Bozizé | President |
| (Colombia) | Colombia | Angelino Garzón | Vice President |
| (Comoros) | Comoros | Nourdine Bourhane | Vice President |
| (Chile) | Chile | Alfredo Moreno | Foreign Minister |
| (Cuba) | Cuba | Jose Ramon Machado | Vice President |
| (Djibouti) | Djibouti | Ismail Omar Guelleh | President |
| (Ecuador) | Ecuador | Lenín Moreno | Vice President |
| (Egypt) | Egypt | Mohamed Morsi | President |
| (Gabon) | Gabon | Ali Bongo Ondimba | President |
| (Ghana) | Ghana | Muhammad Mumuni | Foreign Minister |
| (Guinea-Bissau) | Guinea-Bissau | Manuel Serifo Nhamadjo | President |
| (Jordan) | Jordan | Hassan bin Talal | Deputy Prime Minister |
| (India) | India | Manmohan Singh | Prime Minister |
| (Iran) | Iran | Mahmoud Ahmadinejad (host) | President |
| (Iraq) | Iraq | Nouri al-Maliki | Prime Minister |
| (Indonesia) | Indonesia | Boediono | Vice President |
| (Kazakhstan) | Kazakhstan | Yerzhan Kazykhanov | Foreign Minister |
| (Kuwait) | Kuwait | Muhammad Sabah | Deputy Prime Minister |
| (Lebanon) | Lebanon | Michel Suleiman | President |
| (Lesotho) | Lesotho | Mohlabi Tsekoa | Foreign Minister |
| (Libya) | Libya | Ashour Bin Khayal | Foreign Minister |
| (Malaysia) | Malaysia | Anifah Aman | Foreign Minister |
| (Mali) | Mali | Tiéman Coulibaly | Foreign Minister |
| (Mauritania) | Mauritania | Mohamed Ould Abdel Aziz | President |
| (Mauritius) | Mauritius | Arvin Boolell | Foreign Minister |
| (Mongolia) | Mongolia | Tsakhiagiin Elbegdorj | President |
| (Morocco) | Morocco | Abdelillah Benkirane | Prime Minister |
| (Mozambique) | Mozambique | Arlete Matola | Minister of the Presidential Office |
| (Myanmar) | Myanmar | Wunna Maung Lwin | Foreign Minister |
| (Namibia) | Namibia | Marco Hausiku | Foreign Minister |
| (Nepal) | Nepal | Baburam Bhattarai | Prime Minister |
| (Nicaragua) | Nicaragua | Samuel Santos López | Foreign Minister |
| (Nigeria) | Nigeria | Namadi Sambo | Vice president |
| (North Korea) | Korea, Democratic People's Republic of | Kim Yong-nam | President |
| (Pakistan) | Pakistan | Asif Ali Zardari | President |
| (Palestine) | Palestine | Mahmoud Abbas | President |
| (Philippines) | Philippines | Jejomar Binay | Vice President |
| (Oman) | Oman | Yusuf bin Alawi bin Abdullah | Foreign Minister |
| (Qatar) | Qatar | Hamad bin Khalifa Al Thani | Emir |
| (Saudi Arabia) | Saudi Arabia | Abdulaziz bin Abdullah Al Saud | Deputy Foreign Minister |
| (Senegal) | Senegal | Macky Sall | President |
| (Singapore) | Singapore | Kasiviswanathan Shanmugam | Foreign Minister |
| (South Africa) | South Africa | Maite Nkoana-Mashabane | Foreign Minister |
| (Sri Lanka) | Sri Lanka | Mahinda Rajapaksa | President |
| (Sudan) | Sudan | Omar al-Bashir | President |
| (Eswatini) | Swaziland | Lutfo Dlamini | Foreign Minister |
| (Syria) | Syria | Wael Nader al-Halqi | Prime Minister |
| (Tanzania) | Tanzania | Mohamed Gharib Bilal | Vice President |
| (Thailand) | Thailand | Surapong Tovichakchaikul | Foreign Minister |
| (Tunisia) | Tunisia | Rafik Abdessalem | Foreign Minister |
| (Turkmenistan) | Turkmenistan | Gurbanguly Berdimuhamedow | President |
| (Uganda) | Uganda | Yoweri Museveni | President |
| (United Arab Emirates) | United Arab Emirates | Saud bin Rashid | Vice President |
| (Venezuela) | Venezuela | Elías Jaua | Vice President |
| (Vietnam) | Vietnam | Nguyen Tan Dung | Prime Minister |
| (Zambia) | Zambia | Guy Scott | Vice President |
| (Zimbabwe) | Zimbabwe | Robert Mugabe | President |
Observers
| Nation | | Represented by | Title |
| (Armenia) | Armenia | Eduard Nalbandyan | Foreign Minister |
| (Bosnia and Herzegovina) | Bosnia and Herzegovina | Željko Jerkić | Ambassador and Department Head (Foreign Ministry) |
| (Brazil) | Brazil | Michel Temer | Vice President |
| (China) | China | Zhang Zhijun | Deputy Foreign Minister |
| (Croatia) | Croatia | Budimir Lončar | Advisor to the President |
| (Montenegro) | Montenegro | Zoran Janković | General Director (Foreign Ministry) |
| (Serbia) | Serbia | Ivan Mrkić | Foreign Minister |
| (Tajikistan) | Tajikistan | Emomali Rahmonov | President |
Invited nations (Guests)
| Nation | | Represented by | Title |
| (Australia) | Australia | Gary Quinlan | U.N. Ambassador of Australia |
| (El Salvador) | El Salvador | Felix Ulloa | Vice President |
| (Kyrgyzstan) | Kyrgyzstan | Sooronbay Jeenbekov | Governor of the Osh region |
| (Mexico) | Mexico | | |
| (Russia) | Russian Federation | Dmitry Kozak | Deputy Prime Minister |
| (Sahrawi Arab Democratic Republic) | Sahrawi Arab Democratic Republic | Mohamed Yeslem Beisat | Ambassador |
| (South Korea) | South Korea | | |
| (Switzerland) | Switzerland | Wolfgang Amadeus Bruelhart | Director of the Middle East |
| (Turkey) | Turkey | Cevdet Yılmaz | Development Minister |
| (Uruguay) | Uruguay | Tabare Vazquez | Vice President |
Observer organisations
| Organization | | Represented by | Title |
| | African Union | Yayi Boni | Chairperson |
| (Arab League) | Arab League | Nabil el-Araby | Secretary General |
| (Organisation of Islamic Cooperation) | OIC | Ekmeleddin İhsanoğlu | Secretary General |
| (United Nations) | United Nations | Ban Ki-moon | Secretary-General |
| (United Nations) | United Nations General Assembly | Nassir Abdulaziz Al-Nasser | President |
| | Group of 77 | Mourad Benmehidi | Chairman |

== Pre-summit responses ==
Former Malaysian Prime Minister Mahathir Mohamad commented on the significance of the summit in Iran: "Certain NAM states too have upheld sanctions against Iran which is a totally unwise move because the sanctions are not on part of the UN, rather unilaterally levelled by the US The U.S. can issue any sort of sanctions it wants against Iran but there is no reason other countries to follow suit."

An Iranian government official also commented on the summit, reportedly saying that "the NAM summit is the best opportunity to confront the sanctions." He added that "in meetings with the officials of [fellow] member states, we should brief them on the illegality of these sanctions and talk to them to make these sanctions ineffective."

== Agenda ==
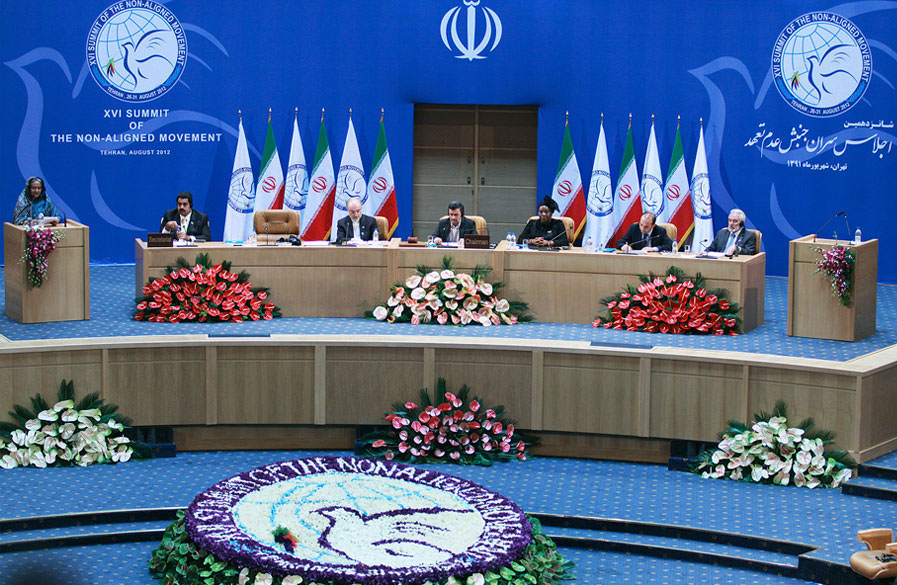
Last day of the conference

The base of the summit's negotiations' framework is the "Final Document" adopted during the Ministerial Meeting of the Non-Aligned Movement Coordinating Bureau which was held in Sharm el-Sheikh, Egypt, from 7 to 10 May 2012.

The Foreign Ministry also said that the agenda would primarily consist of issues pertaining to nuclear disarmament, human rights and regional issues. Iran also intended to draw up a new peace resolution aiming to resolve the Syrian civil war.

Foreign Minister Ali Akbar Salehi opened the first meeting and spoke of NAM's original goal: "We believe that the timetable for ultimate removal of nuclear weapons by 2025, which was proposed by NAM, will only be realised if we follow it up decisively." At the opening of the ministerial meeting Khamenei said: "The UN Security Council has an irrational, unjust and utterly undemocratic structure, and this is an overt dictatorship. The control room of the world (the Security Council) is under the control of the dictatorship of some Western countries." Al Jazeera interpreted Moon's reaction as "nonplussed."

=== Senior Officials Meeting ===
The Senior Officials Meeting was held on 26 and 27 August 2012. The officials reviewed the Sharm el-Sheikh's document and issued a draft document which should be endorsed by the ministerial meetings. Iran's deputy foreign minister, Mohammad Mehdi Akhondzadeh, who is also secretary general of the senior officials meeting, read parts of the draft document at the press conference and mentioned some of the main points including rejection of all forms of terrorism, as well as all form of occupation including occupation of the Palestinian territories by Israel, requesting weapons of mass destruction and nuclear weapon disarmament, condemning unilateral sanctions and replacing unipolar management of international politics with collective management. According to Akhundzadeh, the draft urges for a Middle East free from nuclear weapons and emphasizes "inalienable" right of all NAM member states for the peaceful use of nuclear energy, envisaged by the Nuclear Non-Proliferation Treaty (NPT).

=== Ministerial Meeting ===
The Ministerial Meeting with presence of foreign ministers of NAM countries was held on 28 and 29 August 2012. Egypt's Deputy Foreign Minister, Ramzy Ezzeldin Ramzy, handed the presidency of the ministerial meeting for three years at the opening ceremony of the meeting. After opening remark of Ali Akbar Salehi and listening to the report of Senior Officials Meeting which was delivered by Mohammad Mehdi Akhondzadeh, the ministers starts to review the document. After preparation of the final document for the leaders' summit, Ali Akbar Salehi participated in a press conference and emphasized on the four main topics that were discussed at the meeting including establishment a task force in New York to pursue Palestine's membership in the United Nations and act against Israel's "illegal" measures against Palestinians, finding solution for Syrian crisis with United Nations cooperation, acting against monopolizing of the financial mechanisms in the world by using US dollar and finally establishment of a work group in New York to study the mechanisms of plural management of the world.

=== Leaders' Summit ===
On 30 August, the summit was inaugurated by Iran's Supreme Leader, Ayatollah Ali Khamenei. Then the Egyptian President, Mohammad Morsi, as the chair of the 15th summit declared opening of the 16th summit and presented the report of NAM's chairmanship during the past three years. Morsi officially handed the presidency of the Non-Aligned Movement to the Iranian President, Mahmoud Ahmadinejad. After Morsi, President of the Sixty-sixth session of the United Nations General Assembly Nassir Abdulaziz Al-Nasser, Secretary-General Ban Ki-moon, Chair of the Group of 77 Mourad Benmehidi, host President Mahmoud Ahmadinejad and Indian Prime Minister Manmohan Singh delivered their opening speeches. Khamenei later commented that "the Non-Aligned Movement definitely has more political right than the US, NATO or some European countries to intervene in the Syrian issue," but "did not elaborate on what kind of role the group should have".

Inaugurating the summit, Iranian Supreme Leader Khamenei condemned the use of nuclear and chemical weapons as an "unforgivable sin", and called for "Middle East Free from Nuclear Weapons". Khamenei argued that it was ironic for the US to oppose nuclear proliferation while, according to Khamenei, it possessed the largest stockpile of nuclear weapons and had used them in the past. He also accused the US and its Western allies of providing "the usurper Zionist regime" with nuclear weapons. A day after U.N. Secretary-General Ban Ki-moon asked Khamenei to lower his rhetoric on Israel, Khamanei accused "the Zionist regime" of "waging disastrous wars" and "organizing state terror" throughout the world, and said the media that it and the West own repeat the "lie" that the Palestinians are "terrorists." He criticized the UN Security Council as "unjust" and "undemocratic" and accused the US of abusing it. Other Iranian officials stated that the Security Council had more power than the General Assembly and criticized the veto rights of its permanent members. Khamenei accused the United States of protecting the interests of the Western countries in the name of "human rights", interfering militarily in other countries in the name of "democracy", and targeting civilians in the name of "combating terrorism." Khamenei also proposed improving the "political productivity" of the Non-Aligned Movement in global governance and called for a "historic document", an active secretariat, and administrative tools to achieve this. He also called for economic cooperation and for cultural relationships between NAM members.

Following Khamenei's remarks, the United Nations Secretary-General Ban Ki-moon, who was described as visibly irritated, denounced Iran's position towards Israel in his opening speech. "I strongly reject threats by any member state to destroy another or outrageous attempts to deny historical facts, such as the Holocaust," he said. "Claiming that another UN Member State, Israel, does not have the right to exist, or describing it in racist terms, is not only utterly wrong but undermines the very principles we have all pledged to uphold." While describing Iran's cooperation with the International Atomic Energy Agency as "constructive and useful," Ban Ki-moon demanded that Iran boost global confidence in its nuclear program by "fully complying with the relevant (UN) Security Council resolutions and thoroughly cooperating with the IAEA." Ahmadinejad also declares a one minute of silence in honor of the late Iranian president and prime minister, Mohammad-Ali Rajai and Mohammad-Javad Bahonar that were assassinated in same day in 1981.

Egyptian President Mohamed Morsi denounced the Syrian government, an ally of Iran, calling it "oppressive" and said that it was an "ethical duty" to support the Syrian revolt against the Bashar al-Assad government. Walid al-Moallem, Syrian foreign minister, walked out in protest, although Mahmoud Ahmadinejad remained seated beside Morsi. Morsi called for a peaceful transition to freedom and democracy in Syria. Like Iran, Morsi also called for reform in the structure of the UN Security Council. Morsi echoed Iranian calls for a nuclear-free Middle East, and criticized Israel for refusing to join the Non-Proliferation Treaty. Morsi and Iran also both supported the Palestinian bid for a seat at the UN. At the summit Egypt's Mohammed Morsi also handed over the leadership of the body to Iran for the next three years.

Indian Prime Minister, Manmohan Singh, called for a peaceful resolution of the crisis in Syria and pledged support for the Palestinian movement. He also called for reform in the UN Security Council, the World Bank and the International Monetary Fund. The summit also drew up a draft resolution on ending the Syrian conflict.

The summit's final declaration ratified on 31 August by the 120 members of NAM, emphasizes on the right of all countries to develop and use of nuclear energy for peaceful purposes and notably singles out Iran. In addition, it condemns unilateral sanctions, supports creation of a Palestinian state, advocates nuclear disarmament, human rights free from political agendas and opposition to racism and "Islamophobia". But due to lack of consensus among member states it did not mention to Syria's civil war.

At the end of the summit, Venezuela was declared as the host of the 17th summit with the consensus of the member states.

=== Bilateral meetings ===
Pakistani President Asif Ali Zardari and Indian Prime Minister Manmohan Singh are likely to meet on the margins of the summit to discuss recent developments in India–Pakistan relations and in the region. UN Secretary-General Ban Ki-moon intends to talk with the Iranian leaders about issues such as Iran's nuclear programme, terrorism, human rights and the crisis in Syria.

India, Iran and Afghanistan agreed to set up a joint working group to discuss the development of the strategically important Chahbahar port in Iran.

At two separate meetings with Iran's Supreme Leader Ali Khamenei and President Mahmoud Ahmadinejad, spokesman Martin Nesirky said that United Nations Secretary-General Ban Ki-moon called for a stop to their threats against Israel, and said that "their verbal attacks on Israel were offensive, inflammatory, and unacceptable." Ban also said that Iran needed to take "concrete steps to address the concerns of the International Atomic Energy Agency and prove to the world its nuclear program is for peaceful purposes." He further urged Iran to use its influence to help end the Syrian Civil War. Human rights were also discussed.

In addition, United Nations Secretary-General Ban Ki-moon criticised Iran for alleged "serious concerns on the human rights abuses and violation[s]" and urged Iran to cooperate with the United Nations to improve its human rights record. Iranian Parliament Speaker Ali Larijani, who sat next to Ban, was reported by Yedioth Ahronoth as having frowned at the remarks. He also met Syria's PM Wael al-Halaqi and Foreign Minister Walid Muallem and later told a news conference about the meeting that in regards to the violence "the primary responsibility resting on the government to halt its use of heavy weapons. [He] demands for all sides to cease all forms of violence. What is important at this time is that all the parties must stop the violence. All those actors who may be providing arms to both sides...must stop." He further mentioned that he had called on Iran to support his call "and I have a strong assurance from Iran that it will do so." He also met the new UN-Arab League envoy Lakhdar Brahimi.

== Reactions and assessments ==
Agence France-Presse claimed that Ban Ki-moon's attacks on Iran and Morsi's support for the Syrian opposition upset Iran's goal of showing the summit as a diplomatic victory for Iran against Western attempts to isolate Iran. A Xinhua commentary qualified the summit as an "important" diplomatic "accomplishment from Iran", having hosted "leaders and delegates of over 100 countries". The Anti-Defamation League slammed what they called the hate speech of Ayatollah Khamanei's opening remarks, in which he rejected Israel's legitimacy, accused "ferocious Zionist wolves" of committing daily acts of murder around the world, and perpetuated an old anti-Semitic myth of a "Zionist-controlled" media.

== Other events ==
In an effort for Iran to prove that its nuclear programme is peaceful, the Foreign Ministry of Iran declared that Iran would arrange for officials from the Non-Aligned Movement to visit its nuclear facilities. In addition, the mangled remains of three cars in which Iranian nuclear scientists were assassinated stands outside of the event venue, as part of an Iranian campaign to demonstrate that Iran has been a victim of terrorism, which Iran has accused the West as being responsible for.

The Cultural Heritage, Handcrafts and Tourism Organization announced an opportunity for visiting delegations to make a visit to the exhibition of Persian handicrafts held at Tehran's Milad Tower. Visiting nationals from the NAM countries could avail of a tour of Tehran's historic museums, palaces and ancient sites in order to get acquainted with Persian culture and civilisation.

== Controversies ==
=== Attendance of Ban Ki-moon ===
While it is usual for the UN Secretary-General to attend NAM Summits, the presence of Ban Ki-moon was opposed by the United States and Israel. Haaretz reported that Prime Minister of Israel Benjamin Netanyahu had personally appealed to the secretary-general not to attend this summit and described Iran as "a regime that represents the greatest danger to world peace". In addition, according to Maariv, the Israeli Foreign Ministry ordered Israel's embassies to encourage their host countries not to attend or to send only lower-level representatives to the summit.

The government of the United States also publicly expressed displeasure over world leaders attending the summit. U.S. State Department spokesperson Victoria Nuland said: "We think that this is a strange place and an inappropriate place for this meeting. We have made that point to participating countries. We've also made that point to [the UN] Secretary General Ban Ki-moon. If he does choose to go, we hope he will make the strongest points of concern." Haaretz reported that both the United States and Israel believed that such a visit would break their efforts to isolate Iran from the international community by giving the country a "renewed international legitimacy."

Although the US and Israel had urged Ban to boycott the summit, UN spokesman Martin Nesirky confirmed that Ban would attend the summit. He hoped to meet with Supreme Leader of Iran Ali Khamenei and President Mahmoud Ahmadenijad at the sidelines of the summit to have "meaningful and fruitful discussions" and to "convey the international community's expectations that Iran make urgent progress on issues including the country's controversial nuclear program, terrorism, human rights and the crisis in Syria."

Still, Ban Ki-moon signalled that he would not refrain from criticizing Iran at the summit. At the summit, harsh criticism of Iran's human rights record was levelled by Ban, which caught Iranian officials off guard. Ban criticised Iran in calling the country to "...demonstrate that it can play a moderate and constructive role internationally, [which] includes responsible action on the nuclear program" and "for the sake of peace and security in this region and globally, [urged] Iran to take the necessary measures to build international confidence in the exclusively peaceful nature of its nuclear programme." Iranian opposition groups urged Ban Ki-moon to use his attendance at the summit as a way to criticize the Iranian government over its crackdowns on political dissent, such as the house arrest of opposition leaders Mir Hossein Mousavi and Mahdi Karroubi.

=== Fatah–Hamas rivalry ===
In late August, President Mahmoud Ahmadinejad invited Hamas Prime Minister Ismail Haniyeh to the summit, despite Fatah leader Mahmoud Abbas' attendance being contingent on Abbas serving as the sole representative of the Palestinians at the summit, Haniyeh's office said that he would attend the summit, sparking a counter-protest. Fatah's Prime Minister Salam Fayyad condemned the invitation, accused Iran of being "against Palestinian national unity" and said that only his party's representatives were the "sole and legitimate representative" of the Palestinians. Their Foreign Affairs Minister Riyad al-Maliki said that if Haniyeh attends the conference Abbas would not attend and reiterated the stance that it was the only "legitimate Palestinian representative." The Palestine Liberation Organization also condemned the invitation, saying that "Iran joined the Israeli choir which aims to undermine the Palestinian political system and its elected legitimacies."

However, on 26 August, news agencies Mehr and ISNA said that it had not invited Haniyeh. Mohammad Reza Forqani, the spokesman for the summit, said: "Only [Palestinian President] Mahmoud Abbas has been invited to the NAM summit."

Taher al-Nono, a Hamas spokesman, appropriating Ahmadinejad told this invitation shows Iran's support of Palestine but Haniyeh excused and refrain for attendance in the summit to not intensify disagreements and divides of Palestinians, Arabs and Muslims.

=== Error in translations ===
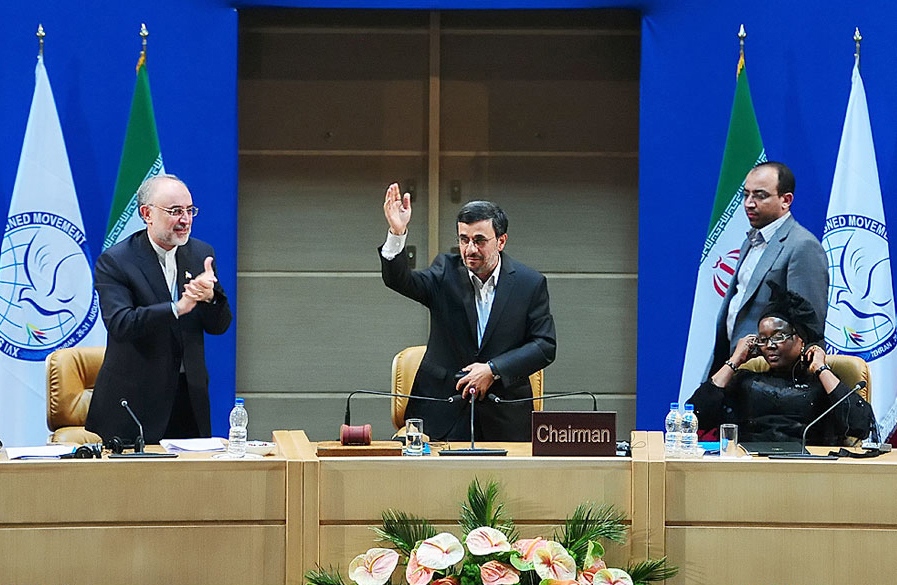
Ahmadinejad in the closing ceremony

Iranian state media has been heavily criticized for distorting part of Egyptian President Morsi's speech at the summit.

On 30 August 2012, during the summit, some Iranian media outlets reported that official Iranian stations were deceiving Iranians by tampering with the Persian translation of Egyptian President Morsi's speech, in order to fit the Iranian government's rhetoric – namely, opposing criticism of the Assad government in Syria, an ally of Iran. Iranian official state television refused to translate part of Morsi's speech which criticized Syria. One outlet reported that the Iranian interpreter translated part of Morsi's speech which criticized Assad as in fact supporting Assad, saying that "we must support the ruling regime in Syria." In another case, when Morsi denounced the Syrian government as "tyrannical", the Iranian translator quoted Morsi as saying that "there's a crisis in Syria and all of us must support the Syrian ruling system."

Jahan News and Asiran, as well as other Iranian outlets, published the tampered speech, and deliberately highlighted parts of Morsi's speech without referring to Morsi's stance on Syria. In other cases, the Iranian translator exchanged the word Syria with Bahrain when discussing countries that have been affected by the Arab Spring, as well as "Islamic Awakening" instead of "Arab Spring." Iranian media activist Ameed Maqdam Maqdam reported that this could not have happened unless the translator received orders from Iranian higher authorities, aiming to deceive Iranian public opinion.

In addition, Iranian media confirmed changes to speeches delivered by United Nations Secretary-General Ban Ki-moon and United Nations General Assembly President Nassir Abdulaziz Al-Nasser and apologies to the people.

As a result, Bahrain criticized the Iranian media for distorting Morsi's speech, and for replacing "Syria" with "Bahrain."

== See also ==
- Sixty-seventh session of the United Nations General Assembly
