= John Albers =

American politician

Member of the Georgia State Senate from the 56th district
- Incumbent
- Assumed office January 10, 2011
- Preceded by: Dan Moody

Personal details
- Born: August 18, 1972 (age 54)
- Party: Republican
- Spouse: Kari Albers
- Education: University of Louisville (BS); University of Georgia
- Occupation: Executive; Business Owner
- Website: www.senatoralbers.com

John Edward Albers is a Georgia State Senator serving the 56th District, which encompasses portions of Fulton, Cobb and Cherokee Counties.

== Early life and education ==
Albers earned his Bachelor of Science degree in organizational leadership from the University of Louisville. Albers also graduated from the University of Georgia's Legislative Leadership Institute and the Cybersecurity program at Harvard University.

== Political career ==
Albers was first elected to serve as senator for Georgia's 56th District in the 2010 general election. Albers has won re-election every two years from 2012 through 2026. Albers is a member of the Republican Party.

In the legislature, Albers serves as chairman of the Senate Public Safety Committee, sub committee chairman of Appropriations, and vice chairman of the Senate Finance Committee. He also sits on the Senate Government Oversight, and Regulated Industries, and Rules Committees.

On February 11, 2021, Albers co-sponsored Senate Bill 171, which increases penalties for certain offenses committed during an "unlawful assembly." The bill failed to receive a committee vote before Georgia's crossover day. The American Civil Liberties Union of Georgia said the bill "tramples on and makes a mockery of the First Amendment."

In January 2024, Albers co-sponsored S.B. 390, which would withhold government funding for any libraries in Georgia affiliated with the American Library Association. The bill was drafted following the election of ALA President Emily Drabinski and allegations of the organization promoting a personal ideology and influencing librarian certification.

In 2026, Albers sponsored legislation in the Georgia legislature to remove party labels in elections in the five most populous counties in metro Atlanta, but not in other parts of Georgia. This proposed legislation was introduced at the same time that the Republican Party was increasingly performing poorly in metro Atlanta. Albers said, "This is a bill that makes perfect senseIf you’re playing politics, you’ll be against this. If you want to keep Georgians safe, you’ll be for it." Democratic critics of the bill said it was intended to help Republicans get elected by obscuring their partisan affiliation.

== See also ==
- List of state government committees (Georgia)

Georgia State Senate
Preceded by Dan Moody	Georgia State Senate, 56th District; 2011–present	Incumbent
