= LaHood =

LaHood is a surname. Notable people with the surname include:

- Darin LaHood (born 1968), American politician, son of Ray
- John LaHood (born 1979), American politician from Georgia
- Mike LaHood (born 1944), American football guard
- Nico LaHood (born 1972), American attorney and judge
- Ray LaHood (born 1945), American politician

== See also ==
- Lahoud
- Ladhood
