= Baabdat =

Baabdat بعبدات
- City
- Location within Lebanon
- Coordinates: 33°53′N 35°40′E
- Country: Lebanon
- Governorate: Mount Lebanon Governorate
- District: Matn District
- Highest elevation: 1,100 m (3,600 ft)
- Lowest elevation: 600 m (2,000 ft)
- Time zone: UTC+2 (EET)
  - Summer (DST): UTC+3 (EEST)
- Dialing code: +961

Baabdat (Arabic: بعبدات, romanized: Bʿabdāt) is a town located in the Matn District of Mount Lebanon, 22 km from Beirut at an altitude ranging between 600 and 1100 meters above sea level. The lush pine forests that surround the town make it a very popular summer resort for those escaping the busy coastal cities of Lebanon, especially the capital, Beirut. The town's proximity to Brummana, one of Mount Lebanon's most active summer destinations, makes Baabdat a major tourist destination in the summer.

== Demography ==
The inhabitants of Baabdat are members either of the Maronite Catholic Church, or the Melkite Greek Catholic Church, or the Latin Catholic Church.

== Etymology ==
The name "Baabdat" is derivative of the Aramaic words, beit abdutha, meaning "the home of adoration". The Aramaic name refers to an ancient temple that was built by the Phoenicians to worship the ancient Canaanite, Greek and later Roman gods.

== History ==
When Lebanon was part of the Roman Empire, Baabdat was home to wood hewers who supplied Beirut's shipyards with timbers.

== Landmarks and Attractions ==
Baabdat is known for its natural scenery, including forests of pine and oak trees that surround the village and offer opportunities for hiking and outdoor activities. Key landmarks include:

Churches and Monasteries: The village is home to historic churches, including Saint Anthony’s Church and Our Lady of Deliverance, which are important centers of worship and heritage for the local community.

Cultural Sites: Baabdat hosts occasional cultural and community events, particularly during local festivals that celebrate religious or seasonal events. Pine Forests and Trails: Baabdat’s pine-covered mountains attract nature lovers and are ideal for picnics, hikes, and family outings.

== Notable people from Baabdat ==
- Émile Lahoud- Lebanon's former president
- Nassib Lahoud- politician
- Carmen Labaki- film director
- Nadine Labaki- director and actress
- Salma Hayek- director and actress (her father has ancestry from Baabdat)
- Jamil Lahoud- A former army officer and minister
- Leonard Melki- A beatified Catholic priest

== Notables who live in Baabdat ==
Although a native of Beirut, Maxime Chaya (the first from his country to climb Everest and ski all-the-way to both poles) moved to Baabdat where he now lives year-long with his children Edgard and Kelly.

== Religious Structures ==
Like most mountain villages of Lebanon, Baabdat is home to numerous, historic churches, monasteries and convents.

- Saint Mamas Church, built in the 16th century
- Saint George Church, built in the mid-18th century
- Our Lady of Deliverance Church, built in 1851
- Saint Michael Greek Catholic Church
- Saint Anthony of Padua Convent, completed in 1900

== Climate ==
Climate data for Baabdat
Month	Jan	Feb	Mar	Apr	May	Jun	Jul	Aug	Sep	Oct	Nov	Dec	Year
Mean daily maximum °C (°F)	12.7 (54.9)	13.3 (55.9)	16.0 (60.8)	20.6 (69.1)	24.8 (76.6)	27.9 (82.2)	29.6 (85.3)	29.9 (85.8)	27.5 (81.5)	24.7 (76.5)	19.5 (67.1)	15.0 (59.0)	21.8 (71.2)
Daily mean °C (°F)	8.8 (47.8)	9.2 (48.6)	11.4 (52.5)	15.1 (59.2)	18.8 (65.8)	21.7 (71.1)	23.2 (73.8)	23.5 (74.3)	21.4 (70.5)	19.0 (66.2)	14.6 (58.3)	10.9 (51.6)	16.5 (61.6)
Mean daily minimum °C (°F)	4.9 (40.8)	5.2 (41.4)	6.8 (44.2)	9.7 (49.5)	12.8 (55.0)	15.5 (59.9)	16.8 (62.2)	17.1 (62.8)	15.4 (59.7)	13.4 (56.1)	9.8 (49.6)	6.8 (44.2)	11.2 (52.1)
Average precipitation mm (inches)	238 (9.4)	204 (8.0)	167 (6.6)	76 (3.0)	30 (1.2)	1 (0.0)	1 (0.0)	1 (0.0)	6 (0.2)	41 (1.6)	114 (4.5)	187 (7.4)	1,066 (41.9)
