= Nassib Lahoud =

Lebanese Christian political figure (1944–2012)

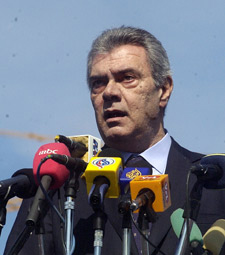
- Born: 23 November 1944; Baabdat, Lebanon
- Died: 2 February 2012 (age 67); Beirut, Lebanon
- Occupations: Engineer and politician
- Years active: 1970s-2012
- Political party: Democratic Renewal Movement
- Spouse: Abla Fustok
- Children: Salim and Joumana
- Parent(s): Salim Lahoud and Nadia Yared

Nassib Lahoud (23 November 1944 – 2 February 2012) was a Lebanese political figure. He held various posts including Member of parliament, Ambassador to the United States of America, and Minister of State (without portfolio) . He was also head of the Democratic Renewal Movement and a leading figure in the March 14 coalition, which nominated him as their presidential candidate when they held the parliamentary majority in 2008. His election was vetoed by Hezbollah and its allies, who refused to attend parliament and threatened not to recognise any president who was not the product of a consensus agreement between Lebanese political forces. President Michel Suleiman was elected to the post on 25 May 2008.

Upon his death, Nassib Lahoud was referred to as the "President of our dreams" by Hezbollah's opponents as well as journalists and prominent members of civil society.

== Early life and education ==
Nassib Lahoud was born in Baabdat, Matn, Lebanon on 23 November 1944. He was a member of the Lahoud family, one of the most prominent Lebanese-Christian political families (See List of political families). He was the son of ex-Member of Parliament, former minister of foreign affairs and minister of defense Salim Lahoud under President Camille Chamoun in the 1960s.

Lahoud earned a BS degree in electrical engineering from Loughborough University, United Kingdom in 1968.

== Career ==
After finishing his engineering studies, Lahoud founded Lahoud Engineering Co. Ltd. London (1972); the company's activities are mostly the construction of large-scale power and heavy industry plants. Lahoud had a career as businessman, both within Lahoud Engineering, and in the field of real estate, and was one of the largest landowners in the Metn. Lahoud was also a prolific art collector, and was particularly interested in European impressionist masters as well as Lebanese contemporary artists.

Throughout his years as a businessman, Lahoud was active in Lebanese politics and was close to President Camille Chamoun until 1972, when Chamoun supported another candidate at the parliamentary elections. In the 1980s, still living in Mayfair, London, Lahoud became less interested in business and shifted his focus to Lebanese politics.

== Politics ==
After his backstage participation in the Taif conference in Saudi Arabia, which ended the destructive Lebanese civil war, he became ambassador to the United States of America, where he had high-level relationships with leading U.S. politicians. In 1991 he returned to Lebanon and was appointed Maronite Christian parliamentarian of the Metn region. He was re-elected in organised legislative elections in 1992, 1996 and in 2000.

From the beginning of his political life, he situated himself in the opposition to the pro-Syrian governments that ruled the country. He opposed the economic policies of the late prime minister Rafiq Hariri, and Syrian interference in the Lebanese political scene. He voted against the constitutional amendments imposed by Syria to extend the mandates of presidents Elias Hrawi in 1995, and Emile Lahoud in 2004.

In 2001 he joined the Qornet Shehwan Gathering, regrouping prominent Christian opposition figures under the patronage of Maronite Patriarch Nasrallah Boutros Sfeir.

The same year, he founded along with about two hundreds and fifty Lebanese intellectuals (including Misbah Ahdab, Camille Ziadé, Nadim Salem, Antoine Haddad, Ziad Baroud, Wafic Zantout, Mona Fayad, Hareth Sleiman, Malek Mroueh, and Melhem Chaoul) the Democratic Renewal Movement. A movement that presents itself as a reformist and laic, opposition political movement.

He was a prominent figure of the anti-Syrian opposition movement that started to organise after the extension of the pro-Syrian president Emile Lahoud's term and which gained more political weight following the assassination of Rafiq Hariri on 14 February 2005.

The Democratic Renewal Movement was part of the March 14 Alliance, which started as an anti-Syrian coalition. Nassib Lahoud took part in the 2005 legislative elections in his Metn district, at the head of the opposition list. He lost the elections against Michel Aoun's Free Patriotic Movement and allied pro-Syrian figures.

== Presidential elections ==
Nassib Lahoud was since 1995 considered to be one of the most serious candidates for the presidency. Despite his defeat in the parliamentary elections in 2005, after four terms in office, he announced that he was prepared to run for president if the March 14 Alliance - with a majority in parliament - decided to back him. His willingness to run for the presidency was part of a wider campaign to remove the pro-Syrian president Emile Lahoud (Nassib's cousin) who was widely considered to be the last bastion of Syrian hegemony over the country.

In 2008 the parliamentary majority ultimately designated Lahoud as its presidential nominee but the Hezbollah-led opposition refused to attend a legislative session to elect a new president, thus ensuring there was no quorum. President Michel Suleiman was later elected by consensus after Hezbollah threatened not to yield to a state if the president was Nassib Lahoud or any other candidate chosen by the parliamentary majority.

Testament to the political tension prevalent during those times, Hezbollah supporters eventually attacked March 14 majority-affiliated buildings and newspapers in Beirut, in a show of force reminiscent of the days of the Lebanese civil war. This was due to a refusal by the government to rescind two controversial executive decrees that aimed to dismantle Hezbollah's private telecommunications system as well as sack the military general responsible for airport security.

Nassib Lahoud was later appointed Minister of State, as the representative of the Ex-Qornet Shehwan Gathering, in the first government under President Michel Suleiman's mandate. Lahoud refused to run at the next parliamentary elections alongside old symbols of Syrian hegemony over Lebanon, even though they were now new independent allies of the March 14 coalition. He thus withdrew from the 2009 parliamentary elections,

== Personal life ==
Lahoud was married to Abla Fustuq, with whom he had two children, Salim and Joumana. He also had a step-daughter, Roula. Abla is part of the Fustuq business family, based in London. She is the sister of Mahmoud Fustuq and Aida Fustuq, who was once married to Saudi ruler King Abdullah.

Lahoud was very fond of his hometown Baabdat in the Metn. He was known for many high-profile friends and relationships within politics, arts, business, academics and society around the world. An avid chess and backgammon player, as well as art collector, Lahoud had close family and business ties with the Saudis.

== Death ==
Lahoud died at the age of 67 at Hotel Dieu Hospital in Ashrafieh, Beirut on 2 February 2012 after a long illness. He received a state funeral which was attended by the President and the Prime Minister and posthumous homages were published in many newspapers and Web sites.
