= Aida Fustuq =

Lebanese woman of Palestinian origin

- عايدة فستق
- Spouse: King Abdullah (divorced)
- Children: Princess Adila (daughter); Prince Abdulaziz (son)
- Relatives: Mahmoud Fustuq (brother); Nassib Lahoud (brother-in-law); Rifaat al-Assad (brother-in-law)

Aida Fustuq (Arabic: عايدة فستق) is a Lebanese woman of Palestinian origin who was one of the former wives of King Abdullah, who ruled Saudi Arabia between 2005 and 2015.

== Biography ==
Aida Fustuq hails from Lebanese Sunni family who are of Palestinian origin. She had eight siblings. Her brothers are businessmen, including Mahmoud Fustuq. One of her sisters, Abla Fustuq, was the spouse of Nassib Lahoud, a Lebanese politician. Another sister married Rifaat al-Assad of Syria.

Aida Fustuq married King Abdullah. Later they divorced. One of her children with King Abdullah is Princess Adila. The other one is Prince Abdulaziz, former assistant foreign minister.
