= Mahmoud Fustuq =

Lebanese businessman (1936–2006)

- Born: 1936
- Died: 8 February 2006 (aged 69–70); Pompano Beach, Florida, USA
- Burial place: Saudi Arabia
- Occupations: Petroleum engineer; Businessman
- Relatives: Aida Fustuq (sister); Nassib Lahoud (brother-in-law)

Mahmoud Fustuq (1936 – 8 February 2006) was a Lebanese businessman who had various companies in Saudi Arabia. He was known for being brother-in-law of former Saudi Arabian ruler King Abdullah and for his involvement in the horse business.

== Biography ==
Fustuq was born in Lebanon in 1936. His family is from Palestine. He was the eldest of nine siblings. He attended the University of Oklahoma in the late 1950s and received a degree in petroleum engineering. His sister, Aida, married King Abdullah. and another sister, Abla, was married to the Lebanese politician Nassib Lahoud.

== Thoroughbred horse racing ==
Fustuq had varied businesses in Saudi Arabia. He acquired the Buckram Oak Farm near Lexington, Kentucky, in 1978 which he sold in 2005. He also owned other farms in Ocala, Florida, and Kentucky where his racehorses, included Star Gallant who won the Illinois Derby in 1982 and Silver Train, who won a Breeder's Cup race. His other prominent horses were Najran, Silver Hawk Siberian Summer and Green Forest.

He died in Pompano Beach, Florida, on 8 February 2006 in a traffic accident. He was buried in Saudi Arabia.

=== Controversy ===
In the 1970s Fustuq acquired a commission from British Leyland following the sale of a fleet of Land Rovers by the company to the Saudi Arabian National Guard headed by Prince Abdullah, later King Abdullah. The Guardian reported that after this transaction he bought the farms in the USA and a mansion near Chantilly, France.
