= Adila bint Abdullah Al Saud =

Saudi royal

- Born: Beirut
- Spouse: Faisal bin Abdullah bin Mohammed Al Saud
- Adila bint Abdullah bin Abdulaziz Al Saud
- House: Al Saud
- Alma mater: King Saud University
- Father: King Abdullah
- Mother: Aida Fustuq

Adila bint Abdullah Al Saud (Arabic: عادلة بنت عبد الله آل سعود ʿAdila bint ʿAbd Allāh Āl Suʿūd) is a member of the Saudi royal family, one of the grandchildren of Saudi's founder King Abdulaziz. During the reign of her father, King Abdullah, she was one of the women who could influence the political development of Saudi Arabia in women-related areas, such as education, employment and health.

== Early life and education ==
Princess Adila was born in Beirut, Lebanon. She is the fifth daughter of King Abdullah. Her mother is Aida Fustuq, a Lebanese woman of Palestinian descent. Her parents divorced later. Prince Abdulaziz is her full brother.

She received a bachelor of arts degree in English literature from King Saud University.

== Activities ==
Adila bint Abdullah was one of the few Saudi princesses with a semi-public role during the reign of King Abdullah. She acted as the public face of him. She is a known advocate of women's right to drive, women's health awareness and their legal rights. She spoke out against domestic violence and supported women's groups and organizations.

Princess Adila is the patron of many charitable foundations: she is the chair of the National Home Health Care Foundation; the president of the consultative committee of the National Museum; president of the Sanad Children's Cancer Support Society; and the deputy chair of the National Family Safety Program. Princess Adila also supported the businesswomen of the Jeddah Chamber of Commerce and Industry. She was also patron of "Saudi Women’s Forum", a women's conference in Jeddah in 2007. She led the Saudi Society for Preservation of Heritage.

=== Views ===
Interview with Princess Adila was included in Mona Almunajjed's book entitled Saudi Women Speak: 24 Remarkable Women Tell Their Success Stories, published in 2011 by the Arab Institute for Research and Publishing in Amman and Beirut. She stated: "I am only one part of this whole society, and I am presenting my point of view. However, we cannot go back. We need to become more liberal, and we need to change." She believes that wearing the niqab is a tradition and the scarf is a better alternative.

== Personal life ==
Princess Adila married her cousin Faisal bin Abdullah in her 20s. Faisal bin Abdullah served as the minister of education from February 2009 to 22 December 2013. Moreover, Faisal is the former deputy director of the General Intelligence Directorate (GID).

Adila and Faisal have six children, two sons and four daughters. One of their daughters is a graduate of King's College in London.
