= Georgia General Assembly =

Legislative branch of the state government of Georgia

- The Great Seal of Georgia

Type
- Type: Bicameral
- Houses: Senate; House of Representatives
- Term limits: None

Leadership
- Senate President: Burt Jones (R) since January 9, 2023
- Senate President pro tempore: Larry Walker III (R) since January 12, 2026
- House Speaker: Jon G. Burns (R) since January 9, 2023

Structure
- Seats: 236 voting members: 56 senators; 180 representatives
- Senate political groups: Republican (31); Democratic (23); Vacant (2)
- House political groups: Republican (99); Democratic (79); Vacant (2)
- Length of term: 2 years
- Salary: $17,342/year + per diem

Elections
- Last Senate election: November 5, 2024
- Last House election: November 5, 2024
- Next Senate election: 2026
- Next House election: 2026

Motto
- Wisdom, Justice, and Moderation

Meeting place
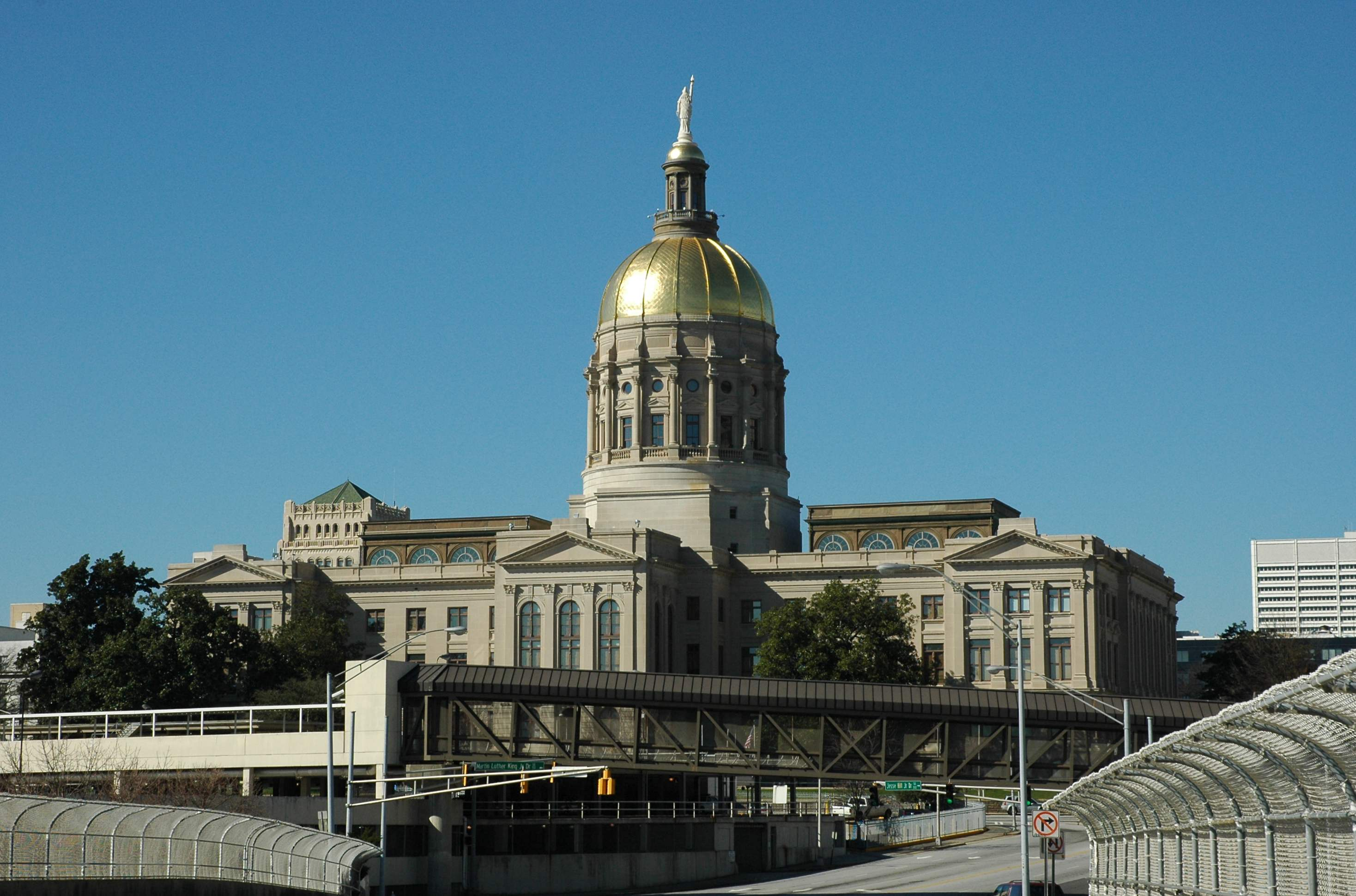
- Georgia State Capitol; Atlanta

Website
- legis.ga.gov

Constitution
- Constitution of Georgia

The Georgia General Assembly is the state legislature of the U.S. state of Georgia. It is bicameral, consisting of the Senate and the House of Representatives.

Each of the General Assembly's 236 members serve two-year terms and are directly elected by constituents of their district. The Constitution of Georgia vests all legislative power with the General Assembly. Both houses have similar powers, though each has unique duties as well. For example, the origination of appropriations bills only occurs in the House, while the Senate is tasked with confirmation of the governor's appointments.

The General Assembly meets in the Georgia State Capitol in Atlanta.

== History ==
The General Assembly, which is the legislative branch of the state's government, is older than the United States Congress. During its existence the Assembly has moved four different times when the state capital changed its location. The first location of the Assembly was Savannah, then Augusta and Louisville, moving from there to Milledgeville, and finally to Atlanta in 1868.

=== The General Assembly in Savannah ===
By January 1777 Savannah had become the capital of Georgia—when the former colony declared independence from Britain. The legislature, then a unicameral body, met there in 1777–1778—retreating to Augusta when the British captured the city. They were not in Augusta long before it was captured by the British in 1779. Augusta changed hands three times during the war, finally returning to American possession in July 1781. They stayed in Augusta until the British left Savannah in May 1782 and the legislature returned to the capital.

=== Move to Augusta ===
Between 1783 and 1785, the Georgia General Assembly met in both Savannah and Augusta—moving from there when tensions arose between the two cities, causing then Governor Lyman Hall to officially reside in both places. On February 22, 1785, the General Assembly held its last meeting in Savannah—Augusta had become the official capital due to pressure from the general populace to have their capital in the center of the state.

=== On to Louisville ===
As the population dispersed—shifting the geographic center, it was determined that the state's capital needed to move as well. A commission was appointed by the legislature in 1786 to find a suitable location that was central to the new demography. The commission recommended Louisville, which would become Georgia's first planned capital and would hold her first capitol building. Due to the fact that the capital would have to be built from the ground up, and because of numerous construction delays, it took a decade to build the city. The name Louisville was chosen by the General Assembly in honor of King Louis XVI for France's aid during the Revolutionary War.

The new state house, a two-story 18th century Gregorian building of red brick, was completed in 1796. The Legislature designated Louisville the "permanent seat" of Georgia's government. Yet, further western expansion created the need for another new state capital. The capitol building was purchased by Jefferson County and used as a courthouse, but the building had to be torn down because it became unsound. A plaque marks the location of the old Capitol.

=== The Assembly arrives in Milledgeville ===
Ordinance of Secession
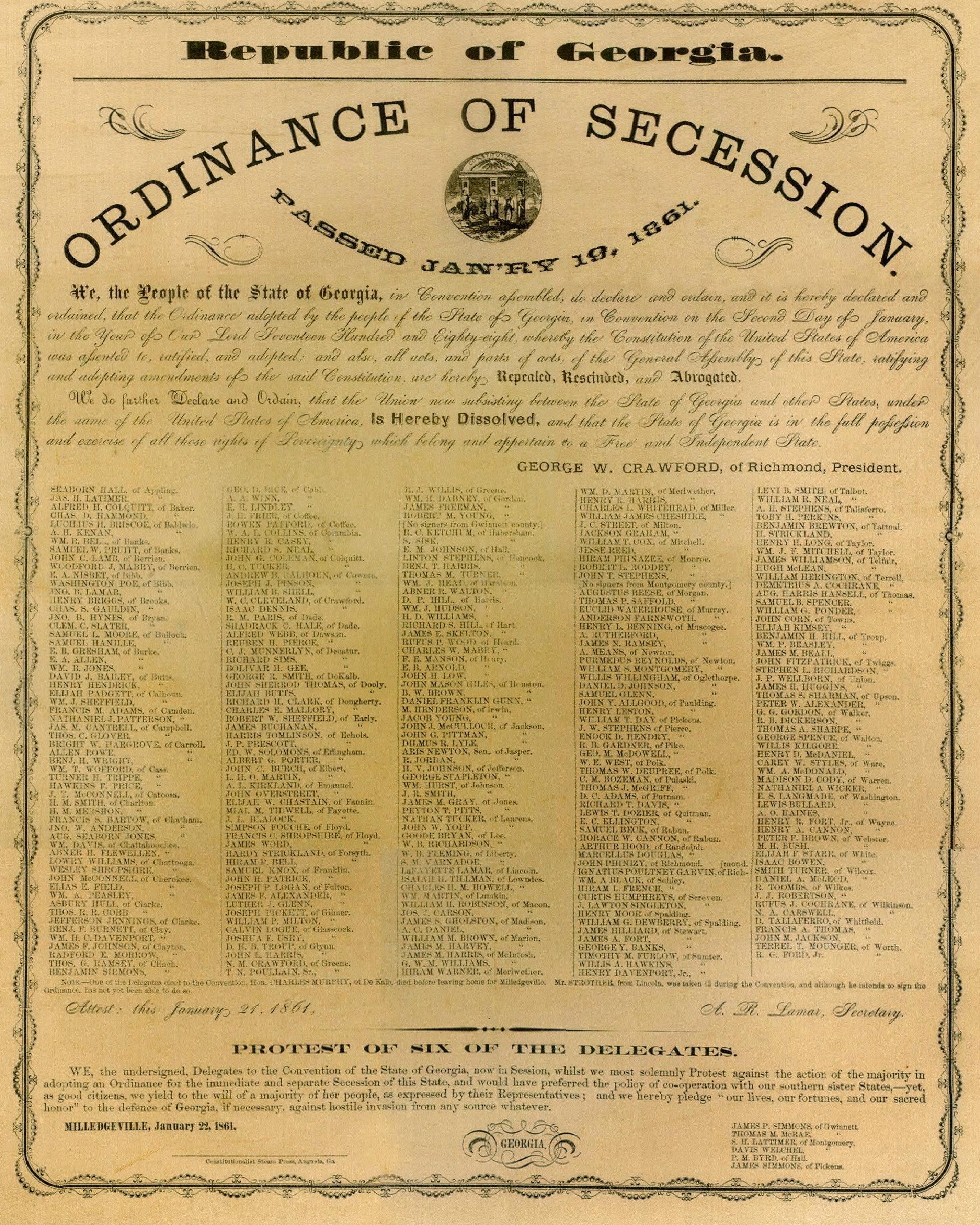
- Facsimile of the 1861 Ordinance of Secession signed by 293 delegates to the Georgia Secession Convention at the statehouse in Milledgeville, Georgia January 21, 1861.

Full text
- Ordinance of Secession at Wikisource

In 1804, the state government decided that yet another capital, would be needed. Subsequently, an act was passed authorizing construction of a new capital city on 3,240 acres (13 km^{2}) in the area currently known as Baldwin County. The city was named Milledgeville in honor of Governor John Milledge.

The new Capitol took two years to complete and was a brick construction in the Gothic Revival style. The legislature convened The Georgia Secession Convention of 1861 in the Milledgeville statehouse on January 16, 1861. On January 19, delegates voted for Georgia to secede from the Union—208 in favor with 89 against—drafting a new constitution, and declaring the state an independent Republic.

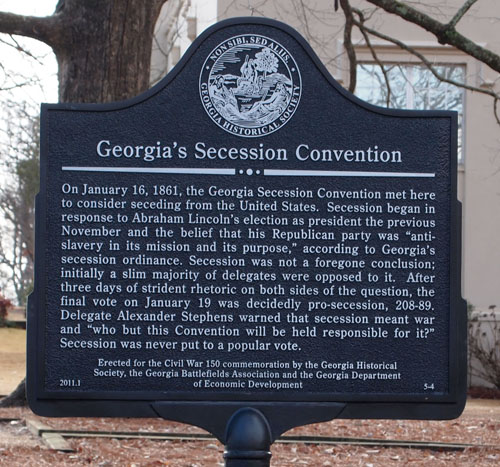
Georgia's Secession Convention historical marker, erected in 2011 for the Civil War 150 commemoration by the Georgia Historical Society.

On January 21, Assembly delegates (secessionists finishing with a slight majority of delegates) celebrated their decision by a public signing of the Ordinance of Secession outside of the State Capitol. Later that year, the legislature also voted to send $100,000 to South Carolina for "the relief of Charlestonians" who suffered a disastrous fire in December 1861. With General Sherman's approach, the members of the General Assembly adjourned in fall 1864, reconvening briefly in Macon in 1865. As the American Civil War came to a close with the federal government in military control of Georgia, the legislature reconvened at the Capitol in Milledgeville.

=== Atlanta ===
In 1867, Major General John Pope, military governor of Georgia, called for an assembly in Atlanta to hold a constitutional convention. At that time Atlanta officials moved once again to have the city designated as Georgia's state capital, donating the property where Atlanta's first city hall was constructed. The constitutional convention agreed and the people voted to ratify the decision on April 20, 1868. The Georgia General Assembly first convened in Atlanta on July 4, 1868.

In 1884, the legislature appropriated one million dollars to build a new State Capitol. Construction began October 26, 1884, and the building was completed (slightly under budget) and occupied on June 15, 1889.

Notably, the dome atop the capitol building is plated with real gold, most of which came from the Dahlonega, Georgia area. The roofing gives rise to local colloquialisms—for instance, if one knowledgeable Georgian wanted to ask another what the General Assembly was doing, he might ask what was happening "under the gold dome."

== Organization and procedure of the General Assembly ==
The General Assembly meets in regular session on the second Monday in January for no longer than 40 legislative (rather than calendar) days each year. Neither the House nor the Senate can adjourn during a regular session for longer than three days or meet in any place other than the state capitol without the other house's consent. The legislative session usually lasts from January until late March or early April. When the General Assembly is not sitting, legislative committees may still meet to discuss specific issues. In cases of emergency, the Governor can summon a special session of the Assembly. Days in special session do not count towards the 40-day constitutional limit.

=== Committees ===
Both the House and Senate are organized into various legislative committees. All bills introduced in the General Assembly will be referred to at least one committee. Committee chairs usually come from the majority party. Committee chairs determine the business of the committee, including which bills get a hearing.

=== Rules of procedure, employees and interim committees ===
Each house of the General Assembly may determine procedural rules governing its own employees. The General Assembly as a whole, or each house separately, has the ability to create interim committees.

At the beginning of each two-year term, the House elects a speaker, who is always from the majority party. Unlike in the federal House of Representatives, the speaker usually presides over sittings of the House. There is also a speaker pro tempore, who presides in the absence of the speaker.

The Lieutenant Governor of Georgia is the ex officio president of the State Senate. The lieutenant governor is elected for a four-year term in a statewide vote along with the governor. The lieutenant governor does not have the power to introduce legislation.

=== Oath of office ===
Before taking office senators and representatives must swear (or affirm) an oath—stipulated by state law.

=== Legislative procedure ===
A majority of the members to which each house is entitled constitutes a quorum to transact business. A smaller number may adjourn from day to day and compel the presence of its absent members. In order for a bill to become law, it must be passed by both chambers of the General Assembly, and receive the governor's signature. In each chamber, the number of votes required to pass a bill is determined according to the number of seats in the chamber, not merely the number of votes cast. Therefore, a bill must receive 91 votes in the House (a majority of its membership) and 29 votes in the Senate, regardless of the number of legislators voting. In the case of a tie, the presiding officer of each chamber may cast the deciding vote.

Some motions require more than an absolute majority to pass. A resolution to amend the state constitution, for instance, requires a two-thirds vote in both chambers (121 votes in the House and 38 votes in the Senate).

All senators and representatives are entitled to introduce bills and resolutions. Bills are intended to have the force of law, while resolutions may or may not have any practical effect. Bills and resolutions are referred to a legislative committee by the presiding officer as soon as they are introduced. The presiding officer has discretion in referring a bill to any committee, although the chamber may vote to move a bill to a different committee.

Committee chairs determine which bills will be heard in committee. Bills that do not get a committee hearing cannot proceed, and the majority of bills die in committee this way. Because most committee chairs are from the majority party, bills that are introduced by members of the majority are much more likely to be heard. The vast majority of legislation considered by the Assembly is introduced by the majority party. Committees will hear testimony from a bill's sponsor, as well as experts in the public and private sectors and concerned citizens. Members of the committee may ask questions of the sponsor. Committees usually amend bills under their consideration; an amended version of a bill is known as a "substitute." Once the committee is done debating, it will vote on the bill, as well as any proposed amendments. If the bill is approved, it is transmitted to the Committee on Rules.

Both the House and Senate have a Rules committee. The House Committee on Rules meets early in the morning on most legislative days to determine which bills will get a floor vote that day. Power in House Rules is highly centralized, and the committee usually acts as a rubber stamp for decisions already made by the chairperson, the speaker, and even the governor. The Senate Committee on Rules meets after each legislative day, to determine the agenda for the next legislative day.

For the first 28 days in a legislative session, the House and Senate only consider legislation introduced by their own members. After the 28th day, bills passed by one chamber will "cross over" to the other, hence why the day is known as "Crossover Day." After Crossover Day, no new bills will be considered. If a bill, after having crossed over to the other chamber, is amended in committee on the floor, it will have to return to the original chamber for final approval. Further amendments may be made, and the bill will move back and forth until both chambers agree. If the two chambers cannot agree on the final version of a bill by the end of the session, the bill is not passed.

=== Vacancies ===
Whenever a vacancy occurs in the General Assembly, an event that occurs whenever a member dies, resigns, or moves from the district from which he was elected, it is filled according to Georgia law and the Constitution. If the vacancy occurs anytime prior to the end of the legislative session in the second year of a term, the governor must issue a writ of special election within ten days of the vacancy occurring, and, if the vacancy occurs after the end of the legislative session in the second year of a term, then the governor may choose to issue a writ of special election. But, if the vacancy exists at the time that an extraordinary session is called, then the governor must issue a writ of special election within 2 days after the call for the extraordinary session, and, if the vacancy occurs after the call but before the special session has concluded, then the governor must issue a writ of special election within 5 days of the occurrence. In each case, the writ of special election must designate a day on which the election will be held, which must be no less than 30 days and no more than 60 days after the governor issues the writ.

=== Salaries ===
Members of the General Assembly receive salaries provided by law, so long as that salary does not increase before the end of the term during which the increase becomes effective. Members of the Georgia General Assembly currently earn $17,000 a year.

=== Election and returns; disorderly conduct ===
Each house holds the responsibility of judging the election, returns, and qualifications of its own members. Also, each house has the power to punish its own members for disorderly misconduct. Punishments for such conduct include:

- censure
- fine
- imprisonment
- expulsion

However, no member may be expelled except upon a two-thirds vote of the house in which he or she sits.

=== Contempt ===
When a person is guilty of contempt, the individual may be imprisoned if ordered by either the House or the Senate.

=== Elections by either house ===
All elections of the General Assembly are to be recorded. The recorded vote then appears in the journal of each house.

=== Open meetings ===
Sessions of the General Assembly, including committee meetings, are open to the public except when either house makes an exception.

=== Legislative history ===
The General Assembly does not publish reports and does not keep bill files. Major legislation is discussed in detail in the Peach Sheets, a student-written part of Georgia State University College of Law's Law Review. Recent Peach Sheet articles are available in an online archive. Otherwise, Peach Sheets articles should be included in the Georgia State Law Review databases on Lexis, Westlaw and HeinOnline.

== Composition ==
The Georgia General Assembly began in 1777 as a body consisting of the lower House of Assembly to which counties elected two members each, and an Executive Council, which included a councillor elected by their respective Assembly delegation. After the enactment of the Georgia Constitution of 1789, the body was changed to a bicameral legislature of a Senate and House of Representatives, both to be directly elected. From 1789 to 1795, senators were elected every three years, and after the enactment of the May 1795 Constitution, senators were elected annually to one-year terms. Senators were moved to two-terms after December 5, 1843.

It is now made up of a Senate (the upper house) and a House of Representatives (the lower house). The Senate has 56 members while the House of Representatives has 180. Members from each body serve for two years, but have no limit to the number of times they can be re-elected. Both senators and representatives are elected from their constituents' districts.

=== Qualifications for election ===
The Georgia Constitution stipulates that members of the Senate must be citizens of the United States, at least 25 years old, a citizen of the state of Georgia at least two years, and a legal resident of the district the senator was elected to. Members of the House of Representatives must be citizens of the United States, at least 21 years old, a Georgia citizen for at least two years, and a legal resident of the district the representative was elected for at least one year.

=== Disqualifications ===
According to the Georgia Constitution Article III Section II Paragraph IV:

- No person on active duty with any branch of the armed forces of the United States shall have a seat in either house unless otherwise provided by law.
- No person holding any civil appointment or office having any emolument annexed thereto under the United States, this state, or any other state shall have a seat in either house.
- No Senator or Representative shall be elected by the General Assembly or appointed by the Governor to any office or appointment having any emolument annexed thereto during the time for which such person shall have been elected unless the Senator or Representative shall first resign the seat to which elected; provided, however, that, during the term for which elected, no Senator or Representative shall be appointed to any civil office which has been created during such term.

=== Officers ===
The presiding officer of the Senate is the President of the Senate or Lieutenant Governor. Like the United States Senate, a President Pro Tempore is elected by the Senate from among its members. The President Pro Tempore acts as president in case of the temporary disability of the President. In case of the death, resignation, or permanent disability of the President or in the event of the succession of the President to the executive power, the President Pro Tempore becomes President. The Senate also has as an officer the Secretary of the Senate.

The House of Representatives elects its own Speaker and a Speaker Pro Tempore. The Speaker Pro Tempore becomes Speaker in case of the death, resignation, or permanent disability of the Speaker. The Speaker Pro Tempore serves until a new Speaker is elected. The House also has as an officer the Clerk of the House of Representatives.

=== Historic composition ===
The 1866 Constitution called for 22 seats in the Senate and 175 seats in the House. The 1877 Constitution expanded the Senate to 44 seats while keeping 175 members in the House.

== Powers and privileges ==
Article III Section VI of the Georgia State Constitution specifies the powers given to the Georgia General Assembly. Paragraph I states, "The General Assembly shall have the power to make all laws not inconsistent with this Constitution, and not repugnant to the Constitution of the United States, which it shall deem necessary and proper for the welfare of the state." Moreover, the powers the Constitution gives the Assembly include land use restrictions to protect and preserve the environment and natural resources; the creation, use and disciplining through court martial of a state militia which would be under the command of the Governor of Georgia acting as commander-in-chief (excepting times when the militia is under Federal command); The power to expend public money, to condemn property, and to zone property; The continuity of state and local governments during times of emergency; state participation in tourism. The use, control and regulation of outdoor advertising within the state.

=== Limitation of powers ===
Paragraph V of Article III Section VI states that:

- The General Assembly shall not have the power to grant incorporation to private persons but shall provide by general law the manner in which private corporate powers and privileges may be granted.
- The General Assembly shall not forgive the forfeiture of the charter of any corporation existing on August 13, 1945, nor shall it grant any benefit to or permit any amendment to the charter of any corporation except upon the condition that the acceptance thereof shall operate as a novation of the charter and that such corporation shall thereafter hold its charter subject to the provisions of this Constitution.
- The General Assembly shall not have the power to authorize any contract or agreement which may have the effect of or which is intended to have the effect of defeating or lessening competition, or encouraging a monopoly, which are hereby declared to be unlawful and void.
- The General Assembly shall not have the power to regulate or fix charges of public utilities owned or operated by any county or municipality of this state, except as authorized by this Constitution.
- No municipal or county authority which is authorized to construct, improve, or maintain any road or street on behalf of, pursuant to a contract with, or through the use of taxes or other revenues of a county or municipal corporation shall be created by any local Act or pursuant to any general Act nor shall any law specifically relating to any such authority be amended unless the creation of such authority or the amendment of such law is conditioned upon the approval of a majority of the qualified voters of the county or municipal corporation affected voting in a referendum thereon. This subparagraph shall not apply to or affect any state authority.

=== Privileges of members ===
Members of the Georgia General Assembly maintain two important privileges during their time in office. First, no member of either house of the Assembly can be arrested during sessions of the General Assembly or during committee meetings except in cases of treason, felony, or "breach of the peace". Also, members are not liable for anything they might say in either the House or the Senate or in any committee meetings of both.

== See also ==
- Georgia Senate
- Georgia House of Representatives
- List of state government committees (Georgia)
- List of Georgia state legislatures
