= Abdulaziz bin Abdullah Al Saud =

Saudi royal and businessman (born 1962)

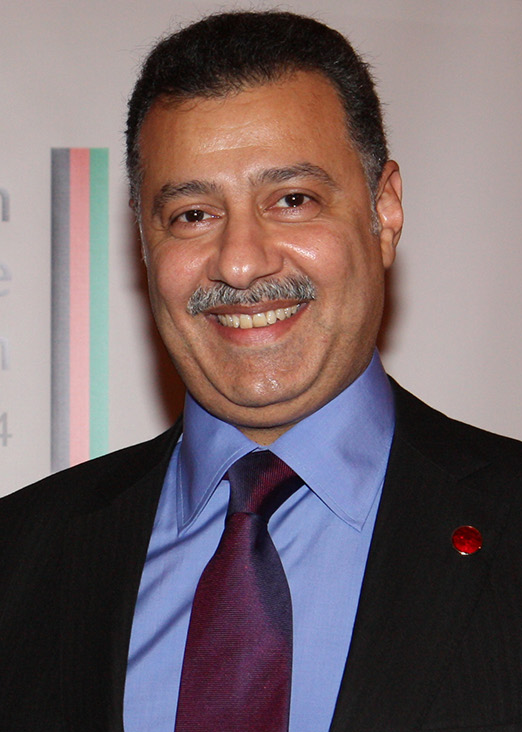
- Abdulaziz bin Abdullah in London, December 2014

Deputy Minister of Foreign Affairs
- In office: 22 July 2011 — April 2015
- Monarch: Abdullah; Salman
- Prime Minister: King Abdullah; King Salman
- Born: 27 October 1962 (age 63); Riyadh
- Spouse: Abeer bint Turki bin Nasser (divorced); Nathalie Ghassan Maamary
- Issue: Sadeem; Abdullah; Khalid; Lana
Names
- Abdulaziz bin Abdullah bin Abdulaziz Al Saud
- House: Al Saud
- Father: King Abdullah
- Mother: Aida Fustuq
- Education: University of Hertfordshire

Abdulaziz bin Abdullah Al Saud (Arabic: عبد العزيز بن عبد الله آل سعود ʿAbd al ʿAzīz bin ʿAbd Allāh Āl Suʿūd; born 27 October 1962) is a Saudi royal, the fourth son of King Abdullah and one of the grandsons of Saudi's founder King Abdulaziz, and a businessman who served as the deputy minister of foreign affairs from 2011 to 2015.

== Early life and education ==
Prince Abdulaziz was born in Riyadh on 27 October 1962. He is the fourth son of King Abdullah. His mother is Aida Fustuq, a Lebanese woman. His full sister is Adila bint Abdullah.

Abdulaziz bin Abdullah graduated from the University of Hertfordshire with a Bachelor of Arts degree in Political Science in 1986.

== Career ==
Abdulaziz bin Abdullah served in the Saudi Arabian National Guard for fifteen years in different positions. In 1991, he was appointed as an advisor to Crown Prince Abdullah. Specifically, he was advisor of the Crown Prince Abdullah for Syrian affairs. He was also a state minister.

King Abdullah appointed Prince Abdulaziz as deputy foreign minister on 22 July 2011. During the Syrian civil war, Prince Abdulaziz asked Turkey to establish "nerve centre" attempting to topple Bashar al-Assad. The center was founded in Adana in the mid-2012. Prince Abdulaziz personally dealt with Bashar al-Assad's file following the civil war in Syria.

Prince Abdulaziz represented Saudi Arabia at the Non-Aligned Movement summit in Tehran from 30 to 31 August 2012, since foreign affairs minister Prince Saud had an operation and could not attend the meeting. Prince Abdulaziz met with Iranian President Mahmud Ahmadinejad during his stay in Tehran. His tenure ended in April 2015 when Saud Al Faisal resigned from his post as foreign minister due to health concerns.

=== Business activities ===
Prince Abdulaziz is owner of Tower Lane Properties, a land development firm. It is reported that the company spent $12 million on five-and-a-quarter acres of land in the Benedict Canyon in 2009, and applied for permits to build a mansion. The project, later, was reduced to 60,000-square-foot. However, more than 1,000 residents of the area signed a petition against this project, requiring an environmental review. The Prince's lawyers filed a case against this petition. Prince Abdulaziz won his lawsuit against the city of Los Angeles in late August 2012.

== Other activities ==
Abdulaziz bin Abdullah founded the Centennial Fund in July 2004 and is the chairman of the Fund which is a nonprofit organization with the goal of supporting the Saudi business. He is also one of the members of the KAUST Board of Trustees. Delano Roosevelt, who is a grandson of Franklin D. Roosevelt, and Prince Abdulaziz jointly established the Friends of Saudi Arabia. This organization seeks to foster the friendly relations between Saudi Arabia and the United States. Prince Abdulaziz is also chairman of the board of trustees of Custodian of the Two Holy Mosques King Abdullah bin Abdulaziz International Award for Translation.

Abdulaziz bin Abdullah is one of three members of the Allegiance Council who did not support the appointment of Mohammad bin Salman as crown prince on 21 June 2017. The others were Muhammad bin Saad Al Saud and Ahmed bin Abdulaziz Al Saud. Abdulaziz represented his older brother, Khalid bin Abdullah, when the opinions of the council members were asked.

== Personal life ==
Abdulaziz bin Abdullah is married and has four children, three from his previous marriage to Abeer bint Turki bin Nasser, and one from Nathalie Ghassan Maamary.
