= Georgia's 175th House of Representatives district =

State district in Georgia, USA

Georgia's 175th State House of Representatives district
Representative
John LaHood; R–Valdosta
- Demographics: 66.7% White; 24.9% Black; 4.6% Hispanic; 2.2% Asian
- Population: 54,525

District 175 elects one member of the Georgia House of Representatives. It contains the entirety of Brooks County, as well as parts of Lowndes County.

== Members ==
- Amy Carter (2007–2017)
- John LaHood (since 2018)
