= Émile Lahoud =

President of Lebanon from 1998 to 2007

His Excellency Émile Lahoud OM, ONC
- إميل لحود
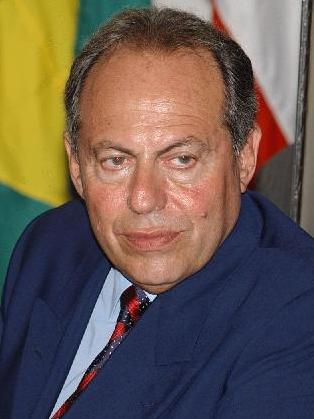
- Lahoud in 2004

11th President of Lebanon
- In office 24 November 1998 – 24 November 2007
- Prime Minister: Rafic Hariri; Selim Hoss; Rafic Hariri; Omar Karami; Najib Mikati; Fouad Siniora
- Preceded by: Elias Hrawi
- Succeeded by: Michel Suleiman

11th Commander of the Lebanese Armed Forces
- In office 28 November 1989 – 23 November 1998
- Preceded by: Michel Aoun
- Succeeded by: Michel Suleiman

Personal details
- Born: Émile Jamil Lahoud; 12 January 1936 (age 90) Baabdat, Matn, French Lebanon
- Party: Independent
- Spouse: Andrée Amadouni (m. 1967)
- Children: 3, including Emile Jr.
- Parent: Jamil Lahoud (father)
- Relatives: see Lahoud
- Education: Britannia Royal Naval College; Naval War College
- Religion: Maronite

Military service
- Allegiance: Lebanon
- Branch/service: Lebanese Navy; Lebanese Army
- Years of service: 1956–1980 (Navy); 1980–1998 (Army)
- Rank: General
- Commands: Commander of the Lebanese Armed Forces
- Battles/wars: Lebanese Civil War

Émile Jamil Lahoud (Arabic: إميل جميل لحود, romanized: Imīl Jamīl Laḥūd; born 12 January 1936) is a Lebanese politician who served as the 11th president of Lebanon from 1998 to 2007. During his presidency, the Israeli occupation of Southern Lebanon, that had lasted since 1982, ended in May 2000. He downplayed sectarianism and rearmed the Lebanese army, with help from Syria. Lahoud was closely allied to Syrian president Bashar al-Assad during the Syrian occupation of Lebanon, and was seen as playing a key role in preserving the occupation.

== Early life ==
Émile Lahoud was born in Baabdat on 12 January 1936. However, his birthplace is given as Beirut by the Armed Forces. He is the youngest son of General and former minister Jamil Lahoud. His mother, Andrenee Bajakian, is of Armenian descent from the Armenian-populated village of Kesab in Syria. Lahoud's older brother, Nasri Lahoud, was a judge who served as the military prosecutor general. Émile Lahoud is the nephew of Salim Lahoud who served as Lebanese foreign minister from 1955 to 1957.

Émile Lahoud is the great-grandson of Takouhi Kalebjian and Minas Sagerian on his maternal side who were from Adabazar, Ottoman Empire (now Adapazarı, Republic of Turkey). Adabazar is located about 50 miles (80 kilometers) outside Istanbul on the Black Sea. Both Minas and Takouhi were massacred during the Armenian genocide which occurred under the rule of the Ottoman Empire during World War I.

in 2001, Lahoud visited Armenia. In his short working visit, he found time to walk around Yerevan and visit Tsitsernakaberd, the Armenian Genocide memorial complex, and laid a wreath at the eternal flame in the memory of the victims.

Lahoud received his elementary education at the Collège de la Sagesse, in Beirut, and his secondary education at Brummana High School in north Metn. He entered the military academy as a naval cadet in 1956 and studied there for one year. He then attended Dartmouth Naval College in the United Kingdom. He returned to the Lebanese military academy and graduated later as an ensign. In 1986, he took a navy engineering course at the Naval Engineering Academy in the United Kingdom. As a captain, he attended the U.S. Naval War College, in Newport, Rhode Island, graduating in 1973.

== Military life ==
Lahoud became lieutenant junior grade on 18 September 1962 and lieutenant on 1 April 1969. He was promoted to lieutenant commander on 1 January 1974 and to commander on 1 January 1976. He then began to serve as a Navy Engineer Staff Captain from 1 January 1980 and as a Navy Engineer Staff Rear Admiral from 1 January 1985. On 28 November 1989, he was promoted to Major Lieutenant General.

Although he was trained as a naval officer, Lahoud benefited from the appointment of his maternal cousin, General Jean Njeim, as army commander and was appointed to head the transportation section of the army's fourth division in 1970. Although Njeim died in a helicopter crash in 1971, Lahoud steadily rose through the ranks of its officer corps. In 1980, he was appointed Director of Personnel in the Army Command. In 1983, he was given an administrative position at the Defense Ministry, where he was responsible for coordination between ministry officials and the Commander of the Lebanese Army, a position which was held by Michel Aoun in 1984.

In 1989, Lahoud was appointed to the post of Commander in chief of the army as part of Elias Hraoui's Western and Arab backed government in West Beirut. As part of the Taef agreement – to extend the authority of the new Lebanese government in Lebanese Forces controlled areas – Lahoud sent General Elie Hayek to take control of Mount Lebanon North of Baabda. During his career as chief of the LAF, Lahoud allowed Lebanese's security-military apparatus to be firmly controlled by Syria.

== Political career ==
Lahoud ran for the presidency in 1998 after having amended the constitution to allow the army commander-in-chief to run for office. This amendment is believed to have been backed by Syria. His presidency was secured following the receipt of 118 votes from the 128-member Lebanese Parliament. When he became Lebanon's president in 1998, he aligned himself with Hezbollah, and picked his own man as prime minister, Selim al-Hoss. This led to heightened tensions between Rafiq Hariri and Lahoud. The other significant move Lahoud made shortly after his presidency was a request that Syria remove Ghazi Kanaan, who was serving as Syria's intelligence chief in Lebanon. Lahoud's request was not granted.

During his term, Lahoud exerted more control over government decision-making than Prime Minister Rafiq Hariri or Parliament Speaker Nabih Berri. In August 2001, he modified the limits on the executive authority of the presidency stipulated in the 1989 Ta'if Accord and ordered security forces to launch a massive arrest sweep against nationalist dissidents without informing Hariri and other cabinet ministers.

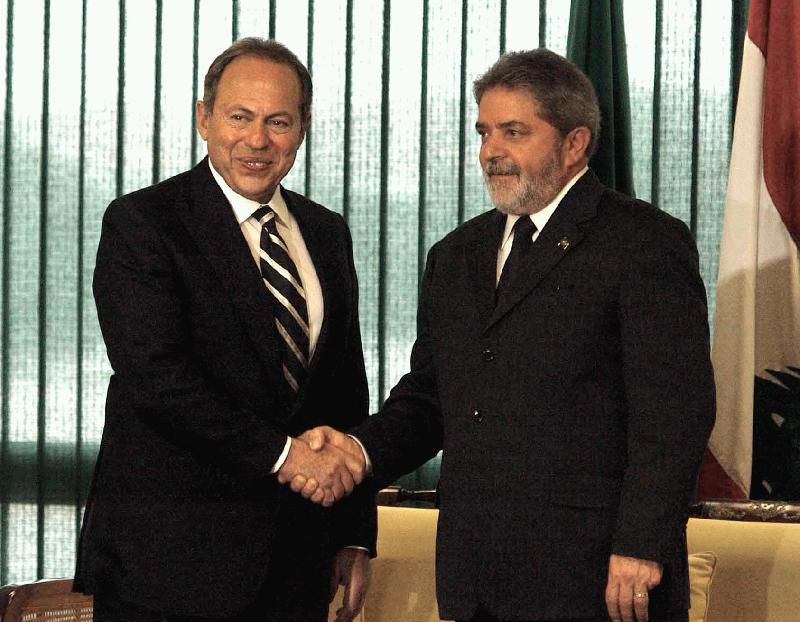
Lahoud meets with Brazilian President Luiz Inácio Lula da Silva in Brasília, 17 February 2004

In 2004, his six-year presidential term was supposed to end. Syria, however, although initially hesitant about Lahoud's candidacy, encouraged the extension of his term for three more years, regarding him as key to their control over Lebanon. The extension would be possible only if the constitution was amended. The Syrian leadership was reported to have threatened Hariri and others into endorsing the amendment. The intention to extend Lahoud's term prompted significant domestic turmoil. Ultimately, Hariri and the parliamentary majority voted for the extension of Lahoud's presidential term until November 2007, with 96 deputies voting in favor of the amendment against 29 who were opposed. However, four cabinet members resigned from office on 7 September 2004 in protest of the amendment: economy minister Marwan Hamadeh, culture minister Ghazi Aridi, environment minister Farès Boueiz and refugee affairs minister Abdullah Farhat.

On the other hand, both the Iranian government and Hezbollah viewed the extension of his term as a desirable development: Iranian president Mohammad Khatami telephoned his congratulations to Lahoud, and a delegation of top Hezbollah officials visited Lahoud to convey Nasrallah's congratulations. The extension of Lahoud's term is seen as a clear example of Syria's control of Lebanese politics.

In a 2006 Der Spiegel interview, Lahoud argued that Hezbollah enjoys prestige in Lebanon, because it "freed our country". He further stated that although Hezbollah is a small-scale organization, it stands up to Israel and voiced his respect for Hezbollah leader Hassan Nasrallah.

In 2007, his presidential term ended, but a new president was not immediately elected. Following a political deadlock which lasted for six months, the Lebanese parliament elected former army chief Michel Suleiman as president.

It was claimed that Lahoud spent much of his presidency term swimming and sunbathing at the Yarzeh Country Club minutes away from the presidential palace. Although there were high expectations from his own Christian Maronite community and the support of the military which he had commanded in the post-war period, the unpopular Lahoud developed a reputation as a weak leader by some, largely due to following Syria on most matters. In line with these views, Druze leader Walid Jumblatt publicly described Lahoud as a "helpless ghost" regarding his presidency.

== Personal life ==
He married Andrée Amadouni in 1967 and they have three children: Karine (born 1969), the former spouse of Elias Murr, Emile (born 1975) and Ralph (born 1977).

The book Years of Resistance: The Mandate of Emile Lahood, the Former President of Lebanon by Karim Pakradouni, published in May 2012, reviews his political life and his impact on the contemporary history of Lebanon and the Middle East crisis.

== Honours ==
=== National honours ===
- The Medal of 31 December 1961
- Order of Merit (3rd Grade) (1971)
- Navy Medal (Excellent Grade) (1974)
- Order of Merit (2nd Grade) (1983)
- National Order of the Cedar (Knight) (1983)
- Order of Merit (1st Grade) (1988)
- National Order of the Cedar (Officer) (1989)
- War Medal, 1991 War Medal (1992)
- National Order of the Cedar (Grand Cordon) (1993)
- Medal of the "Dawn of the South" (1993)
- The Medal of National Unity (1993)
- Military Valor Medal (1994)
- State Security Medal (1994)
- Order of Merit (Extraordinary Grade) (1998)

=== Foreign honours ===
- Haiti : Medal of Merit and Honor (High Ranking Officer) (1974)
- Romania : Tudor Vladimirescu Medal (4th degree) (1974), The "Star of Romania" Collar (2001)
- France : Commander of the Legion of Honor (1996), Grand Cross of the Legion of Honor (2001)
- Italy : Order of Merit (Senior Officer Rank) (1997)
- Argentina : Great Cross of Argentina (1998)
- Jordan : Order of Al-Hussein bin Ali (1999)
- Qatar : Great Collar of Independence (1999)
- Armenia : Order of St. Mesrop Mashtots (2000)
- Saudi Arabia : Order of King Abdulaziz (2000)
- United Arab Emirates : Great Collar of The Union (2000)
- Kuwait : Great Collar of Mubarak (2000)
- Egypt : Great Collar of the Nile (2000)
- Bahrain : Collar of the Order of Khalifa (2000)
- Slovakia : Order of the White Double Cross (1st Class) (2001)
- Morocco : Order of Muhammad (Extraordinary Grade) (2001)
- Tunisia : Order of November the 7th (highest Grade) (2001)
- Monaco : Grand Cross of the Order of Grimaldi (13 July 2001)
- Greece : Grand Cross of the Order of the Redeemer (2001)
- Syria : Order of the Umayyads – Grand Cordon (2002)
- Ukraine : Badge of the Order of Prince Yaroslav the Wise – 1st class (2002)
- Cyprus : Grand Collar of the Order of Makarios III (2002)
- Algeria : Order of the Athir (23 July 2002)
- Yemen : Order of the Republic (2002)
- Oman : Military Order of Oman – first category (2002)
- Bulgaria : The Order Stara Planina (2003)
- Gold Olympic Order (2003)
- Brazil : National Order of the Southern Cross, Brasilia (2004), Big Cross of the Ipiranga Order, São Paulo (2004)
- Hungary : Order of Merit – Grand Cross with Chain (2004)
- Knight Grand Cross of Merit with Gold Star of the Sacred Military Constantinian Order of Saint George (2004), Knight Grand Cross of Merit with Gold Plate of the Sacred Military Constantinian Order of Saint George (2005)
- Poland : Grand Cross of the Order of Merit (2004)
- Order of the Federation – 1st Class (Cordon), Arab Military Sports Federation (2005)

Military offices
Preceded by Michel Aoun	Commander of the Lebanese Armed Forces; 1989–1998	Succeeded by Michel Suleiman
Political offices
Preceded by Elias Hrawi	President of Lebanon; 1998–2007	Succeeded by Fouad Siniora; Acting
