= Mourad Benmehidi =

Algerian diplomat

H.E. Mourad Benmehidi
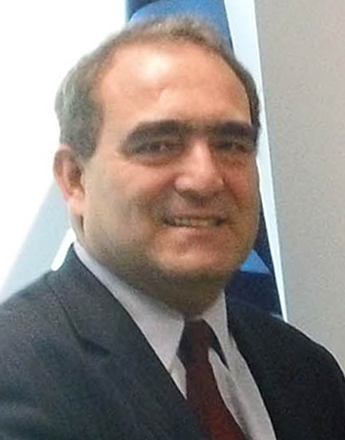

Permanent Representative to the UN for Algeria
- Incumbent
- Assumed office August 2008
- Preceded by: Youcef Yousfi

Personal details
- Born: 1 February 1953 (age 73) Annaba, Algeria

Mourad Benmehidi (born 1 February 1953 in Annaba, Algeria) was the Permanent Representative to the United Nations for Algeria. He took office in August 2008. Benmehidi is married with three children.

== Education ==
Benmehidi received a law degree at the University of Algiers. He speaks four languages which include Arabic, English, French and German.

== Career ==
Benmehidi was Algeria's Deputy Permanent Representative to the United Nations in New York, prior to taking the lead post. He has held several other diplomatic posts which include Minister Counselor at Algeria's Mission to the United Nations; Foreign Ministry of Algeria: acting Deputy Director for Eastern Asia, Deputy Director responsible for Northern Europe, and Head of Human Rights at the Ministry of Foreign Affairs; postings at Algerian Embassies in Bonn, Germany and in Harare, Zimbabwe. He began his diplomatic career at the Foreign Ministry in 1982, in charge of the Office of South-South Cooperation and Regional and Inter-regional Conferences.

== See also ==
- List of current permanent representatives to the United Nations
