= Yolande Labaki =

Lebanese painter (born 1927)

- Born: 1927 (age 98–99); Lebanon
- Known for: landscape painting
- Awards: www.yolandelabaki-gallery.com

Yolande Labaki (born 1927) is a Lebanese artist and landscape painter.

== Life ==
Born in 1927, Yolande Labaki began her studies in Paris in literature and art history, after which she began her painting career. Self-taught in the field, she was mentored by Florent Crommelynck. She studied in New York at the School of Visual Arts, working in the silkscreen techniques.

Labaki exhibits in Frankfurt, Aachen, Düsseldorf and Beirut, as well as part of group exhibitions. She also participated in Lebanon - the Look of the painters - 200 years of Lebanese painting in Paris, at the Institut du monde arabe. Solo exhibitions of her works in 1974 at the Palace of Fine Arts in Brussels, 1989 Kulturzentrum of Kaslik in Lebanon and in the same year at the Ukrainian Institute of New York.
