= John LaHood =

American politician

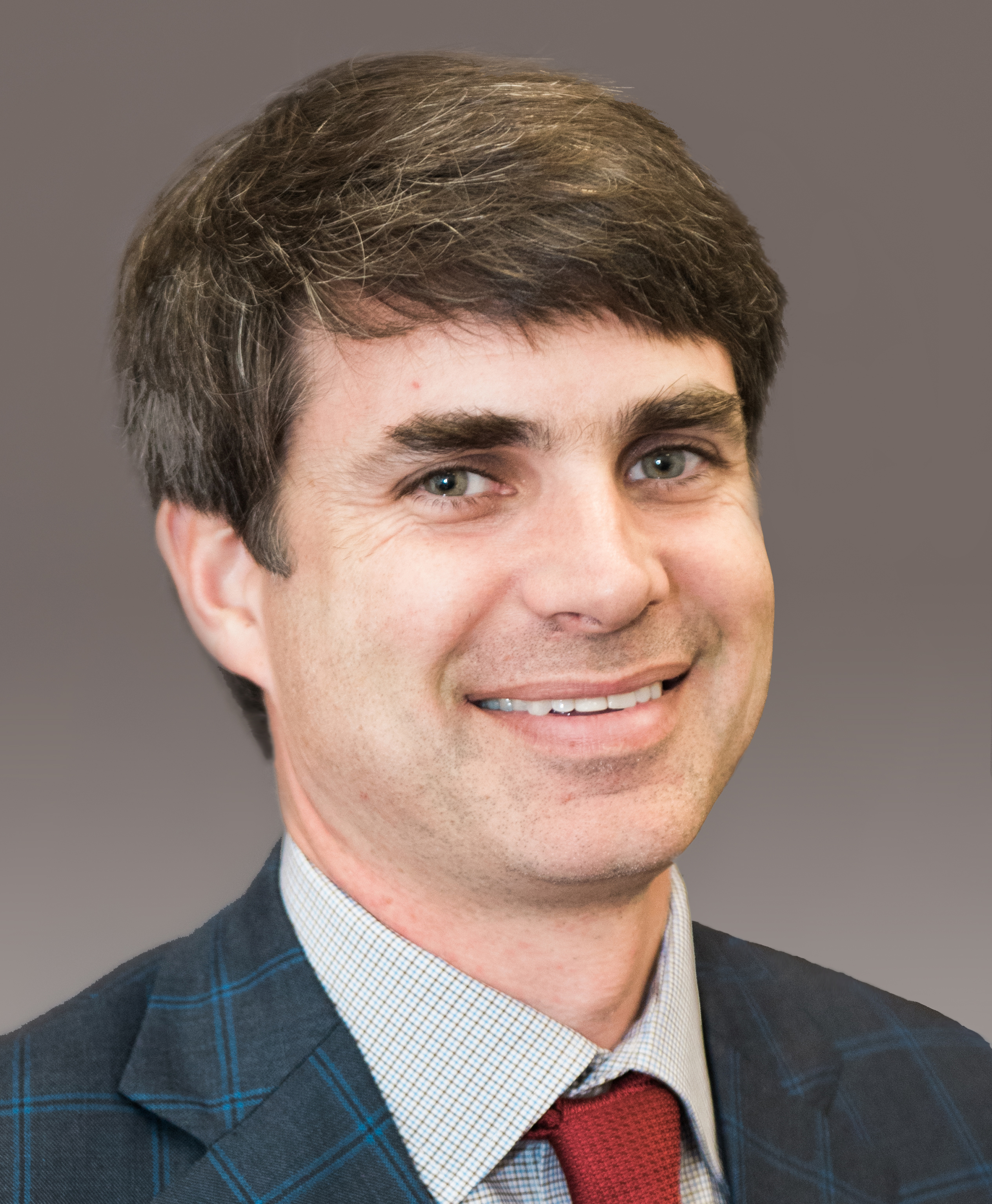
- Official headshot

Member of the Georgia House of Representatives from the 175th district
- Incumbent
- Assumed office February 19, 2018
- Preceded by: Amy Carter

Personal details
- Born: George John LaHood; January 22, 1979 (age 47)
- Party: Republican
- Spouse: Crystal

George John LaHood (born January 22, 1979) is an American politician from Georgia. LaHood is a Republican member of Georgia House of Representatives for District 175.
