= Jamil Lahoud =

Lebanese general and politician

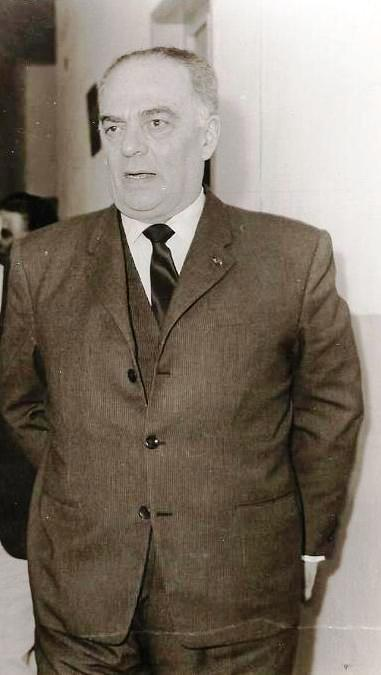
Jamil Lahoud

Jamil Lahoud (Arabic: جميل لحود, romanized: Jamīl Laḥūd; 1901–1983) was a Lebanese general and politician.

== Career ==
Born in Baabdat, Mount Lebanon, Lahoud was a key figure in Lebanon's independence movement, being the first to raise the Lebanese independence flag in 1943 at Falougha. He played a significant role in the founding of the Lebanese Army after the French mandate ended. He was one of the generals who prepared a coup against Camille Chamoun before the American intervention during the 1958 Lebanon crisis. Lahoud retired as a general in 1960.

In politics, he was elected to the Lebanese Parliament in 1960 and 1964, representing North Metn. He held the position of Minister of Labor and Social Affairs in 1966. He was known as the "Red General" due to his leftist views and his support for the ideas of Kamal Jumblatt. He was among the candidates during the presidential elections in 1970.

Lahoud was close friends with General Fouad Chehab, the third President of Lebanon. He was married to Adrenee Bajakian, with whom he had two children: Nasri Lahoud (a diplomat and judge) and Émile Lahoud (President of Lebanon from 1998 to 2007).

== Sources ==
- Barak, Oren (2009). The Lebanese Army: A National Institution in a Divided Society. State University of New York Press. ISBN 9780791493632.
- East, Roger; Thomas, Richard J. (2014). Profiles of People in Power: The World's Government Leaders. Taylor & Francis. ISBN 9781317639404.
- Winslow, Charles (1996). Lebanon: War and Politics in a Fragmented Society. Routledge.
