= List of legislative committees of Georgia =

The Georgia General Assembly is the state legislature of the U.S. state of Georgia. It is bicameral, consisting of the Senate and the House of Representatives. 68 seated committees are operated: 29 senate committees, 37 house committees, and 2 joint committees. The following list shows these committees as of 2013:

== Joint legislative committees ==
- Legislative Services
- MARTOC- Metropolitan Atlanta Rapid Transit Overview Committee. Provides oversight of the Metropolitan Atlanta Rapid Transit Authority (MARTA).

== Senate committees ==
- Administrative Affairs
- Agriculture and Consumer Affairs
- Appropriations
- Assignments
- Banking and Financial Institutions
- Economic Development
- Education and Youth
- Ethics
- Finance
- Government Oversight
- Health and Human Services
- Higher Education
- Insurance and Labor
- Interstate Cooperation
- Judiciary
- Judiciary Non-Civil
- Natural Resources and the Environment
- Public Safety
- Reapportionment and Redistricting
- Regulated Industries and Utilities
- Retirement
- Rules
- Science and Technology
- Special Judiciary
- State and Local Governmental Operations
- State Institutions and Property
- Transportation
- Urban Affairs
- Veterans, Military and Homeland Security

== House committees ==
- Agriculture & Consumer Affairs
- Appropriations
- Banks & Banking
- Budget and Fiscal Affairs Oversight
- Code Revision
- Defense & Veterans Affairs
- Economic Development & Tourism
- Education
- Energy, Utilities & Telecommunications
- Ethics
- Game, Fish, & Parks
- Governmental Affairs
- Health & Human Services
- Higher Education
- Human Relations & Aging
- Industry and Labor
- Information and Audits
- Insurance
- Interstate Cooperation
- Intragovernmental Coordination
- Judiciary
- Judiciary Non-Civil
- Juvenile Justice
- Legislative & Congressional Reapportionment
- Motor Vehicles
- Natural Resources & Environment
- Public Safety and Homeland Security
- Regulated Industries
- Retirement
- Rules
- Science and Technology
- Small Business Development
- Special Rules
- State Planning & Community Affairs
- State Properties
- Transportation
- Ways & Means

== See also ==
- List of United States state legislatures
