= Carmen Labaki =

Lebanese/Brazilian movie director and producer

Carmen Labaki كارمن لبكي
- Born: 1971 (age 54–55); Beirut, Lebanon
- Occupations: Film director, producer
- Website: www.carmenlabaki.com

Carmen Labaki (in Arabic كارمن لبكي) (born in Beirut, Lebanon in 1971) is a Lebanese–Brazilian movie director and producer. Carmen Labaki was born in Beirut. She is the winner of the Best Documentary Film Award 2005 at the Arpa International Film Festival in Hollywood, run by Arpa Foundation for Film, Music and Art for Labaki directing and producing Armenians of Lebanon about the Armenian community in Lebanon.

== Career ==
Besides Armenians of Lebanon (in Arabic أرمن لبنان), the dual Lebanese and Brazilian national is also the producer and director of many other documentaries including:

- I Knocked on the Temple's Door, a 2011 documentary about the Freemasons
- My Name is Aram, a docudrama produced in 2006, relating the story of Aram Tcholakian, a survivor of the Armenian genocide
- Armenia, the Sleeping Beauty, a tourist film produced in 2004, revealing the unknown richness of the newborn Armenia
- France in Lebanon, a documentary featuring the close historical ties between Lebanon and France. The documentary film was selected by Le Sommet de la Francophonie as part of the cultural program running in parallel with the Francophony international event which took place in Beirut, Lebanon in October 2002.
- Brazil in Lebanon produced in 1997, telling the story of the Lebanese who immigrated to Brazil around 100 years ago. Some Lebanese Brazilians come back to visit Lebanon with a lot of emotion and still maintain tight bonds with the "land of their ancestors".

Carmen took part in casting candidates for Star Academy France and Star Academy Lebanon, and collaborated with the Middle East Broadcasting Center (MBC) in casting candidates for various worldwide renowned programs in their Middle Eastern edition (like syndicated "Biggest Loser", "World's Apart" and others) and directing the programs.

For three years, she was the news producer at the Lebanese Broadcasting Corporation International (LBCI).

She has also directed

- Fendi Fashion Show in China 2007: Reportage on a fashion show that took place at the Great Wall of China with Sylvia Fendi and Karl Lagerfeld.
- Miss Lebanon event in Malaysia 2007 reportage covering the humanitarian activities of Miss Lebanon 2007 in Lebanon and Malaysia. It was supported by financial support from the Malaysian authorities.
- Miss Universe in Mexico 2007: Reportage about the activities of Miss Lebanon 2007 during Miss Universe event
- Byblos Bank 2006 - Report promoting Byblos Bank financial and banking activities
- Boghossian Association in Armenia 2006 - Report on social and educational activities of the association
- Clip commemorating the 90th anniversary of the Armenian genocide of 1915. The film produced by the Armenian Committee for the Genocide in 2005 was broadcast by LBCI (Lebanese Broadcasting Corporation International).
- World's Apart shot in Mongolia 2005. Two Middle Eastern episodes produced and broadcast by Middle East Broadcasting Center (MBC).
- Promotional materials covering festival shows including "Montserrat Caballe", "Le Ballet de Bolchoi", "Missia", "Majida Roumi" etc.
- Documentary on the region of Ras El Khaimeh in the United Arab Emirates in 2008

At present, she is directing Sawtna (meaning "Our Voice"), a UNICEF-financed TV program, supported by the Netherlands Government, putting ahead the youth's opinions about social, political and economical issues. Sawtna is shown weekly on Lebanese Broadcasting Corporation International (LBCI) since 2006.

Concurrently, she is the producer in Lebanon for Publicis Graphics (Saudi Arabia - Riyadh) and has her own Film Production House "LUMENS".
