= Salim Lahoud =

Lebanese Maronite Christian political figure

- سليم لحود

Minister of Foreign Affairs and National Defense

Personal details
- Born: 1910
- Died: 1971 (aged 60–61)
- Spouse: Nadia Yared
- Children: Nassib, Samir
- Occupation: Politician, minister

Salim Nassib Lahoud (1910–1971) was a Lebanese Maronite Christian political figure who was a Member of Parliament and Minister of Foreign Affairs and National Defense of Lebanon in the 1950s among other ministerial posts.

Lahoud was the father of Lebanese Ambassador to the U.S.A., Member of Parliament and Minister of State H.E Nassib Lahoud. He is part of the Lahoud family, one of the most prominent Lebanese-Christian political families (See List of political families).

Lahoud was elected to the Lebanese Parliament in 1952, 1956, 1960, and 1968 as an ally of the National Liberal Party of president Camille Chamoun. Lahoud held various ministerial posts including Minister of Foreign Affairs, Minister of Defense and Minister of Public works of the Republic of Lebanon.

He was married to Nadia Lahoud, née Yared. They had 2 sons; Samir and Nassib Lahoud.

== Background ==
Lebanon is governed through a multi-confessional political system where since the 1990 Taef accord the presidency is earmarked for a Maronite Christian, the post of PM for a Sunni Muslim and the post of Parliament speaker for a Shia Muslim.

Before 1990, as Lebanon has historically been a country with a large majority of Christians, most political posts were occupied by Maronite Christians. Population trends as well as emigration (to Brazil, Argentina, USA, Canada, Europe, Australia) has since changed the social fabric drastically.
