= HMS Sheffield (C24) =

Town-class cruiser of the Royal Navy

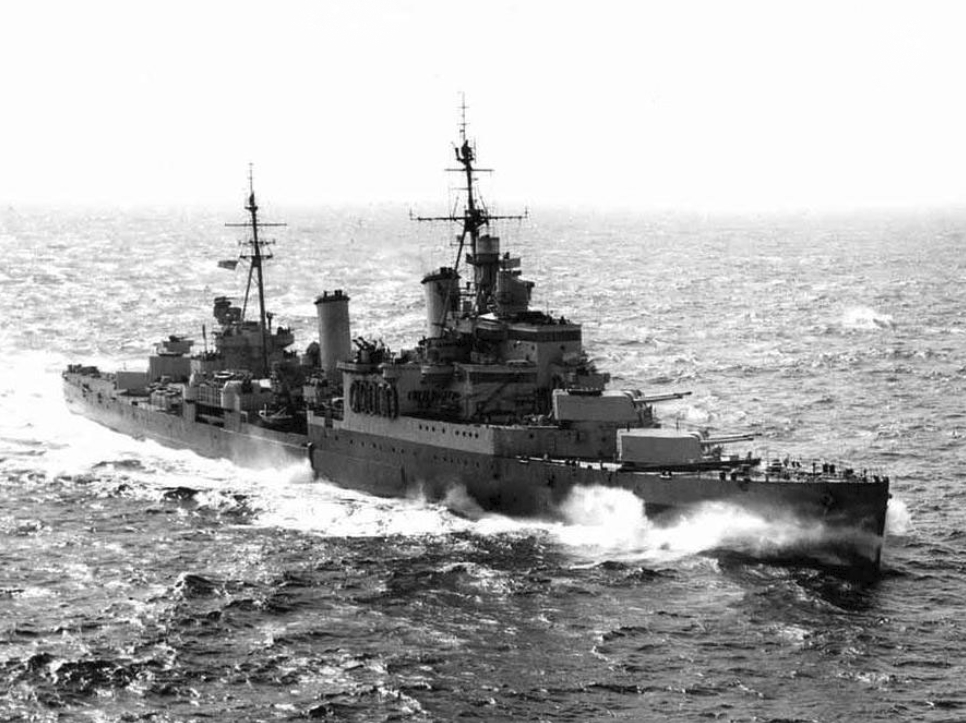
- Sheffield underway in 1944

History

United Kingdom
- Name: Sheffield
- Namesake: Sheffield
- Builder: Vickers-Armstrongs, High Walker
- Yard number: 5
- Laid down: 31 January 1935
- Launched: 23 July 1936
- Commissioned: 25 August 1937
- Identification: Pennant number: 24, from 1948: C24
- Motto: "Deo adjuvante proficio"; Latin: "With God's help I advance"
- Nickname(s): Shiny Sheff
- Honours and awards: Norway 1940; Spartivento 1940; Atlantic 1941–43; Bismarck Action 1941; Mediterranean 1941; Malta convoys 1941; Arctic 1941–43; North Africa 1942; Barents Sea 1942; Biscay 1943; Salerno 1943; North Cape 1943
- Fate: Scrapped at Faslane, 1967
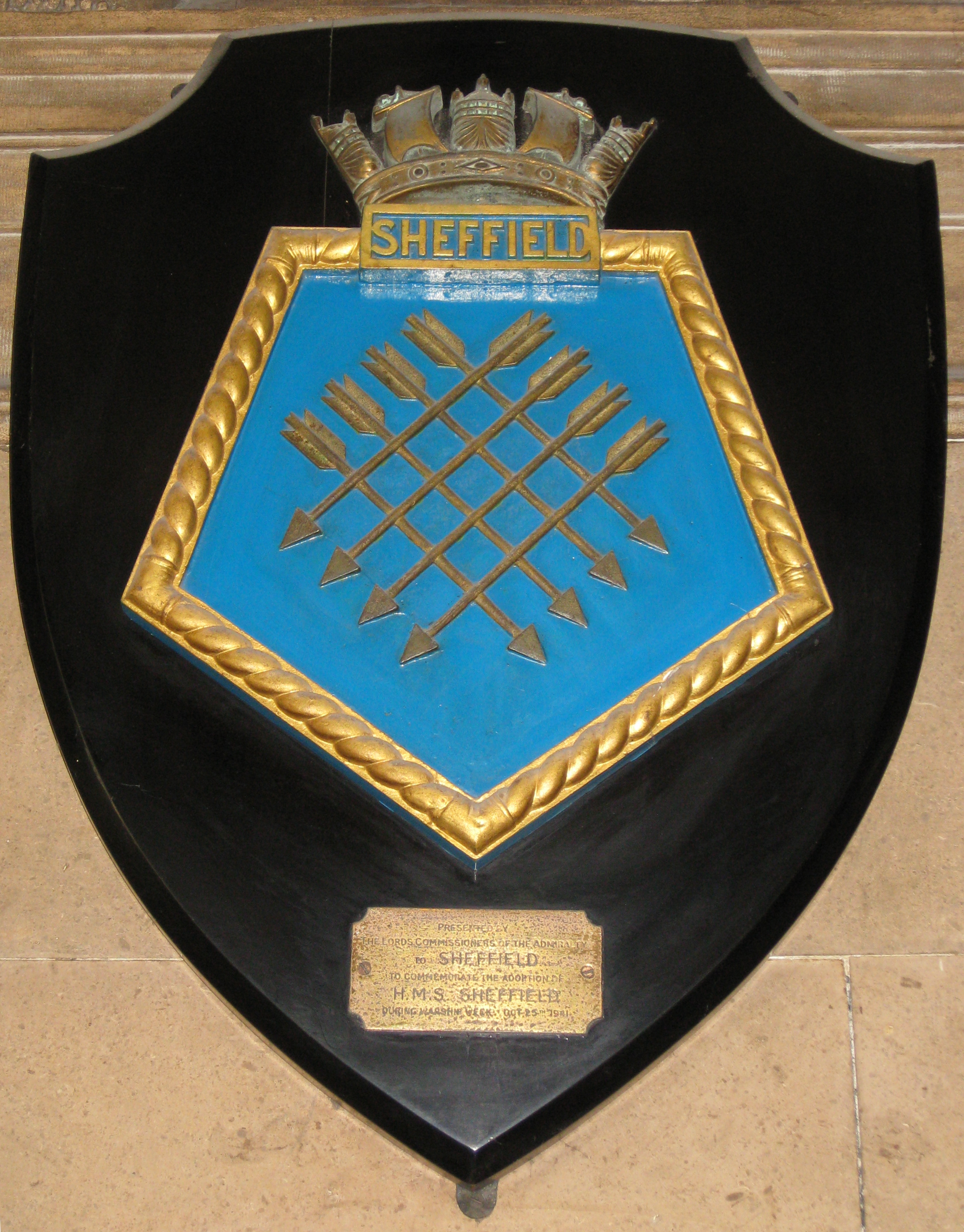
- Badge

General characteristics
- Class & type: Town-class light cruiser
- Displacement: 9,100 long tons (9,200 t) (standard); 11,350 long tons (11,530 t) (full load)
- Length: 591 ft (180.1 m) (overall)
- Beam: 62 ft 3 in (19 m)
- Draught: 17 ft (5.2 m)
- Installed power: 4 Admiralty 3-drum boilers; 75,000 shp (56,000 kW)
- Propulsion: 4 screws; 4 geared steam turbines
- Speed: 32 knots (59 km/h; 37 mph)
- Range: 7,000 nmi (13,000 km; 8,100 mi) at 16 knots (30 km/h; 18 mph)
- Complement: 748
- Sensors & processing systems: 1938: Type 79Y radar; 1940: Type 279 radar; 1942: Type 273, 281, 282, 283, 284 and 285 radars
- Armament: Original configuration: 4 × triple 6 in (152 mm) guns; 4 × twin QF 4 in (102 mm) DP guns; 2 × quadruple QF 2 pdr (1.6 in (40 mm)) AA guns; 2 × quadruple 0.5 in (12.7 mm) AA machine guns; 2 × triple 21 in (533 mm) Torpedo tubes; After 1944 refit; 3 × triple 6 in (152 mm) guns; 4 × twin 4 in (102 mm) DP guns; 2 × quadruple QF 2 pdr (1.6 in (40 mm)) AA guns; 4 quadruple 40 mm AA guns; 10 twin and 6 single 20 mm AA guns; 2 × triple 21 in (533 mm) Torpedo tubes
- Armour: Belt: 4.5 in (114 mm); Turrets: 1–2 in (25–51 mm); Deck: 1.25–2 in (32–51 mm)
- Aircraft carried: 3
- Aviation facilities: 1 fixed catapult

HMS Sheffield was the third of ten Town-class light cruisers of the Royal Navy. The ship was laid down in January 1935, launched in July 1936, and commissioned in August 1937. She was active in all major naval European theatres of the Second World War, in the Atlantic Ocean, the Mediterranean Sea and the Arctic Ocean.

Her career started with service in the Home Fleet, which took her on patrols against German blockade runners and on actions during the Norwegian Campaign. In August 1940, Sheffield was transferred to Force H stationed in Gibraltar. During her service with Force H, most of the operations involved either ferrying aircraft or escorting convoys to Malta. Sheffield also operated against German surface raiders in the Atlantic, and took part in the chase for the German battleship Bismarck. On 26 May 1941, she directed torpedo bombers from the aircraft carrier Ark Royal to Bismarck, but took no part in the sinking of Bismarck one day later.

In January 1942, Sheffield was assigned to the escort of Arctic convoys to Northern Russia; in March, she was damaged by a mine and needed four months' repair. In September, Sheffield went back to the Arctic, but in October Arctic convoys were suspended in preparation for Operation Torch. The cruiser participated in Operation Torch as part of the Eastern Task Force, which covered the landings at Algiers. Arctic convoys resumed in December 1942, and Sheffield went back to the Arctic. In that same month, she was part of a cruiser force that repelled a German attack on Convoy JW 51B in the Battle of the Barents Sea. During the battle, Sheffield damaged the German heavy cruiser Admiral Hipper and sank the destroyer Friedrich Eckoldt.

In March 1943, Arctic convoys were suspended once more, this time due to the threat of the German surface fleet stationed in Norway. Sheffield moved again to the Mediterranean and took part in Operation Avalanche. Arctic convoys were resumed in November when the threat of the German surface fleet was reduced after the disabling of the German battleship Tirpitz in September. In December 1943, during the Battle of the North Cape, Sheffield assisted in the sinking of the German battleship Scharnhorst whilst escorting Convoy JW 55B. Sheffield went in for an extended refit in 1944 and saw no more service during the war. She was placed in reserve for a first time in 1959, and after a short reactivation she was decommissioned in 1964 and finally scrapped in 1967.

== Characteristics ==
The Town-class light cruisers were designed as counters to the Japanese Mogami-class cruisers built during the early 1930s. Sheffield displaced 9,100 long tons (9,246 t) tons at standard load and 11,350 long tons (11,530 t) at deep load. The ship had an overall length of 591 ft 6 in (180.3 m), a beam of 61 ft 10 in (18.8 m) and a draught of 17 feet 7 inches (5.4 m). She was powered by four geared steam turbine sets, each driving one shaft, which developed a total of 75,000 shp (56,000 kW) and gave a maximum speed of 32 kn (59 km/h; 37 mph). The ship had a capacity of 1,970 long tons (2,000 t) of fuel oil as built, which provided a cruising radius of 7,000 nautical miles (13,000 km; 8,100 mi) at a speed of 16 knots (30 km/h; 18 mph). Vickers-Armstrongs built Sheffield at High Walker, Newcastle upon Tyne. Her keel was laid on 31 January 1935, she was launched on 23 July 1936 and she was completed on 25 August 1937. By 1942 the ship's complement was 796 officers and ratings.

Sheffield mounted twelve BL six-inch (152 mm) Mk XXIII guns in four triple-gun turrets. The turrets were designated 'A', 'B', 'X' and 'Y' from front to rear. The secondary armament consisted of eight QF four-inch (102 mm) Mk XVI dual-purpose guns in twin mounts. Their light anti-aircraft armament consisted of a pair of quadruple mounts for the two-pounder (40 mm) AA gun ("pom-pom") and two quadruple mounts for 0.5 in (12.7 mm) Vickers AA machine guns. By 1942 the latter had been removed and replaced by nine Oerlikon 20 mm cannon in single mounts. The ship carried two above-water, triple mounts for 21 in (533 mm) torpedoes. Sheffield was protected by a 4.5-inch (114 mm) main armour belt, with deck armour varying between 1.25 and 2 inches (32 and 51 mm). The armour protecting the main gun turrets had a thickness of 1–2 in (25–51 mm). The Sheffield was equipped with a fixed catapult and could operate three aircraft.

The first operational Radar system was placed into service in August 1938 on the Sheffield. The Type 79Y was an air-warning radar, capable of detecting aircraft at 10,000 ft (3,000 m), 53 mi (85 km) away. In 1940 the set was replaced by a more powerful Type 279 air-warning radar, which could also be used as a barrage predictor for anti-aircraft fire with a range of 7 mi (11 km). By the end of 1942 Sheffield was equipped with a Type 273 surface search radar, a Type 281 air warning radar, Type 282 radars for the 2-pounder pom-pom anti-aircraft guns, Type 283 radar for automatic barrage firing for anti-aircraft fire by the main guns, Type 284 radar for surface target direction and Type 285 radar for the heavy anti-aircraft guns.

The anti-aircraft armament was continuously upgraded. During her 1944 refit Sheffield, like many contemporary British cruisers, had her 'X' turret removed to make space and save top weight for anti-aircraft guns. By 1945 her anti-aircraft defense was to consist of four quadruple Bofors 40 mm guns, ten double and six single Oerlikon 20 mm (0.79 in) cannons in addition to her existing armament of four-inch and two-pounder guns. After several refits in the 1950s, her final light anti-aircraft armament consisted of eight twin Bofors Mk 5 and two single Bofors Mk 7. Unlike most Royal Navy ships of her time, her fittings were constructed from stainless steel instead of the more traditional brass. This was an attempt to reduce the amount of cleaning required on the part of the crew. Her nickname, the "Shiny Sheff", stemmed from this.

== War service ==
Even before the outbreak of war, Sheffield was as part of the 18th Cruiser Squadron, together with the Home Fleet already patrolling the waters between Iceland, Scotland and Norway, in search for German merchant ships trying to reach home port before the declaration of war. From 6 to 10 September the light cruisers Sheffield and Aurora operated with the Home Fleet consisting of the battleships Rodney and Nelson and the battlecruiser Repulse with ten destroyers along the Norwegian coast against German blockade runners. Sheffield and Aurora were then transferred to the 2nd Cruiser Squadron together with the light cruisers Glasgow and Southampton. On 22 September the force sortied into the North Sea but the operation was abandoned when two of the escorting destroyers collided. Three days later the force sailed again, to cover the retreat of the damaged submarine Spearfish. This sortie marked the first occasion of using an air warning radar by naval forces when Sheffield detected nine German aircraft searching for the British force. On 8 October Sheffield and Aurora were deployed together with the battlecruisers Hood and Repulse as the "Humber Force" against a reported sortie of the German battleship Gneisenau, the light cruiser Köln and nine destroyers in the North Sea. The Germans retreated quickly and no battle ensued. On 21 October Sheffield intercepted and captured the 5,896 GRT German freighter Gloria.

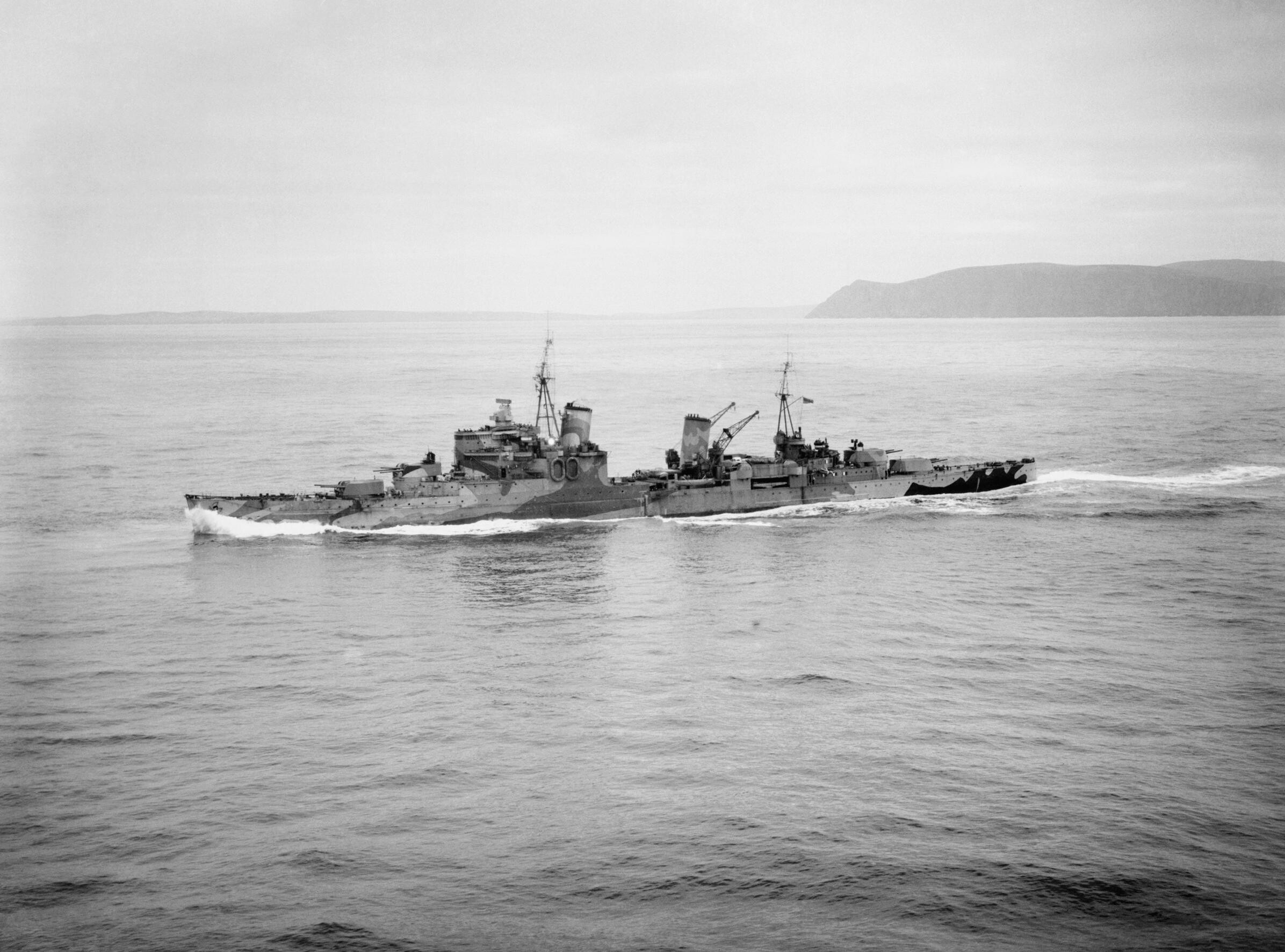
Sheffield underway near Scapa Flow.

Following the sinking of the armed merchant cruiser Rawalpindi by Scharnhorst and Gneisenau off Iceland on 23 November, Sheffield was ordered to set out from Loch Ewe with three destroyers to take part in the search for the German force. Sheffield took part in a tight cruiser patrol line that blocked the return path to Germany but the German ships took advantage of the heavy weather and broke through the patrol line undetected to return home. In April 1940, Sheffield had returned just in time from a refit to get involved in the Norwegian Campaign. When in the evening of 7 April news was received of a massive German naval operation, she set out from Scapa Flow as part of the Home Fleet under the command of Admiral Charles Forbes. On 9 April Forbes detached five cruisers including Sheffield and seven destroyers from the Home Fleet to attack the German forces at Bergen. The force had to abort its mission when attacked by 47 Junkers Ju 88 and 41 Heinkel He 111 bombers. The bombers sank the destroyer Gurkha and damaged two cruisers. On 14 April the cruiser was part of a covering force for the Allied Namsos campaign and on 23 April transferred part of the 15th Infantry Brigade for the Åndalsnes landings. The landings were not successful and in the night of 30 April Sheffield assisted in the evacuation of British troops from Åndalsnes and Molde. On 9 May, Sheffield sortied into the North Sea with the light cruiser Manchester to cover operations against a German mine-laying operation; when the German invasion of France started on 10 May, she was ordered south. During the Dunkirk evacuation, she was stationed with the 18th cruiser squadron in the Humber estuary.

=== Force H ===
After the surrender of France, the Royal Navy took over the control of the Western Mediterranean from France by stationing Force H (Vice admiral James Somerville) in Gibraltar on 27 June. In August 1940, Sheffield and the 8th Destroyer Flotilla joined Force H, which consisted further of the battlecruiser Renown and Ark Royal. On 7 November Force H executed Operation Coat, escorting reinforcements for the Mediterranean fleet in Alexandria from Gibraltar to Malta. Fairey Swordfish aircraft from Force H attacked Cagliari on 9 November. Italian bombers retaliated but obtained only near-misses. Before Force H returned to Gibraltar, three Fairey Fulmar fighter aircraft were flown off to Malta as reinforcements. In Operation White on 15 November Force H escorted the aircraft carrier Argus to a point West of Malta, where 12 Hawker Hurricanes were flown off at the extreme of their flight endurance. Only four aircraft made it to Malta due to unexpected head wind. On 24 November Sheffield sailed with Force H for Operation Collar, a supply convoy to Malta. The operation was detected by the Italians and the Italian fleet consisting of two battleships and six heavy cruisers, tried to intercept the convoy. During the inconclusive battle of Cape Spartivento both fleets bombarded each other at long distance and retreated. On 10 December Sheffield left Gibraltar again with Force H to meet and escort the battleship Malaya on transfer from Alexandria as reinforcement for Force H.

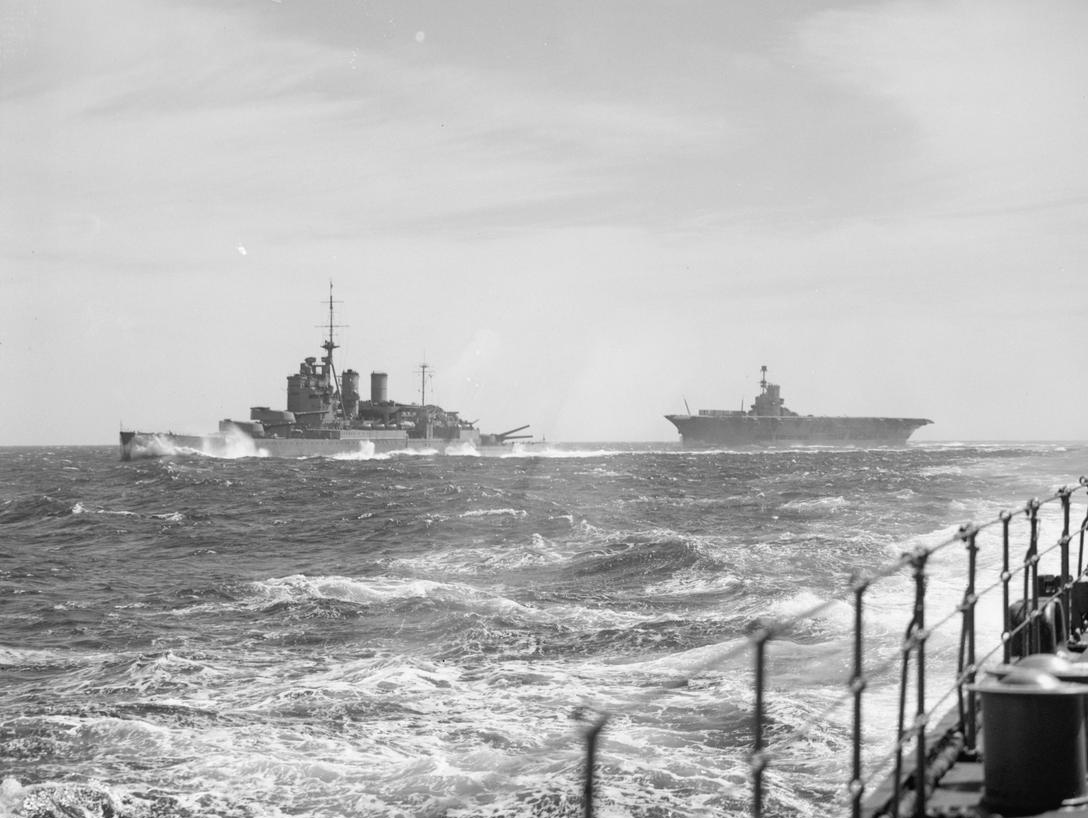
Force H: Renown and Ark Royal, seen from Sheffield.

During Operation Nordseetour, the German heavy cruiser Admiral Hipper attacked convoy WS 5A 25 in December. The convoy, destined for Gibraltar, was reinforced by Force H, who searched for the German raider. She was back in Gibraltar on 30 December. In Operation Excess, several Convoy WS 5A ships continued to Malta and Piraeus, and between 7 and 9 January 1941, Force H provided cover for the ships as far as Skerki Banks. An attack by ten Italian bombers was detected by Sheffield's radar at the maximum working distance of 43 nmi (80 km; 49 mi) and defences could be prepared in time to repulse the attack without loss. After Force H turned away, the escort of the convoy was taken over by the Mediterranean Fleet, which was attacked by Italian torpedo bombers and German dive bombers. In the following days these dive bombers sank Southampton, and damaged severely the aircraft carrier Illustrious.

Between 31 January and 4 February Force H launched an air strike against the Tirso dam in Sardinia, but a further planned attack on Genoa had to be abandoned because of bad weather. The operation against Genoa was repeated in Operation Grog between 6 and 11 February. Renown and Malaya fired 273 rounds of 15-inch shell into the harbour and Sheffield added 782 rounds of 6-inch but to not much effect; only five out of 55 ships in the harbour were sunk. This sortie left the Gibraltar convoys without cover, Admiral Hipper sailed unopposed towards Gibraltar and on 12 February attacked Convoy SLS 64 and sank seven ships. On 17 March Force H left Gibraltar for the Atlantic in search of Scharnhorst and Gneisenau, which were raiding in the North Atlantic. Aircraft of Ark Royal found in the morning of 20 March two tankers that were taken as prizes by the German battleships and which were scuttled by their prize crews on approach of surface units of Force H. In the afternoon the German battleships were sighted by a reconnaissance plane of Ark Royal but the German ships managed to escape during the night. Force H continued to search for the German ships after refueling in Gibraltar on 24 March, but after air reconnaissance reported the ships in the harbour of Brest, Force H put back to Gibraltar on 28 March.

Two days later, Sheffield and four destroyers were dispatched to check some Vichy French merchant vessels for contraband but the ships escaped being boarded when they reached the cover of coastal batteries at Nemours. During April, Sheffield participated with Force H in two more aircraft transfer runs to Malta: In Operation Winch twelve Hurricanes were flown off to Malta on 3 April and twenty more were delivered during Operation Dunlop on 24 April. Operation Tiger involved two supply convoys from Alexandria to Malta, whilst from Gibraltar a convoy was to sail through the Mediterranean to Alexandria, instead of going round the Cape, in order to deliver 295 tanks and 53 aircraft which were urgently needed for the upcoming Operation Battleaxe. Force H with Sheffield escorted the convoy until Skerki Banks. They were attacked on 8 May by Italian Savoia-Marchetti SM.79 Sparviero torpedo bombers and German Junkers Ju 87 dive bombers with fighter escort, but none of the ships suffered any damage. Between 19 and 22 May Sheffield sortied once more with Force H together with the aircraft carrier Furious in Operation Splice to fly 48 Hurricane fighters to Malta.

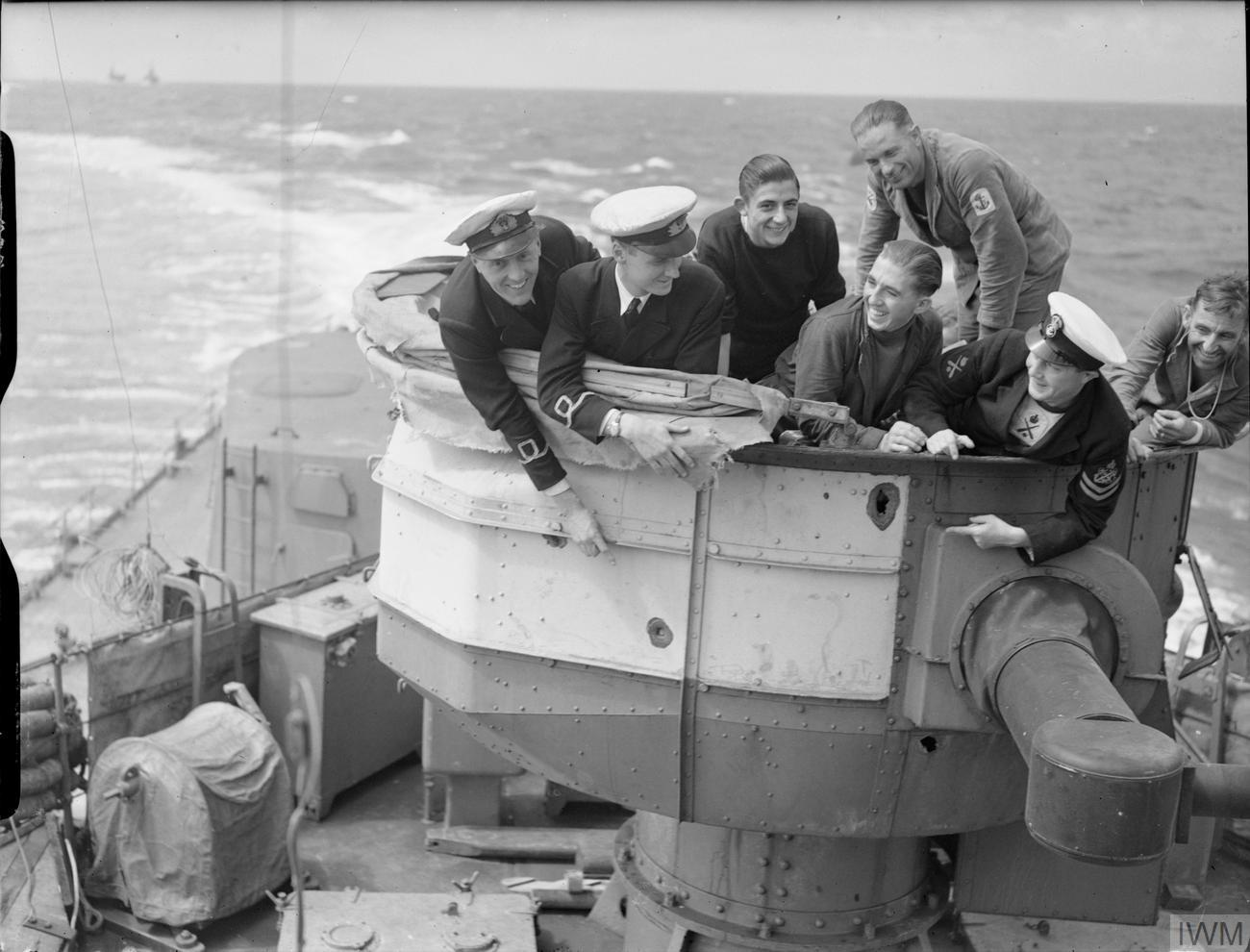
The crew of Sheffield's after director tower, pointing to the splinter holes caused by a near miss from Bismarck.

After the disastrous Battle of the Denmark Strait in which the German battleship Bismarck and heavy cruiser Prinz Eugen sank the British battlecruiser Hood and damaged the battleship Prince of Wales, Force H left Gibraltar on 24 May with Ark Royal, Renown, Sheffield, and six destroyers to counter the German ships' breakout attempt into the Atlantic from the South. After learning through intelligence that the damaged Bismarck was heading for France, Swordfish from Ark Royal and a RAF Coastal Command Catalina were able to locate Bismarck on 26 May. Whilst Ark Royal was recovering her reconnaissance Swordfish and arming them for a torpedo attack, Sheffield was ordered ahead to make contact with Bismarck but the aircrew were not informed of that and were even told that no friendly ships were in the vicinity of Bismarck. As a result, the fifteen Swordfish, which were armed with torpedoes equipped with magnetic pistols, accidentally attacked Sheffield. Some of the magnetic detonators failed to work properly and about half of the torpedoes exploded prematurely, whilst Sheffield was able to dodge the others.

A second attack by the Swordfish was ordered with torpedoes equipped with contact detonators. This time the aircrew were told to make contact with Sheffield before attacking. In the deteriorating weather some of the aircraft did not find Bismarck and had to return to Sheffield, asking for a bearing to the enemy. After the Swordfish had rendered her un-manoeuvrable with a hit on the rudder compartment, Bismarck fired six salvoes at Sheffield. The first salvo went a mile astray but the subsequent salvoes straddled her, causing splinter damage and killing three crewmen. Sheffield retreated under a smoke screen and lost contact with the Bismarck. Still she was able to vector five destroyers under the command of Philip Vian to Bismarck and these destroyers took over the task of shadowing the enemy. Force H remained in the vicinity until the next morning when Bismarck was finally sunk by the battleships Rodney and King George V, and the heavy cruisers Norfolk and Dorsetshire.

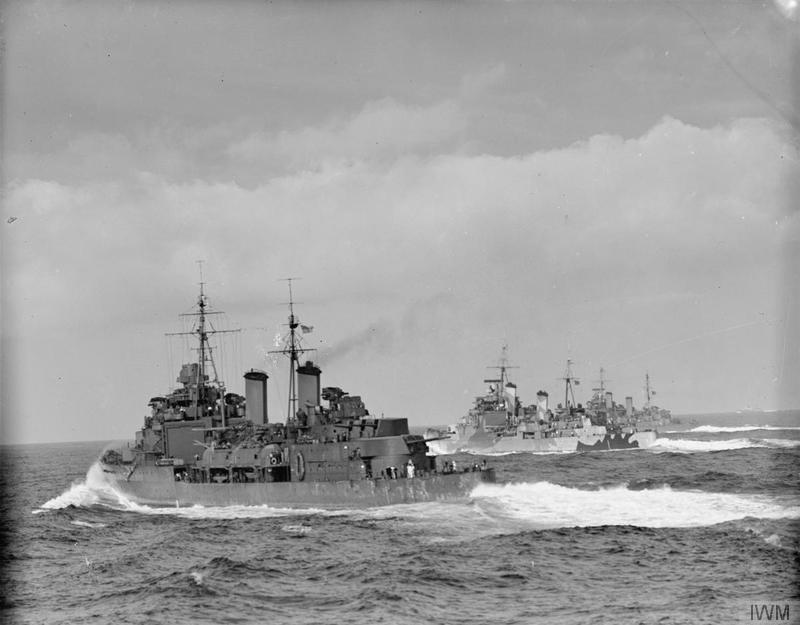
Edinburgh, Sheffield and Kenya underway during Operation Halberd.

On 8 June Sheffield left Gibraltar again together with Force H to avoid air attacks from the Vichy French Air Force as reprisal for the Syria–Lebanon campaign. She detached from Force H to return to Britain and on her way she located and sank one of Bismarck's tankers, Friedrich Breme on 12 June. Sheffield returned briefly to the Mediterranean in September for Operation Halberd, another supply convoy to Malta. On 24 September the convoy consisting of nine ships left Gibraltar, escorted by the aircraft carrier Ark Royal, the battleships Nelson, Rodney and Prince of Wales, the cruisers Edinburgh, Kenya, Sheffield, Euryalus, Hermione, and eighteen destroyers. On 26 September, the British fleet was detected by air reconnaissance and the Italian fleet sailed to intercept with two battleships, three heavy cruisers, two light cruisers and, fourteen destroyers.

The next day, the Italian fleet hesitated to engage the British fleet as the Italian commander gradually realized he was facing superior forces. A strike from Ark Royal did not find the Italian fleet, but Italian torpedo bombers damaged Nelson. Sheffield shot down one of the attacking aircraft. Unlike in previous operations, not all covering forces turned back at Skerki Banks: the battleships did, but the five cruisers remained with the convoy and sailed on to Malta. Italian torpedo aircraft attacked the convoy at dusk on 27 September. Sheffield avoided two torpedoes but one freighter was sunk. The convoy arrived at Malta at noon on 28 September. The escorts refueled at Malta and returned the same day, and reached Gibraltar at dusk on 29 September. On her return to the United Kingdom, Sheffield joined the light cruiser Kenya in the search for German blockade runners in the North Atlantic, which had been located by ULTRA codebreaking. Only Kenya was able to intercept and sink the supply ship Kota Penang on 3 October west of Cape Finisterre.

=== Arctic convoys ===
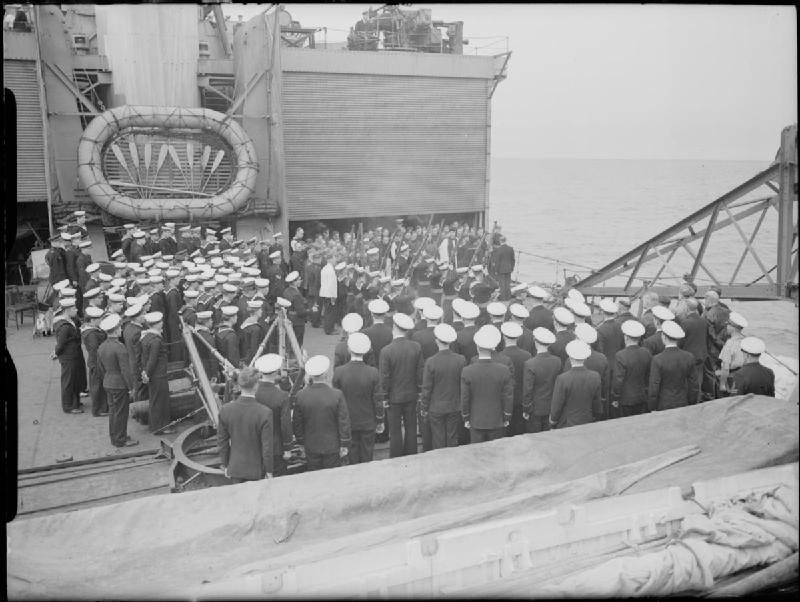
Funeral service on the catapult deck of Sheffield for two German crewman of Friedrich Breme. Note the aircraft hangar doors in the background.

On 7 January 1942, Sheffield arrived in Scapa Flow and was allocated to the 10th Cruiser Squadron together with the light cruiser Edinburgh. In March, the cruiser sailed with the Home Fleet to cover Convoy PQ 12, as a replacement for the heavy cruiser Berwick, which had engine trouble. In Operation Sportpalast the Germans tried to attack the convoy with Tirpitz but due to bad weather the Germans did not find the convoy and abandoned the operation. Sheffield hit a mine off Iceland on 4 March 1942 and was under repair until July. In September 1942 she was stationed at Spitsbergen as part of a force for the relief and supply of the escort for Convoy PQ 18. Arctic convoys were then suspended to reinforce the Allied landings in North Africa in November.

Sheffield joined Force O under the command of Rear Admiral Cecil Harcourt, which was part of the Eastern Task Force responsible for the landings in Algiers. Sheffield ferried also some troops for Operation Terminal: the storming of Algiers Harbor. These troops were transferred to the British destroyers Malcolm and Broke in the night of 7 November. During the landings on 8 November, she was on standby for shore bombardment, but the resisting French fortresses surrendered before she could open fire. In the evening, Sheffield and the light cruiser Bermuda were attacked by torpedo aircraft, but both cruisers could evade the launched torpedoes. After the conclusion of the initial landings in Algiers, the cruiser left the harbor in the evening of 10 November to escort a troop convoy to Bougie to execute landings closer to Tunisia. During the trip to Bougie Sheffield damaged the minesweeper Cadmus in a collision. The troops had an unopposed landing but Axis aircraft appeared soon in large numbers over Bougie and sank three large troopships. Sheffield however returned the same day to Gibraltar.

In December 1942, the Arctic convoys resumed. Dudley Pound, the First Sea Lord and Chief of the Naval Staff, insisted that the convoys required against an attack by the German surface fleet stationed in Norway, by giving them cover of a cruiser force all the way to North Russia. The Home Fleet usually sailed as well but kept its distance. Sheffield and Jamaica formed "Force R", under the command of Rear-Admiral Robert Burnett (in Sheffield). Force R escorted the first Convoy JW 51A into Kola Bay on 24 December and left on 27 December to meet Convoy JW 51B. The convoy was attacked on 31 December by two German forces, consisting of a heavy cruiser, Admiral Hipper and Lützow, and three destroyers each. In the Battle of the Barents Sea, both German forces were able to reach the convoy but whilst Admiral Hipper tried to lure the convoy escort vessels away from the convoy, Lützow failed to press on and did not sink any merchant ship. Finally Force R arrived and in several engagements, damaged Admiral Hipper with three hits. Whilst the Germans were withdrawing, Sheffield sank the German destroyer Friedrich Eckoldt. There were some more skirmishes, but the Germans were under strict orders not to risk their big ships against equal opponents and avoided an engagement. In the bad visibility and the darkness of the polar nights, the Germans had difficulty finding and identifying their opponents whilst the British with their superior radars did not have these problems.

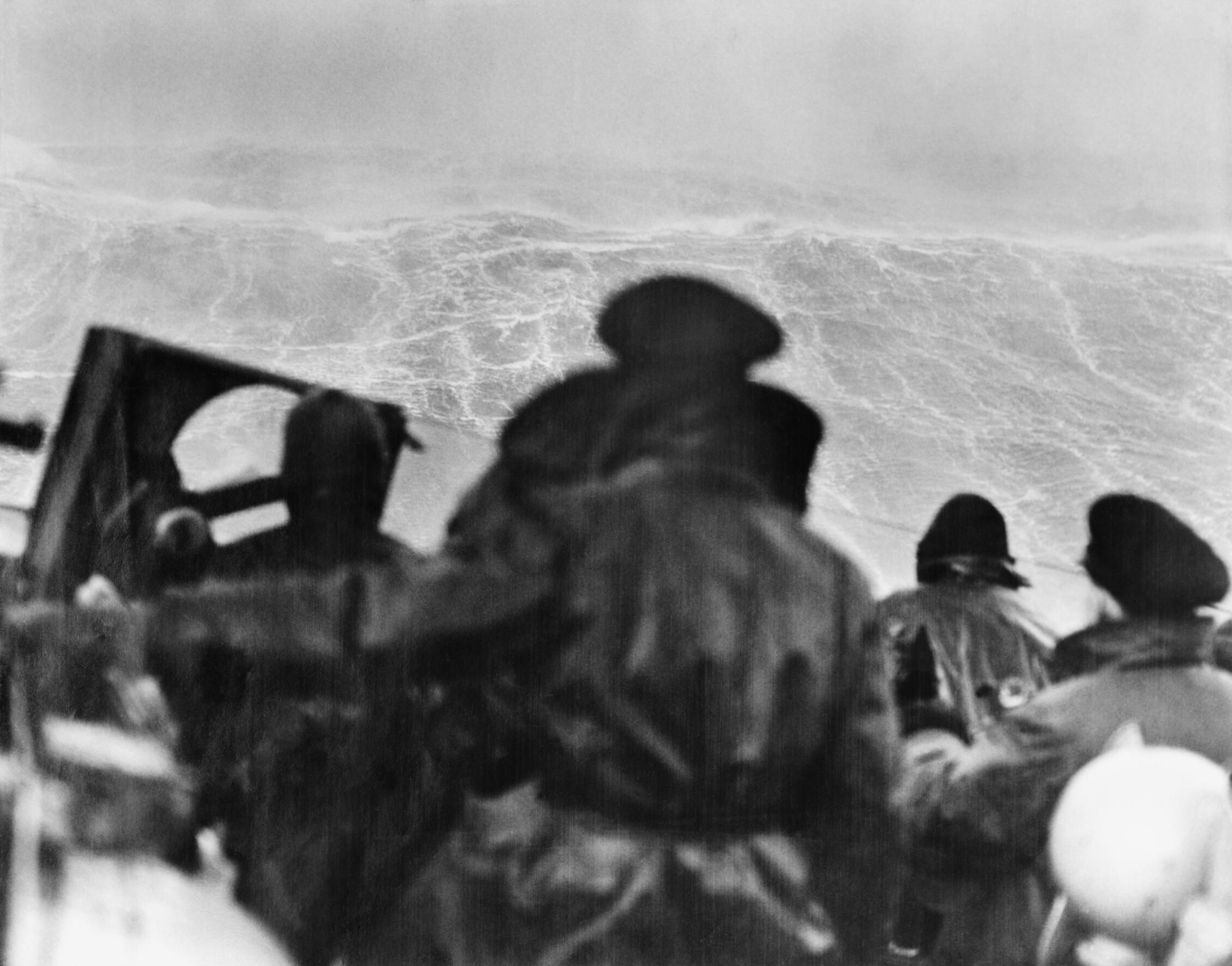
View from the bridge of Sheffield during the gale whilst escorting JW 53 in February 1943, showing waves almost at eye level on the bridge.

In January 1943, Sheffield was part of the distant cover force based on the battleship Anson, for the outbound Convoy JW 52 and the homebound convoy RA 52. As this force was meant to counter any threat from the German surface fleet only, it kept its distance from the convoy itself in order to remain clear of the threat posed by German aircraft and U-boats. In February 1943, the 10th Cruiser Squadron consisting of Sheffield, Belfast and Cumberland as Force R were assigned to escort the next convoy JW 53. On 19 February she was damaged in a gale when a giant wave buried her forecastle and ripped off half of the roof of 'A' turret. Sheffield had to be replaced by Norfolk and returned to Iceland for repairs. At the end of August 1943, Sheffield operated briefly together with Bermuda as a cover force for British anti-submarine forces attacking U-boats in the Bay of Biscay. At the conclusion of this operation she rushed to the Mediterranean, to give fire support on 14 September to the troops facing a German counter-attack after the Operation Avalanche the landings at Salerno.

In November 1943, the Arctic convoys resumed. The first pair of convoys–Convoy JW 54A and Convoy JW 54B–sailed unopposed. But on 19 December, Großadmiral Karl Dönitz asserted to Hitler that the Kriegsmarine would attack and destroy the next convoy. Anticipating an attack by Scharnhorst, the commander of the Home Fleet Bruce Fraser organized a trap: for the next convoys–Convoy JW 55A and Convoy JW 55B–the cruiser escort consisting of the 10th Cruiser Squadron with Sheffield, Belfast and Norfolk would keep Scharnhorst at bay and shadow her so that he could stay undetected at distance with the battleship Duke of York and race to the scene when needed. On 26 December at 09:21 Sheffield was the first to sight Scharnhorst, and in a brief gun duel with the cruisers, the German battleship withdrew and escaped at high speed.

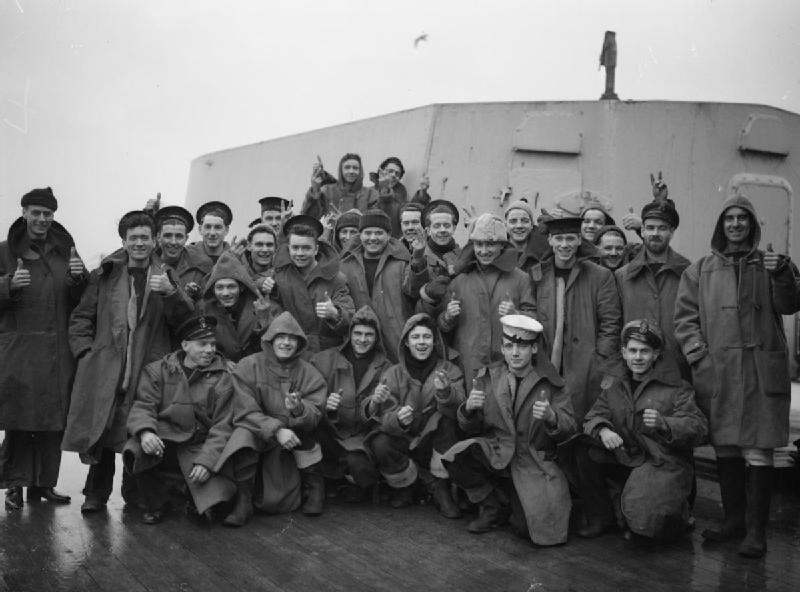
Gun crews of Sheffield after the Battle of the North Cape

The cruisers were not able to follow but positioned themselves correctly on the other side of the convoy where Scharnhorst tried a second attack three hours later. At 12:10 Sheffield's radar detected Scharnhorst at a distance of 12 miles and a second engagement developed. Sheffield was straddled by several salvoes but then Scharnhorst changed target and hit Norfolk two times. Fearing torpedo attacks, Scharnhorst broke off the action and turned for port in Norway. The cruisers kept shadowing but first Norfolk and then Sheffield dropped behind with engine trouble. Belfast remained in touch with Scharnhorst and guided Duke Of York to the scene. At 19:45 the German battleship was sunk by gunfire from Duke Of York and torpedoes from the escorting destroyers. Sheffield could not catch up in time to participate in the sinking. During the return voyage to the UK, she suffered damage to one of her propellers and went for a small refit to Liverpool.

On 30 March 1944, Sheffield left Scapa Flow as part of the Home Fleet, which was a covering force for Convoy JW 58. After the passage of the convoy to North Russia, the Home Fleet executed Operation Tungsten, a raid by carrier aircraft on Tirpitz at her moorings in the Kaafjord. Tirpitz was damaged and put out of action by this attack, but she was repaired within weeks and hence follow-up attacks were needed. Sheffield assisted in one more carrier operation in May, when she was part of the escort for the escort carriers Emperor and Striker. This force made two sorties towards Rørvik and Stadlandet on 14 and 15 May.

Sheffield did not participate in the Normandy landings but instead left England on 18 July for a lengthy refit in Boston. She had her 'X' turret removed in exchange for improved anti-aircraft guns. On 29 May 1945 she sailed back to England for further refit in Portsmouth, installing modern radar and electronics in preparation for service with the British Pacific Fleet.

During her service in World War II, Sheffield was awarded a total of twelve battle honours, which placed her together with the destroyer Tartar at a shared fourth place, after the battleship Warspite, the light cruiser Orion and the destroyer Nubian, who had all been awarded thirteen.

== Post-war ==
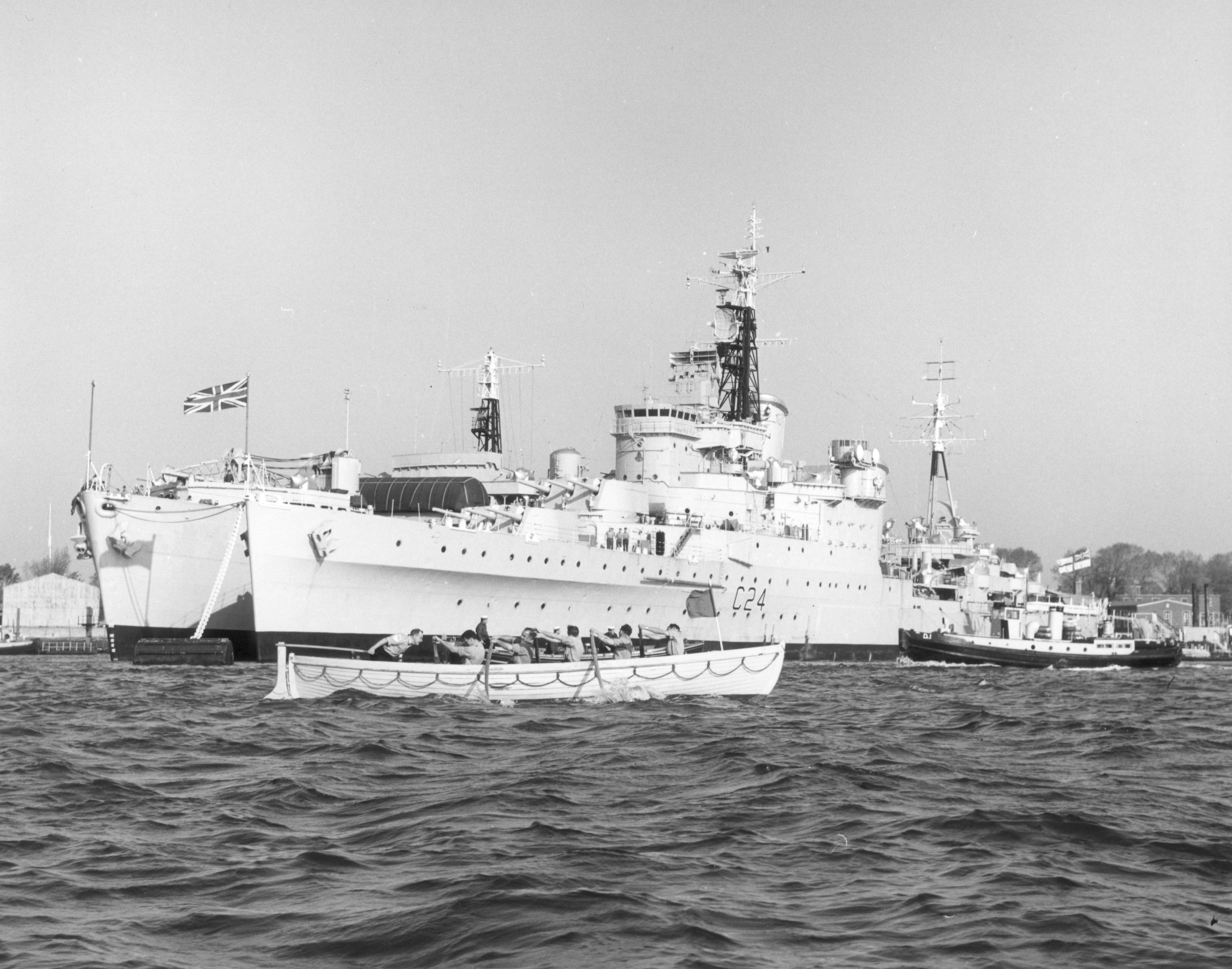
Reserve fleet flagship 1960's

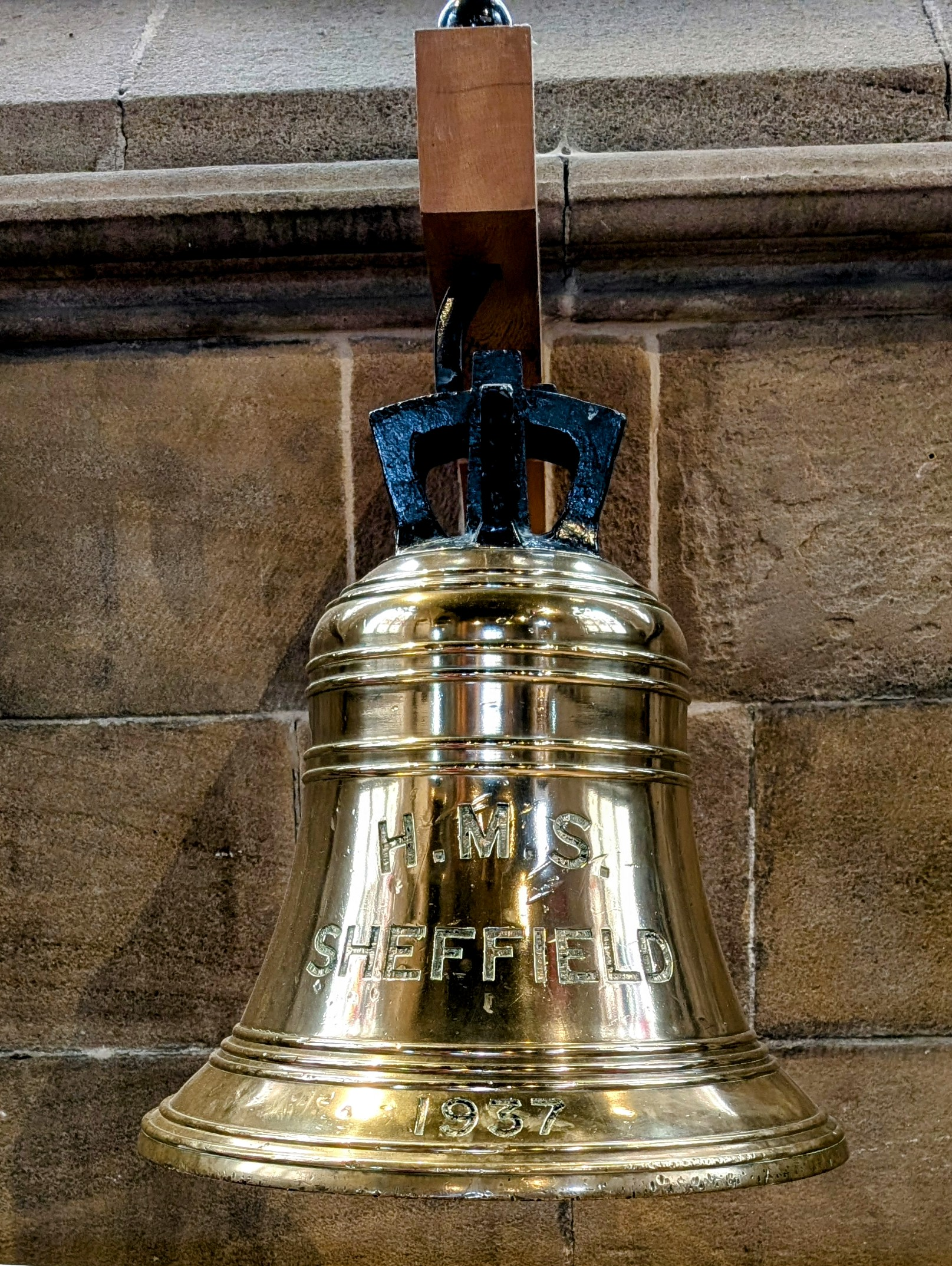
HMS Sheffield's bell

After the refit in May 1946, Sheffield sailed to Malta for a month of drills and exercises before she arrived at her new base–the Royal Naval Dockyard in the Imperial fortress colony of Bermuda–on the 30 August 1946, for duties as flagship on the America and West Indies Station. Her commanding officer, Captain K. G. Harkness, was also the Chief Staff Officer to the Commander-in-Chief, Vice-Admiral Sir Irvine Glennie. During her commission in Bermuda, Sheffield made five cruises, visiting fifty ports and steaming 60,000 miles (97,000 km). She departed Bermuda on 26 October 1948 for England and was replaced as flagship on the America and West Indies Station by Glasgow.

On 12 October 1951, Sheffield returned to Bermuda again as flagship of the America and West Indies Station and replaced Superb. From June 1952 to May 1953, her commanding officer was Captain John Inglis, who was to become director of Naval Intelligence in July 1954. In 1953 she took part in the Fleet Review to celebrate the Coronation of Queen Elizabeth II. On 18 October 1954, she was replaced as flagship of the America and West Indies Station by Superb, leaving Bermuda the same day to decommission at Portsmouth. In 1955, she played the part of the cruiser Ajax in the war film The Battle of the River Plate.

There were further refits in 1949/1950, 1954 and 1956–1957 when her bridge was enclosed, a lattice foremast added, light anti-aircraft defense was modified and a comprehensive anti-nuclear and biological washdown installed in 1959–1960. She became flagship of the Reserve Fleet and served again at sea in 1960 and then as an accommodation ship until September 1964, when she was placed on the disposal list. Her equipment was removed at Rosyth in 1967 and she was then broken up at Faslane in the same year. The stainless-steel ship's bell, which was made by Hadfields of Sheffield, was preserved and hangs in Sheffield Cathedral along with her battle ensign.
