= Lebanese Army Naval Academy =

- Active: 1972 - Present
- Country: Lebanon
- Type: Military Naval School
- Part of: Lebanese Navy
- Garrison/HQ: Jounieh Naval Base, Jounieh
- Mottos: "Lighthouse & Goal"

Commanders
- Current commander: CPT-N Bshara (active 2019)

The Lebanese Army Naval Academy (Arabic: مدرسة القوات البحرية Madrasat al-Kouwat al-Bahriya) is part of the Lebanese Navy. The academy is located at Jounieh Naval Base, Jounieh, in the Keserwan District, and is responsible for the fundamental basic education of the officers and non-commissioned officers students in the fields of naval, military, scientific, and general culture studies.

== History ==
The naval academy was founded in 1972 and its mission was to organize the several educational offices dedicated to the naval expertise. Since early 1990s, the academy's programs have developed and increased in size, thus leading to several training courses given such as the naval rescue course, a training course for naval officers, diving and ciphering courses, in addition to a naval navigation course, a languages course, a training course on the radar and other.

Prior to 2003, all naval students used to take their courses abroad; however, since then the school started receiving students to follow the courses domestically. Nevertheless, some students are sent abroad for further education.

== Organization and structure ==
The academy is organized as follows:

1. Academy command
2. Students officers teaching group
3. Students non-commissioned officers teaching group
4. Special courses and study offices teaching group
5. Command and service company

== Academy System ==
Volunteering students naval officers follow one year in the Military Academy where they learn the different military sciences, later they move back to the Naval Academy to follow a two years naval specialization. After that, the students graduate from the Military Academy.

The system for the non-commissioned officers is similar, as a NCO follows one year in the Teaching Institute, then moves back to the Naval Academy for two year of naval specialization. After the first year, students are divided onto different specializations:

- Naval maneuver technician
- Naval mechanical technician
- Naval electrical technician

== Admission ==
The academy accepts 10 students per year only, as the school's capacity is 150, and as of 2007, 21 officers and 10 non-commissioned officers have only graduated.

=== Requirements ===
The admission follows the same admissions criteria of the Military Academy & the Teaching Institute, as student have to follow the first year in those academies according to their rank.

== Training subjects ==
The training subjects include navigation, maneuver, aerial monitoring, oceanology and naval signaling, in addition to long navigational training (for a period of about 10 days) outside Lebanese waters. Students also learn the certified naval protocol due to their needed objectives locally and internationally, with the naval laws and security precautions taken in the sea.

In addition, some of the major courses taken by the students include Math, Computer, Mechanics and engineering, while third year students train on naval ships for a period of one month.

When it comes to NCOs, more emphasis is put on the scientific and technical materials, that's in addition to the military sciences, health sciences, International law, International Humanitarian Law, general knowledge, along with French and English language.

== Training modules ==
In addition to the core education, the naval academy offer a vocational training to its officers, non-commissioned officers and soldiers via training modules. After successful completion of this modules, the academy issue certificates of competences. The following is a list of certificates given by the Lebanese Army Naval Academy for the enlisted personnel.

| Certificate | US equivalency | French equivalency | Civilian certification / Endorsement |
|---|---|---|---|
| رئيس ربع ملاح | Watercraft operator (Army watercraft) | Navigateur chef de quart (Gendarmerie maritime) | Officer in charge of a navigational watch for ships less than 500 GT; Master for ships less than 500 GT if more than one year of sea service |
| بحري تقني مناور | Assistant Navigator (ANAV) (US Navy) | Navigateur timonier (Gendarmerie maritime) | Able seafarer deck |
| بحري تقني ميكانيكي | Mechanical Technician | Technicien de maintenance navale – mécanique | Able seafarer engine in Attended Machinery Spaces |
| بحري تقني كهربائي | Electronics technician (ET) | Technicien de maintenance navale - électricité | Electrical Technician Able Seaman |
| بحري تقني غطس | Navy Diver (ND) | Plongeur de bord (catégorie B ou C) | Marine Diving Technician |
| مدرب غطس ٤٠ متر | Diving Instructor 40 meters | Moniteur de plongée 40 mètres | Diving Instructor 40 meters |

== Teachers ==
The teachers in the academy are mainly Navy officers according to their specialization, in addition to ground forces officers for the subjects related to infantry, artillery, and armor; however, when it comes to the subjects related to general culture and sciences, doctors from the Lebanese University on loan from the Military Academy teach the subjects. Moreover, teachers from the French Cultural Center are responsible for teaching the French courses.

The academy also occasionally hosts special workshops by foreign teams, these workshops are usually attended by the navy officers and soldiers, in addition to personnel from the Navy SEALs Regiment if concerned.

== See also ==
- Lebanese Navy
- Beirut Naval Base
- Lebanese Army Military Academy
- Lebanese Army Teaching Institute
