= KNDS Narwhal =

French remote-controlled naval gun

Narwhal
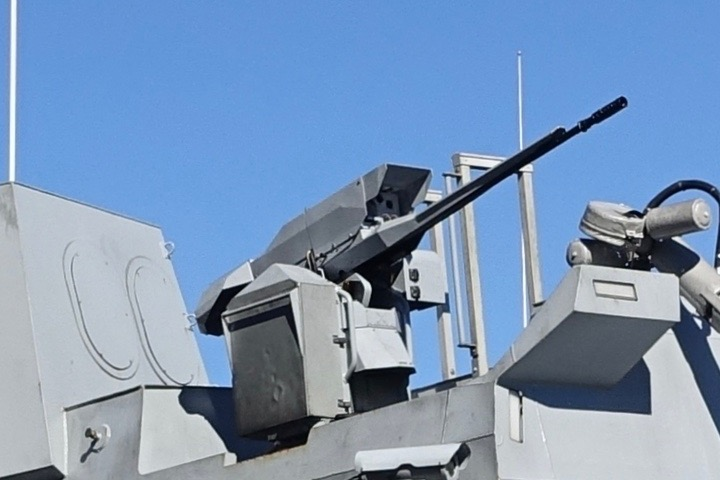
- Type: Autocannon
- Place of origin: France

Service history
- In service: 2013 —
- Used by: French Navy; Egyptian Navy; Coast Guard of Albania; Royal Saudi Navy; Gabonese Navy; Armed Forces of Senegal

Production history
- Designer: KNDS France
- Designed: 2011
- Manufacturer: KNDS France
- Variants: Narwhal 20A; Narwhal 20B

Specifications
- Mass: 390 kg (860 lb) (without ammunition)
- Crew: 1
- Caliber: 20×102mm (Narwhal 20A); 20×139mm (Narwhal 20B)
- Action: Gas unlocked, delayed blowback
- Elevation: +75°/-20°
- Traverse: 360°
- Rate of fire: 800 round/min
- Muzzle velocity: 1,050 m/s (3,400 ft/s)
- Effective firing range: 1,500 m (4,900 ft) against aerial targets

The KNDS Narwhal is a type of remotely operated naval artillery turret made by the French company KNDS France. It houses a 20 mm autocannon based on the Nexter M621 and M693. The name "Narwhal" is a backronym of "NAval Remote Weapon, Highly Accurate, Lightweight". It is designed to fit warships of all types ranging from patrol boats to frigates to aircraft carriers, notably as a close-quarters self-defence weapon.

== Design ==
KNDS France offers two versions of the Narwhal:

- Narwhal 20A, based on the KNDS M621, firing 20×102mm ammunition;
- Narwhal 20B, based on the KNDS M693, firing 20×139mm ammunition. This is the version operated by the French Navy.

The turret houses electro-optical cameras that offer daylight and nighttime vision, as well as a motion tracking system. It can rotate 360° in azimuth, and from +75° to -20° in elevation. The gun is stabilised and can rotate quickly to attack targets at close range.

Interactive 3D model

Video of the gun under several angles

== Users ==
=== France ===
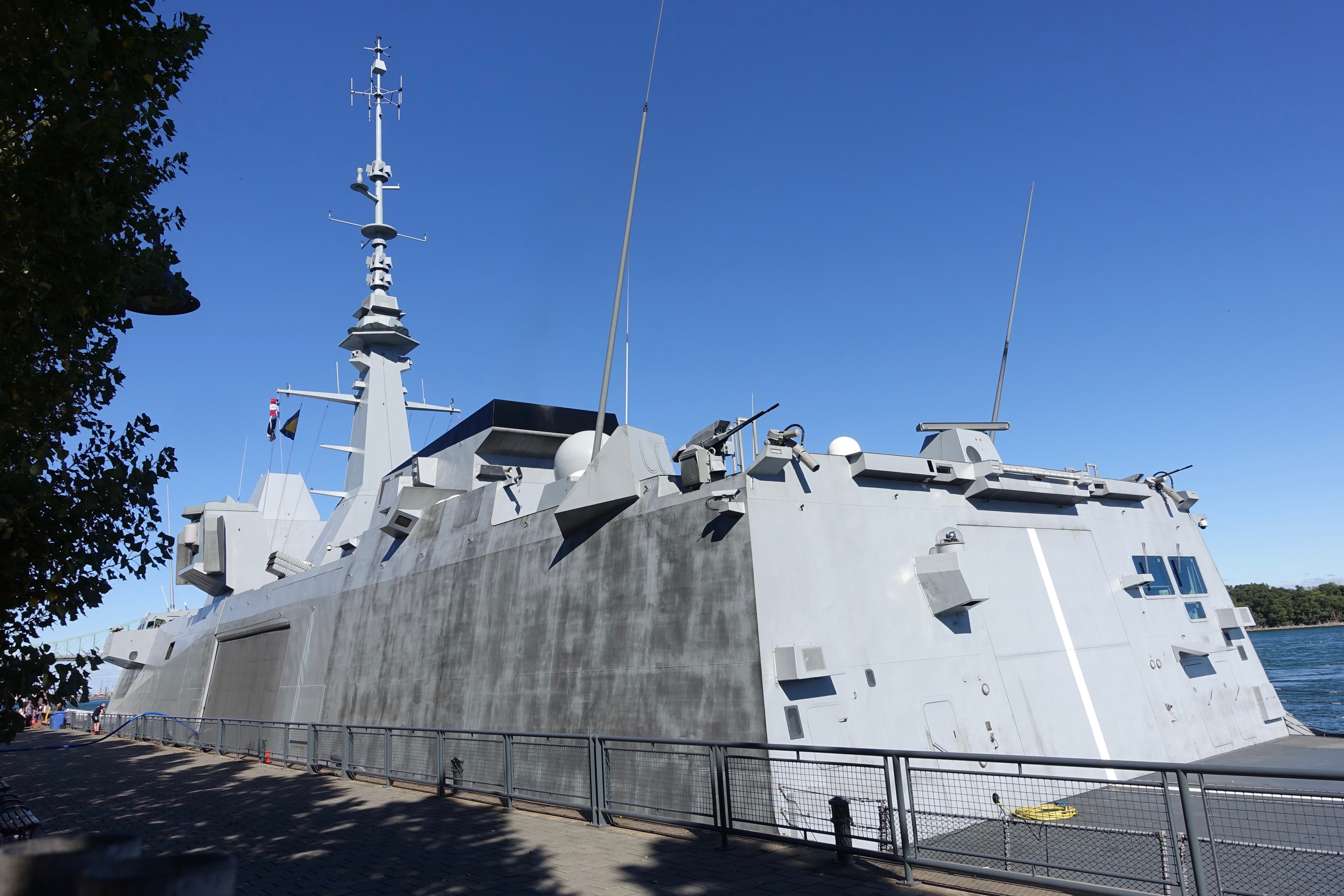
Two Narwhal on top of the fight hangar of the frigate Languedoc.

The French Navy uses the Narwhal on a number of ships. On large units, it is used as a secondary armament for self-defence, while it can constitute the main armament of smaller units.

==== As secondary armament ====
Although the FREMM-class frigates were designed from inception to use the Narwhal, the first units of the series, such as Aquitaine, were not initially fitted with the weapon. The first FREMM to be fitted with Narwhal immediately after construction was Normandie in 2013, before being renamed to Tahya Misr and transferred to Egypt in 2015, without ever being commissioned in the French Navy. The following ship, Provence, as well as all subsequent units, were also equipped with Narwhal at fitting out. The Narwhal on FREMMs are interfaced with the Herakles radar through the combat information system, minimising reaction time when attacking targets.

Mistral-class helicopter carriers received the system during their refit in 2016 for Dixmude, in 2017 for Tonnerre and in 2018 for Mistral.

The aircraft carrier Charles de Gaulle mounted three Narwhal during a refit in 2019 to counter asymmetric threats. Although she had been modified to accommodate the weapon during her mid-lift refit from 2017 to 2018, budgetary reasons had prevented installation at the time.

Air defence frigates of the Horizon class carry three Narwhal to replace the original manually operated 20 mm F2 autocannons. Replacement took place in 2018 on Forbin and in 2019 on Chevalier Paul.

Narwhal is also due to equip the upcoming frégates de défense et d'intervention.

==== As main armament ====
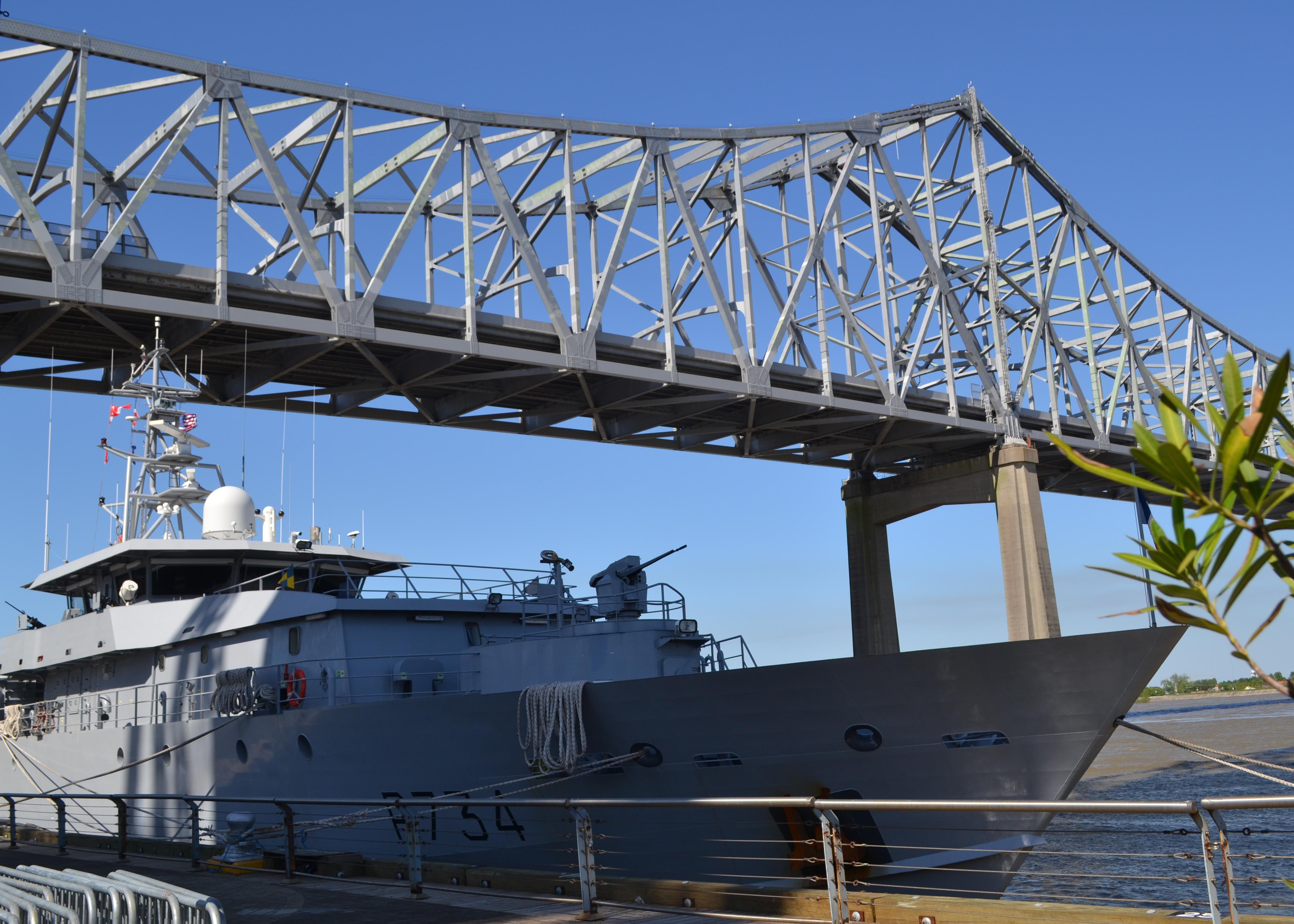
Narwhal 20B on the patrol boat Résolue.

Narwhal constitutes the main armament of the three Confiance-class patrol boats, commissioned from 2016. Confiance was the first French patrol boat to mount the system. The fire control system of Narwhal is designed to guarantee that warning shots land safely off-target.

The project for Patrouilleur Outre-mer patrol vessels, unveiled in January 2020, also had a Narwhal gun as main armament at the bow of the ship.

=== Exports ===
- Egyptian Navy: Two Narwhal 20B installed on the frigate Tahya Misr (ex-Normandie).
- (Albania) Albanian Coast Guard: four 20A delivered in 2017 and 2018 to equip the four Damen-made STAN 4207 patrol boats, purchased in 2008, whose armament was considered to be insufficient.
- Royal Saudi Navy: Narwhal is the main armament of the 38 HSI 32 fast attack crafts built by CMN, initially for the Lebanese Navy, whose first unit was launched on 24 July 2019.
- Gabonese Navy: four Narwhal 20A ordered in 2014 for the four Raidco RPB20 patrol boats, as well as one further gun for the ocean-going patrol boat OPV 50 built by Piriou.
- Senegal Navy: three Narwhal for the three Piriou OPV 58 S patrol boats ordered in November 2019. The first of the series was launched on 11 April 2022.
- Lebanese Navy: 42-Tabarja (ex-Y838 Bergen/ Todendorf class and 308-Nakoura (ex-Bremen 9/Fassmer FPB 20Fassmer FPB 20) patrol boats Narwhal 20A, 307-Sarafand (Attacker class Narwahl 15A.

== See also ==
- Canon de 20 mm modèle F2
- M621
- Bofors 40 Mk4
- Close-in weapon system
