= Friedrich Breme =

Oil tanker

History
- Name: Friedrich Breme (1936–1941)
- Owner: German-American Petroleum Company (1936–1940); Kriegsmarine (1940–1941)
- Builder: Deutsche Schiff- und Maschinenbau, Bremen
- Yard number: 905
- Launched: August 1936
- Out of service: 4 June 1941
- Homeport: Bremen (1936–1940); Brest (1940–1941)
- Fate: Scuttled

General characteristics
- Type: Tanker
- Tonnage: 10,397 GRT (1936–1941))
- Length: 487 ft 0 in (148.44 m)
- Beam: 69.8 ft 0 in (21.28 m)
- Depth: 31 ft 7 in (9.63 m)
- Installed power: 909 Nhp (1936–1941)
- Speed: 12 knots (22 km/h; 14 mph)

Friedrich Breme was an escort tanker that was built in August 1936 for the German-American Petroleum Company in Bremen. On 12 June 1941, Friedrich Breme was spotted by the light cruiser HMS Sheffield at position 49.80°N 24.126111°W northwest of Cape Finisterre, came under fire and was scuttled. 88 German sailors were rescued, which included 12 wounded. The Friedrich Breme was the escort tanker for the heavy cruiser Admiral Hipper and the German battleships Scharnhorst and Gneisenau in the Atlantic Ocean.
