= HMS Kenya =

Fiji-class cruiser

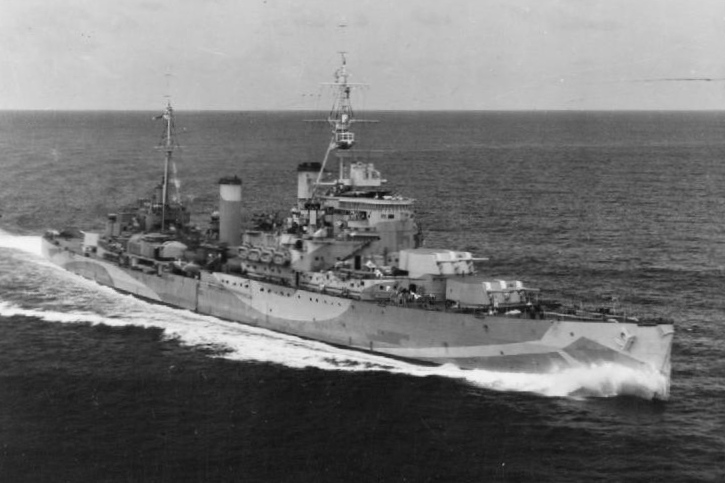
- Kenya underway

History

United Kingdom
- Name: Kenya
- Namesake: Colony and Protectorate of Kenya
- Builder: Alexander Stephen and Sons, Glasgow, Scotland
- Laid down: 18 June 1938
- Launched: 18 August 1939
- Commissioned: 27 September 1940
- Out of service: In reserve September 1958
- Identification: Pennant number: 14
- Fate: Scrapped, 29 October 1962

General characteristics (as built)
- Class & type: Fiji-class light cruiser
- Displacement: 8,580 long tons (8,720 t) (standard)
- Length: 555 ft 6 in (169.3 m)
- Beam: 62 ft (18.9 m)
- Draught: 19 ft 10 in (6 m)
- Installed power: 4 Admiralty 3-drum boilers; 80,000 shp (60,000 kW)
- Propulsion: 4 shafts; 4 geared steam turbine sets
- Speed: 32.25 knots (59.73 km/h; 37.11 mph)
- Range: 6,250 nmi (11,580 km; 7,190 mi) at 13 knots (24 km/h; 15 mph)
- Complement: 733 (peacetime), 900 (wartime)
- Armament: 4 × triple 6 in (152 mm) guns; 4 × twin 4 in (102 mm) DP guns; 2 × quadruple 2-pdr (40 mm (1.6 in)) AA guns; 2 × quadruple Vickers 0.5 in (12.7 mm) AA machine guns; 2 × triple 21 in (533 mm) torpedo tubes
- Armour: Engine and boiler rooms: 3.25 in (83 mm); Decks: 2–3.5 in (51–89 mm); Magazines: 2–3.5 in (51–89 mm); Gun turrets: 1–2 in (25–51 mm)
- Aircraft carried: 2 × seaplanes
- Aviation facilities: 1 × catapult, 2 × hangars

HMS Kenya was a Fiji-class cruiser of the Royal Navy. The ship was named after Kenya, a British possession at the time of the ship's construction.

== Service history ==
=== Construction and early service ===
Kenya was launched on 18 August 1939 from the yards of Alexander Stephen and Sons, Glasgow, Scotland and after working up was commissioned on 27 September 1940. She took part in the hunt for the German battleship Bismarck in May 1941 whilst part of the 2nd Cruiser Squadron, Home Fleet, based at Scapa Flow. On 3 June Kenya and the cruiser Aurora surprised and sank the German tanker Belchen which was supplying German submarine U-93 in the Davis Straits.

=== Operation Stonewall ===
During September and October 1941, the Royal Navy devised Operation Stonewall, to intercept U-boats which were escorting outbound blockade runners through the Bay of Biscay into the Atlantic. After providing escort to the Malta convoy Operation Halberd on 24 September on 1 October, Kenya and the cruiser Sheffield made to intercept the blockade runner Rio Grande, destined for Japan and escorted by U-204. Rio Grande escaped but another blockade runner, Kota Pinang, was sunk on 3 October west of Cape Finisterre.

=== Arctic operations ===
New research into declassified State Department records on the Soviet Union has revealed that on 19 March 1942, Kenya transported 10 tons of gold from the Soviet Union to the United States as payment for loans and war materials.

Kenya also avoided damage in air attacks by the Germans on 27–28 March. She had by now received the nickname "The Pink Lady", due to her Mountbatten Pink camouflage paint, during the commando raid against installations on Vågsøy Island off the Norwegian coast. This was attributed to her Mountbatten Pink camouflage blending in with the pink marker dye the Germans were using in their shells, preventing German spotters from distinguishing between shell splashes and the ship. The force returned to Scapa Flow in early January 1942. Kenya returned to escorting Arctic convoys between March and May 1942. On 22 March after escorting PQ12 to Murmansk Kenya was loaded with 10 tonnes of Russian bullion and took it back to Britain for safe keeping.

=== Operation Pedestal ===
Kenya played a prominent role in Operation Pedestal during August 1942. Pedestal was a Royal Navy operation to escort a convoy of 14 merchant ships through the western Mediterranean to relieve and resupply the besieged island of Malta. The convoy escort was the largest ever assembled in World War II, comprising 2 battleships, 3 aircraft carriers (Eagle, Victorious and Indomitable), 7 light cruisers (including Kenya) and 26 destroyers. Through 11 and 12 August, it successfully fought off massed air attacks by the German Luftwaffe and the Italian Regia Aeronautica, with the loss of only 1 merchant ship and 1 destroyer. The aircraft carrier HMS Eagle was also lost to a lone submarine attack on 11 August.

The heavily mined waters between Sicily and Tunisia (the Narrows) made it too dangerous for the battleships and surviving aircraft carriers to escort the convoy all the way to Malta, and for the last 300 kilometres (190 mi), the escort comprised a smaller force (Force X) of cruisers and destroyers, including Kenya. During the night of 12 August and during the following day, the convoy was heavily attacked by Axis air forces, submarines and motor torpedo boats. During these actions, Kenya's bow was blown off by a torpedo fired by the Italian submarine Alagi. This necessitated emergency shoring of the forward bulkhead and a reduced maximum speed of 25 knots (46 km/h; 29 mph).

In all, a further two cruisers and eight merchant ships were lost in the night action of 12/13 August; Only Rochester Castle, Port Chalmers, Melbourne Star, Brisbane Star and the oil tanker Ohio made it to Grand Harbour Valletta, and Kenya was left as the most powerful surviving ship in Force X. After leading the surviving ships of the convoy to the safety of Malta's fighter screen. Kenya then led Force X safely back to Gibraltar, despite further air attacks.

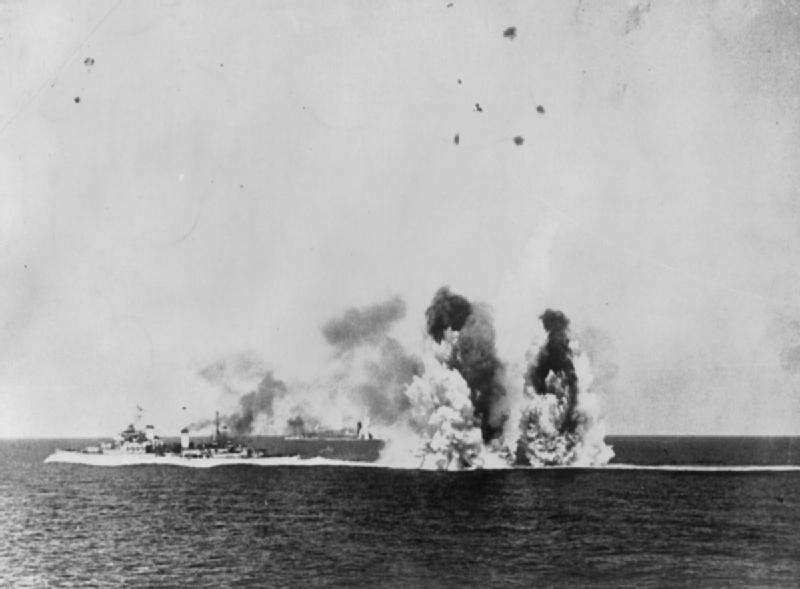
Operation Pedestal, 12 August 1942: Kenya under air attack on her return voyage to Gibraltar.

=== End of war ===
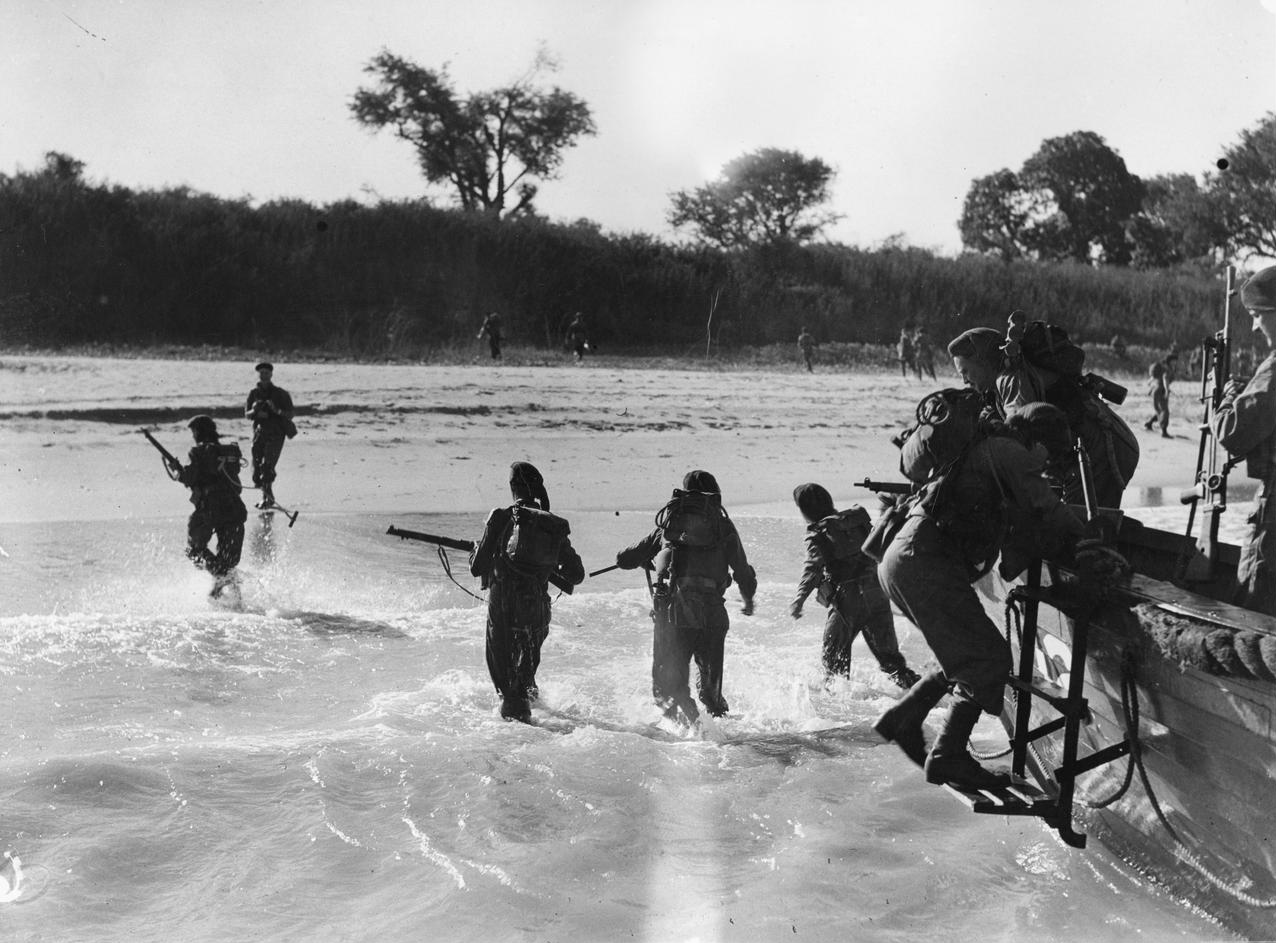
Royal Marines of Kenya dashing ashore as their wooden hulled assault craft touch down on the beach at Cheduba, South of Ramree, Burma. There is a small ladder hanging over the front of the boat so the men can disembark.

Kenya joined the America and West Indies Station with the 8th Cruiser Squadron, based at the Royal Naval Dockyard in the Imperial fortress colony of Bermuda, in October 1946, but in December of the following year, she returned to the UK and was placed in the reserve. The cruiser had a comprehensive modernisation in 1945–1946 with new standardised, twin 40 mm light anti aircraft guns and updated surface and long-range early-warning radar and fire control for the anti-aircraft armament. She was reactivated to replace the cruiser London on the Far East station, in 1949 after another extensive refit.

=== Korean War ===
Kenya took part in naval operations in the Korean War. In March she bombarded Choda Island in preparation for landing 200 Republic of Korea troops there. Unfortunately the troops never showed up.

After further patrols off Inchon her next action came on 11 April when she was ordered to leave Sasebo to search for a communist aircraft that had been shot down. She was called off the operation early to sail to Kure, Japan where Captain Podger took command of the ship on 22 April. In May she took position off Inchon and spent about 10 days there bombarding the land on several occasions. The patrols and bombardments continued throughout the summer – with a trip to Hong Kong that broke the monotony – until 25 August when she left Sasebo, via Hong Kong, for a refit at Singapore. She slipped the refit jetty on 12 November and rearmed before leaving the Far East Station on 17 November. Kenya docked in Malta on 10 December and at Gibraltar three days later before entering the English Channel on 16 December.

Following the war, Kenya had an extensive year long refit in 1945–1946 at Chatham with new radars and standarisation of the light anti-aircraft armament on 5 twin Mk5 Bofors and 8 single 40mm. Kenya saw service in the Korean War on shore bombardment duties. In 1953–1955 the vessel refitted and spent a long period in reserve until August 1955 when she reentered service as a replacement for the cruiser Superb on the West Indian station. She paid off into reserve in August 1958, the ship was declared for disposal in February 1959 and was scrapped in 1962.
