= HMS Striker =

Three ships of the Royal Navy have borne the name HMS Striker:

- HMS Striker (D12) was an Attacker-class escort carrier, built as USS Prince William. She was transferred to the Royal Navy under lend-lease and was launched in 1942. She was returned to the US Navy in 1946 and sold for breaking up.
- HMS Striker (L128) was a landing ship, tank launched in 1945 as LST 3516. She was renamed HMS Striker in 1947 and was sold in 1970.
- HMS Striker (P285) was an Attacker-class patrol boat launched in 1983 and sold to Lebanon in 1992, being renamed Saida.
