= Lebanese Customs Administration =

Lebanese Customs Administration الجمارك اللبنانيـــة

Jurisdictional structure
- Operations jurisdiction: Lebanon
- Specialist jurisdiction: Customs, excise, gambling

Operational structure
- Headquarters: Beirut
- Agency executive: Badri Daher, Director General
- Parent agency: Ministry of Finance

Website
- www.customs.gov.lb

Lebanese Customs (Arabic: الجمارك اللبنانية Al-Jamarek Al-Lubnaniyah) (French: Douanes Libanaises) is the government authority in Lebanon responsible for collecting customs duties and controlling the flow of goods in and out of the country. It operates under the Ministry of Finance.

Lebanese Customs officers are stationed at all of the country's ports of entry which in addition to Beirut Rafic Hariri International Airport includes the five land crossings with Syria and the seaports of Beirut, Tripoli, Sidon, Tyre, and Jounieh. At these ports of entry, in order to enforce border control, Lebanese Customs works together with General Security, which operates under the Ministry of Interior and Municipalities, the latter of which is responsible for controlling the movement of people.

In order to conduct inspections of vessels at sea, Lebanese Customs operates a small naval fleet that consists of two British-made Tracker-class patrol boats, one named LIBNAN II and the other named ARZ II, as well as four Canadian-made Zodiac Hurricane 1110 AFT IO Commando rigid-hulled inflatable boats.

Combating smuggling is primarily the task of the different branches of the Lebanese Armed Forces.
