= Lebanese Navy =

Maritime warfare branch of Lebanon's military

- القوات البحرية اللبنانية
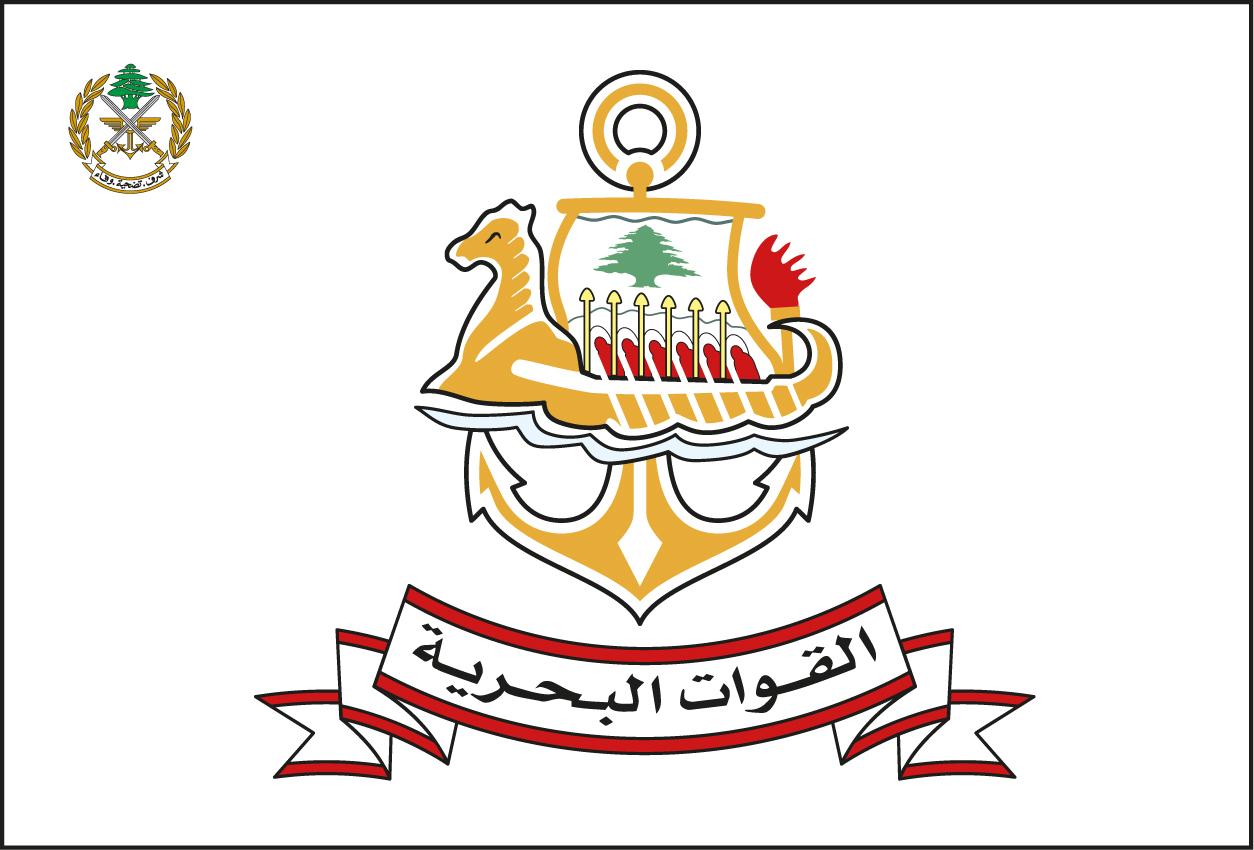
- Flag of the Lebanese Navy
- Founded: 1950
- Country: Lebanon
- Type: Navy
- Size: 1,500 personnel 30 watercraft Interceptors: 8 Patrol boats: 6 Gunboats: 8 Landing craft: 2 Scientific boat: 1
- Part of: Lebanese Armed Forces
- Headquarters: Beirut Naval Base
- Engagements: 1958 Lebanon crisis; The War over Water; Six-Day War; Lebanese Civil War; Battle of the Hotels; Hundred Days' War; Multinational Force in Lebanon 1982–1984; Mountain War; War of the Camps; United Nations Interim Force in Lebanon (1978–present); Operation Dinnieh; Global War on Terrorism (2001- Present); Operation Benin; 2006 Lebanon War; Operation Nahr el Bared; 2008 conflict in Lebanon; 2010 Israel–Lebanon border clash; 2013 Sidon clash; Hanikra border clash; Battle of Arsal; North Lebanon Clashes (2014)
- Website: Official website

Commanders
- Current commander: Haissam Dannaoui

Insignia
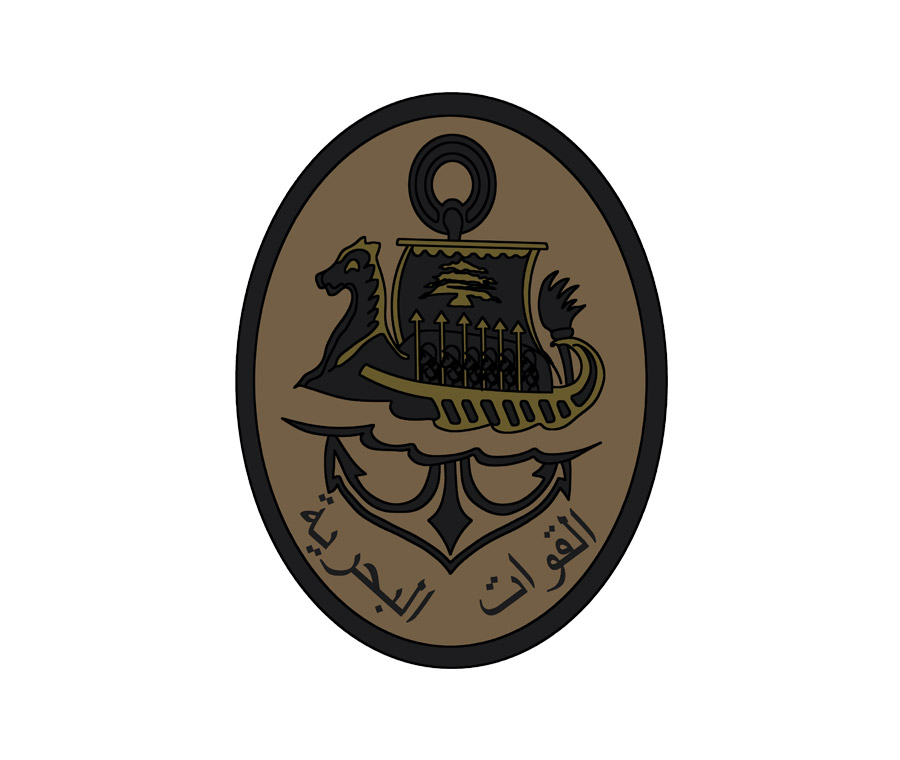
- Emblem

- Jack

The Lebanese Navy (Note: Arabic: القوات البحرية اللبنانية, romanized: Al-qūwātu al-Baḥriyya al-Lubnāniyya, lit. 'the Lebanese Sea Forces') is the naval warfare of the Lebanese Armed Forces. Formed in 1950, it traces its heritage to the maritime civilization of Phoenicia; its flag depicts a Phoenician ship with the Lebanese Cedar tree, positioned on an anchor above the Arabic inscription of the navy's name. Headquartered at Beirut Naval Base, Lebanon's first and largest naval base, the navy has posts Tripoli, Saida, and Tyre.

The Lebanese Navy is charged with several missions, including securing and aiding communications and navigation to Lebanese ports; defending Lebanon's exclusive economic zone, regional waters, and coast from any naval military aggression; fighting terrorism, illegal immigration, smuggling, and drug trafficking; protecting commercial vessels; providing naval support and early warning to security forces participating in joint military operations; and protecting natural resources and national interests along the coast and the regional waters.

The Lebanese Navy has approximately 69 vessels of various sizes and roles, most of which are outdated and deemed unfit for modern service; however, it has embarked on a modernization and expansion program in partnership with the United States, France, the United Nations, and other allies. The navy has also sought to enhance its capabilities, engaging in joint exercises with the United States in 2022, and opening a new naval academy with Germany assistance the following year.

== History ==
The Lebanese Navy forces were established in 1950 and were located in the 1st basin of Beirut Port. In 1972, they were transferred to Jounieh after gaining authority over the buildings of Jounieh Naval Base. After the Lebanese Civil War, they moved back to the Beirut Naval Base.

=== 2006 Lebanon war ===
During 2006 Lebanon war, posts of the Naval Forces along the Lebanese coast conducted active early detection operations of drones from the opposing Israeli side. These drones targeted certain posts, leading to casualties and injuries among the military personnel.

The Navy also helped in clearing the petroleum pollution caused by the targeted fuel tanks at the Jiyeh electricity station.

=== Nahr el Bared Camp ===
In 2007, during internal fighting between the Lebanese Army and Islamist groups in the Nahr el-Bared Palestinian refugee camp near Tripoli, the Lebanese Navy stopped and intercepted any supplies from reaching the jihadists and were able to prevent them from escaping through sea. In 2009, the Lebanese government approved a request by the Lebanese Ministry of Defense to build a new naval base on the shores of the camp.

=== Rescue operations ===
Ethiopian Airlines Flight 409 was an international commercial flight scheduled from Beirut to Addis Ababa that crashed into the Mediterranean Sea shortly after takeoff from Rafic Hariri International Airport on 25 January 2010, killing all 90 people on board. On the morning following the crash, Lebanese authorities reported locating the crash site 3.5 kilometres (1.9 nmi) off the coast from the village of Na'ameh, in 45 metres (148 ft) of water. The search for survivors was carried out by the Lebanese Army, using Sikorsky S-61 helicopters, the Lebanese Navy and UNIFIL troops. On 7 February, Lebanese Army divers recovered the plane's flight data recorder and cockpit voice recorder (CVR). The CVR was missing a memory storage unit when found. This was reported on 16 February as having been recovered. All were sent to the French Bureau of Enquiry and Analysis for Civil Aviation Safety (BEA) for analysis. All the deceased were recovered from the sea by 23 February.

==== Migrant boats ====
- September 22, 2022 – At least 94 people are killed when a boat carrying migrants from Lebanon capsizes off Syria's coast. 9 people survived. Many were declared missing and some were found either dead or injured.
- April 23, 2022 – 6 people die and around 50 people are rescued after an overloaded boat sinks in Tripoli, Lebanon.
- September 24, 2023 – The Lebanese Navy rescued 27 migrants from a sinking boat off the coast of northern Lebanon.
- October 7, 2023 – The Lebanese Navy rescued 124 Lebanese and Syrians on board an illegal immigration boat off the shores of al-Mina.
- December 17, 2023 – The Naval forces rescued 51 people from a sinking migrant boat.

== Equipment ==
=== Current fleet list ===
Class	Type	Origin	In Service	Note	Photos
Patrol boat
Advanced Multimission Platform; AMP 145 (LOA 43.50 metres)	Coastal and blue water patrol craft	United States	41-Trablous	Delivered by United States in 2012.	
Marine Protector-class patrol boat (LOA 27.00 meters)	Patrol boat	United States	3 units 2701; 2702; 2703	Delivered by United States in 2024 ex-USCGC Dorado, ex-USCGC Chinook, ex-USCGC Shearwater	
Todendorf class (LOA 28,90 Meters)	Security boat (Sicherungsboot)	Germany	42-Tabarja (ex-Y838 Bergen)	Donated by Germany in 2008 ,Armed with NEXTER Narwhal 20A (RWS).	
Fassmer FPB 20 (LOA 20,00 meters)	Security boat (Sicherungsboot)	Germany	308-Nakoura (ex-Bremen 9)	Donated by Germany in 2007.: Armed with NEXTER Narwhal 20A (RWS).; Equipped with water cannon for fire fighting.	
Attacker class (LOA 20,00 meters)	Boat	United Kingdom	307-Sarafand	Armed with NEXTER Narwhal 15A (20mm cannon).	
Fast interceptor boat
Phenix 55 FPB (17 meters/46 knots)	Speedboat	Lebanon	Sannine		
Medium Yacht (Captured from a drug smuggler)	Boat		501-Imanuella		
Small support boat
SILLINGER 1200 RAFALE (LOA 11.53 meters)	High-speed interceptor	France	4	Donated by France in 2020: Front machine gun support.; Side machine gun supports.	
Gun Boats (11 meters)	RHIB	United States	16	.8 delivered by United States in 2013 and 8 delivered in 2014.4 off them operate by the Lebanese marine commando regiment.	
SAFE 44 full cabin (13.4 meters)	Boat	United States	4	Delivered by United States in 2024.	
Combat Rubber Raiding Craft	Rigid inflatable boat	United States	8	Delivered by United States in 2009 operate by the Lebanese marine commando regiment.	
Asis Boats	aluminum constructed, 11-meter Interceptor Boats	United States	4	Received in 2022 operate by the Lebanese marine commando regiment.	
Rafnar 1100 Leiftur 1100	tactical Cabin RIB (Rigid Inflatable Boat).	Iceland	1	Donated by Italy in 2022	
Landing craft
Engin de débarquement d'infanterie et de chars (LOA 59,00 Meters)	Landing craft	France	21-Sour; 22-Damour	Donated by France in 2005	
Scientific boat
Hydrographic/ survey/ (7.5 meters)	Hydrographic ship	Italy	1	Donated by Italy in 2017 Housed with sophisticated electronic equipment for carrying out undersea measurements.	
Drones
Rotary unarmed drones - Unknown type	Surveillance and reconnaissance drone	United Nations	8	flight duration up to 50 minutes Donated by the UNODC	

On February 19, 2015, the Saudi press agency quoted on a Saudi official that Saudi Arabia had halted the $3 billion program for military supplies to Lebanon. The Lebanese Navy does not have any operational vessels maneouvrable in difficult weather conditions and undergoes difficulties in accomplishing Search and Rescue missions, Marine Safety, Marine Environmental Protection, Maritime Law Enforcement and the controlling of illegal migrant traffic to Europe. Also, Lebanon intends to provide protection for the future natural gas installations and enforce the Law and State authority in Lebanese territorial waters. Lebanon counts on the US military aid to be equipped with multi-function vessels with a wide range of capabilities such as the RiverHawk OSV 60.

In May 2021, The United States announced that it donate 7 ships to the Lebanese Navy

=== Coastal Radar Stations ===
The Lebanese Navy is in charge of the coastal radar stations, in 1992, three stations in all of Tripoli, Sidon, and Tyre were established, followed by upgrades and new stations in 1997. However, during the 2006 Lebanon War all of the stations were bombed by the Israeli Navy. After the war ended, Germany and Lebanon signed a bilateral agreement to establish The Coastal Radar Organization (CRO) which aimed to create and consolidate a chain of seven coastal radar stations with the ability to cover the entire Mediterranean coast of Lebanon. Three of these stations are older and were refurbished with new equipment and facilities; the four other are new installations.

== Training ==
The Lebanese Naval Forces send nearly all of their Navy officers for training abroad in a variety of European countries as well as the United States. Each country offers different training depending on the specializations of each officer. Officers sent to the United States have undergone schooling in surface warfare and experienced on job training with the US Coast Guard. Many Lebanese Naval Forces Engineers head to France where they receive education regarding detection, transmission, and artillery. Skills used in much of the domestic duties of the Lebanese Naval Forces from initial staff courses, amphibious training, and maritime drug enforcement are taught at British academies. The skills of the Lebanese Naval Forces are not incredibly diverse or necessarily advanced to the level of European countries due to their limited human resources and equipment.

== Cooperation with the UNIFIL MTF ==
The existence of the UNIFIL Maritime Task Force is helping the Lebanese Navy to enhance the skills of its personnel through the periodical joint exercises and daily cooperation. Upon the arrival of the MTF to the region (after the 2006 Lebanon War), the Lebanese Navy began jointly working with the navy in lead, which at the time was the Italian Navy, in order to ensure a successful outcome to the assigned peace operation.

== See also ==
- Marine Commandos
- Lebanese Army Naval Academy
- Lebanese Marine Rescue Unit
- List of navies
