= Lebanese Army Teaching Institute =

Training Institute
- Lebanese Army Teaching Institute Flag
- Active: August 07, 1961 - Present
- Country: Lebanon
- Type: Military Academy
- Part of: Lebanese Armed Forces
- Garrison/HQ: Mohamed Makki military base

Insignia
- Emblem

The Teaching Institute, also known as the Training Institute (Arabic: معهد التعليم Maa'had al-taa'lim), is a Lebanese Armed Forces training center. Established on August 7, 1961 as a teaching school in north Lebanon, it was restructured, reconstructed, and reorganized many times during Lebanon's civil war. Its last major overhaul was in 2000.

== History ==
The Teaching Institute was established on August 7, 1961. On September 1, 1967 it became an independent unity. Its current structure is a result of many changes up to 2000, and is as follows:

- School commandment and unity of commandment and service
- Defense battalion
- Logistic battalion
- Non-commissioned-officers school
- Infantry school
- Specialized schools range

== Mission ==
The mission of the Teaching Institute is to provide the -commissioned officers and recruited soldiers with all stages of military training according to the dependent schools.

== Schools ==
=== Non-commissioned officers school ===
The school was founded in May 1967, and is headquartered at Mohamed Makki military base. Its mission is to train candidates for three years to be promoted to the rank of sergeant.

To be admitted, a candidate must:

- Be Lebanese for more than ten years
- Not be convicted of any offense or try to commit it to any foul crime, nor sentenced to more than six months in prison
- Be a person of a good standing, not addicted to alcohol, drugs or gambling
- Not be applied to any entrance exam to any instruction of the national ministry of defense and eliminated for cheating
- Have passed the GCSEs (grade 9) or any official equivalent
- Be single, widowed without children or divorced without children

=== Infantry school ===
The school was founded on August 7, 1961, and is headquartered at Mohamed Makki military base. Its mission is to train conscripts as well as all recruited soldiers to pass any rank.

=== Specialized schools range ===
Founded on December 24, 1983, and is headquartered at Mohamed Makki military base. Its mission is to train dependent specializations in addition to qualitative section sessions inside all offices. The specialization schools are:

- Management school
- Transportation school
- Signal school
- Armor school
- Artillery school
- Engineering school

== Support battalions ==
In addition to the schools, the Institute has its own logistics battalion founded on August 7, 1961, and is responsible for providing the schools with logistics and other basic needs. The institute also has its own defense battalion founded on the same date, which is responsible for safeguarding and defending the Institute.
