= MV Kota Pinang =

Dutch cargo liner, launched 1930

- Kota Pinang in the North Sea Canal, just after being completed.

History
- Name: Kota Pinang (1930–1940); Klara (1940–1941)
- Owner: Rotterdam Lloyd
- Operator: (Nazi Germany) Kriegsmarine (1940–41)
- Port of registry: (Netherlands) Rotterdam
- Builder: Nederlandsche SM, Amsterdam
- Yard number: 201
- Laid down: 16 January 1929
- Launched: 23 November 1929
- Completed: 29 May 1930
- Identification: 1930: code letters PHRT; by 1934: call sign PFLT
- Fate: Scuttled, 1941

General characteristics
- Type: Cargo liner
- Tonnage: 7,275 GRT; 4,532 NRT
- Length: 464 ft 7 in (141.61 m) overall; 449.4 ft (137.0 m) registered
- Beam: 60.7 ft (18.5 m)
- Draught: 26 ft 9 in (8.15 m)
- Depth: 29.7 ft (9.1 m)
- Decks: 3
- Installed power: 1 x MAN 7-cylinder 2-stroke double-acting diesel engine; 1,857 NHP; 5,200 BHP
- Propulsion: 1 x screw
- Speed: 14 knots (26 km/h; 16 mph)

MV Kota Pinang was a cargo liner ordered by Rotterdam Lloyd and built by Nederlandsche Scheepsbouw Maatschappij in Amsterdam in 1930. She was launched on 23 November 1929. In May 1940, the ship was requisitioned by the Kriegsmarine, renamed Clara and converted into a Reconnaissance scout for naval operations by the German battleship Bismarck and cruiser Prinz Eugen in the Atlantic. In June 1941, the ship was converted again to operate as a U-boat supply vessel. On the 3 October 1941, she was sunk by the British cruiser Kenya.

== Construction ==
Kota Pinang was one of a number of cargo liners built from the mid-1920s onwards by Rotterdam Lloyd to take Muslim pilgrims from the Dutch East Indies to Jeddah, on their journey to the Hajj. The first ship in the series was the SS Kota Inten built in 1927.

== Sinking ==
On 3 October 1941, Kota Pinang was sighted at 43.51°N 24.06°W, 750 miles (1,210 km) west of Cape Finisterre by the Fiji-class cruiser Kenya. At 17:18 hours, Kota Pinang reported a ship behind her. At the time, Kota Pinang was being escorted by the German submarine U-129. Kota Pinang attempted to disguise herself by signalling that she was an English freighter, in an attempt to lure Kenya across the line of fire, of her escort Heavy rain stymied her efforts and at 17:28 hours Kenya opened fire on Kota Pinang, which was heavily damaged. At 17:43 the captain ordered the crew to abandon ship and at 17:45, scuttling charges exploded in Kota Pinang's engine room. Kenya fired a single torpedo to complete the ships sinking.

The German submarine U-79 had been ordered to escort Kota Pinang to the South Atlantic and waited at their rendezvous point, not realising she had already been sunk.
