= Beirut Naval Base =

Naval base in Beirut, Lebanon

Coordinates: 33.9017°N 35.5094°E

Beirut Naval Base (Arabic: قاعدة بيروت البحرية, romanized: Kaidat Beirut al Bahriyah) is the first naval base and the headquarters of the Lebanese Navy, established in 1950. The base comprises a part of Port of Beirut, and was affected by the massive ammonium nitrate explosion on 4 August 2020.
