= Fassmer FPB 20 =

Patrol boat

Class overview
- Builders: Fassmer
- Operators: Lebanese Navy; German Police Authority Bremen
- In commission: 1992–present
- Completed: 1
- Active: 1

General characteristics
- Type: Patrol boat
- Displacement: 32 tonnes (31 long tons) s
- Length: 20 m (65 ft 7 in) o/a
- Beam: 5.6 m (18 ft 4 in)
- Draught: 1.45 m (4 ft 9 in)
- Propulsion: 2 × 2 x MTU 12V 183 TE 92, 735 kW, 2300 rpm; Propeller: Schaffran, z = 3
- Speed: 30 knots (56 km/h; 35 mph)
- Range: 300 nmi (560 km)
- Boats & landing craft carried: 3 m Daughter Boat with Crane
- Complement: 3-6 persons
- Armament: 2 × 12.7 mm machine guns; Water cannon / Fire Fighting Equipment
- Notes: Hull No. 1280

The Fassmer FPB 20 patrol boat is a unique patrol boat built originally for the Bremen Police under the name of Bremen 9.

In 2007, The boat was turned over to the Lebanese navy and has been renamed Naqoura, after the Naqoura coastal town in Lebanon. The Lebanese Navy is using the boat for fishery monitoring, search and rescue, and patrolling Lebanon's territorial waters out to 12 nautical miles (22 km; 14 mi).

In addition to its usual facilities the boat is also equipped with 3 m Daughter Boat with Crane, and a water cannon for fire fighting.

The boat is powered by 2 Motor and Turbine Union engines that give a top speed of 30 knots (56 km/h; 35 mph).
