= Attacker-class patrol boat =

Class overview
- Name: Attacker class
- Builders: Fairey Allday Marine
- Operators: Royal Navy; HM Customs; Lebanese Navy; Lebanese Customs

General characteristics (Lebanon service)
- Type: Patrol boat
- Displacement: 34.54 tons (full load)
- Length: 20 m (65 ft 7 in) (overall); 19.25 m (63 ft 2 in) (waterline)
- Beam: 5.18 m (17 ft 0 in)
- Draught: 1.15 m (3 ft 9 in)
- Propulsion: 2 × G.M. 12V71 T1 diesels driving 2 shafts, 1,300 bhp (970 kW)
- Speed: 21 knots (39 km/h; 24 mph)
- Range: 650 nmi (1,200 km; 750 mi) at 20 knots (37 km/h; 23 mph)
- Complement: 11
- Sensors & processing systems: Decca 1216 navigation radar (ex-Royal Navy); Decca 2690 navigation radar (ex-British Customs)
- Armament: 3 × 12.7 mm machine guns (ex-Royal Navy); 1 × twin 23 mm anti-aircraft gun (ex-British Customs)
- Notes: Taken from:

The Attacker class (also referred to as the Tracker class) is a class of patrol boats. Formerly operated by the Royal Navy and HM Customs, seven of the class are currently operated by the Lebanese Navy and two by Lebanese Customs.

== Design and construction ==
The Attacker class was constructed by Fairey Allday (Fairey Marine Ltd), on the River Hamble in Hampshire, England. HMS Attacker was built in Cowes, on the Isle of Wight, while the rest of the class were built in Southampton.

The ships have glass-reinforced plastic hulls. The vessels were allocated to various RNR Divisions. HMS Striker being based in Liverpool as a tender to HMS Eaglet. Eventually the vessels were re allocated to the URNUs.

== Operational history ==
HMS Attacker, Hunter and Striker formed the Cyprus Squadron and were used for patrol and harbour protection. HMS Attacker was the training ship for the University Royal Naval Unit serving Glasgow and Strathclyde Universities, while HMS Chaser performed this role at the Aberdeen URNU and HMS Fencer performed the same role for Southampton University. Patrol ships carried three general purpose machine guns, while the training ships were unarmed.

The Attacker class was decommissioned from the Royal Navy during 1991 and 1992. All five ships were sold to the Lebanese Navy in July 1992. Two Attackers formerly operated by the British Customs Service were also sold to Lebanon in March 1994.

== List of ships ==
- HMS Attacker (P281) - Transferred to the Lebanese Navy and renamed Trablous in 1992.
- HMS Chaser (P282) - Transferred to the Lebanese Navy and renamed Jbeil in 1992.
- HMS Fencer (P283) - Transferred to the Lebanese Navy and renamed Jounieh in 1992.
- HMS Hunter (P284) - Transferred to the Lebanese Navy and renamed Arz in 1992.
- HMS Striker (P285) - Transferred to the Lebanese Navy and renamed Saida in 1992.
- Safeguard (Customs) - Transferred to the Lebanese Navy and renamed Batroun in 1994.
- Swift (Customs) - Transferred to the Lebanese Navy and renamed Sarafand in 1994.
- Libnan II (Lebanese Customs)
- Arz II (Lebanese Customs)
