= Atia =

Atia or ATIA may refer to:

== People ==
- One of the spellings of the Arabic name Atiyah
- Atia (gens), plebeian family of Rome
- Atia (mother of Augustus) (85 BC – 43 BC), Roman noblewoman, daughter of Julius Caesar's sister Julia Caesaris, mother of the Emperor Augustus
- Atia of the Julii, fictional character from the television series Rome, based on Atia the mother of Augustus

== Others ==
- Ouled Atia, town and commune in M'Sila Province, Algeria
- Atia, Bulgaria, village in Burgas Province, Bulgaria
- Assistive Technology Industry Association
- Access to Information Act, a Canadian statute

== See also ==
- Atea (disambiguation)
- Attea, a coastal town of ancient Mysia or of Aeolis
- Attia
- Attias
- Atias
- Atiyah
- Attieh family
