= Attia =

Attia may refer to:

- Attia (gens), a plebeian family at Rome

== Given name ==
- Attia El-Sayed Aly (born 1954), Egyptian volleyball player
- Attia Ashour (1924–2017), Egyptian mathematician
- Attia Hamouda (1914–1992), Egyptian weightlifter
- Attia Hosain (1913–1998), Indian feminist, writer, and broadcaster
- Attia Al Nashwy (born 1988), Egyptian footballer
- Attia Nasreddin (born 1950), Eritrean-born Nigerian businessman
- Attia Shaalan, Egyptian bodybuilder

== Surname ==
- Caroline Attia (born 1960), French alpine skier
- Dove Attia (born 1957), French musical producer and television personality
- Hassan El-Sayed Attia (born 1931), Egyptian sport shooter
- Kader Attia (born 1970), French artist
- Mahmoud Attia (born 1981), Egyptian Paralympic powerlifter
- Mohamed Ben Attia (born 1976), Tunisian director and screenwriter
- Peter Attia (born 1973), American physician
- Raafat Attia (1934–1978), Egyptian footballer

== See also ==
- Ouled Attia, town and commune in Skikda Province in northeastern Algeria
- Attia v British Gas plc, 1988 English tort law case, establishing that nervous shock from witnessing the destruction of personal property may be actionable
- Attias
- Atias
- Atia (disambiguation)
- Attea
- Atiyah
