= Attias =

Attias is a surname. Notable people with the surname include:

- Cécilia Attias (born 1957), second wife of French President Nicolas Sarkozy until October 2007
- Dan Attias (born 1951), American television director and producer
- Emilia Attias (born 1987), Argentine actress, dancer, model and TV host
- Richard Attias (born 1959), Moroccan events producer, founder and former chairman of PublicisLive and the executive chairman of Richard Attias and Associates
- Yitzhak Attias (born 1958), Gibraltar-born Israeli musician
- Ziggy Attias (born 1966), American artist, entrepreneur, founder and director of the Château d'Orquevaux Artist Residency in France

== See also ==
- Attia
- Atia (disambiguation)
- Atias
- Atiyah
- Attieh family
