= Atea (disambiguation) =

Atea is a deity in Polynesian mythologies.

Atea or ATEA may also refer to:

== Places ==
- Atea (village), in Romania
- Atea, Zaragoza, a municipality in Spain
- Atea Cave, in Papua New Guinea

== Organisations ==
- ATEA, the Brazilian Association of Atheists and Agnostics
- ATEA, the Australian Telecommunications Employees Association

== Other uses ==
- Atea, the Spanish translation for the feminine form of atheist
- Ātea-1 and Ātea-2, rockets produced by Rocket Lab
