= Irreligion in Brazil =

Religion in Brazil (2010)
1. Catholic Church (64.6%)
2. Protestantism (22.2%)
3. Spiritism (2.00%)
4. Other religions (3.20%)
5. Irreligious (8.00%)

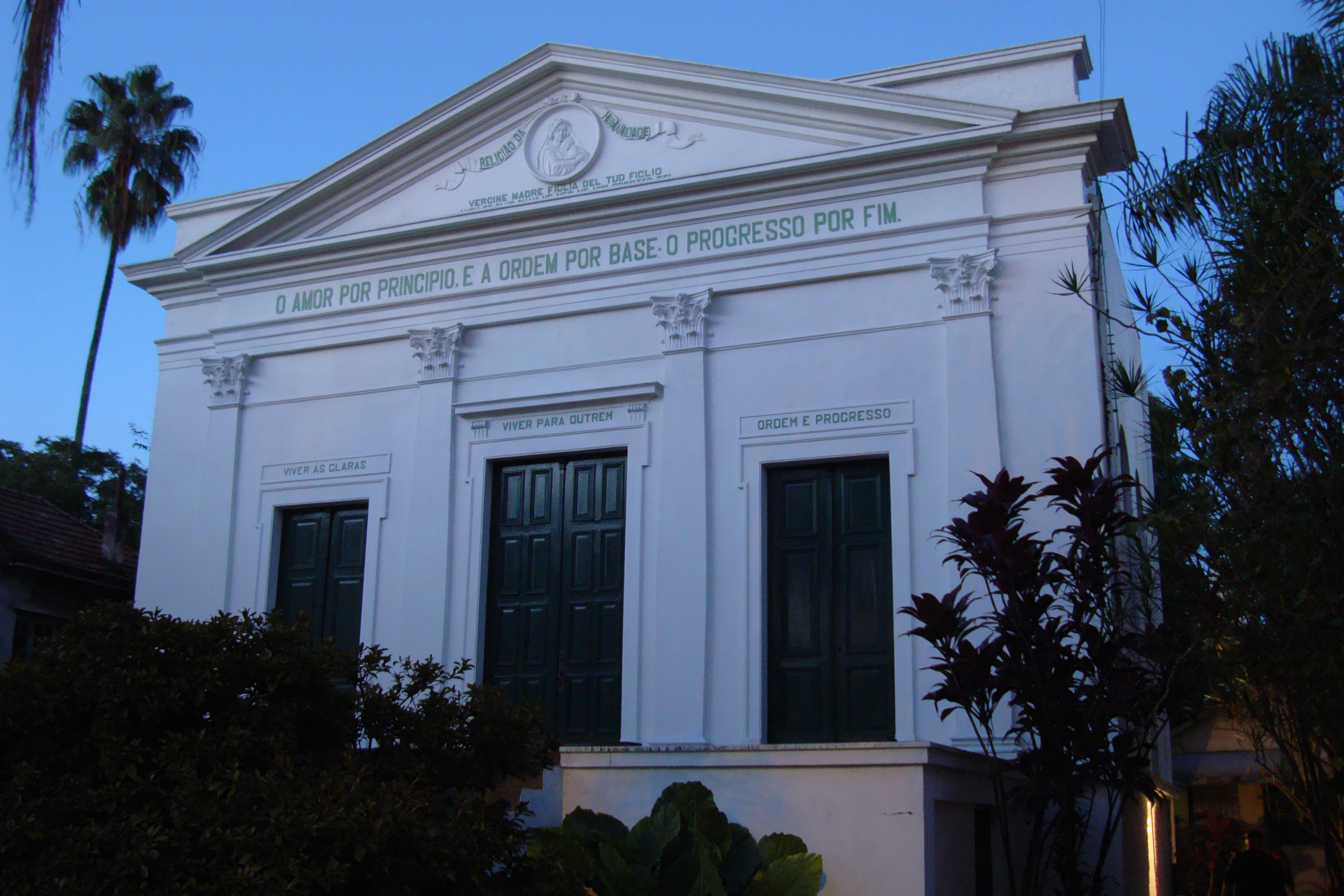
Positivist temple in Brazil. Positivism, a secular movement, influenced the thinking and actions of the founders of the Brazilian republic

Irreligion in Brazil has increased in the last few decades. In the 2010 census, 8% of the population identified as "irreligious". Since 1970, the Brazilian Institute of Geography and Statistics has included sem religião (Portuguese for no religion) as a self-description option in their decennial census, for people who do not consider themselves members of any specific religion, including non-affiliated theists and deists. In the 2010 census, 8.0% of the population declared themselves "irreligious".

The Constitution grants freedom of religion and thought to its citizens (Art. 5, VI). In 2008, the Brazilian Association of Atheists and Agnostics was founded; it promotes secularism and supports irreligious victims of prejudice.

Although the Federal Constitution guarantees religious tolerance to all its citizens (see article 5, item VI), it expressly prohibits all entities that make up the Federation to create and finance public cults and state churches controlled and coordinated by the Government – (see article 19, I), since until now the Brazilian State recognizes the "peculiar character" of the Catholic Church under the other religions in its legal system (see Article 16 of Decree 7107/2010), which is why the law recognizes the Virgin Mary, the mother of Jesus, as the "patroness of Brazil" (see Article 1 of Law 6,802 / 1980); the Constitution is sworn "under the protection of God" (see Preamble of the Federal Constitution); Catholic holidays (such as the day of Our Lady of Aparecida and the day of our Lord's birth) are recognized as national holidays by law (see Law 10.607 / 2002, Law 6.802 / 1980); the Catholic religion has an exclusive status for itself (see Decree 7107/2010); cities and states bear the name of Catholic saints; Catholic statues are exposed in public offices; the expression "God be praised" is present in all Real notes; and religious teaching exclusively Catholic in public schools is permitted in the country (see ADI 4439).

A 2009 survey showed that atheists were the most hated demographic group in Brazil, among several other minorities polled. According to the survey, 17% of the interviewees stated they felt either hatred or repulsion for atheists, while 25% felt antipathy and 29% were indifferent.

In 2022 a Datafolha survey found that non-religious people accounted for 25% of the Brazilian youth (aged between 16 and 24 year-old) nationwide. In the country's two largest cities of São Paulo and Rio de Janeiro the non-religious represent 30% and 34% of the people of the same age respectively, outnumbering youth from all other religious groups. According to professors Ricardo Mariano and Silvia Fernandes there's a growing trend in Brazil of religious disaffiliation among young people because of social liberalization and their individualistic beliefs often seen as conflicting with often harsh moral dogmas, strict codes of conduct and the increasing politicization of religions by the churches, especially the evangelicals. The Christian Post in 2026 reported that 21% of Brazil identified as atheist or as having no religion.

== Notable non-religious Brazilians ==
- Alinne Moraes, atheist actress
- Arnaldo Jabor, atheist film director and pundit
- Candido Portinari, atheist painter
- Chico Anysio, atheist comedian and actor
- Chico Buarque, atheist musician and writer
- Drauzio Varella, atheist physician and TV personality
- Ferreira Gullar, atheist poet, playwright and art critic
- Jorge Guinle, atheist businessman, heir and playboy
- Letícia Persiles, atheist actress
- Luis Fernando Verissimo, atheist writer
- Manuel Bandeira, deist poet
- Marcelo Gleiser, skeptic physicist who suggests replacing mysticism with reason and scientific contemplation
- Miguel Nicolelis, atheist scientist
- Nando Reis, atheist singer-songwriter
- Nathalia Dill, atheist actress
- Oscar Niemeyer, atheist architect and designer
- Paula Burlamaqui, deist actress
- Paulo Autran, atheist actor
- Paulo César Pereio, atheist actor
- Ricardo Boechat, atheist journalist

== See also ==
- Religion in Brazil
