= Attia gens =

Ancient Roman family

The gens Attia was a plebeian family at Rome, which may be identical with the gens Atia, also sometimes spelled with a double t. This gens is known primarily from two individuals: Publius Attius Atimetus, a physician to Augustus, and another physician of the same name, who probably lived later during the first century AD, and may have been a son of the first. A member of this family rose to the consulship in the early second century, but his career is known entirely from inscriptions.

== Members ==
- Publius Attius Atimetus, physician to Augustus, perhaps the same person as the freedman of the physician Cassius, who lived in the time of Scribonius Largus, physician to Claudius, and who was quoted by Galen, who gives his name as Atimetrus.
- Publius Attius Atimetus, another physician, probably later during the first century AD.
- Publius Attius Varus, governor of Africa and supporter of Pompey, active during Caesar's civil war.
- Attius Labeo, a Roman poet who translated the works of Homer. His translation has been lost.
- Sextus Attius Suburanus, consul suffectus in AD 101, consul in 104.
- Lucius Attius Macro, consul suffectus from the Kalends of September to the end of the year in AD 134. He had previously served as praetor, legate of the first legion at Brigetio, and the seventh legion in Hispania Tarraconensis, and was governor of Pannonia Inferior from 130 to 134.
- Marcus Attius Cornelianus, Praetorian prefect under Alexander Severus.

== See also ==
- Atia (gens)
- List of Roman gentes

== Bibliography ==
- Aelius Galenus (Galen), De Compositione Medicamentorum per Genera (On the Composition of Medications According to their Kind), De Compositione Medicamentorum Secundum Locos Conscriptorum (On the Composition of Medications According to the Place Prescribed).
- Johannes Rhodius, Ad Scribonium Largum: Emendationes, et Notae (Emendations and Notes on Scribonius Largus), Paulo Frambotto, Padua (1655).
- Johann Albert Fabricius, Bibliotheca Graeca, sive Notitia Scriptorum Veterum Graecorum (The Greek Library, or Knowledge of Ancient Greek Writers), Christian Liebezeit & Theodor Christoph Felginer, Hamburg (1718).
- Johann Christian Wernsdorf, Poëtae Latini Minores (Minor Latin Poets), Altenburg, Helmstedt (1780–1799).
- Dictionary of Greek and Roman Biography and Mythology, William Smith, ed., Little, Brown and Company, Boston (1849).
- Theodor Mommsen et alii, Corpus Inscriptionum Latinarum (The Body of Latin Inscriptions, abbreviated CIL), Berlin-Brandenburgische Akademie der Wissenschaften (1853–present).
- Ronald Syme, "Governors of Pannonia Inferior", in Historia: Zeitschrift für Alte Geschichte, vol. 14 (1965).
- Werner Eck, "Jahres- und Provinzialfasten der senatorischen Statthalter von 69/70 bis 138/139", in Chiron, vol. 13 (1983).
- Werner Eck, Paul Holder and Andreas Pangerl, "A Diploma for the Army of Britain in 132 and Hadrian's Return to Rome from the East", in Zeitschrift für Papyrologie und Epigraphik, vol. 194 (2010).
