= Attyé =

- Atiyah
- Assane Attyé
