= Ferzol =

Ferzol الفرزل Fourzol, Ferzol
- Village
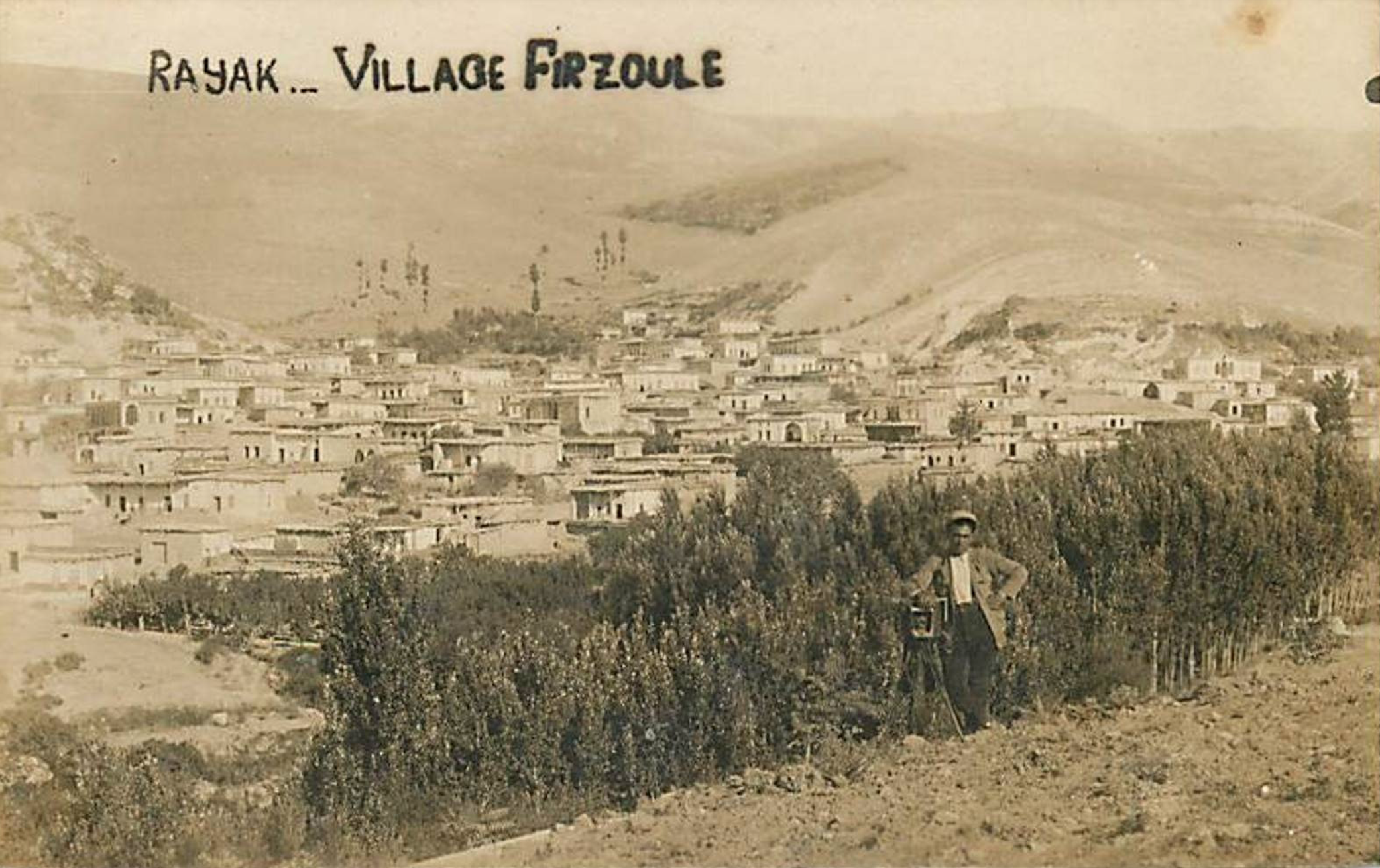
- Ferzol, ca 1925

- Location in Lebanon
- Coordinates: 33°51′48″N 35°56′59″E
- Country: Lebanon
- Governorate: Beqaa Governorate
- District: Zahlé

Government
  - Type: Municipality
  - Mayor: Melhem Ghassan
- Elevation: 3,300 ft (1,000 m)

Population (2004)
  - Total: 2,217
- Time zone: UTC+2 (EET)
  - Summer (DST): +3

Ferzol (Levantine Arabic: الفرزل, romanized: il-Firzul), also spelled Forzol, Ferzul or Fourzol, is a village located in the Zahlé District of the Beqaa Governorate in Lebanon. It lies approximately six to eight kilometres north of Zahlé, the principal city of the Beqaa Valley, along the road toward Baalbek, at an elevation of roughly 1,000 metres above sea level. It is situated south of Nabi Ayla and west of Ablah. Today, Ferzol is home to a mostly Melkite Greek Catholic community, and is administratively part of the broader Zahlé municipality, though it maintains its own municipal council.

== History ==
=== Prehistoric and Canaanite periods ===
Some of the earliest archaeological evidence of human settlement in Ferzol is found in the cave system of the Wadi al-Habis. Some historians have argued that these caves represent among the earliest human habitations in the region. Archaeological evidence dating back over three thousand years demonstrates continuous occupation from the Stone Age through the Roman and Byzantine periods. Many of these caves are connected by tunnels, and some still preserve ancient water cisterns. Stone-cut evidence at the site includes Canaanite, Phoenician, Roman, and Byzantine-era inscriptions and carvings. These multilingual inscriptions testify to the successive cultural occupations of the site.

A study of the Wadi al-Habis that drew on field surveys, local testimonies from elderly residents, and comparative analysis with similar sites in the region, concluded that the complex's earliest use extended to at least the fourth millennium BCE, placing it within the Chalcolithic or early Bronze Age periods. The caves were used for habitation, water storage, funerary purposes, and later for religious practice. Many of the chambers are interconnected by cut passageways. The largest of the carved caves contains more than nine rooms, and is considered one of the more extensive rock-cut chambers in Lebanon. Most chambers also preserve a basin or small reservoir cut into their floors, evidently used to collect rainwater and springwater, a feature consistent with permanent or semi-permanent occupation rather than purely seasonal use.

As the community's subsistence base expanded from cave dwelling to settled agriculture, occupation gradually shifted from the cliff-face caves onto the more accessible hillside slopes, giving rise to the above-ground settlement that became the historic town of Ferzol.

=== Roman and Byzantine rule ===
The most substantial and legible ancient remains at Ferzol date to the Roman imperial period, and consist of two principle categories of evidence (the ruins of a Roman temple within the town and sarcophagi discovered in the surrounding area. The Roman temple, referred to locally as al-Qalʿa "the Citadel", was dedicated to the worship of the god of light and music, consistent with prior identification of this deity as Apollo. Decorated architectural fragments from the temple's doorway, including carved stone elements of considerable dimensions, remain scattered on the original site. Over time, several carved stones were removed from the site by local families for use as decorative objects in private residences, a process of spoliation common across the post-Roman Levantine landscape. The presence of a Roman sacred site at Ferzol is consistent with the broader pattern of Roman temple construction in the Beqaa Valley, which constituted one of the densest concentrations of Roman religious architecture in the eastern Mediterranean. Prior surveys of Beqaa temples have identified Ferzol among the first tier of documented Roman sacred sites in the valley.

The discovery of two rock-cut sarcophagi off of a public road in Ferzol constituted direct confirmation of Roman-era burial activity in Ferzol. The sarcophagi had been used on multiple occasions. The first contained the remains of two individuals whose skulls and bones had been moved aside to accommodate a third skeleton found in its original burial position, and the second similarly contained the bones of three displaced individuals alongside a primary burial. No metal objects were recovered, but pottery sherds were collected for dating analysis. Local testimony also corroborated these findings, as residents had previously reported the discovery of multiple sarcophagi during plowing and land-clearing activities in fields adjacent to the site of the former Roman temple. Some remains were said to contain skeletal remains with iron nails driven into the skulls, a burial practice documented at other Roman and late antique sites in the Beqaa Valley. Taken together, the cave complex, the Corinthian temple, and the sarcophagi constitute a coherent body of evidence for continuous human settlement and organized religious and funerary activity at Ferzol from at least the fourth millennium BCE through the Roman imperial period.

The Beqaa Valley was classified under Roman administration as part of Coele Syria, and it supplied grain, wine, and olive oil to the Roman eastern provinces. Roman armies passing through the region toward Baalbek extracted iron from the terrain around Ferzol, which could relate to the possible origin of the town's name, which some scholars have linked to parzəlā (פרזלא), the Aramaic word for iron. This likely created ample opportunities for regional trade, commerce, and the spread of Greco-Roman culture within Ferzol and adjacent towns in the Beqaa Valley. The town's strategic location in the Beqaa Valley and proximity to Baalbek would have incentivized settlement and urban development, which likely contributed to Ferzol's regional importance in later eras.

Following the Edict of Milan and the subsequent Christianization of the Roman Empire, the Apollo temple at Ferzol fell into disuse and eventual ruin. It was during the Byzantine era that the town acquired the Greek ecclesiastical name "Mariamne", which is still used today by the Archeparchy of Zahle and Forzol. The Beqaa Valley under Byzantine rule was a contested frontier zone, as it formed the overland corridor between Byzantine Syria and Palestine. Ferzol's position along this corridor meant the town would have experienced the passage of Byzantine military forces and witnessed the upheavals of late antiquity, including the Sassanid Persian incursions of the early seventh century that severely weakened Byzantine power on the eve of the Arab conquest.

=== Early Muslim and Mamluk rule ===
The Muslim conquest of the Beqaa Valley took place in 635 CE, following the Battle of Yarmouk, when forces of the Rashidun Caliphate under Abu Ubayda ibn al-Jarrah extended terms to the region's Byzantine garrisons. In the aftermath of the conquest, Ferzol fell under Arab governance as part of the broader Umayyad, and then Abbasid, provincial administration centered on Damascus. During this period, the town was inhabited by the Bani Assaf (Arabic: بني عساف), a tribe which initially settled in Anjar before moving to Ferzol.

Afterwards, the earliest reliable account of Ferzol's demographics comes from a medieval travel narrative. The scholar Yaqut al-Hamawi visited the town of Ferzol around 1220 CE. He reported that Ferzol was one of the villages of Baalbek, and was inhabited by the Bani Rajah (Arabic: بني رجاء). They were known for their generosity, as well as their hospitality in providing clothing, food, and transportation. Although not much is known about the Bani Rajah or the previous inhabitants of Ferzol, this attestation in the written works of al-Hamawi demonstrates that the town was already inhabited during the High Middle Ages.

A notable event in the medieval history of Ferzol was its destruction under the orders of the Mamluk Sultan Baybars, which was recorded in the thirteenth century CE. Scholars note that this attack left the town devastated and largely depopulated. In the following decades, no contemporary sources mention Ferzol or its inhabitants, which alludes to this fact.

=== Ottoman period ===
==== Early Harfush rule ====
The most detailed account of the families that settled Ferzol after its destruction comes from the genealogical text of the Attieh family, from which many of Ferzol's current inhabitants claim descent. The text alleges that the original settlers who gave rise to Ferzol's principal families were descended from migrants from Izraa in the Hauran who belonged to this Attieh family. The first migrants are named as two brothers (Semaan and Rizk) and their cousins (Tanios, Dib, Mrad, Chahin, Boutros, and Ignatius). They settled Ferzol in the mid-to-late 15th century, and were later joined by close relatives. Their descendants diversified in the following decades and centuries, giving rise to several families in the Beqaa Valley.

In the Ottoman period, many parts of the Beqaa Valley came under the rule of the Harfush dynasty, including Ferzol. Religious persecution under Harfush rule caused frequent strain with the Christian inhabitants of Ferzol. Repeated attacks by the Harfush would drive many of Ferzol's inhabitants to flee, settling other towns in the Beqaa Valley. A notable example was Zahlé, which was founded by settlers from Ferzol and Ablah. Over time, descendants of the individuals who fled returned to the town. This gave rise to the diversification of family lines in Ferzol, with different families being identified by nicknames or the first names of their paternal ancestors.

In 1724, Ferzol was affected by the schism within the Greek Orthodox Church, which led to the creation of the Melkite Greek Catholic Church. When the Melkites of the Levant were recognized as being in full communion with the Catholic Church, most of the Christians in Ferzol voiced their agreement with this decision. From this point forward, the Archeparchy of Zahle and Forzol became a religious center in the Beqaa Valley, with Ferzol retaining its historical identification as the see's origin.

==== Conflict with Ahmad al-Jazzar ====
In 1791, the Harfush prince Jahjah ibn Mustafa planned to occupy Baalbek and expel the army of Ahmed Pasha al-Jazzar, who was the Ottoman governor of the region. Various men from Zahlé and the surrounding towns were recruited by Jahjah with the intention of raiding Baalbek. Together, they coordinated a surprise attack that overwhelmed the forces of al-Jazzar, forcing the survivors to flee to Damascus and solidifying the control of the Harfush dynasty in Zahlé. This would lead to a series of conflicts between the Harfush dynasty and the allies of al-Jazzar. Due to its central location within the Beqaa Valley, Ferzol found itself in the midst of these conflicts. In 1793, the prince Jahjah was in Qab Elias with some men. Al-Jazzar sent word to his army in the region, and ordered them to capture him. Although Jahjah fled north, the army pursued him. While en route, they looted Ferzol and Ablah, killed some local shepherds, and sent their heads to al-Jazzar. He was reportedly overcome with rage, and demanded that they leave the Beqaa Valley. These incidents were commonplace within Ferzol, contributing to the repeated persecution of its people and the destruction of the town.

==== Sectarian violence and end of Harfush rule ====
Although the late eighteenth and early nineteenth centuries saw the return of former refugees to Ferzol, conflict between various religious sects was still commonplace. In 1838, Eli Smith noted that Ferzol's population was mostly Catholic. This often drew conflict with the surrounding inhabitants of the Beqaa Valley, who were Shia Muslims and allies of the Harfush dynasty. One example of this was the civil conflict of Mount Lebanon and Damascus in 1860, which led to the massacre of many Christians in Ferzol. Shortly after, the last Harfush emirs were exiled by the Ottoman government, which ended several hundred years of Harfush rule within the Beqaa Valley.

==== The Mutasarrifate and World War I ====
The aftermath of 1860 brought the establishment of the Mutasarrifate of Mount Lebanon, which created a semi-autonomous Christian-majority region within the Ottoman Empire. However, this did not include Ferzol, which was still under the administration of the Ottoman province of Syria. Within this period, Ferzol continued to face raids from external forces, due to its location within Ottoman territory. The inhabitants of Ferzol would come into conflict with these forces, as well as the wealthier inhabitants of Zahlé. The repeated destruction of the town and the attacks on its inhabitants kept it smaller than Zahlé and economically subordinate.

Increased economic strife towards the end of the nineteenth century would spur many of Ferzol's inhabitants to migrate to other countries, with most traveling to the United States and Brazil. Many of these immigrants would earn a living by peddling in cities or among farms in rural areas. Those who found success would then transition toward running their own small businesses. Regular communication was maintained between immigrants and those who stayed in Ferzol, with many sending gifts or other remittances back home.

During World War I, food within Lebanon was scarce due to seizure by Ottoman authorities who wished to feed their troops. This caused mass starvation in Mount Lebanon, which spurred many Maronites in the region to travel to the Beqaa Valley in search of food. After the war, many of them would settle in Ferzol, which contributed to the newfound growth of the town's population.

=== Modern period ===
Today, Ferzol is located within the Zahlé District, which is now part of Lebanon. The town is known for its agrarian economy and historical features, which include the caves of Wadi al-Habis. The region is also covered with wild almond, pine, oak, and cypress trees, which are protected by locals. The inhabitants of Ferzol are predominantly Melkite Greek Catholic, with a noticeable minority of Maronites. The town is known for its production of arak, as well as various agricultural products.

== Geography ==
Ferzol is situated within the Beqaa Valley, lying a few kilometers north of Zahlé. A small stream separates the town into two regions, Harat al-Fawqa (the upper quarter) and Harat al-Tahta (the lower quarter). The latter is the original settlement of the town, and the upper quarter was created after its inhabitants sought independence due to internal conflicts. Despite this, both quarters still constitute a single municipality.

The primary crops grown in Ferzol are grapes and cherries, with many local hills being covered in grapevines and similar plants. The town lies around 1,000 meters above sea level, and is nearly equidistant from Beirut and Damascus.

=== Wadi al-Habis ===
The Wadi al-Habis cave complex encompasses a range of features that indicate successive phases of human activity. Immediately in front of the main cave cluster, at the base of the cliff face, the rock has been cut to form a square courtyard accessed by four carved steps leading into a large hall. Adjacent features include a channel carved into the rock face connecting a spring (located above the caves) to the various chambers through a distributary system, an engineering detail that indicates organized communal use of the complex over an extended period. A distinct feature of the complex is a niche carved amove the entrance of the largest cave, inside which a conical carved stone object is visible. Its form is consistent with pre-Roman Semitic cultic traditions that avoided human representation in sacred imagery. Approximately twenty minutes on foot to the north of the main cave cluster, the cliff face of Jabal al-Habis preserves the remains of an ancient quarry and a group of carved stone reliefs.

== Demographics ==
As of 2004, Ferzol had a population of 2,217 people, mostly consisting of Christians. Most Christians in the town belong to Melkite Greek Catholic and Maronite demoninations. Today, notable families in the town include Chabbouh, Chehade, Daher, Farah, Gerges, Ghassan, Hanna, Issa, Mansour, Mhanna, Mina, Nasrallah, Saba, Sayde, Zammar, and many others. Most people in Ferzol are descendants of the Attieh family.

== People ==
- Elie Ferzli, Lebanese lawyer and politician
- Hana Ghassan, Lebanese-Brazilian politician and vice governor of Pará
- Ignatius Firzli, Lebanese priest and theologian
- Joseph of Damascus, Lebanese priest and educator
- Michel Daher, Lebanese politician and philanthropist
- Najwa Massad, Lebanese-American business woman and politician

== See also ==
- Zahlé District
- Beqaa Governorate
- Melkite Greek Catholic Church
- Beqaa Valley
- Temples of the Beqaa Valley
- Attieh family
