= Bodybuilding at the 2011 Arab Games =

Bodybuilding at the 2011 Pan Arab Games
- Venue: Al Dana Hall
- Location: Doha, Qatar
- Dates: 10 December

At the 2011 Pan Arab Games, the bodybuilding events were held at Al Dana Hall in Doha, Qatar on 10 December. A total of 8 events were contested though dropped to 7 due to doping incidents.

== Medal summary ==
=== Men ===
Event	Gold	Silver	Bronze
-65 kg	Mahdy Hassan (IRQ)	Jabor Alkuwari (QAT)	Vacant
-75 kg	Ali Jowaied (IRQ)	Mahmoud Ammar (PLE)	Vacant
-80 kg	Hussen Abdulla (LBA)	Jasim Hasan (KUW)	Sami Zayed (LBA)
-85 kg	Mohammad Alrashed (KUW)	Ahmed Al-Banai (QAT)	Vacant
-90 kg	Mohamed Abdalrheem (EGY)	Abdallah Al Rahbi (OMA)	Mohanad Faqih (PLE)
-100 kg	Petros Vyzantios (PLE)	Ahmad Naji Alsaafeen (JOR)	Anas Haj Hassan (LIB)
+100 kg	Attia Shaalan (EGY)	Nayef Abdulla (QAT)	Mahmoud Marzouq (PLE)

== Doping ==
A major case of doping was found in Bodybuilding where ten athletes were caught using performance enhancing drugs.

Event	Name	Country	Original Medal
Men's -65 kg	Mohammad Alkhadi	Jordan	Gold
Men's -70 kg	Wahid Al-Sowaidi	Qatar	Gold
Men's -70 kg	Ahmed Jabar	Iraq	Silver
Men's -70 kg	Abdulaziz Bumejaid	Bahrain	Bronze
Men's -75 kg	Walid Mal Allah	Qatar	Gold
Men's -75 kg	Hosney Merawah	Jordan	Bronze
Men's -80 kg	Mahmoud Al Fdali	Egypt	Gold
Men's -85 kg	Jalaal Alrayashi	Qatar	Gold
Men's -90 kg	Kamal Abdullrahman	Qatar	Gold
Men's -100 kg	Moustafa Aziz Nesim	Egypt	Gold

The Men's -70 kg was no longer a medaling event as all competitors tested positive. The lower ranked athletes have since been upgraded, however in some events there were not enough participants for bronze medalists.

== Medal table ==
* Host nation (Qatar)

Rank	Nation	Gold	Silver	Bronze	Total
1	Egypt	2	0	0	2
1	Iraq	2	0	0	2
3	Palestine	1	1	2	4
4	Kuwait	1	1	0	2
5	Libya	1	0	1	2
6	Qatar*	0	3	0	3
7	Jordan	0	1	0	1
7	Oman	0	1	0	1
9	Lebanon	0	0	1	1
Totals (9 entries)		7	7	4	18
