= Orquevaux =

- Commune
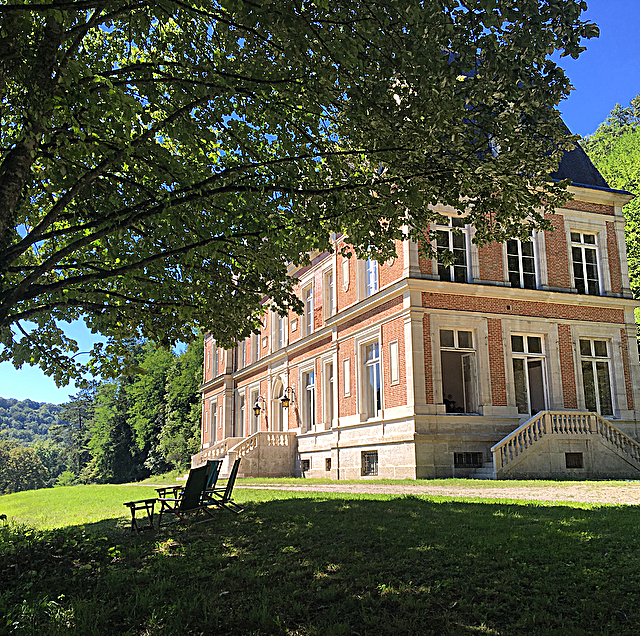
- Château d'Orquevaux
- Location of Orquevaux
- Location within France Location within Grand Est
- Coordinates: 48°18′07″N 5°23′56″E
- Country: France
- Region: Grand Est
- Department: Haute-Marne
- Arrondissement: Chaumont
- Canton: Poissons

Government
  - Mayor (2020–2026): Mathieu Caussin
- Area^{1}: 15.7 km^{2} (6.1 sq mi)
- Elevation: 298 m (978 ft)
- Population (2023): 70
  - Density: 4.5/km^{2} (12/sq mi)
- Time zone: UTC+01:00 (CET)
  - Summer (DST): UTC+02:00 (CEST)
- INSEE/Postal code: 52369 /52700
- ^{1} French Land Register data, which excludes lakes, ponds, glaciers > 1 km^{2} (0.386 sq mi or 247 acres) and river estuaries.

Orquevaux (French pronunciation: [ɔʁkəvo]) is a commune in the Haute-Marne department in the Grand Est region in Northeastern France. As of 2023, the population of the commune was 70.

== Geography ==
The village of Orquevaux is considered one of the most beautiful villages in the Champagne-Ardenne area with its Napoleon III style Château d'Orquevaux sitting on the hilltop. Since 2017 artists from all over the world have attended the Château d'Orquevaux International Artist Residency.

== See also ==
- Communes of the Haute-Marne department
