= Najwa Massad =

Mayor of the city of Mankato, Minnesota

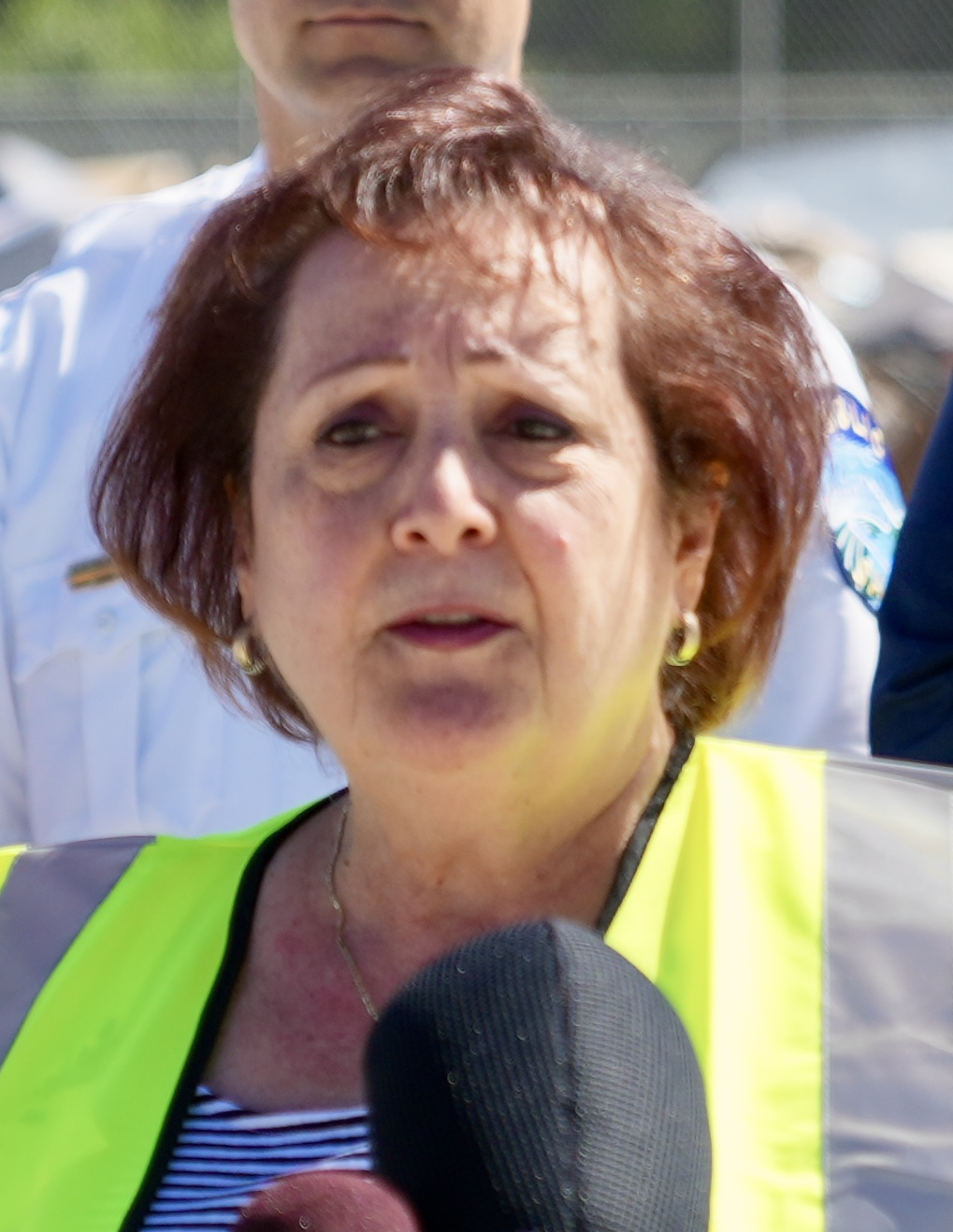
- Massad in 2024

Mayor of Mankato, Minnesota
- Incumbent
- Assumed office November 6, 2018
- Preceded by: Eric Anderson

Personal details
- Born: Najwa Melhem Chalhoub; September 20, 1955 (age 71) Ferzol, Lebanon
- Party: Democratic
- Education: Good Counsel Academy

Najwa Melhem Massad, née Chalhoub (born September 20, 1955) is a Lebanese-American business woman and politician serving as the 46th mayor of the city of Mankato, Minnesota, since 2018. Massad has been a restaurateur and caterer since the late 1970s in both Lebanon and the United States. She is the first female mayor of Mankato, its first first-generation American mayor as well as its second mayor of Lebanese origin, after Herb Mocol (1975-1986).

== Early life ==
Massad was born in the Beqaa Valley, Lebanon, in September 1955. Her father, Melhem Tom Chalhoub of Ferzol and her mother Elaine Chalhoub, née Bouich, of Zahle immigrated to the United States in 1960, to reunite with Massad's grandmother. They settled in the city of Mankato, Minnesota where Massad attended St. John's Catholic school and then Our Lady of Good Counsel Academy for Girls high school until the age of 15.

== Career ==
Locally, Massad is best known for her involvement in the food industry, along with her husband, John Massad, which started in 1984. Fleeing the Lebanese Civil War in 1982, they settled back to Mankato. They opened their first restaurant called Meray's shortly after. The business specialized in Middle Eastern, Mediterranean and French cookery. They introduced Mankato to the world-famous shawarma. The sit-down restaurant closed in 1995. Their company, Massad Group, included as of 2022, Massad's Mediterranean Grille (a shawarma stand at the RIver Hills Mall), Najwa's Catering (specialized in Lebanese and French cuisines located at the Mayo Clinic Health System Event Center) and Olives (a Mediterranean family-style restaurant in the lobby of the downtown Mankato Hilton Garden Inn hotel). Massad Group also mass produces and distributes the brand's signature toum sauce which they call “Schwarma Sauce”.

== Early political career ==
Besides the food industry, Massad has been involved in the Mankato community for some time. She spent 15 years serving on the city's Planning and Zoning Committee, both as a member and chair, and also spent over five years on the Multi-Modal Transportation Committee.

She is also an active member of her church, St. John the Baptist Catholic Church, for which she helped raise funds for the building's renovations in 2012.

== Mayor of Mankato ==
Massad was elected mayor of the city of Mankato on November 6, 2018. She ran again, successfully, for a second term at the subsequent election on November 8, 2022. During her time in office, her main focus areas have been affordable housing and retention of talent and youth. She was defeated in 2026 by Julia Hamann.

== Personal life ==
Massad has been married to John Nagib Massad since 1971 whom she met after moving back to Lebanon at the age of 16 following a trip with her family. Together, they have two daughters, Meray, born in Lebanon in 1975 and Karla, born in Mankato in 1978.
