= Atiyah =

Atiyah (Arabic: عطية ‘aṭiyyah), is a unisex given name of Arabic origin. It is also spelt as Atiyeh, Attiah, Attieh, Atieh, Atié, Atiya, Atiyya, Attiya, Attiyah, Attyé, Ateya, Ateah, or Atia. Notable people with the name include:

== Given name ==
=== Ateya ===
- Ateya El-Belqasy (born 1984), Egyptian footballer
- Ateyah Al-Shaari, Libyan rebel leader

=== Atia ===
- Atia Abawi (born 1982), American author, DEI speaker, and television journalist
- Atia Islam Anne (1962–2026), Bangladeshi artist
- Atia Weekes (born 1980), Canadian sprinter

=== Atiya ===
- Atiya Anisha (born 1999), Bangladeshi playback singer
- Atiya Fyzee (1877–1967), Indian author
- Atiya Iftikhar, Pakistani politician
- Atiyah Abd al-Rahman (1970–2011), Libyan purported militant
- Atiyah ibn Sa'd (died 729), Arab transmitter of hadith
- Shuhdi Atiya ash-Shafi (died 1960), Egyptian communist theoretician and activist

=== Atiye ===
- Atiye (born 1988), Turkish pop singer
- Atiye Sultan (1824–1850), Ottoman princess

=== Atiyya ===
- Atiyyah Ellison (born 1981), American footballer
- Atiyya ibn Salih (died 1073), Mirdasid emir of Aleppo

=== Attiya ===
- Attiya Dawood (born 1958), Pakistani poet, writer, and activist
- Attiya Gamri (born 1972), Dutch politician
- Attiya Inayatullah, Pakistani politician
- Attiya Waris (born 1974), Kenyan academic and reform advocate
- Mullah Attiya al-Jamri (1899–1981), Bahraini khatib and poet

== Surname ==
=== Ateya ===
- Rawya Ateya (1926–1997), Egyptian politician

=== Atiya ===
- Aziz Suryal Atiya (1898–1988), Coptic historian and scholar
- Edward Atiyah (1903–1964), Lebanese writer
- Ignatius III Atiyah (died 1634), Melkite Patriarch of Antioch
- Jarir ibn Atiyah (650–728), Arab poet and satirist
- Sir Michael Atiyah (1929–2019), British mathematician
- Patrick Atiyah (1931–2018), English barrister and legal writer

=== Atiyeh ===
- Dennis Atiyeh (born 1963), Syrian wrestler
- George N. Atiyeh (1923–2008), Lebanese librarian
- Joseph Atiyeh (born 1957), Syrian wrestler
- Victor G. Atiyeh (1923–2014), American politician

=== Atiyya ===
- Ziri ibn Atiyya (died 1001), Maghrawa Berber tribal leader

=== Attieh ===
- Alaa' Attieh (born 1990), Palestinian footballer
- Joseph Attieh (born 1986), Lebanese singer
- Rania Attieh, Lebanese-American filmmaker
- Rouwaida Attieh (born 1982), Syrian vocalist

=== Attiya ===
- Abdul Rahman bin Hamad Al Attiyah (born 1950), Qatari diplomat
- Abdullah bin Hamad Al Attiyah (born 1951), Qatari politician
- Abdullah bin Khalid Al Attiyah (born 1953), Qatari banker
- Ezra Attiya (1885–1970), Syrian Sephardic Torah teacher
- Hamad bin Ali Al Attiyah, Qatari politician
- Khaled al-Attiyah (born 1949), Iraqi politician
- Khalid bin Mohammad Al Attiyah (born 1967), Qatari politician
- Mohammed Attiyah (born 1992), Saudi footballer
- Nasser Al-Attiyah (born 1970), Qatari rally driver and sport shooter
- Saad Attiya (born 1987), Iraqi footballer

=== Attyé ===
- Assane Attyé (born 1983), French singer of Lebanese origin known as Ycare

== See also ==
- Atia (disambiguation)
- Atias
- Attia
- Attias
- Attieh family
