= Atias =

Atias is a surname. Notable people with the surname include:

- Ariel Atias (born 1970), Israeli politician
- Elan Atias (born 1975), American singer
- Moran Atias (born 1981), American actress and model
- Ron Atias (born 1975), Israeli taekwondoist

== See also ==
- Attia
- Atia (disambiguation)
- Attias
- Ateas
- Atiyah
