= Assistive Technology Industry Association =

Organization of manufacturers and sellers

The Assistive Technology Industry Association (ATIA) is a not-for-profit membership organization of manufacturers, sellers and providers of technology-based assistive devices and/or services, for people with disabilities. ATIA represents the interests of its members to business, government, education, and the many agencies that serve people with disabilities. One goal of the ATIA is to "speak with the common voice" for Its mission is to serve as the collective voice of the Assistive Technology (AT) industry so that the best products and services are delivered to people with disabilities.

Founded in 1998, ATIA is governed by a 10-member Board of Directors. ATIA has over 120 individual and corporate members. Its offices are located in Chicago, Illinois.

Since 1999, ATIA has held annual conferences that provide forums for education and communication to professional practitioners serving those with disabilities. The annual conferences are also open to people with disabilities, their caregivers, their family members, and members of the general public. In 2009, ATIA began providing educational online webinars to serve these groups. ATIA has also held conferences in collaboration with the Job Accommodation Network and United States Business Leadership Network (USBLN). The published result of one such conference is Roadmaps for Enhancing Employment of Persons with Disabilities through Accessible Technology.

== Publications ==
ATIA produces the Assistive Technology Outcomes and Benefits Journal (ATOB) in a collaborative scholarly partnership with the Special Education Assistive Technology Center (SEAT Center) at Illinois State University. ATOB publishes articles related to the outcomes and benefits of assistive technology for persons with disabilities across the lifespan. ATOB is a peer-reviewed annual publication, first published in 2004.

== Industry standard setting ==
ATIA is involved in industry standard setting through its Accessibility Interoperability Alliance (AIA) division. AIA was initiated in 2007 as an independent organization by a group of leading Information Technology (IT) and Assistive Technology (AT) companies, content providers, and other key engineering organizations. Since then they have been working to develop standards and collaborate on the creation of solutions to long-standing compatibility problems that hinder the development of accessibility solutions for people with disabilities. In 2010 AIA become a technical and engineering division within ATIA.

== Partners ==
ATIA partners with other organizations in the technology and disability fields to promote adoption and awareness of the ways that technology can benefit people with disabilities. Alliance Partners are:

- Alliance for Technology Access (ATA)
- American Federation for the Blind (AFB)
- American Occupational Therapy Association (AOTA)
- American Speech-Language-Hearing Association (ASHA)
- Assistive Technology in Higher Education Network (ATHEN)
- Association of Assistive Technology Act Programs (ATAP)
- Association on Higher Education and Disability (AHEAD)
- Center for Applied Special Technology (CAST)
- The Chicago Lighthouse
- DAISY Consortium
- Easter Seals
- Employment Resources, Inc. (ERI)
- Florida Diagnostic and Learning Resources System (FDLRS)
- Iowa Braille School (IBS)
- National Assistive Technology Technical Assistance Partnership (NATTAP)
- National Technical Institute for the Deaf (NTID)
- Pass It On Center (PIOC)
- Rehabilitation Engineering and Assistive Technology Society of North America (RESNA)
- State Leaders in Assistive Technology in Education (SLATE)
- The Technology and Media Division (TAM) of the Council for Exceptional Children (CEC)
