= Publius Attius Atimetus =

Ancient Roman physician

Publius Attius Atimetus was a physician of the Atia gens from ancient Rome, who lived in the 1st century CE. He was the court physician to the Roman emperor Augustus. Little is known about his life, though there are multiple mentions of an "Atimetus" (or sometimes "Atimetrus") in some medical capacity who may or may not be the same person.

Some writers suppose that he is the same person who was a contemporary of Scribonius Largus (court physician of the emperor Claudius), who describes a man with this name as being the slave of a physician named Cassius. The medical writer Galen quotes a man named "Atimetrus" (Ἀτιμητρος) who is supposed to be the same person as this.

There is an epitaph preserved of a woman named Claudia Homonoea, who was the wife of an Atimetus, who is described as the freedman of Pamphilus (possibly the physician Gaius Hostius Pamphilus), which was published by Pieter Burman the Younger in his Latin Anthology, and is in the form of a dialogue, partly in Latin and partly in Greek, between Homonoea and her husband. This Atimetus is supposed by some writers to have been the same as the slave of Cassius, mentioned by Scribonius. The 16th century philologist Justus Lipsius imagined both to be the same as Atimetus, the freedman of Domitia, aunt of the emperor Nero; but there is no academic consensus on this point.

Scholars believe a physician of the same name, who is mentioned in an ancient inscription with the title of Archiater, is probably a different person, and lived later than the reign of Augustus.
