= Château d'Orquevaux =

Coordinates: 48°17′55″N 5°23′44″E

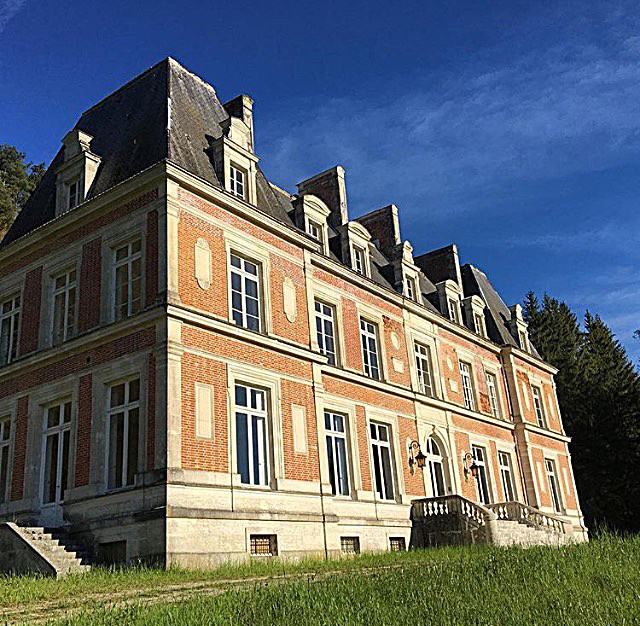
- Main facade of the Château d'Orquevaux
- Interactive map of the Château d'Orquevaux area

General information
- Type: Château
- Architectural style: Napoleon III style
- Location: 18 Grande Rue Orquevaux 52700, Orquevaux, France

Chateau de Orquevaux (French pronunciation: [ʃɑ.to də‿ɔʁkəvo]) is a French château and a historical landmark. It is a private home and an international Artists & Writers residency. It is located in Orquevaux—a commune in the Haute-Marne department, Champagne-Ardenne in north-eastern France.

== History ==
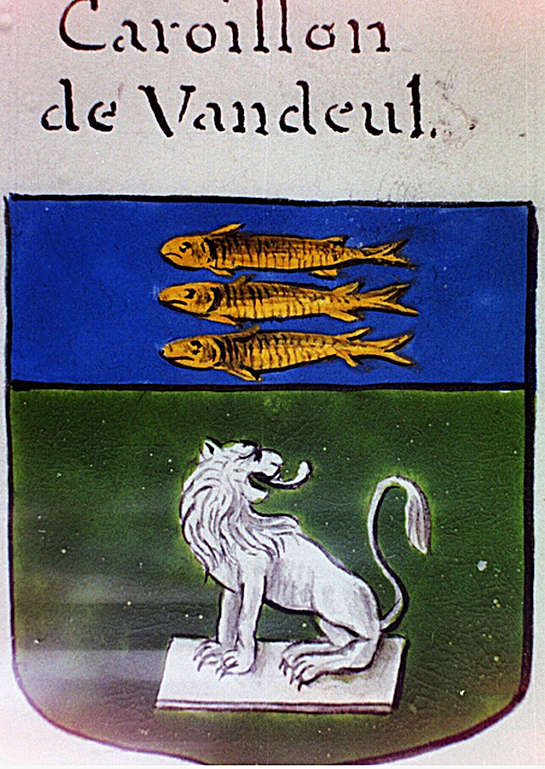
Caroillon de Vandeul Family crest

In the 1760s Abel Caroillon de Vandeul acquired the Chateau and surrounding grounds, as well as a farm, furnace, and metal forge. His son Denis was a master blacksmith and French politician. After Abel Caroillon de Vandeul's acquisition of these properties, his son Denis managed the forge in Orquevaux.

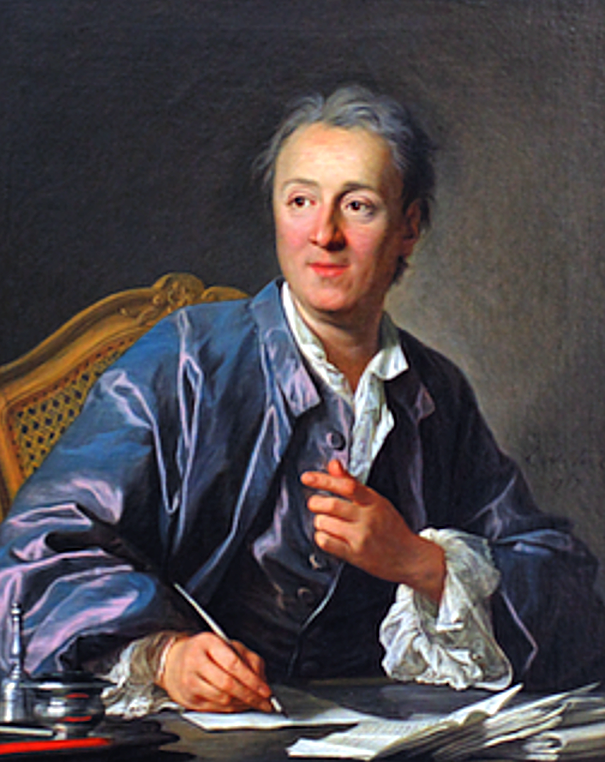
Denis Diderot—Philosopher (1713–1784)

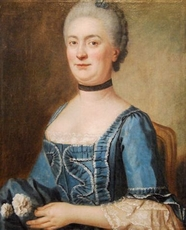
Marie-Angelique Diderot (1753–1824)

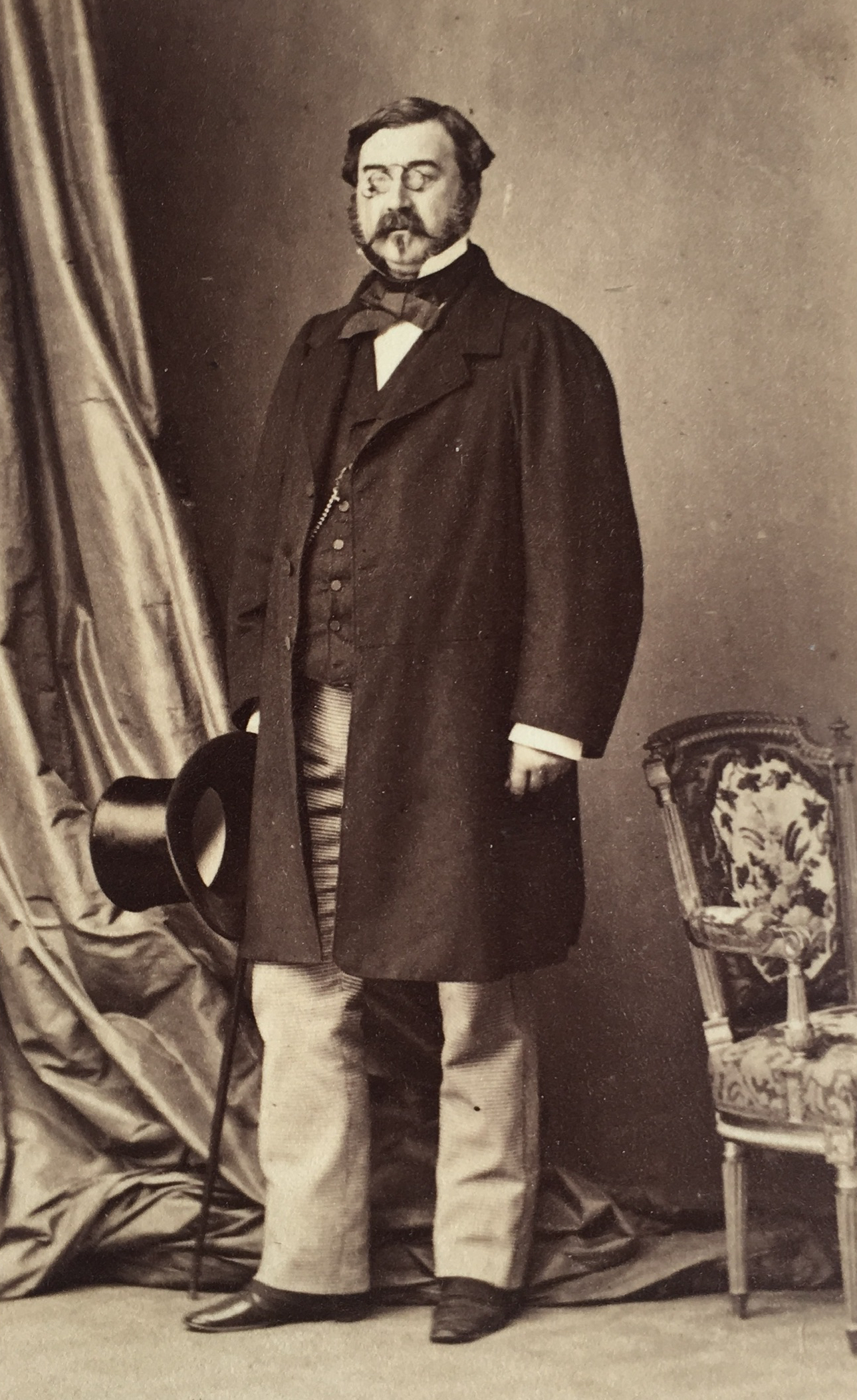
Eugene Abel Francois Caroillon du Vandeul (1812–1870). He was an industrialist and politician, grandson of Abel Vandeul and great-grandson of Denis Diderot. (photo circa 1860)

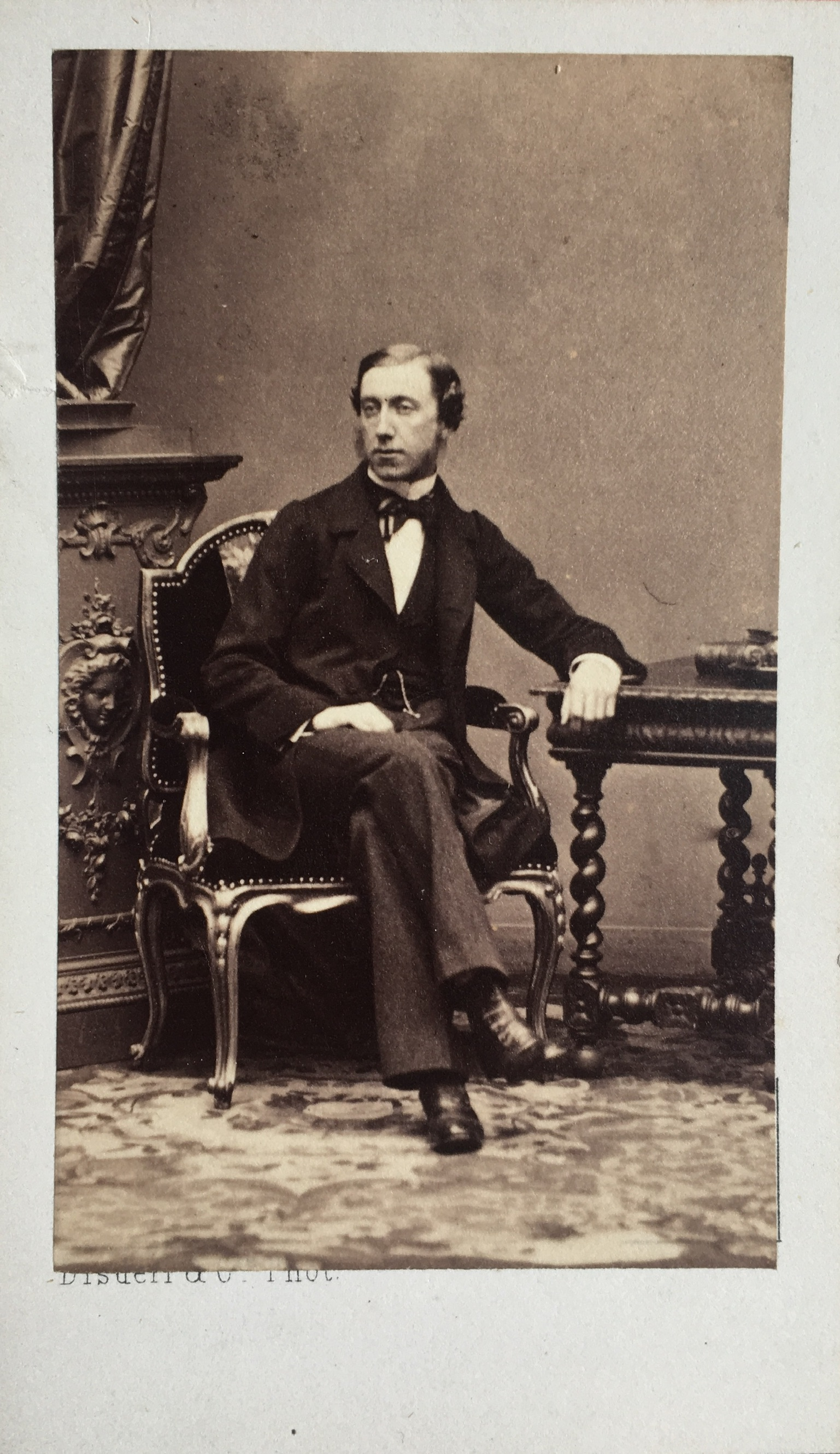
Charles Denis (Albert) du Vandeul (1837–1911), son of Eugene and great-great-grandson of Denis Diderot. He was the fourth-generation proprietor, the last Vandeul in the family line and remaining heir of the Chateau and surrounding property.(Photo circa 1860)

Chateau d'Orquevaux Genealogy
1810–1911 Caroillon de Vandeul
1911–1918 Baron Le Vavasseur
1918–1987 Rothea and de Saint-Exupery (by marriage)
1987–2002 Scheftsik
2002–present Ziggy Attias family

On September 9, 1772 the daughter of Denis Diderot (1713–1784) Marie-Angelique Diderot(1753–1824) married Abel Nicolas Francois Caroillon du Vandeul (1746–1813). Abel and Marie had 2 children: Anne Marie, who died at infancy, and Denis Simon (1775–1850), who was named after his grandfather. The Caroillon du Vandeul family operated the metal forge and stove for around 100 years. It closed in the mid-nineteenth century.

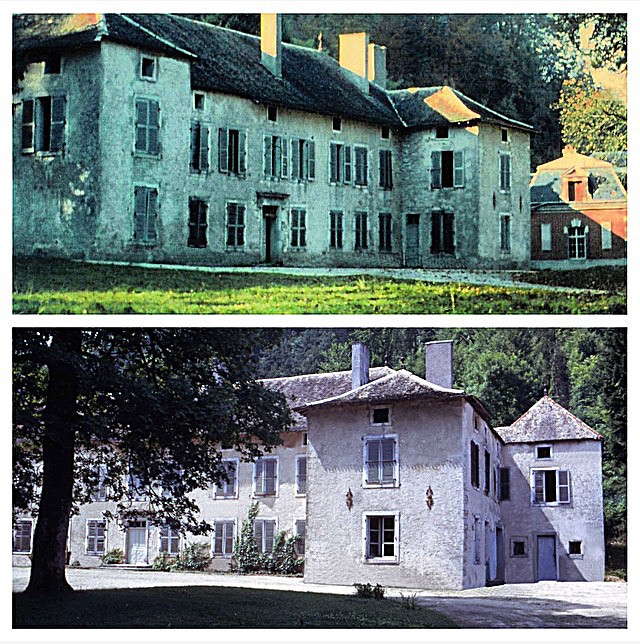
Original Chateau, prior its demolition in 2002

The original Chateau d'Orquevaux was built in the early 1700s in the style of Louis XV. For his uncle Charles Denis (Albert) du Vandeul, Le Baron Jacques Le Vavasseur worked with the architect to design and build the present chateau as a hunting lodge including the Parc grounds, and outbuildings in the style of Napoleon III.

== Vintage Postcards gallery ==
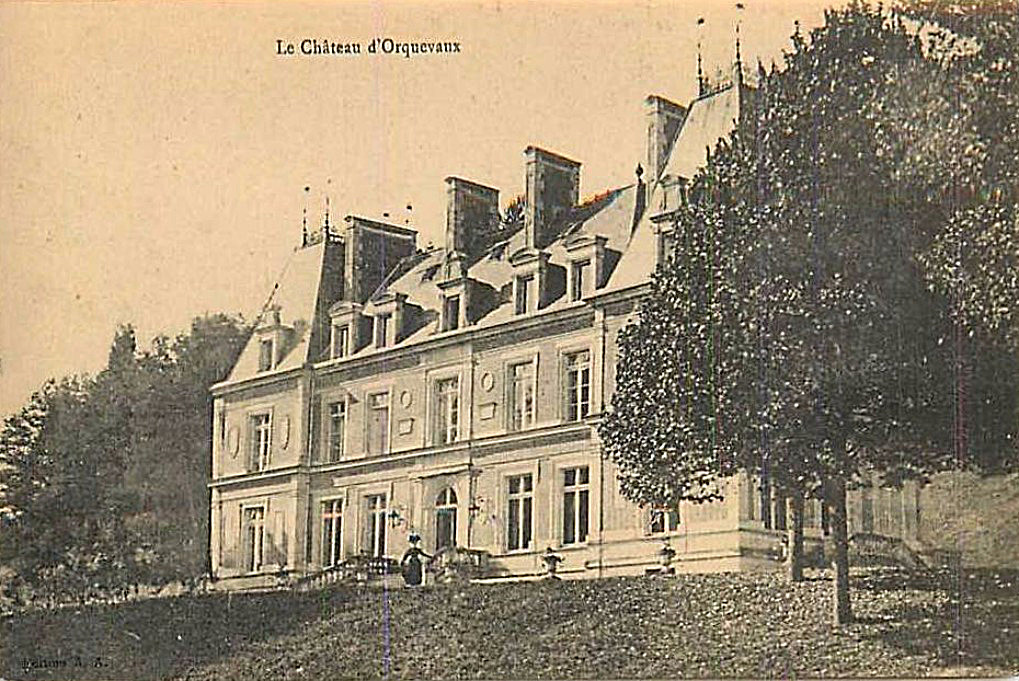
Le Chateau d’Orquevaux (circa 1923)edition AA.

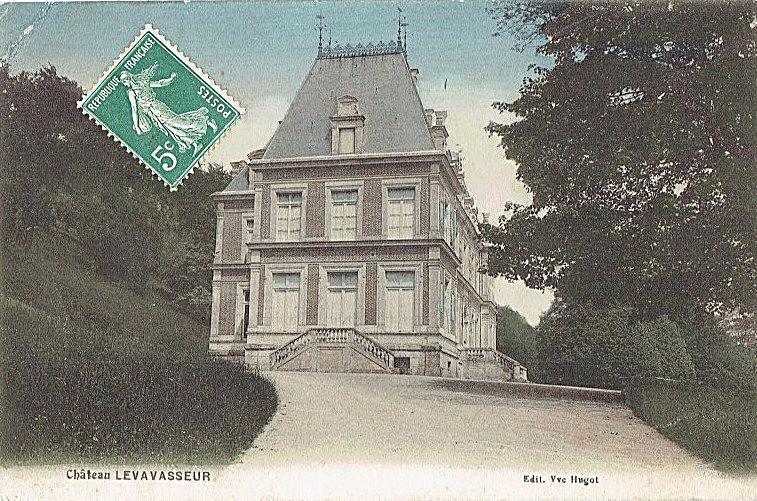
Chateau Levavasseur, photo credit: Vve Huget (circa 1909)

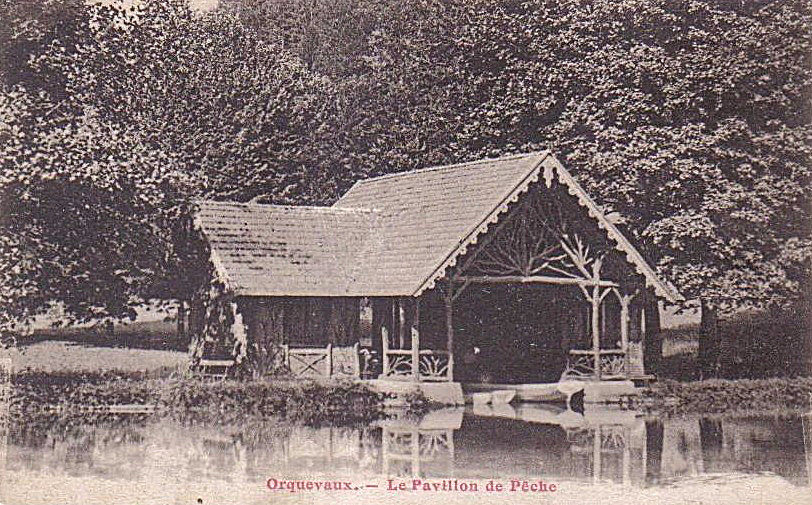
Boathouse Orquevaux - Le Pavillon, de Peche

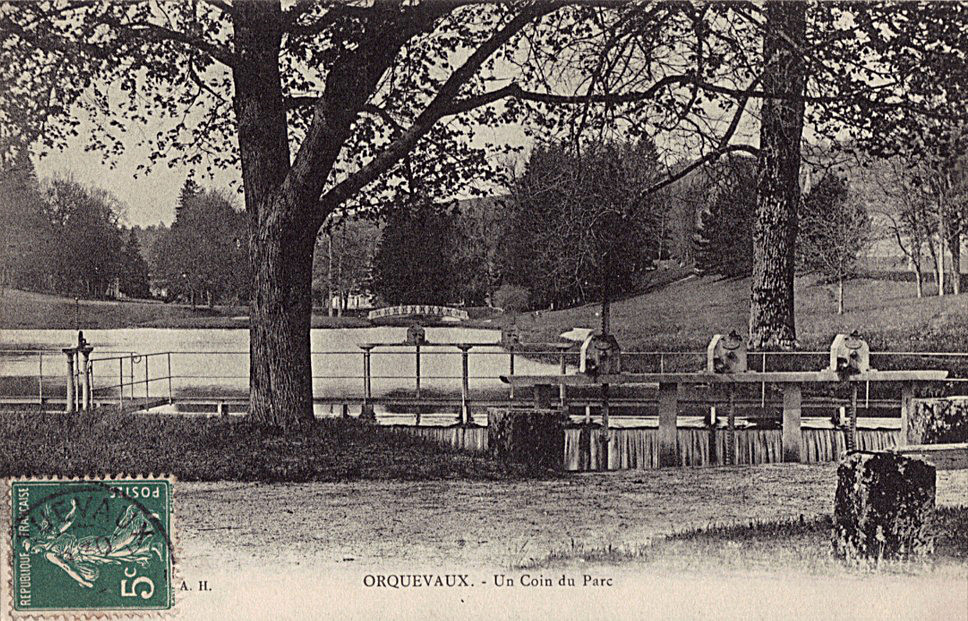
Parc, Orquevaux - Un Coin du Parc photo credit: Vve Hugot - Cliche A. H. (circa 1907)

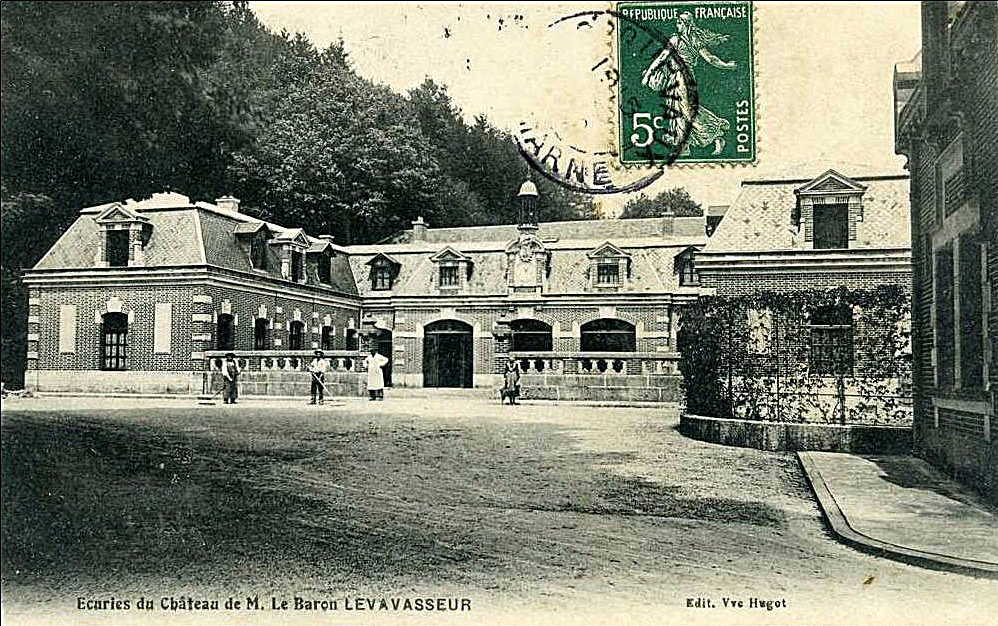
Stables with Staff, Ecuries du Chateau de M. Le Baron Levavasseur. (circa 1905)

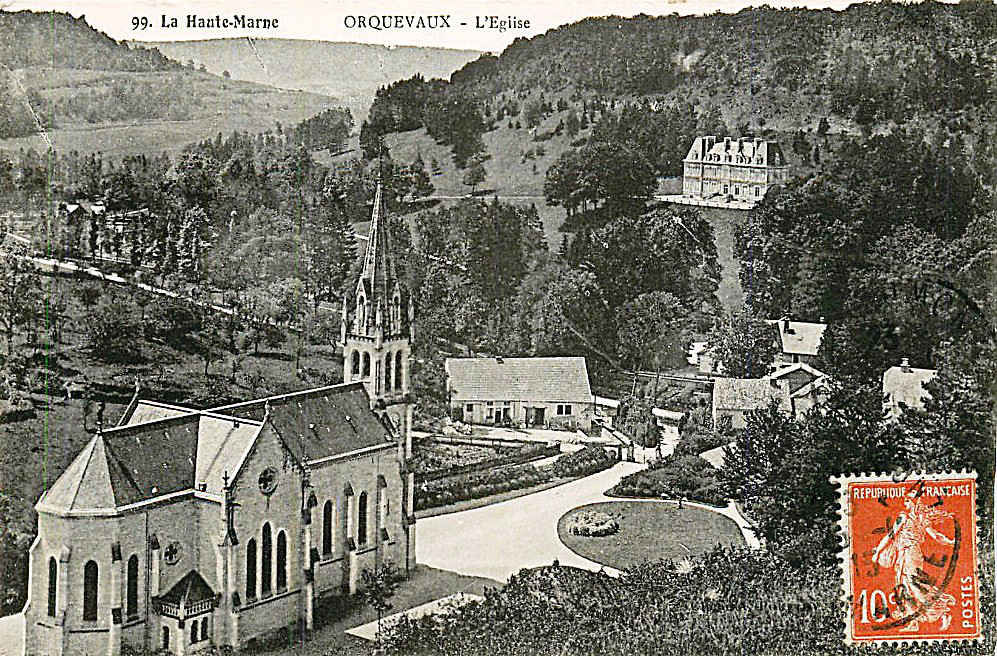
ORQUEVAUX View from the hill behind with the chateau in the distance.

== Present time ==
Château Orquevaux is a private residence now owned by the Attias family. The Chateâu is predominantly used as an artist and writer residency hosting an international arrays of artists from around the world.

== Gallery ==
=== Exterior ===
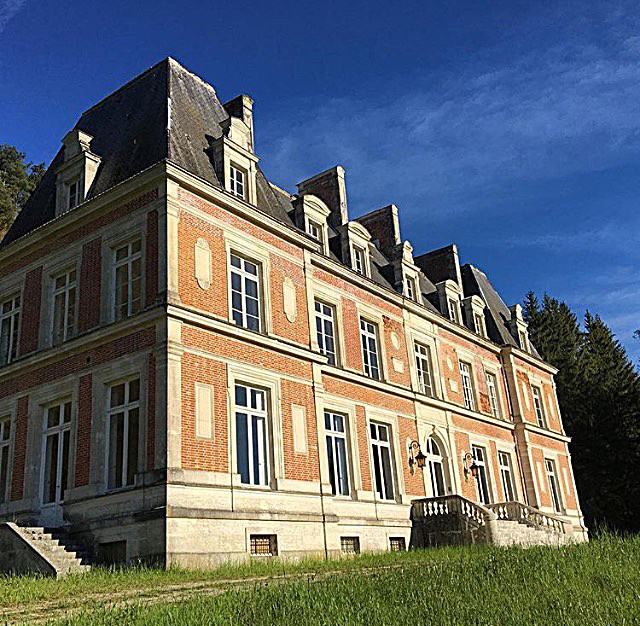
The Chateau de Orquevaux

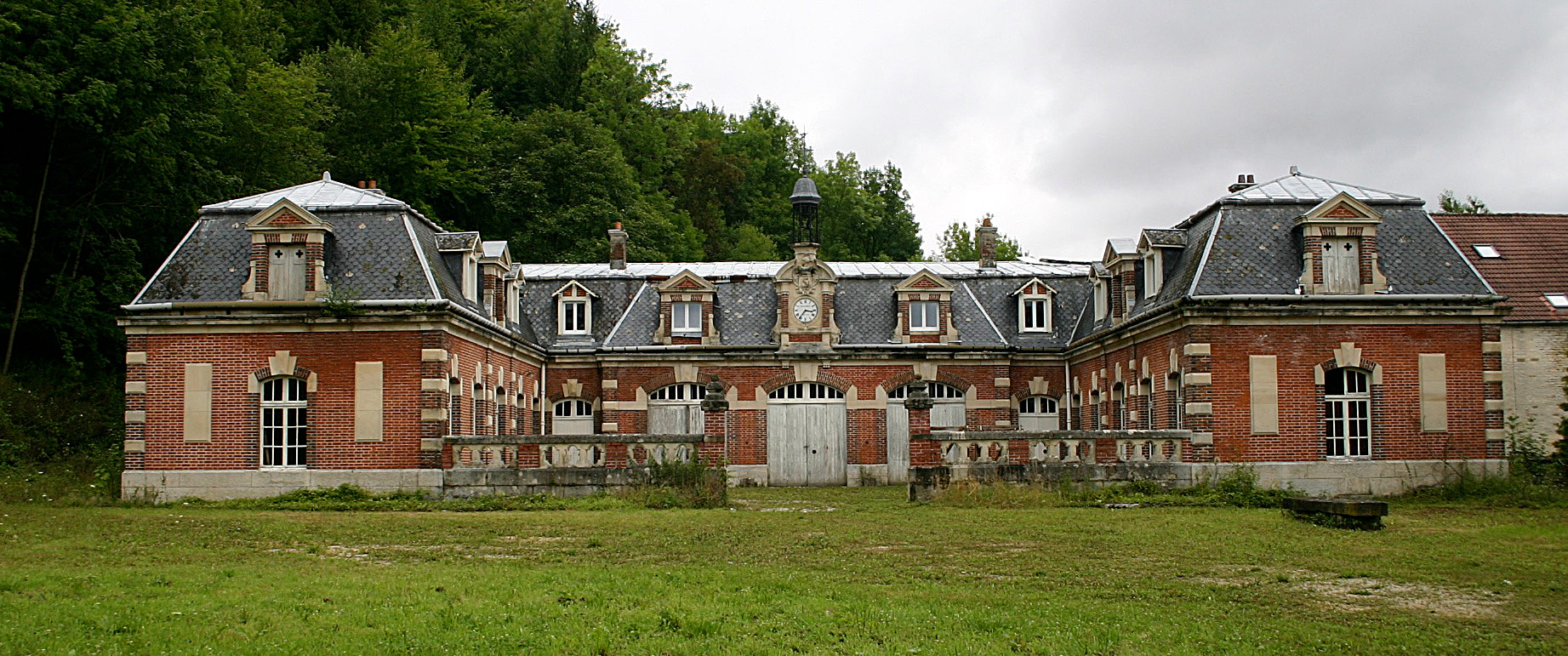
The Stables

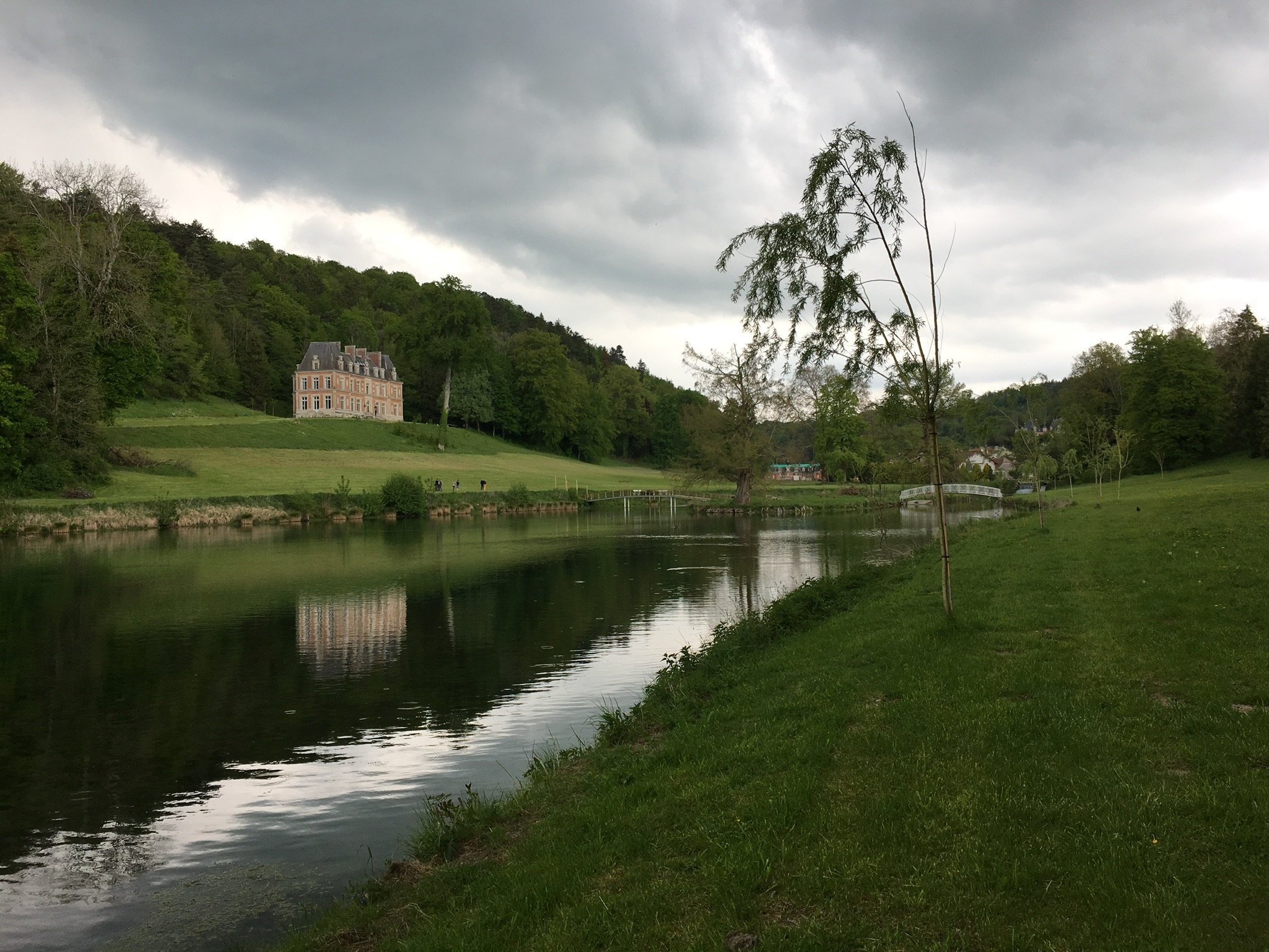
The Park to the Chateau

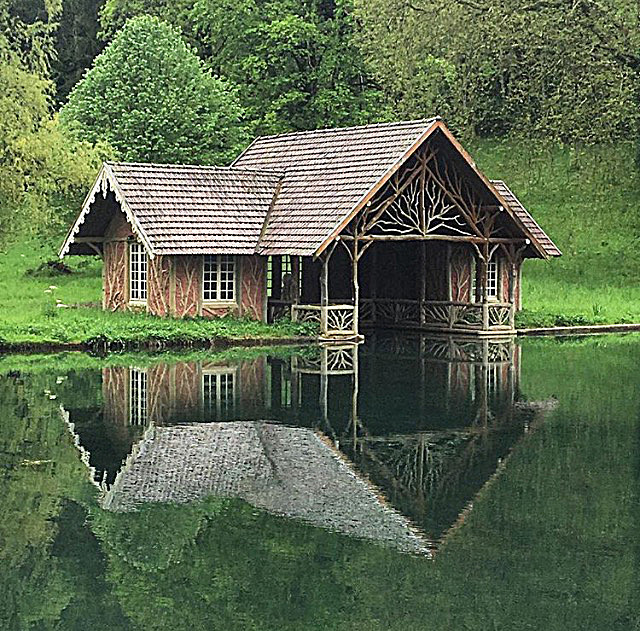
Boathouse

The main Gatehouse and the main entrance

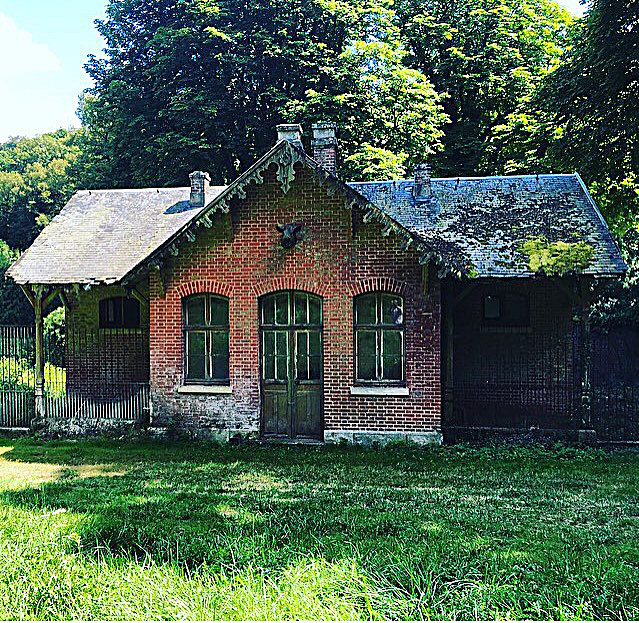
Kennel

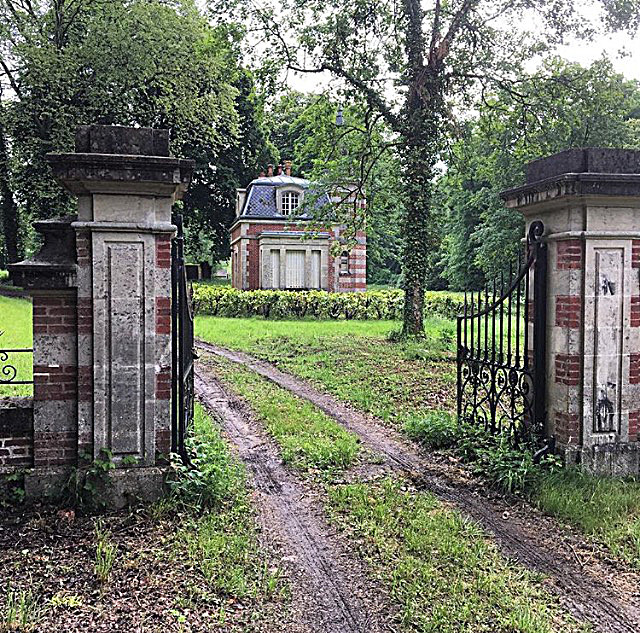
The South Gatehouese

=== Interior ===
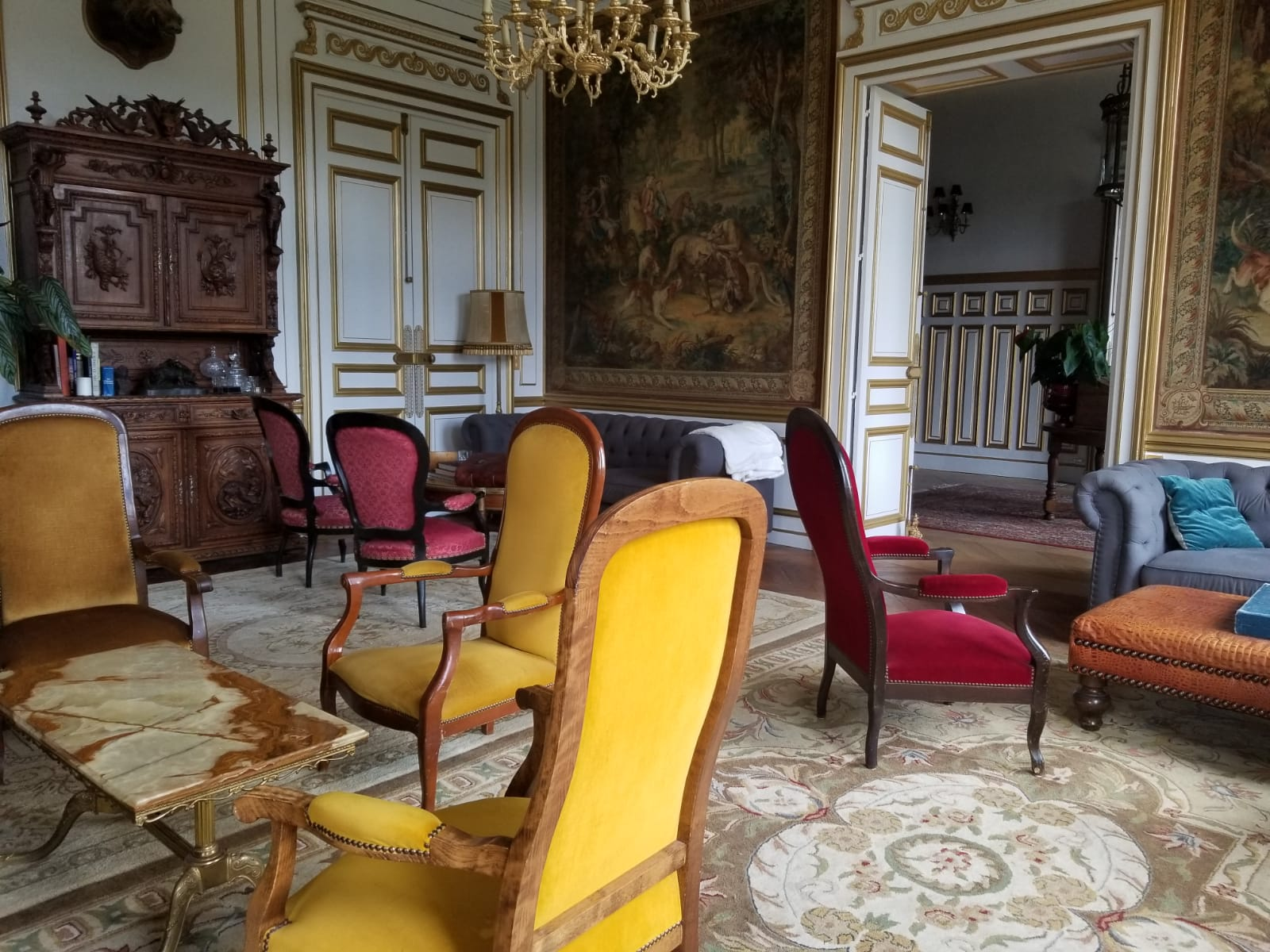
The Hunting Salon

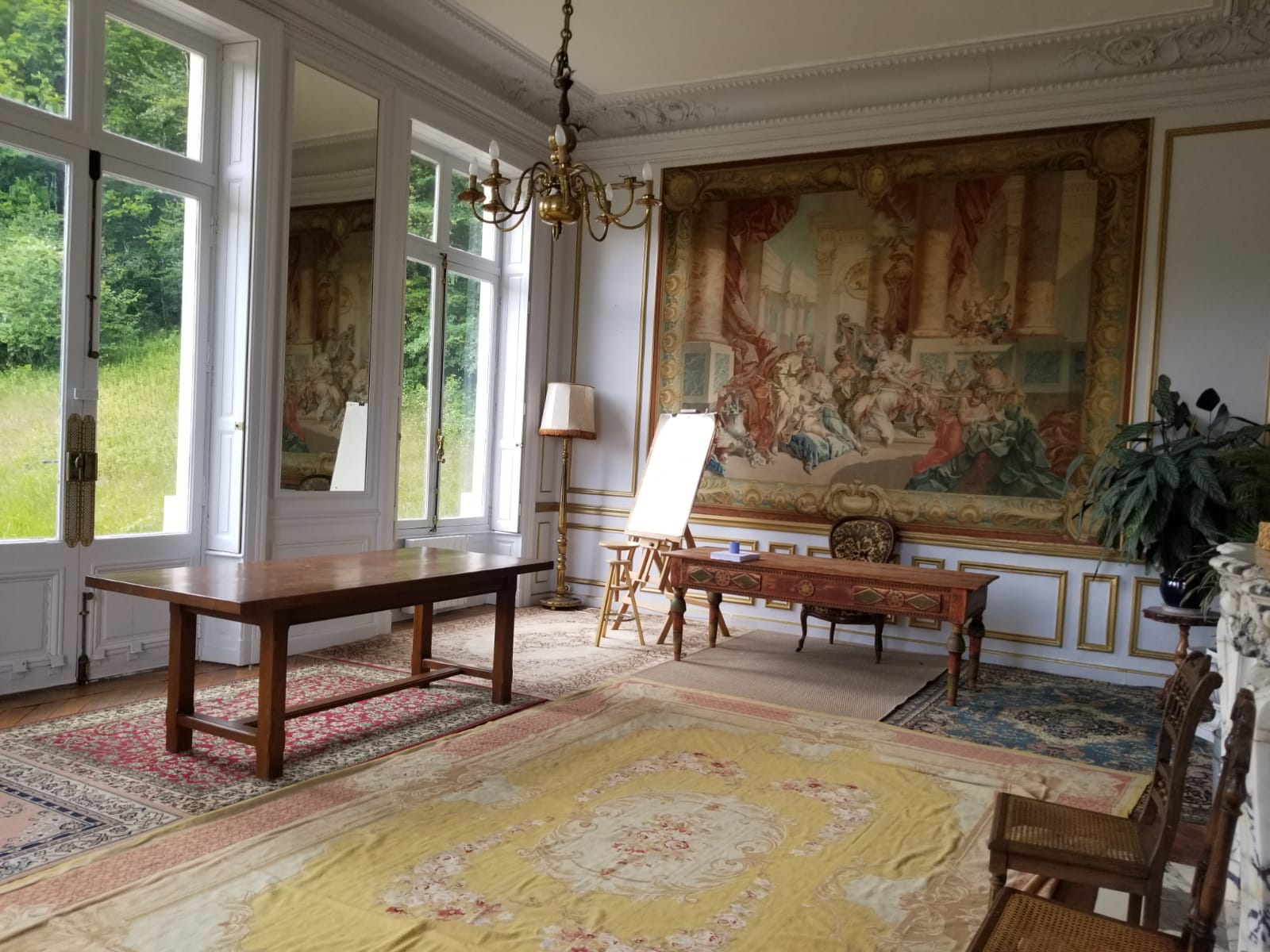
Hunting Salon, Second hall

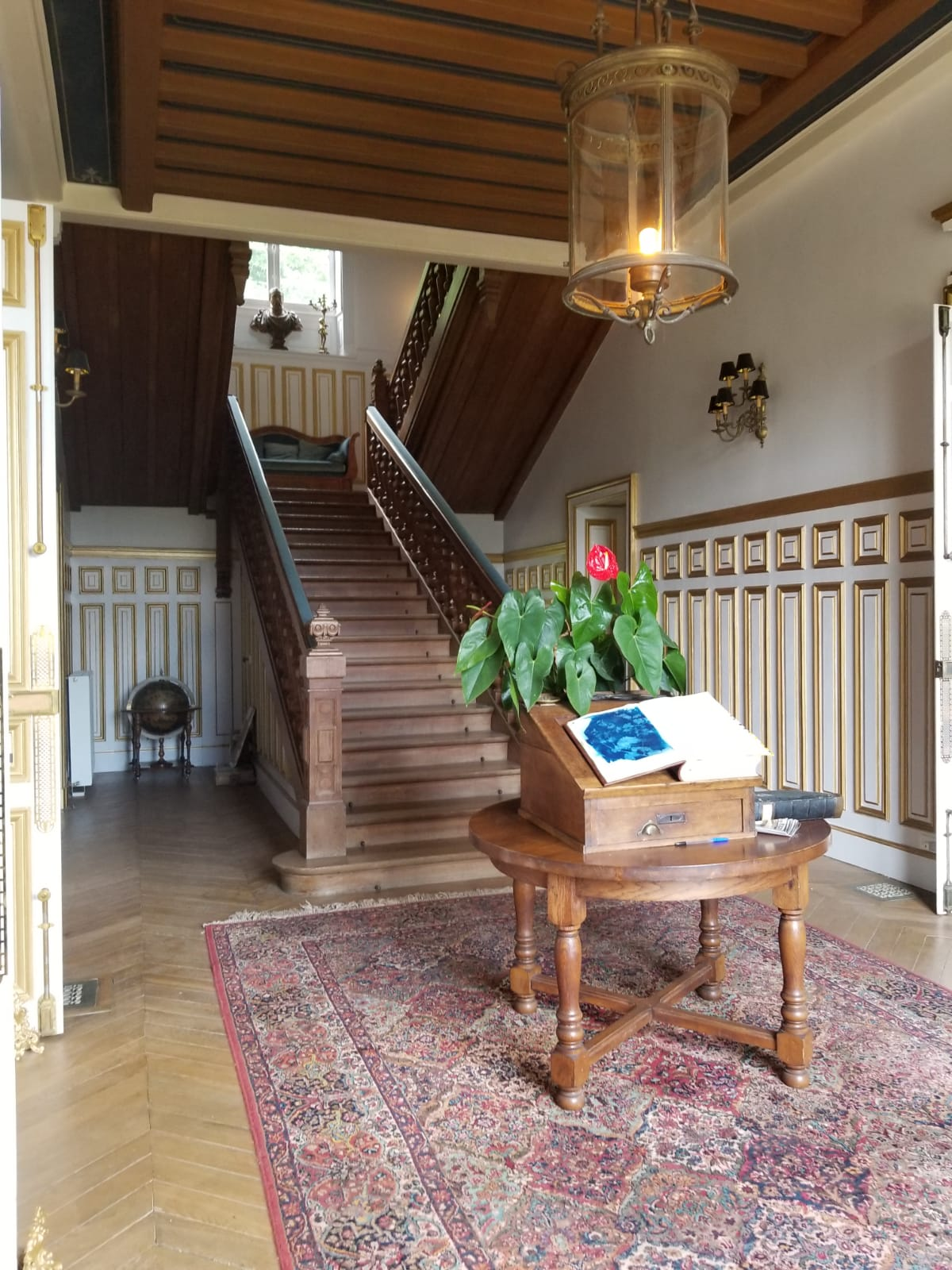
The stairs

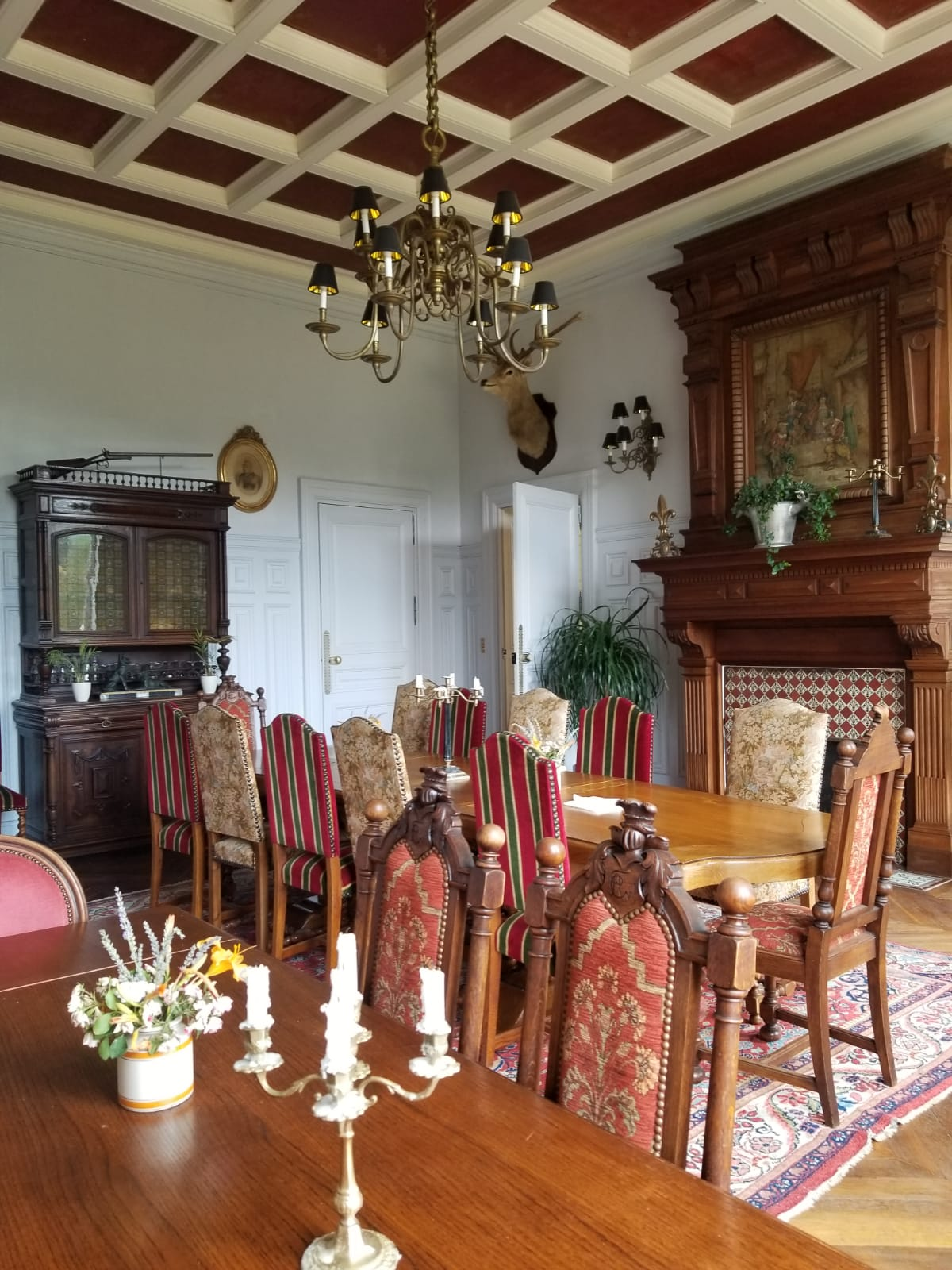
The Living room
