= Sumayeh Attiyeh =

Syrian-born American lecturer (1890–1978)

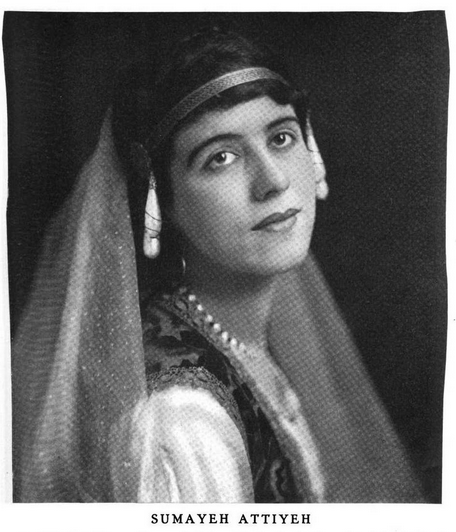
Sumayeh Attiyeh, from a 1919 publication.

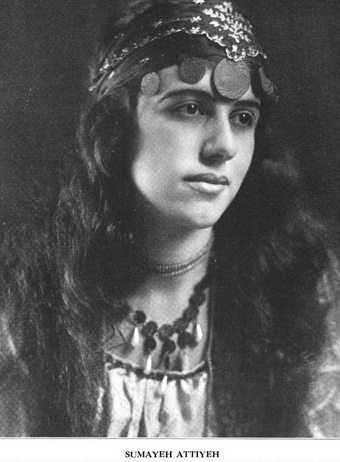
Sumayeh Attiyeh, from a 1919 publication.

Sumayeh Attiyeh (March 21, 1890 — September 1978) was a Syrian-born American lecturer and writer who toured North America on the Chautauqua circuit.

== Early life ==
Sumayeh Attiyeh was born into a prominent Christian family in Tripoli (in present-day Lebanon). Attiyeh's mother Frieda Attiyeh was a translator and writer, and her father was Mathew Attiyeh, a government official; her grandfather was Rev. Joseph Attiyeh. Her sister Sameera Sleyman was a poet and artist in Brooklyn. Sumayeh Attiyeh attended an American Protestant girls' school in Syria before moving to the United States for further studies.

== Career ==
Attiyeh toured the United States and Canada from about 1916 to 1927, much of that time on the Chautauqua and lyceum circuits, lecturing on the Middle East; She was billed as "the youngest woman lecturer on the continent of America today".

Attiyeh also wrote for newspapers and magazines, including a story collection "Tales and Legends of Araby" (1925–1926). "There is a big hell at the gate of our great country. It is Ellis Island," she started a 1922 essay in the New York Times, after working for weeks, successfully, to prevent her aunt from being deported.

By 1932 she was a social worker in the United States, and known to be interested in Indian independence movement. She gave her talks to women's clubs, schools, churches, and other groups during the 1930s, still dressing in the costume of "a genuine Arabian princess." In 1939 she was on the program at a spiritualist summer camp at Lily Dale, New York.

== Personal life ==
Sumayeh Attiyeh died in 1978, aged 88 years, in St. Petersburg, Florida.
