= Attieh family =

Attieh عطية
- Arab Christian noble family
- Parent family: Ghassanids
- Country: Lebanon and Syria
- Etymology: Derived from the Arabic ʿAṭiyyah (عطية) meaning "gift".
- Place of origin: Balqa, Jordan
- Founded: 436 CE
- Founder: Rašdān al-ʿAṭiyyah
- Historic seat: Izraa, Daraa Governorate, Syria

The Attieh family (Arabic: عطية), also spelled ʿAṭiyyah, Attié, Atiyeh, Atieh, Attiyeh, Attiyah, and Atiyah, is an Arab Christian family that traces its origins to the Hauran region of southern Syria, from which its ancestors migrated to Lebanon in the 15th century following sectarian conflicts in the area. Over subsequent centuries, the family dispersed across Lebanon, Syria, and the Americas, giving rise to numerous collateral families carrying distinct surnames. The Attieh family is associated primarily with the Greek Orthodox and Melkite Greek Catholic rites, though individual branches adopted other religious identities, including Maronite Christianity and Shia Islam.

== Etymology ==
The family name ʿAṭiyyah (Arabic: عطية) is an Arabic masculine given name and noun meaning "gift" or "divine gift," derived from the root ع-ط-و (ʿ-ṭ-w), connoting bestowal or endowment. As a family name, it derives from the eponymous founding ancestor ʿAṭiyyah, son of the prince Rašdān al-ʿAṭiyyah, whose lineage is traced to the Ghassanids. In Lebanon, the name is often rendered phonetically as Attieh, as seen in the name of Joseph Attieh. Over time, numerous branches of the family ceased using the Attieh name entirely, adopting instead the names of prominent individual ancestors, occupational identifiers, or geographic epithets.

== Origins ==
The Attieh family claims descent from a prince named Rašdān al-ʿAṭiyyah of the Banu Azd, who was said to be related to the Ghassanid kings. In the year 436 CE, Rashdan migrated to the Levant with his four sons (Attieh, Ibrahim, 'Abil, and Shabtun). It was through the line of Ibrahim's son Attieh that this family spread to Balqa and the Hauran, remaining incorporated into the Ghassanid kingdom. Historical writings discussing the origins of the Attieh family state that their line traces back to Attieh, who was the grandson of a Ghassanid king named al-Nu'man.

Following the Muslim conquest of the Levant, the Attieh family settled in Balqa, in modern-day Jordan. At this point, their presence in the historical record is largely scarce. By the late 12th century and early 13th century, mentions of the Attieh family are made once again. In 1200 CE, a man named Ibrahim ibn Nu'man Attieh traveled to Izraa in the Hauran, where his family would remain for several centuries. In 1230 CE, he married his cousin Sarah, with whom he had three sons (Asaad, Mouawad, and Nassir), from whom all members of this Attieh family in the Levant descend today. Many still live in Izraa today and retain the surname Attieh.

== Migration to Lebanon ==
In the 15th century, a conflict broke out in the Hauran between its Christian and Muslim inhabitants, prompting the mass migration of Arab Christians in the region toward Lebanon. This migration served as the origin of many Lebanese Christian families, with the Attieh family being one of many examples. After their journey from the Hauran, they first settled in Aaitit, a village in the Beqaa Valley. From here, they dispersed across various towns within Lebanon and Syria, including but not limited to Ferzol, Ain Arab, Souq al-Gharb, Beino, Amioun, and Deir Atiyah.

Many descendants of this family exhibit a particular concentration within the Beqaa Valley, producing a variety of family names in the region. The Attieh family is predominantly Greek Orthodox, with a significant number adhering to the Melkite Greek Catholic rite. The latter rite is particularly common in Ferzol and Ain Arab, where many residents converted to Catholicism in the 18th century. From the Beqaa Valley, descendants of this family spread throughout Lebanon and Syria. The Syrian town of Deir Atiyah was one of many settled by the Attieh family, and lies northeast of the Beqaa Valley. Some also settled various towns in Mount Lebanon and the northern regions of the country, establishing communities in Amioun, Souq al-Gharb, Sidon, and Bkassine.

Members of the Attieh family were present throughout the history of Lebanon in the medieval and early modern periods. Ignatius III Atiyah, who descended from Attiehs who traveled further north in Syria, oversaw the initial schism and reconciliation of two factions within the Melkite Church of Antioch in the 17th century, being confirmed as the sole Patriarch of Antioch before the end of his term. Events such as these spurred further migration, causing the Attieh family to settle various small towns and larger cities. The Attiehs of the Levant retained knowledge of their distant origins, recalling their descent from Arabs of the Hauran in the Middle Ages.

== Modern period and diaspora ==
From these Levantine towns, thousands of descendants of this family migrated across the region, and later to countries around the world, settling in the United States, Canada, and Brazil. In these countries, many of them became successful in their own right, achieving prominence in politics and various professional industries. Today, descendants of the Attieh family are mostly concentrated among Greek Orthodox and Melkite Greek Catholic communities in Lebanon and Syria, with a noted diaspora in the Americas and Australia. Many of them no longer bear the Attieh name, instead carrying surnames that were derived from the epithets or patronyms of later descendants of the family.

== Notable persons ==
- George N. Atiyeh, Lebanese librarian
- Ignatius III Atiyah, Melkite Patriarch of Antioch
- Joseph Atiyeh, Syrian wrestler
- Joseph Attieh, Lebanese singer
- Michael Atiyah, Lebanese-British mathematician
- Rania Attieh, Lebanese-American filmmaker
- Sumayeh Attiyeh, Syrian lecturer and writer
- Victor Atiyeh, Lebanese-American politician and 32nd governor of Oregon
- Edward Atiyah, writer and 1st secretary of the Arab Office, London

== See also ==
- Atiyah
- Beqaa Valley
- Ferzol
- Ghassanids
- Hauran
