= Atea, Zaragoza =

Atea
- municipality
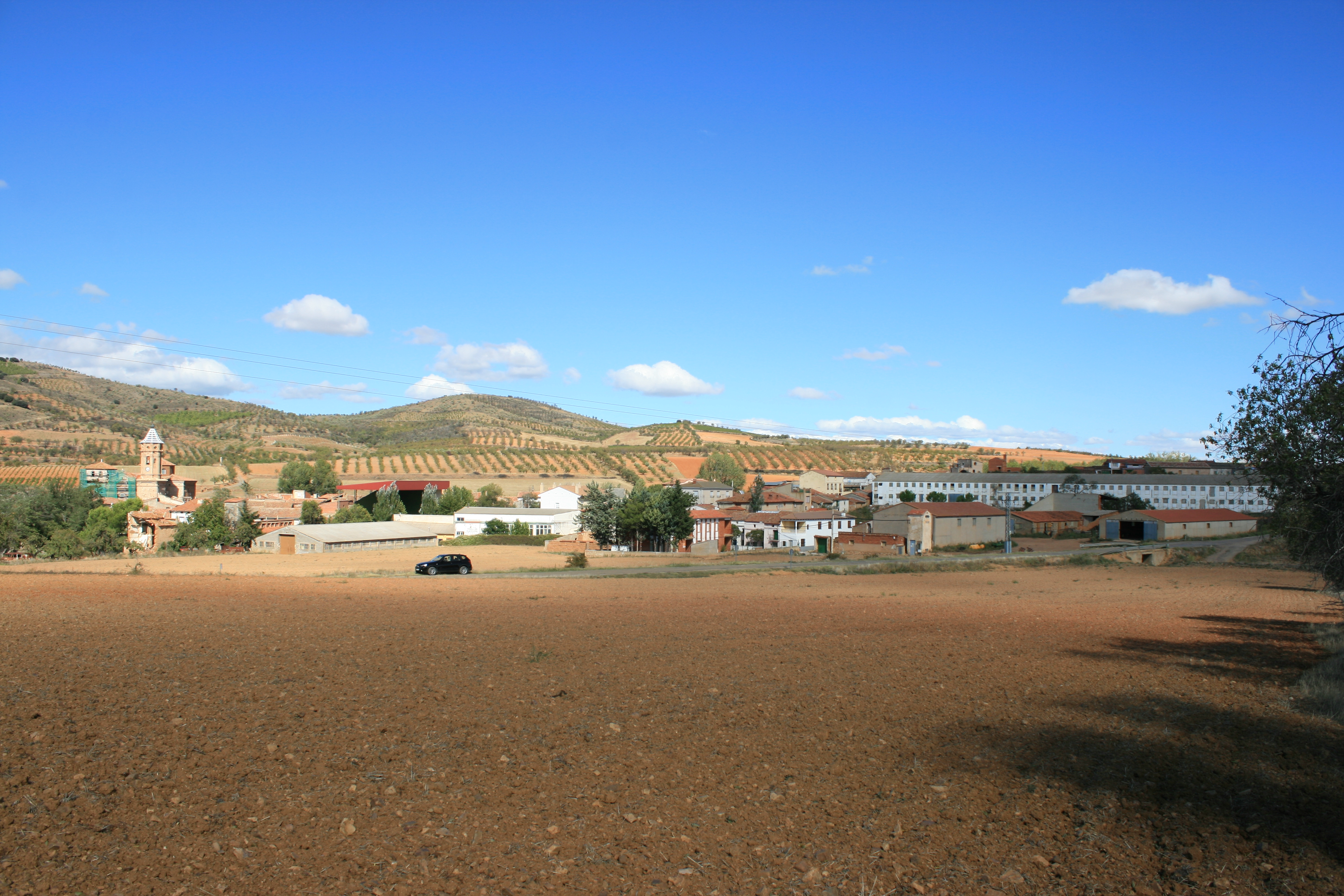

- Flag Coat of arms

- Location within Aragon Location within Spain Location within Europe
- Country: Spain
- Autonomous community: Aragon
- Province: Zaragoza
- Comarca: Campo de Daroca

Area
  - Total: 34.68 km^{2} (13.39 sq mi)
- Elevation: 842 m (2,762 ft)

Population (2025-01-01)
  - Total: 142
  - Density: 4.09/km^{2} (10.6/sq mi)
- Time zone: UTC+1 (CET)
  - Summer (DST): UTC+2 (CEST)

Atea is a municipality in the province of Zaragoza, Aragon, Spain. It is part of the comarca of Campo de Daroca.

The town is located near the Sierra de Santa Cruz.

== See also ==
- List of municipalities in Zaragoza
