= Attia Nasreddin =

Attia Nasreddin is a businessman who is the chief executive officer and chair of the Nasco Group in Nigeria.

== Personal life ==
Nasreddin was born in Asmara on 24 April 1950. He has a Bachelor's degree in political science from the American College of Switzerland.

== Business activities ==
=== Nasco Group ===
The Nasco Group was established in Jos in 1963 by Nasreddin's father, Ahmed Idris Nasreddin. The company grew to become a conglomerate with four major manufacturing units and other investments in the service sector. The company has a strong focus on agro-business and is involved in backward integration in this sector.

In 1981, Attia Nasreddin became the managing director of Nasco Estate Company Limited, Lagos, Nigeria. By 1983, he had become Vice President of Nasco International, Milan Italy. In 1990, he assumed the office of President of Nasco Group Nigeria Limited, until 1999, when he was elevated to Vice Chairman of Nasco Group International Milan Italy. Since 2004 Nasreddin had been chairman/CEO of Nasco Group Limited Jos.

=== Awards and recognition ===
- 1997: Nasreddin received the Rotary Foundation's Paul Harris Fellow award, in appreciation of his role in the furtherance of global peace.
- 1997: The Institute of Corporate Administrators of Nigeria awarded Nasreddin a Fellowship for distinguishing himself in the field of Administration.
- The Nigerian Institute of Public Relations (NIPR) awarded Nasreddin the Leadership Award in Corporate Governance.
- 2003: The Nigerian Social Insurance Trust Fund gave Nasreddin the Most Valuable Employer Award.
- He received the Bankers Company Award by the Financial Times of London, whilst the National Institute for Policy and Strategic Studies recognized him for his support to strategic studies in the institute.
- 2022: Conferment of the National Honours Award of the Order of the Federal Republic on Attia Nasreddin by President Muhammadu Buhari.
