= Chicago Lighthouse =

U.S. non-profit organization

The Chicago Lighthouse is a non-profit organization located in Chicago, Illinois.

The Lighthouse is one of the oldest social service agencies in Chicago. Among the many programs it offers are a school for children with multi-disabilities; job training and placement; a low vision clinic; and a manufacturing facility that boasts the nation's sole contract to supply clocks to the U.S. government. The Lighthouse is regarded as the most comprehensive agency of its kind in the Midwest and a model agency nationally.

During its existence, The Chicago Lighthouse has improved the quality of life for people who are blind or visually impaired and has provided opportunities toward increased independent living.

== History ==
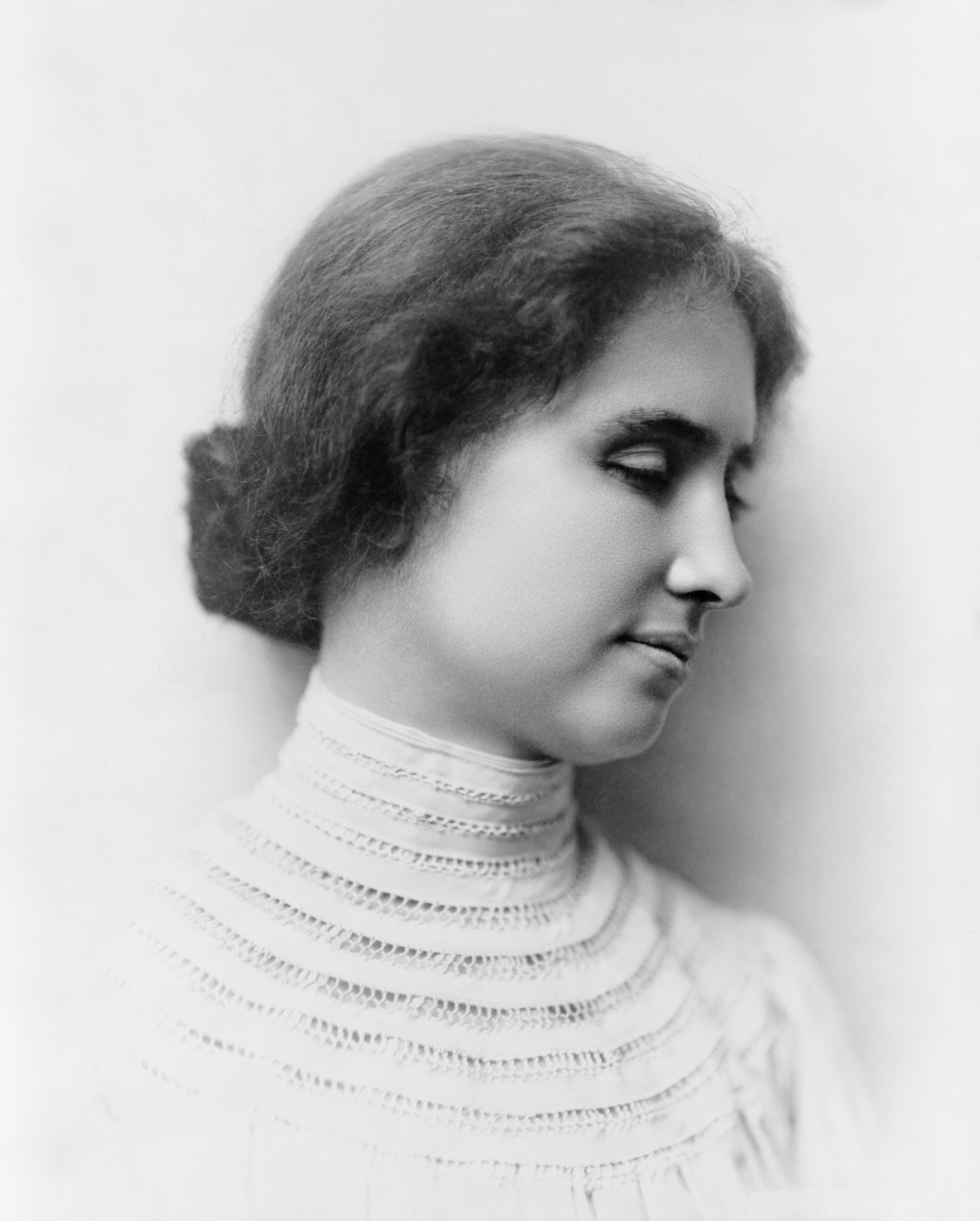
Helen Keller

The Chicago Lighthouse was founded by a group of blind and sighted women volunteers in 1906 and called the "Improvement Association for the Blind". Its founding purpose was to provide basic care and community services for blind and visually impaired individuals.

By 1918, The Chicago Lighthouse trained and placed 46 blind or visually impaired men and women in competitive work. Job opportunities included crafting coffin handles and edges, assembling various products such as electrical wires for Edison Appliance Company, and hand weaving baskets, which were later to be sold as gift items in the shops and holiday catalogs of Marshall Field's.

In 1931, The Chicago Lighthouse's original name, "Improvement Association for the Blind", was changed to "The Chicago Lighthouse for the Blind".

In 1955, The Chicago Lighthouse hosted a dedication ceremony of a new building at which Helen Keller was the keynote speaker. Helen Keller was a common visitor to the lighthouse's annual dinners during the 1940s and 1950s.

The Chicago Lighthouse Low Vision Clinic – the first of its kind in the Midwest and the second in the nation – was formally established in 1957, involving both the Illinois Optometric Association and the Chicago Ophthalmological Society, to provide low vision services for people whose vision cannot be improved with standard corrective lenses.

The agency officially changed its name from "The Chicago Lighthouse for the Blind" to "The Chicago Lighthouse for People Who Are Blind or Visually Impaired" in 1999. In 2015, the organization shortened its official name to simply The Chicago Lighthouse.

== Assistive Technologies ==
In 2020, the Chicago Lighthouse obtained an assistive device called the OrCam MyEye 2.0 which was provided to a number of employees. The MyEye 2.0 is voice-activated and allows visually impaired people to comprehend text and visual images by transforming them into sound.

== Chicago Lighthouse Industries and China ==
Chicago Lighthouse Industries is a manufacturing facility that employs people who are blind or visually impaired. It has grown from a workshop environment in the early years to a professional manufacturer in the last three decades.

The Chicago Lighthouse was awarded a contract with the Federal Government in 1977 to produce wall clocks. A year later, Chicago Lighthouse Industries was officially initiated. The wall clocks are sold to several departments of the Federal Government, including the Department of Defense, and to and through various commercial entities.

On February 2, 2005, The Chicago Lighthouse was featured on the front page of The Wall Street Journal. The article by Michael J. McCarthy covered how the Lighthouse Industries was coping with competition from foreign countries like China.

"The clock is ticking for The Chicago Lighthouse," writes McCarthy, "which faces heavy new competition from China. In the past four years, U.S. imports of wall clocks -- most of them from China -- have increased by 24%, totaling $121 million in 2003."

However, in 1938 President Roosevelt signed the Wagner-O'Day Act which directed the government to purchase products manufactured by blind Americans. In 1971, Senator Jacob Javits introduced legislation known as the Javits–Wagner–O'Day Act, extending the act to severely disabled individuals. For a long time, The Chicago Lighthouse was a dominant player in the wall clock business. Today, not every government buyer is aware of The Chicago Lighthouse's favored status as a manufacturer, because the government more than a decade ago decentralized buying and encouraged individual departments to seek bargains.

"But China isn't cleaning Chicago Lighthouse's clock just yet," adds McCarthy. "The company's sales have actually crept up a bit in recent years amid a push to make its clocks available to corporations and the general public."

The issue has since raised the attention of former United States President Barack Obama, who visited The Lighthouse in the summer of 2005. Congressman Danny Davis encouraged officials on the House Floor in Washington to purchase from the Lighthouse with the following remarks:

We are always looking for the most cost-efficient way of doing business. We also better look at the needs of our people and we better look at the needs of the people in our community to provide opportunities for blind people to work, to have dignity, to have pride, to have a sense of self-worth. We should not let anything erode that, we should not let anything take that away and so I would urge us, as we purchase, as we continue to purchase clocks, that we remember something the bible says: "Where there is no vision, the people perish." Some people can see but have no vision; sometimes our policies reflect the ability to see, but not in a visionary way. Please, America, let's not put the people at The Chicago Lighthouse for the Blind out of work. Let's keep them working and hopefully all the rest of us will be able to see.
