= Attius Labeo =

Attius Labeo (active 1st century AD) was a Roman writer during the reign of Nero. He is remembered for the derision that greeted his Latin translations of Homer's Iliad and Odyssey, which came to epitomise bad verse. He translated the original Greek into Latin hexameters. The satirist Persius poured scorn on Labeo. Later his name was used by English poets of the Elizabethan era to attack each other's verse.

== Work ==
His writings have not survived, but a single line of his translation has been preserved in scholia: "crudum manduces Priamum Priamique pisinnos", which was Labeo's translation of the words - ὠμòν ßεßρώΘοις Πρίαμον Πριάμοιó τε παîδας (Iliad, iv, 35). On the basis of this surviving line, it has been suggested that the translation was considered to be vulgar, since the words 'manduces' and 'pisinnos' would have "undoubtedly struck Romans as exotically 'low'". In English the line means, roughly, "Raw, you'd chew both Priam and Priam's kids."

== Persius ==
Persius, a contemporary of the translator, refers to Labeo in his Satires as the epitome of a bad poet, mentioning him in his discussion of his reasons for taking up his pen:

O curas hominum! o quantum est in rebus inane!
"Quis leget haec?" min tu istud ais? Nemo hercule. "Nemo?"
Vel duo, vel nemo. "Turpe et miserabile." Quare?
Ne mihi Polydamas et Troïades Labeonem
Praetulerint? Nugae!

RGM Nisbet translates these lines as: "The toils of men! The emptiness of life! 'Who's going to read that?' Are you talking to me? Nobody, of course. 'Nobody?' Well, two at the most. 'That's a poor show.' Why? Because Polydamas and the Trojan Women may prefer Labeo to me? Bosh." Polydamas was a Trojan leader in the Iliad characterised by his timidity. He and the women of Troy tried to stop Hector making a bold attack on the Greeks.

Persius also says that Labeo must have made the translation while "drunk with hellebore" (ebria ueratro).

== English satire ==
Following Persius' use of the name, Elizabethan English satirists used the name "Labeo" as a code for a bad poet. "Labeo" appears in Joseph Hall's Satires, in which he is accused of writing bad pastoral, erotic and heroic verse, evidently a reference to poetry of the time. The identity of Hall's "Labeo" is disputed. It has been suggested that Michael Drayton may be the target. Samuel Daniel has also been suggested. However, it has been argued that Hall's "Labeo" is a composite figure, standing for the vulgarity of modern poetry, as Hall saw it. In the view of Oscar James Campbell, "The English Labeo is best regarded as a type figure representing each and every one of the assiduous and tasteless Elizabethan translators."

Likewise, John Marston mentions "Labeo" in Pygmalion's Image, which includes the words, "So Labeo did complain his love was stone,/Obdurate, flinty, so relentless none." It may be that this use of the "Labeo" persona is an attack on Shakespeare, since the lines resemble a passage in Venus and Adonis.

John Milton in an early essay quotes Persius on Labeo, referring to academic rivalries,

So provocative of animosity, even in the home of learning, is the rivalry of those who pursue different studies or whose opinions differ concerning the studies they pursue in common. However, I care not if "Polydamas and the women of Troy prefer Labeo to me;--a trifle this".
