= Atea Cave =

Cave in Papua New Guinea

The Atea Cave is a very large cave at the base of a 300 m deep doline in the highlands of Papua New Guinea. It is the second longest cave on the island.

Exploration of the cave started in 1973 when the Niugini Speleological Research Expedition made a brief visit to the cave. A subsequent Australian expedition, Muller 76, extended the cave to 4.6 km of passage.

The cave was the main objective of the Atea 1978 expedition, a highly organised Australian-led expedition with 50 members from five countries, and was then surveyed at over 30 km in length and 143 m in depth, at that time classified as the longest cave in the Southern Hemisphere. The cave has a variety of interesting features, including several very large breakdown chambers, a lengthy and impressive main riverway, and an exceptionally large number of secondary systems and smaller passages.

Since 1978, there have been a small number of subsequent visits, extending the depth of the cave to 350 m and the length to 34.5 km.

== Sources ==
- Caves and Karst of the Muller Range - report of the 1978 Speleological Expedition to the Atea Kananda, Southern Highlands, Papua New Guinea, Ed Julia James and H Jane Dyson, 1980
- Beneath the Cloud Forests, Howard Beck, 2003
