= Attia Shaalan =

Egyptian bodybuilder

Attia Shalan is an Egyptian bodybuilder who won a gold medal at the 2011 Pan Arab Games, and first place in the over 100 kg category and overall 'Champion of Champions' at the 2014 World Amateur Bodybuilding Championships.
