= Attea =

Ancient town

Coordinates: 39°12′51″N 26°46′00″E

Attea (Ancient Greek: Ἄττεα) was a coastal town of ancient Mysia or of Aeolis. If we follow the order of Strabo's enumeration, it lay between Heracleia and Atarneus. It has been conjectured that it is the same place which is named Attalia in the Peutinger Table. Pliny the Elder mentions an Attalia in Mysia, but he places it in the interior; and he also mentions the Attalenses as belonging to the conventus of Pergamum. It seems, then, there is some confusion in the authorities about this Attalia; and the Lydian Attalia of Stephanus of Byzantium and this Attalia of Pliny may be the same place. Also, attempts to equate the town with Attaea, a later bishopric near Ephesus, have likewise proved unsatisfactory.

Its site is located near Maltepe, Ayazment, Asiatic Turkey.
