= Brazilian Association of Atheists and Agnostics =

Organization

Associação Brasileira de Ateus e Agnósticos
- Abbreviation: ATEA
- Formation: August 2008
- Type: Nonprofit organization
- Headquarters: São Paulo, Brazil
- Official language: Portuguese
- Key people: Daniel Sottomaior, Alfredo Spínola and Mauricio Palazzuoli
- Website: www.atea.org.br

The Brazilian Association of Atheists and Agnostics (Portuguese: Associação Brasileira de Ateus e Agnósticos), or ATEA, is a Brazilian atheist activist nonprofit organization founded in August 2008. The organization advocates the separation of church and state and promotes atheism and agnosticism. Although Brazil is legally defined by its Constitution as a secular state, the organization has voiced its concern that this is not observed in practice.

Its slogans have been: "Religião não define caráter" ("Religion does not define character"), "A fé não dá respostas, só evita perguntas." ("Faith does not give answers. It only prevents questions"), "Se Deus existe, tudo é permitido" ("If God exists, everything is permitted") and "Somos todos ateus para os deuses dos outros" ("We are all atheists to others' gods").

As of May 2015, it has more than 15,000 associated members.
