= Atia gens =

Ancient Roman family

The gens Atia, sometimes written Attia, was a minor plebeian family at Ancient Rome. The first of this gens to achieve prominence was Lucius Atius, a military tribune in 178 BC. Several of the Atii served in the Civil War between Caesar and Pompeius. The gens Attia of imperial times may be descended from this family, although its members lived nearly a century after the more notable Atii, and are not known to have been related.

== Origin ==
None of the Atii are mentioned in history prior to the second century BC, and none of them ever held the consulship, but owing to its connection with Augustus, Vergil pretended this gens to be descended from Atys, a friend of Ascanius, the son of Aeneas, or one of the kings of Alba Longa supposedly descended from Ascanius.

== Praenomina ==
The Atii mentioned in history bore the most common praenomina, including Lucius, Gaius, Marcus, Publius, and Quintus.

== Branches and cognomina ==
The only cognomina found among the more notable Atii are Balbus, Celsus, Rufus, and Varus, of which only Balbus appears on coins. The Atii Balbi were from the city of Aricia. The Venetian scholar Paulus Manutius conjectured that the family of the Labieni belonged to the Atia gens, which opinion was followed by some modern writers. However, Spanheim pointed out that there was no authority for this. Labienus is not found as the cognomen of any person named Atius, nor as a surname of any other gens, but is instead the nomen of a separate gens.

== Members ==
This list includes abbreviated praenomina. For an explanation of this practice, see filiation.

- Lucius Atius, the senior military tribune serving in the second legion during the war with the Istri, in 178 BC.
- Gaius Attius Celsus, praetor around 65 BC, encouraged Cicero to take up the defense of Gaius Manilius, who had been accused of various misdeeds while tribune of the plebs the preceding year.
- Gaius Atius, (Note: Or Gaius Attius Paelignus.) of Paelignian birth, was a partisan of Gnaeus Pompeius, and had possession of Sulmo in the territory of the Paeligni in 49 BC. He surrendered to Caesar when the townsfolk opened the gates to Marcus Antonius, and was dismissed without injury.
- Atius Rufus, an officer serving under Pompeius in Greece during the Civil War, suggested that the defeat of Lucius Afranius in Spain was due to the latter's disloyalty.
- Publius Attius P. f., a senator by 39 BC, may have held an aedileship.

=== Atii Balbi ===
- Marcus Atius Balbus, the father of Marcus Atius Balbus, praetor in 62 BC, and great-grandfather of Augustus.
- Publius Attius P. f. (Balbus), a military tribune in 89 BC.
- Marcus Atius M. f. Balbus, praetor about 60 BC, was the maternal grandfather of Augustus. In 59 BC, he and Gnaeus Pompeius were among the twenty commissioners appointed to allocate land in Campania. He may also have been governor of Sardinia.
- Atia M. f. M. n., possibly an elder aunt of Augustus.
- Atia M. f. M. n., the second wife of Gaius Octavius, and mother of Augustus. After her husband's death, she married Lucius Marcius Philippus, who became consul in 56 BC. She died during her son's first consulship, in 43 BC, and was given a public funeral.
- Marcus Attius Balbus, praetor by 44 BC.
- Atia M. f. M. n., an aunt of Augustus, married Augustus' step-brother, Lucius Marcius Philippus, consul in 38 BC.
- Marcus Atius (M. f. M. n.) Balbus, possibly the uncle of Augustus, founded the municipium of Uselis in Sardinia about 38 BC, perhaps as governor of the province.
- Atia M. f. M. n., possibly the cousin of Augustus, was the mother of the consuls Gaius Junius Silanus and Marcus Junius Silanus.

=== Atii Vari ===
- Publius Attius Varus, one of Pompeius' loyal supporters during the Civil War, had been praetor and subsequently governor of Africa. He met with considerable success in the African campaign, and later fell at the Battle of Munda.
- Quintus Atius Varus, a cavalry commander who served under the legate Gaius Fabius during the Gallic Wars. He is probably the same Quintus Varus who served under Caesar during the Civil War. He may be identical with a number of other persons referred to as "Varus" during this period.

== See also ==
- Attia gens
- List of Roman gentes

== Bibliography ==
- Marcus Tullius Cicero, Epistulae ad Atticum; Philippicae; Pro Ligario.
- Gaius Julius Caesar, Commentarii de Bello Gallico (Commentaries on the Gallic War); Commentarii de Bello Civili (Commentaries on the Civil War).
- Aulus Hirtius (attributed), De Bello Africo (On the African War).
- Publius Vergilius Maro (Vergil), Aeneid.
- Titus Livius (Livy), History of Rome.
- Marcus Velleius Paterculus, Roman History.
- Marcus Annaeus Lucanus (Lucan), Pharsalia.
- Lucius Cassius Dio, Roman History.
- Publius Cornelius Tacitus, Dialogus de Oratoribus (Dialogue on Oratory).
- Lucius Mestrius Plutarchus (Plutarch), Lives of the Noble Greeks and Romans (Parallel Lives).
- Gaius Suetonius Tranquillus, De Vita Caesarum (Lives of the Caesars, or The Twelve Caesars).
- Appianus Alexandrinus (Appian), Bellum Civile (The Civil War).
- Ezekiel, Freiherr von Spanheim, Disputationes de Usu et Praestantia Numismatum Antiquorum (Arguments concerning the Knowledge and Superiority of Ancient Coins), Rome, (1664).
- Dictionary of Greek and Roman Biography and Mythology, William Smith, ed., Little, Brown and Company, Boston (1849).
- T. Robert S. Broughton, The Magistrates of the Roman Republic, American Philological Association (1952–1986).
- Lee Fratanuono, Madness Unchained: A Reading of Virgil's Aeneid, Lexington Books (2007), ISBN 978-0-7391-2242-6
