= Augusti Pagus (Roman Phoenicia) =

Roman settlement in Roman Phoenicia

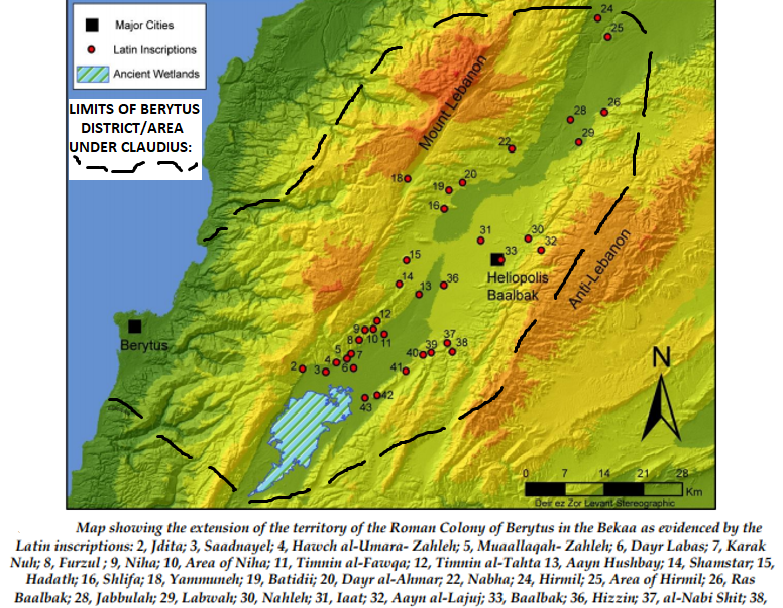
Map showing the "Berytus district" under emperor Claudius, with the possible area of Augusti Pagus numbered 2-12

Augusti Pagus was a Roman settlement in Roman Phoenicia. It was created in the 110s AD and lasted nearly seven centuries until the Arab invasion of the Levant. The settlement was named in honor of Roman Emperor Augustus, who ordered the development of this pagus in the central-northern hills of the Beqaa Valley.

== History ==
In the 1st century AD, after the Roman conquest of Phoenicia, the Roman Emperor Augustus settled some veterans of his legions in what is now central Lebanon.

Most of the Roman veterans settled in Berytus (The veterans of two Roman legions were established in the city of Berytus by emperor Augustus: the fifth Macedonian and the third Gallic), but a few moved to colonize the fertile Beqaa valley.

These few hundreds created the so-called "Augustus pagus" or "Augusti pagus".

The pagus was made of a group of farm-houses (owned by retired legionaries) in a relatively close and interconnected area where latin was spoken for some centuries.

Of special interest is the material from Niha, in the Beqa valley, where a series of inscriptions in Latin records the existence of a sanctuary of the Syrian Goddess of Niha’, Hadaranes, or Atargatis. One of those mentions the "Pagus Augustus", presumably an association of Latin-speaking Roman citizens which will have been settled there at the time of the foundation of the Roman colony. At this sanctuary some evidence of social integration has been detected. The sanctuary preserved its indigenous character, and the gods did not receive Graeco-Roman names. In contrast to the sanctuary at Heliopolis itself, the priests and prophetesses were peregrini, but the inscriptions also mention at least six Roman citizens and their relatives. A sanctuary nearby is identified by a dedication in Latin to the god Mifsenus. Benjamin Isaac

From the 1st century BC the Beqaa valley served as a source of grain for the Roman provinces of the Levant and Rome; even today the valley makes up to 40 percent of Lebanon's arable land. Roman colonists created a "country district" within "Augusti Pagus", where are located the famous Roman Niha temples with Latin inscriptions. This district reached the Kadisha valley in north Lebanon: vestiges of Roman presence have been found in the "Asi Hauqqa cave" near Hawqa and the UNESCO World Heritage Site Cedars of God.

This pagus lasted some centuries until the Arab conquest of the region in the seventh century. Some villages still exist in the area: the most important are Niha and Hosn Niha, where remnants of four Roman temples still exist.

== Gallery ==
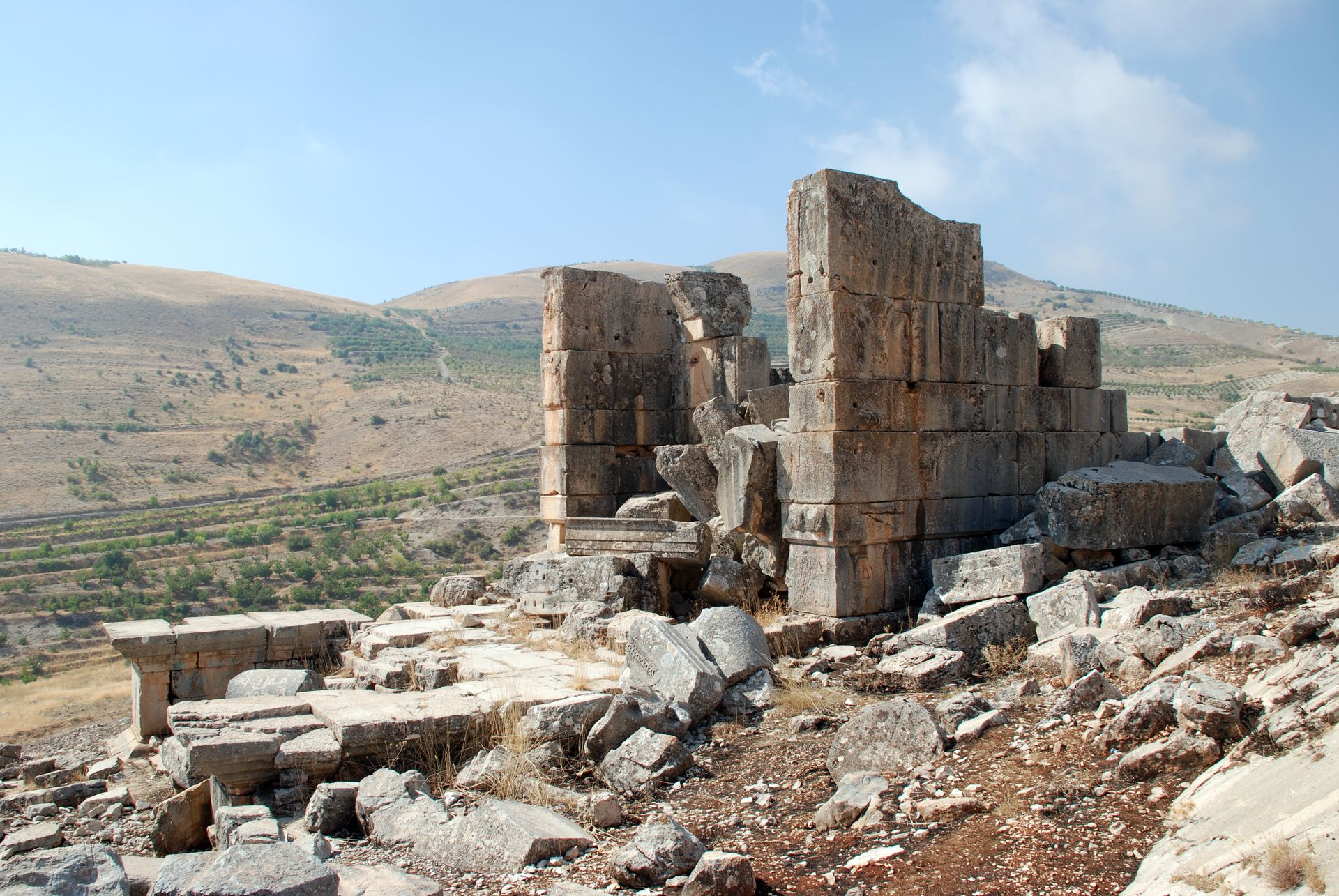
Roman temple of Hosn Niha, Lebanon

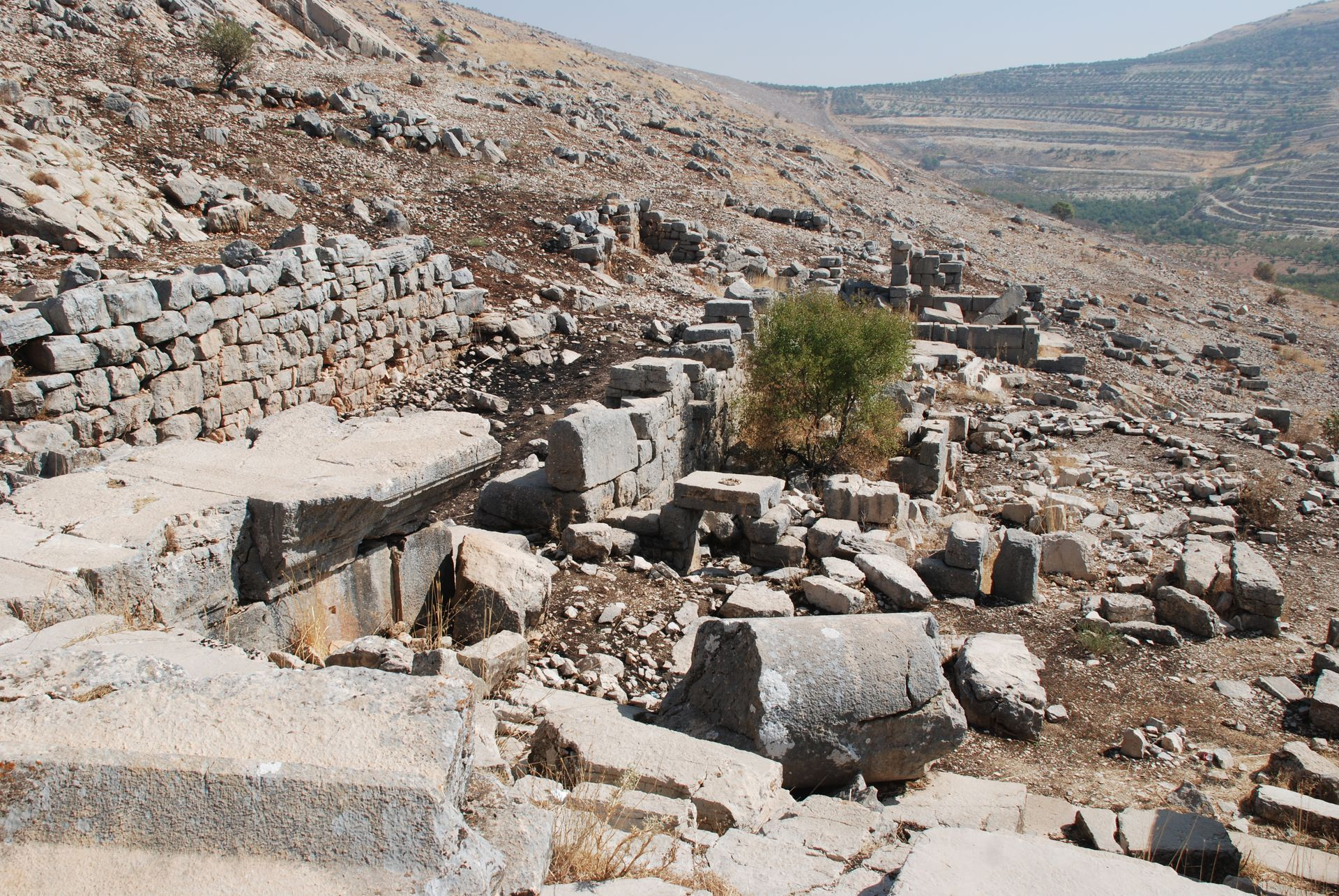
Roman temple of Hosn Niha, Lebanon

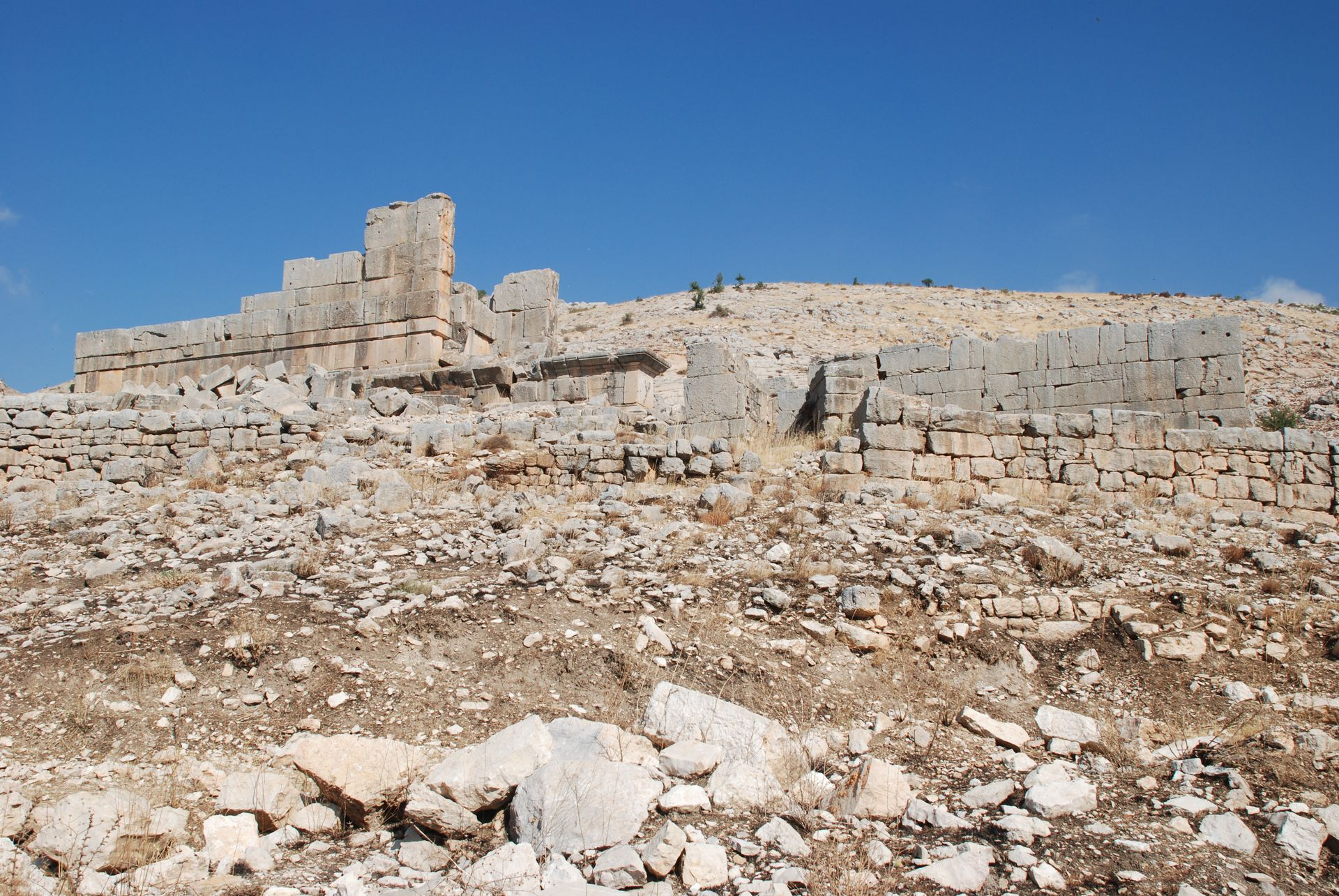
Roman temple of Hosn Niha, Lebanon

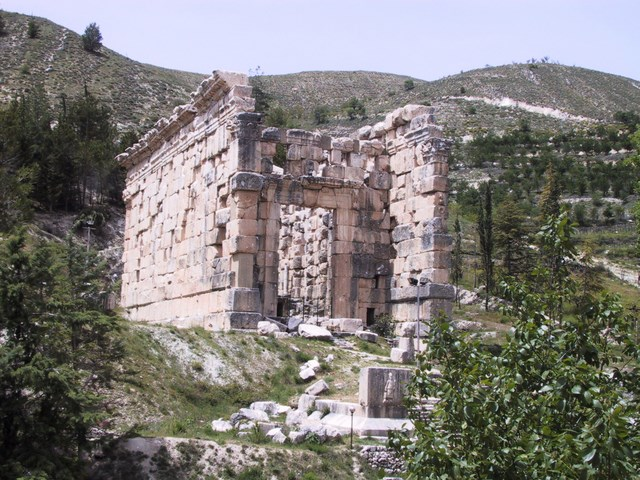
Roman temple at Niha, Lebanon

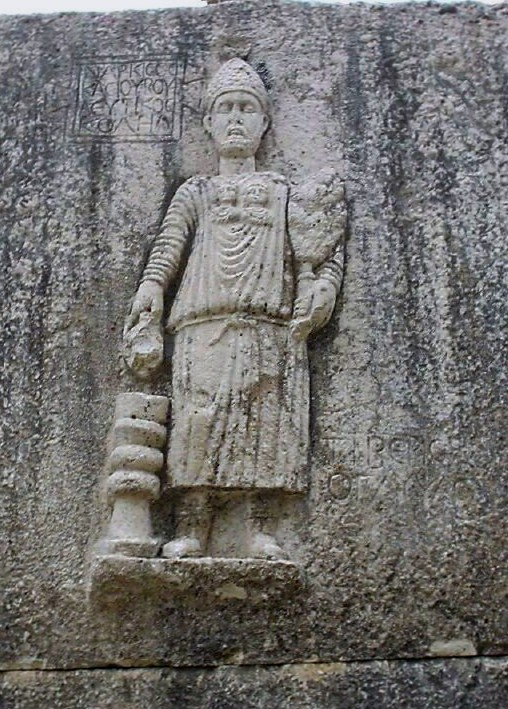
Statue at the Roman temple at Niha, Lebanon

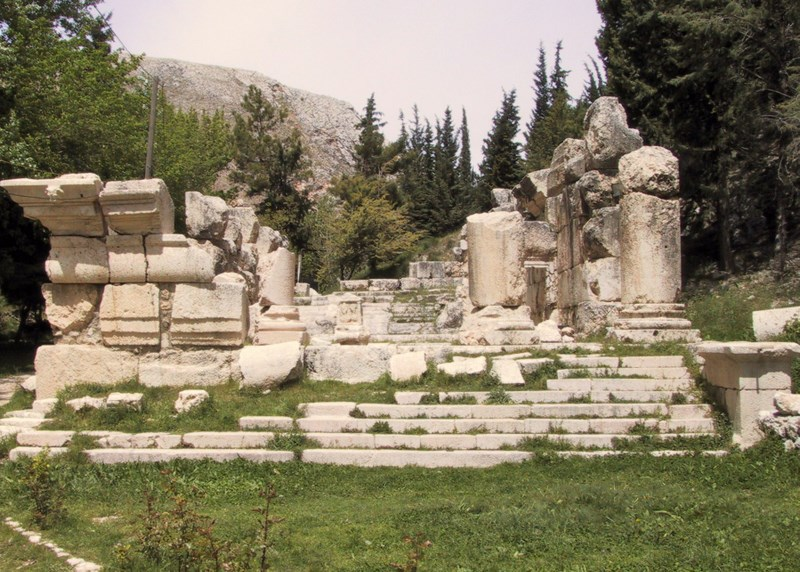
Small lower temple at Niha, Lebanon

== Bibliography ==
- Mann, J.C. The settlement of veterans in the Roman Empire London University. London, 1956
- Millar, Fergus (1993). The Roman Near East, 31 B.C.-A.D. 337. Cambridge, Mass.: Harvard University Press. ISBN 9780674778863.

== See also ==
- Roman Phoenicia
- Berytus
- Hosn Niha
