= Hosn Niha =

Archaeological site in Lebanon

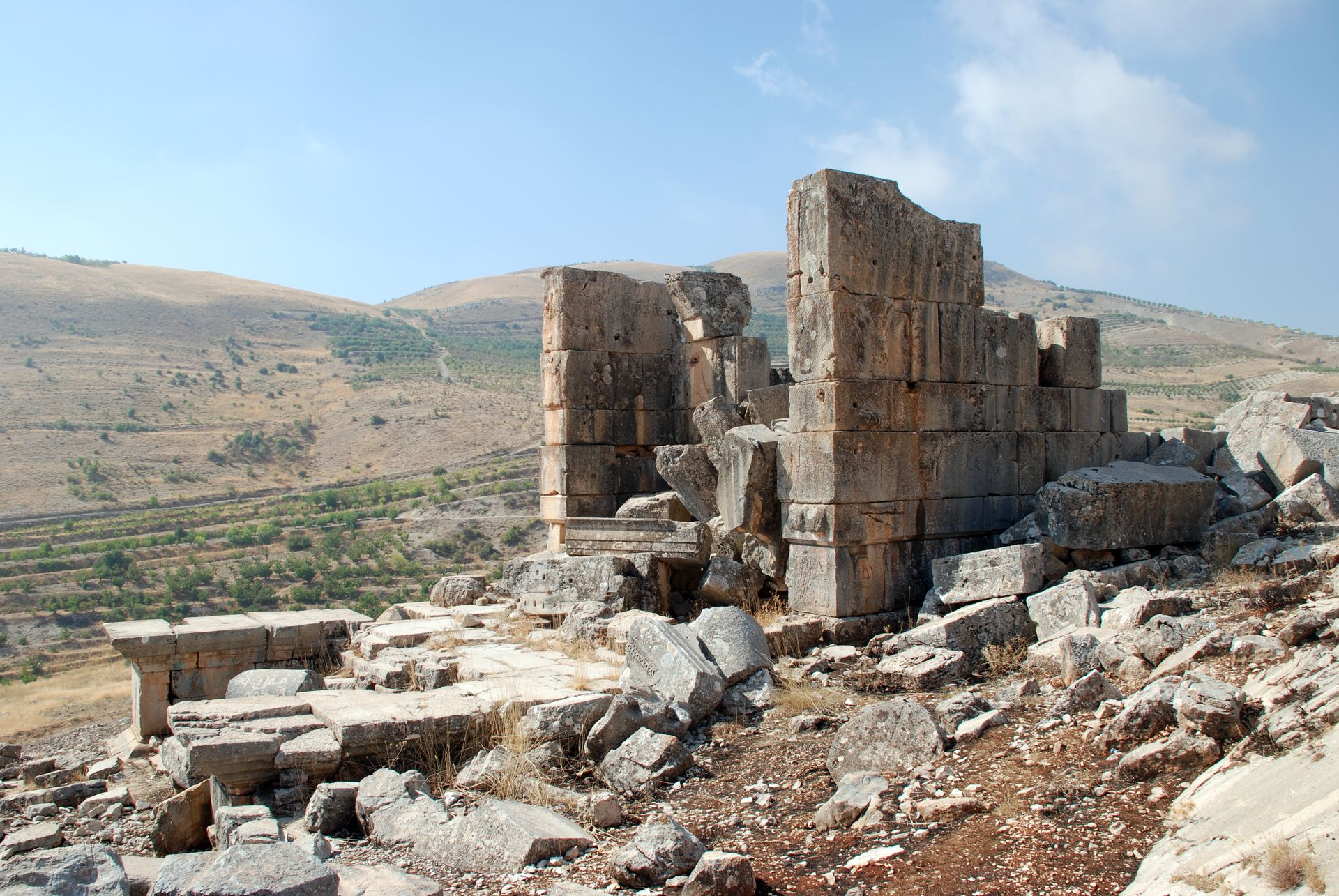
- Roman temple at Hosn Niha

- Location within Lebanon
- 33°54′27″N 35°56′55″E
- Cultures: Roman
- Location: south of Dahr El Ahmar
- Region: Bekaa Valley

Site notes
- Condition: Ruins
- Public access: Yes

Hosn Niha is an archaeological site in Lebanon composed of some temples and buildings in the outskirts of the village of Niha, that hold significant archaeological value.

== History ==
Hosh Niha was created between the first and third century AD, during the first centuries of the Roman empire's existence.

Anthropologists (like Yasmine) have predicted that the temples found at this site were previously used by a cult during the Greco-Roman period, though only limited work has been done on the site. The Roman settlement was eventually completely abandoned after the Arab conquest of the region. Much of the area and its buildings were destroyed during the Lebanese Civil War. The site stretches across land near the Bekaa Valley for a total of 550 meters at an altitude of 1350 meters. The site is noteworthy for the numerous tombs scattered around the area. Anthropologists have discovered that there were different types of tombs, which they assumed were assigned to people based on their ranking within the culture. Due to the recent growing interest in the site, more studies have been conducted.

During the 2024 Israeli invasion of Lebanon, UNESCO gave enhanced protection to 34 cultural sites in Lebanon including the temple at Hosn Niha to safeguard it from damage.

== Discovery ==
The earliest written mentions of the site come from European travelers in the nineteenth century. Recently, Jean Yasmine conducted detailed studies of the sanctuary and its architecture. Yasmine's work focused on mapping the sanctuary's layout. He was able to identify residences found within the village. He used different methods of research, such as surveying at landscape and built-up archaeology levels. His findings included the discovery of different tombs placed across the site and the important building nicknamed "La Grande Residence." This building contained many valuable pottery artifacts that helped archaeologists develop further research and hypotheses about the culture's values and beliefs.

== Geography ==
The Hosn Niha site was discovered near the Beqaa Valley and lies at the base of a steep slope. It is surrounded by large agricultural fields that are still being used today. Archaeologists discovered a sanctuary with two temples inside, with one being larger than the other. This sanctuary also contains a church and several cult rooms. A smaller sanctuary and two big quarries were also found further down nearing the village of Niha. An ancient trade route was discovered along the valley, running from the east towards Niha. Another archaeological site was found nearby.

=== Location ===
Because of the site's location and steep slope, the village is sheltered while still receiving a large amount of sunlight. A river that flows through the village had once provided the inhabitants with a sufficient water source. Anthropologists also discovered a spring not too far from the sanctuary.

The site has some drawbacks. Since it is located at such a high altitude, the winters can be very harsh. Winters reach extremely low temperatures and produce large snowfalls. The snow may have had a particularly large impact on the village's survival. Newson & Young claim that the heavy snow could block trade routes coming from and going to the sanctuary complex.

== Findings ==
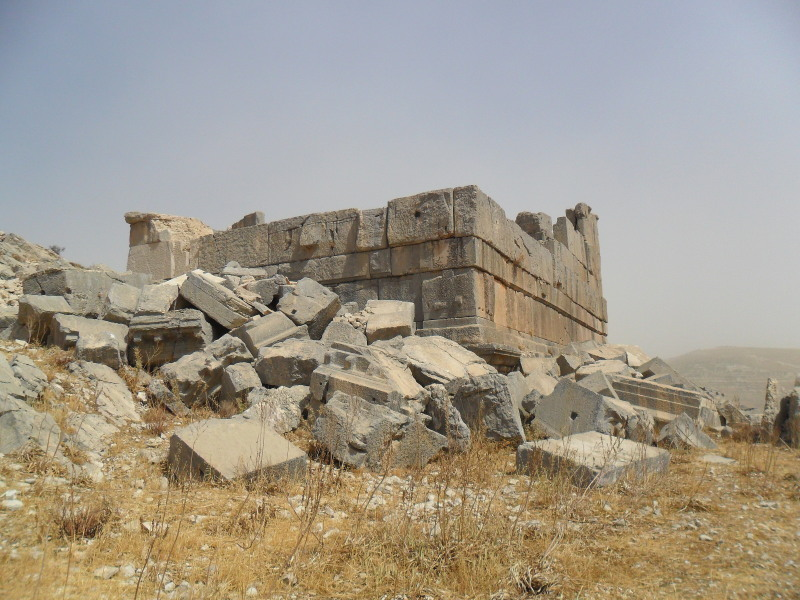
Hosn Niha's Medieval fortress remains

The village of Niha is home to four Roman temples that were constructed between the 1st and 3rd century AD (when the area was called Pagus Augustus). The lower two temples are located on the edge of the village, and the other two temples are about 2 km above the village in what is known as "Hosn Niha".

Located at an elevation of 1,400 m (4,600 ft) with difficult road access, these two temples of Hosn Niha have not been restored.

Architectural evidence at the site indicates that it was transformed into a small fort during the medieval period (hence the name of Hosn, that means fort in Arab language).

- Upper Great Temple. Built on a podium facing toward the east, the "Upper Great Temple" of Hosn Niha is composed of a portico with four columns, leading to a cella, and then to an elevated adytum. Today, the temple site is reasonably well preserved – most of its walls are intact, but its columns are no longer standing. The altar in front of the temple was destroyed by a Byzantine Basilica that was built over it. The Basilica has three naves and a semi-circular apse to its east end. The lower portions of the Basilica walls remain visible today.
- Lower Small Temple. The second "Lower Small Temple" opens to the south and was accessed through a stairway that is almost completely destroyed today. The stairway leads to a portico with two columns, and then to a small cella with a small niche at its end, which used to hold the statue of the god or goddess.

Many ancient findings are reported in the area, from pottery to tombs & sanctuaries.

=== Pottery ===
Disturbances created by outside forces brought sherds of pottery to the surface. These pieces of pottery were an incredible find because they gave archaeologists better insight about the people who once inhabited the area. After studying the fragments, Yasmine was able to determine that they were created in the first century AD and held extreme value to the culture, until the site was abandoned in the seventh century AD. These pottery sherds helped archaeologists -according to Yasmine- strengthen their assumptions about their existence during the Greco-Roman era.

=== Tombs ===
Before becoming an active archaeological site, the tombs had been targeted by looters for items of value that were buried with their owners. In addition to a nearby cemetery, excavators found a variety of tombs, including communal tombs, individual cast tombs, and stone sarcophagi. Rock-cut tombs were the more common type found at the site. Many of these tombs had entryways built into them. These entryways were usually created for people to place their offerings to the dead.

Cist tombs usually include multiple tombs arranged closely together. This layout led excavators to believe that these people were buried near each other because they were within the same family.

=== Sanctuaries ===
The double sanctuary was also an important structure on the site. This sanctuary consisted of several dormitory rooms and rooms that were specifically meant for sacrifices and rituals. Many of the altars found within these rooms have symbols of bulls' heads and garlands, which supports the hypothesis that this culture practiced sacrificial rituals. Larger rooms with larger altars are speculated to be a "male god's" room. The smaller attached room was usually assigned to the god's companion or partner, according to Newson.

== See also ==
- Beirut Hippodrome
- Roman temple of Bziza
- Temple of Bacchus

== See also ==
- Roman Phoenicia
- Temples of the Beqaa Valley
- Pagus Augustus
