= Hadaranes =

Local storm deity of Roman Lebanon

- storm and weather
- Major cult centre: Niha, Lebanon
- Gender: Male
- Region: Niha, Zahle in the Beqaa Valley, Lebanon
- Consort: Atargatis

Equivalents
- Canaanite: Hadad

Hadaranes (also recorded as Hadaranus, or Hadranes) was a local Syro-Phoenician deity worshipped in the Beqaa Valley of present-day Lebanon during the Roman period. He was identified as a local manifestation of the Semitic storm god Hadad and was worshipped at the sanctuary site of Niha alongside the goddess Atargatis.

== Cult and sanctuary ==
Scholars identify Hadaranes as a local manifestation of the West Semitic storm and weather god Hadad. The Belgian archaeologist and historian Franz Cumont, who provided the scholarly treatment of the god in Pauly encyclopedias, argued that Hadaranes was a local form of Heliopolitan Jupiter of Baalbek. In 2020, Rieger proposed that Hadaranes was a local god with his a distinct character, separate from the Heliopolitan god.

The primary center of worship for Hadaranes was located at the site of Niha (ancient Nihata, not to be confused with temples of Hosn Niha), situated in the central Beqaa Valley near Zahlé. The archaeological precinct features two lower Roman-era temples built between the first and third centuries AD. The Small Temple was built in the late first century AD. It is of the Ionic order and was believed to be dedicated to Hadaranes, or jointly to Atargatis and Hadaranes. The Great Temple was constructed during the second and third centuries AD. In their 1938 work, the German architectural historian Daniel Krencker and the historian Willy Zschietzschmann attributed its construction to the early second century AD, while later estimates range from around 200 AD (Ernest Will) to the mid-3rd century AD (Klaus S. Freyberger). Epigraphic evidence may indicate that a triad may have been venerated in Niha, consisting of Hadaranes, Atargatis, and a minor male deity considered their son.

== Epigraphy ==
The deity's name appears in the epigraphic record under several variant spellings, including Deus Hadaranus, and Hadranes. Hadaranes is attested at two locations in the region: Niha and Deir el-Ahmar, a town approximately 15 km north-west of Baalbek. The principal inscriptions from Niha are collected in the Inscriptions Grecques et Latines de la Syrie (IGLSyr 6, 2928), while a Latin cippus from the temple at Deir el-Ahmar also records his name (IGLSyr 6, 2908). The Latin votive inscription (IGLSyr 6, 2928) is dedicated by a priestess named Hochmaea. The inscription records that Hochmaea was a consecrated virgin (virgo dei Hadaranis) who, by order of the god, abstained from eating bread for twenty years:

Hocmaea, virgo dei Hadaranis, quia annis XX panem non edidit iussu ipsius dei, votum libens animo solvit.
("Hochmaea, virgin of the god Hadaranes, because by order of the god himself she did not eat bread for 20 years, willingly and deservedly fulfilled her vow").

The inscription and associated stone altars dedicated to Hadaranes are preserved in the collections of the National Museum of Beirut and the Istanbul Archaeology Museums.

== Representation and attributes ==
A relief on the soffit of the Great Temple's entrance architrave depicts an eagle gripping a crown in its beak, flanked by figures of Eros and Victory. This has not been interpreted in a mythological context, rather as a grouping of attributes, where the eagle and crown convey supreme, solar power and the Eros pointing to an identification of Dea Syria Nihathena (Atagartis). On another relief, now in the Istanbul Archaeology Museums, the god is shown in the iconographic style of Jupiter Optimus Maximus Heliopolitanus, accompanied by this consort (named in a bilingual inscription as both Dea Syria Nihathena and Atagartis). Freyberger interpreted a bronze votive hand from Niha as further evidence for a local divine triad. It depicts a young, Mercury-like figure between two rams (attributes of Mercury).

== Gallery ==
Great Temple in Niha

Inside the Great Temple in Niha

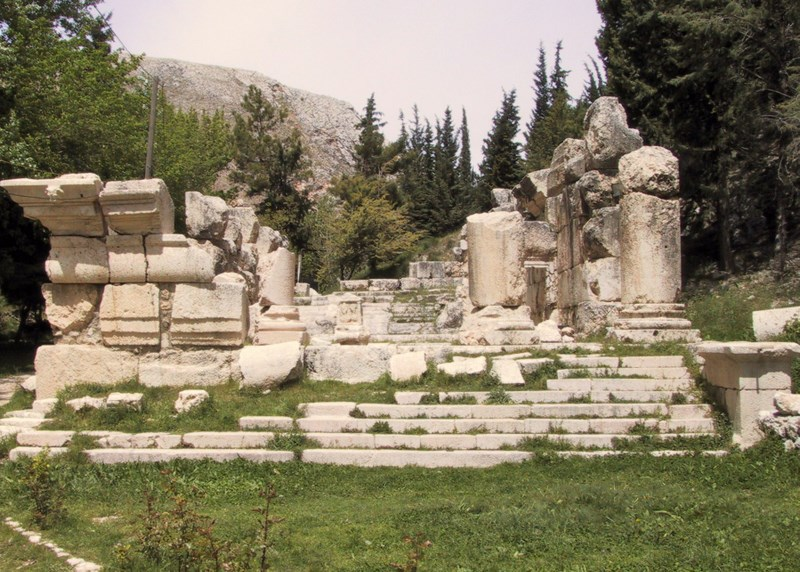
Niha Small Temple

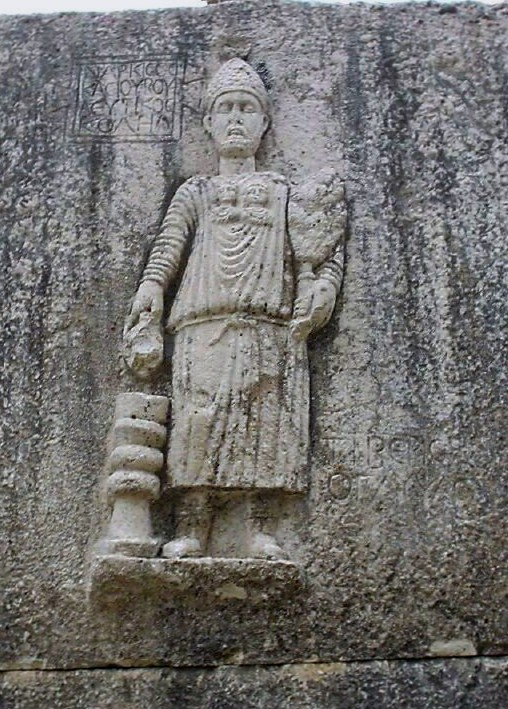
Statue of the priest Narkisos at the entrance of the Great Temple

Ex-voto in the shape of a hand in the name of Meniskos with a sheathed statuette of Mercury framed by two rams. Gilded bronze. Niha. Second to third century AD. Now in the Louvre museum.

== See also ==
- Hadad – Semitic storm god
- Jupiter Optimus Maximus Heliopolitanus – Syncretic deity from the ancient city of Heliopolis
- Temples of the Beqaa Valley – Shrines and Roman temples in the Beqaa Valley in Lebanon
