= Phoenicia under Roman rule =

Period in the history of Lebanon from 64 BCE to the 7th century

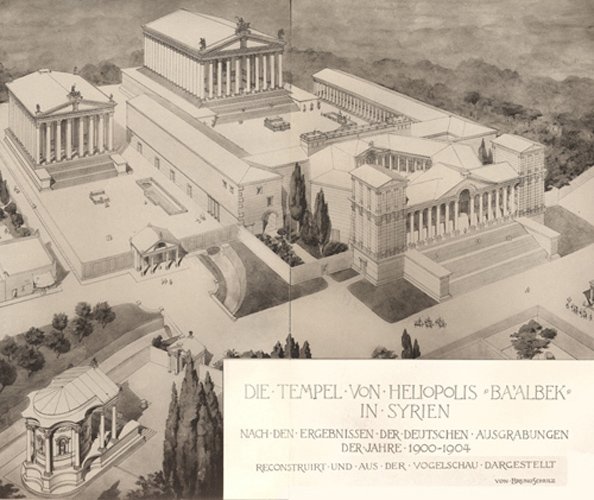
The temple complex of Roman Heliopolis (now Baalbek)

Phoenicia under Roman rule describes the Phoenician city states (in the area of modern Lebanon, coastal Syria, the northern part of Galilee, Acre and the Northern Coastal Plain) ruled by Rome from 64 BCE to the Muslim conquests of the 7th century. The area around Berytus (and to a lesser degree around Heliopolis) was the only Latin speaking and Romanized part of Aramaic-speaking Phoenicia.

The history of the Roman Republic began between the 6th century BCE/5th century BCE. The Roman Phoenicia lasted from the 1st century to the 4th century BCE. In the 4th century BCE the Romans expanded their empire into the Italian peninsula and proceeded to expand into foreign areas. The Roman Republic invaded Carthage, where the Punic Wars were fought.

This was one of the most prosperous periods in the history of the area that is now Lebanon. Phoenicia became one of the intellectual and economic hubs of the eastern half of the empire and a destination for merchants and intellectuals. The Romans built the temples of Baalbek, the temples at Mount Hermon, the temples of Niha and various other structures now in ruins that include smaller temples, hippodromes, baths and the Law school of Berytus.

== History ==
The last century of Seleucid rule in Lebanon was marked by disorder and dynastic struggles. These ended in 63 BCE, when the Roman General Gnaeus Pompeius Magnus, more commonly known as Pompey the Great, lead his military and defeated the Seleucid Empire. This defeat captured Seleucid Syria and Phoenicia (Lebanon), adding to the Roman State.

Economic and intellectual activities flourished in Lebanon during the Pax Romana. The inhabitants of the principal Phoenician cities of Byblos, Sidon, and Tyre were granted Roman citizenship. These cities were centers of the pottery, glass, and purple dye industries; their harbors also served as warehouses for products imported from Syria, Persia, and India. They exported cedar, perfume, jewelry, wine, and fruit to Rome. This prosperity meant Phoenicia became a notable destination for intellectuals, tradesmen and merchants; even farmers, from all over the empire and especially the east.

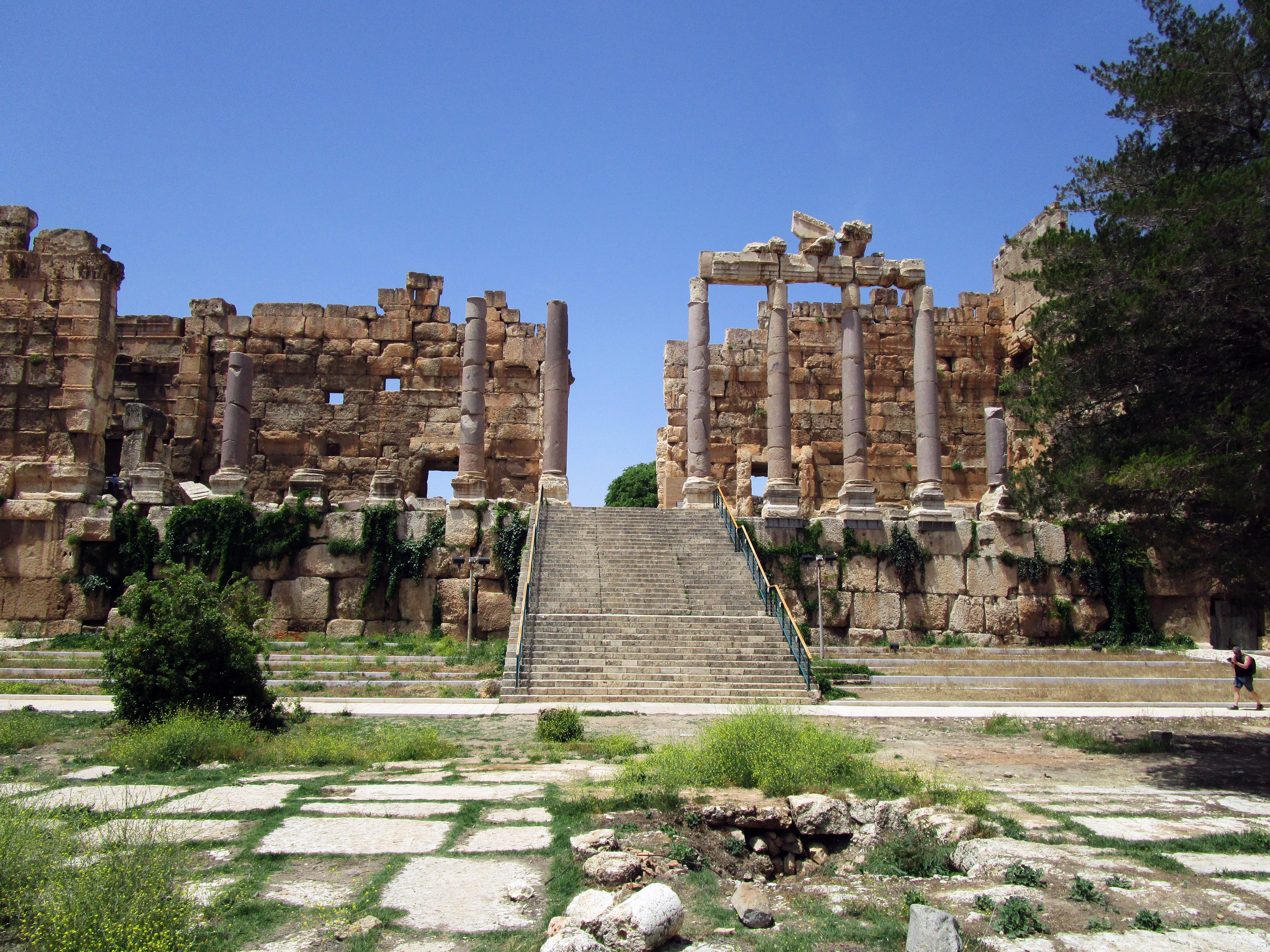
Propylaea of Baalbek temples complex

Economic prosperity led to a revival in construction and urban development; temples and palaces were built throughout the country, as well as paved roads that linked the main cities like Heliopolis and Berytus. Indeed, starting in the last quarter of the 1st century BCE (reign of Augustus) and over a period of two centuries (reign of Philip the Arab), the Romans built a huge temples complex in Heliopolis on a pre-existing tell dating to the PPNB, consisting of three temples: Jupiter, Bacchus and Venus. On a nearby hill, they built a fourth temple dedicated to Mercury.

Berytus was considered the most Roman city in the eastern provinces of the Roman Empire. It was one of four Roman colonies in the Syria-Phoenicia region and the only one with full Ius Italicum (meaning: exemption from imperial taxation).

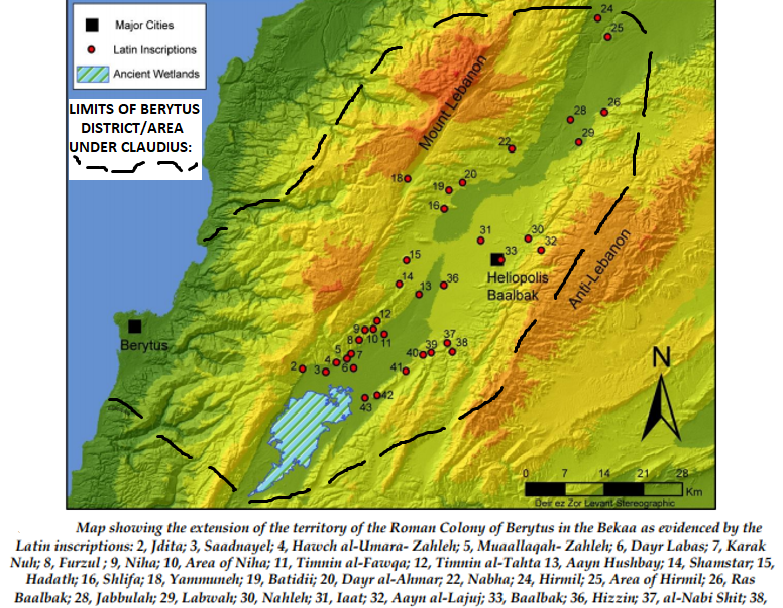
Map showing the Berytus district

Its territory/district under Claudius reached the Bekaa valley and included Heliopolis: it was the only area mostly Latin-speaking in the Syria-Phoenicia region, because settled by Roman colonists who even promoted agriculture in the fertile lands around actual Yammoune. From the 1st century BCE the Bekaa valley served as a source of grain for the Roman provinces of the Levant and even for the same Rome (today the valley makes up to 40 percent of Lebanon's arable land): Roman colonists created there even a "country district" called Pagus Augustus, where are located the famous Niha temples with Latin inscriptions.

Phoenicians would ascend to the throne of Rome during the Severan dynasty. The city of Heliopolis (now called Baalbek) was made a colonia by Septimius Severus (193–211) in 193 CE, having been part of the territory of Berytus on the Phoenician coast since 15 BCE. Work on the religious complex there lasted over a century and a half and was never completed. The dedication of the present temple ruins, the largest religious building in the entire Roman empire, dates from the reign of Septimus Severus, whose coins first show the two temples. The great courts of approach were not finished before the reigns of Caracalla (211–217 CE) and Philip the Arab (244–249 CE). In commemoration of the dedication of the new sanctuaries, Severus conferred the rights of the ius Italicum on the city. Today, only six Corinthian columns remain standing of this huge Jupiter temple.

Severus also separated the area of modern Lebanon and parts of Syria from the greater province of Syria Coele, and formed the new province of Phoenice.

Furthermore, the veterans of two Roman legions were established in the city of Berytus (actual Beirut): the fifth Macedonian and the third Gallic. The city quickly became Romanized. Large public buildings and monuments were erected and Berytus enjoyed full status as a part of the empire.

Under the Romans, Berytus was enriched by the dynasty of Herod the Great, and was made a colonia, Colonia Iulia Augusta Felix Berytus, in 14 BCE. Beirut's school of law was widely known at the time. Two of Rome's most famous jurists, Papinian and Ulpian, both natives of Phoenicia, taught at the law school under the Severan emperors. When Justinian assembled his Pandects in the 6th century, a large part of the corpus of laws were derived from these two jurists, and Justinian recognized the school as one of the three official law schools of the empire in 533 CE.

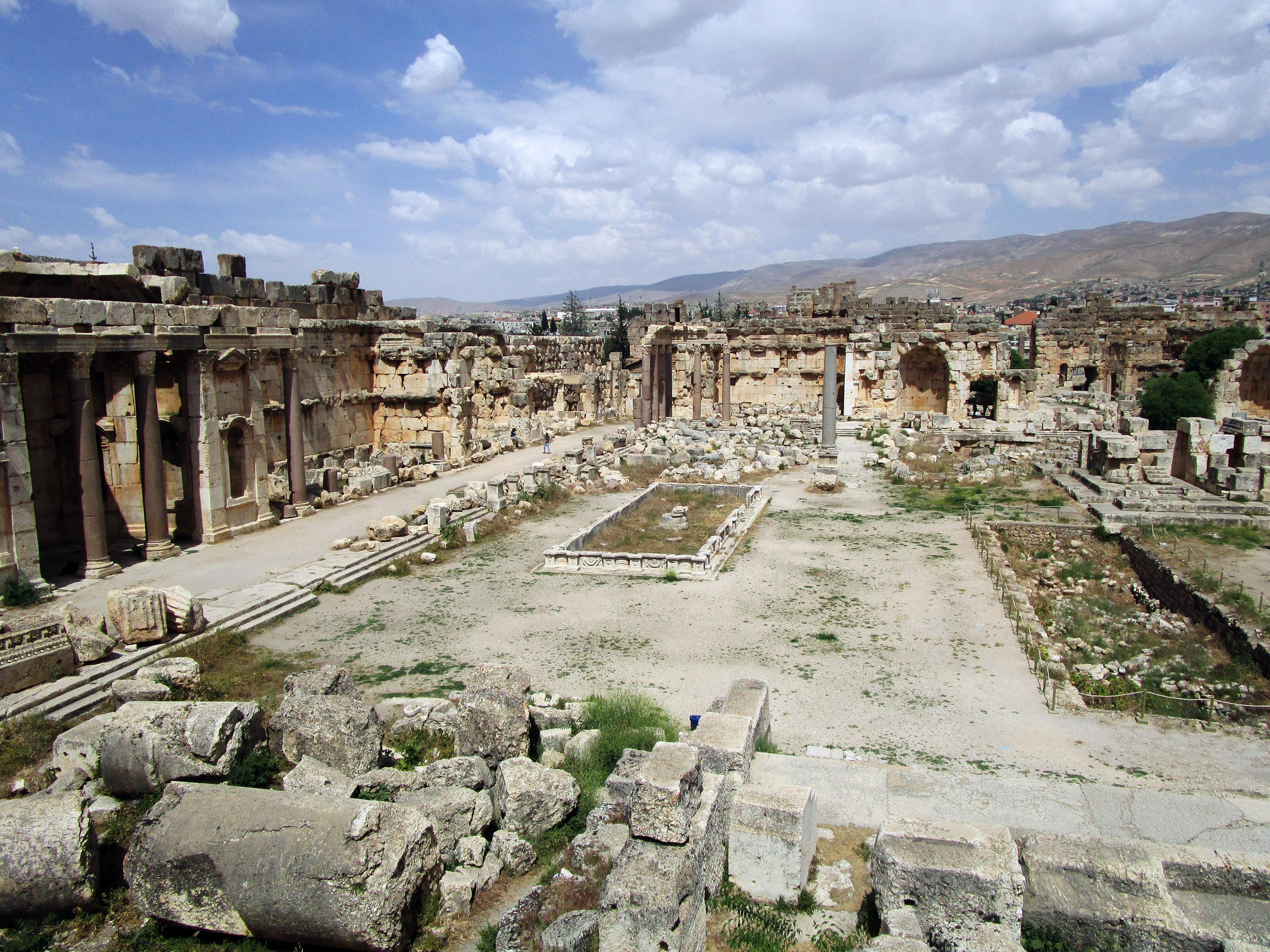
Ruins of the Great Court of Temples Complex in Baalbek

Upon the death of Theodosius I in 395 CE, the empire was divided in two: the eastern or Byzantine part with its capital at Constantinople, and the western part with its capital at Ravenna. Under the Byzantine Empire, intellectual and economic activities in Beirut, Tyre, and Sidon continued to flourish for more than a century. However, in the sixth century a series of earthquakes demolished the temples of Baalbek and destroyed the city of Beirut, leveling its famous law school and killing nearly 30,000 inhabitants. To these natural disasters were added the abuses and corruptions prevailing at that time in the empire. Heavy tributes and religious dissension produced disorder and confusion. Furthermore, the ecumenical councils of the fifth and sixth centuries CE were unsuccessful in settling religious disagreements. This turbulent period weakened the empire and made it easy prey to the newly converted Muslim Arabs of the Arabian Peninsula.

== Romanization of Berytus ==
Roman influence in Berytus began around the 1st century BCE as part of the Roman conquest of the Eastern Mediterranean. Marcus Agrippa helped to found the colony of Berytus before the combination of destructive earthquakes and the emerging Byzantine Empire concluded the Romanization period of Berytus around the 5th c. CE. While the Roman Empire conquered the city of Berytus, the relationship between Romans and the people of Berytus was mutualistically beneficial.

Romans were able to rely on Phoenicians' cities for goods and materials in which they acquired through trade. On the other hand, Romans provided economic activity for local Phoenician cities in which they traded agricultural and craft products (wine, oil, glass, purple, silk, textiles, ceramics) that were exported to Rome and other surrounding areas.

Roman influence in Berytus is visible through the social/cultural evidence, but also the physical/architectural evidence that has been exposed through archaeological excavations. Berytus became known as “Little Rome” and the “most Roman city” due to the amount of Roman influence, both physically and culturally, on the city.

=== Evidence of Roman architecture ===
Agrippa I, who was closely associated with Roman authorities, was a driving factor in the Romanization of Berytus. His Roman influence was shown through the implementation and construction of Roman baths, porticoes, a theater, and an amphitheater. The large amphitheater served as an arena to host gladiatorial shows, a traditional Roman experience. Other Roman buildings included academic buildings that allowed for Roman cultural influence through education. Additionally, evidence from cemeteries and death-related practices along the coast of Lebanon showed to be a combination of indigenous cultures, Roman influence, and also contained Hellenistic components as well.

=== Cultural impact of Roman influence ===
Shortly into the Romanization period of Berytus, the city attracted students from the Mediterranean region who desired to learn Roman law from elite professors. Local excavations at Berytus showed both Greek and Roman laws present in Berytus with evidence of a school for lawyers and teachers that formed around the 3rd century CE.

== Roman Temples in Lebanon ==
Today one of the best examples of Roman Temple architecture is in Lebanon at the ruins of Baalbek.

The Roman temple sites in Lebanon can be divided into three main groups. First, the Bekaa valley north of the Beirut-Damascus road. Second, the area south of the same road, including the Wadi al-Taym and the western flank of Mount Hermon. Third, the area west of a line drawn along the ridge of Mount Lebanon. In the coastal area of Lebanon there are not many Roman ruins.

It will be remarked that the coastal plain of Lebanon is singularly lacking in temple remains, but it must not be thought that the principal coastal cities went unembellished during the Roman era. Berytus, Byblos, Sidon, Tyre, Tripolis, Botrys (Batroon), Caesarea ad Libanum (Arka), were all prosperous enough to have mints and to strike coins under the Romans. There were certainly temples in all these cities; the coin types are sufficient evidence for this. The reverse of a coin of Berytus, for example, illustrates a temple of Astarte (Venus); this coin was struck during the reign of Caracalla (A.D. 211–217), and has the bust of his mother, Julia Domna, on the obverse side. A similar temple appears on the Byblos coinage, and this city struck under Macrinus, the successor to Caracalla, the well-known coin depicting a temple precinct and courtyard built round a baetyl, or sacred cone. But in these urban surroundings, ashlars and column drums were too useful to lie unused; from the Byzantines to the Ottomans, temple debris – particularly the dressed blocks – was utilized in buildings. Even a cursory examination of the medieval fortifications along the coast – at Byblos, for instance – will reveal the extent of the pilfering from Roman buildings. Door frames, lintels, architraves, even altars and inscribed stelae, can be seen in the lower courses of castle and church walls.

Agrippa greatly favoured the city of Berytus, and adorned it with a splendid theatre and amphitheatre, beside baths and porticoes, inaugurating them with games and spectacles of every kind, including shows of gladiators.

In two hundred and fifty years – from Augustus to Philip the Arab – were made all the Roman temples, with a very similar design: they show the golden era of Roman rule in Lebanon.

In the first century the worldwide famous temples in the area of Heliopolis (actual Baalbek) started to be built, using the nearby quarries with famous "Monoliths". The Temple of Jupiter in Heliopolis (in a complex area called even Sanctuary of Heliopolitan Zeus) was the biggest pagan temple in the classical world.

The (Jupiter) temple was begun in the last quarter of the 1st century B.C., and was nearing completion in the final years of Nero's reign (37–68 A.D.). the Great Court Complex of the temple of Jupiter, with its porticoes, exedrae, altars and basins, was built in the 2nd century A.D. Construction of the so-called temple of Bacchus was also started about this time.The Propylaea and the Hexagonal Court of the Jupiter temple were added in the 3rd century under the Severan Dynasty (193–235 A.D.) and work was presumably completed in the mid-3rd century. The small circular structure known as the Temple of Venus, was probably finished at this time as well. When Christianity was declared an official religion of the Roman Empire in 313 A.D., Byzantine Emperor Constantine officially closed the Baalbeck temples. At the end of the 4th century, the Emperor Theodosius tore down the altars of Jupiter's Great Court and built a basilica using the temple's stones and architectural elements. The remnants of the three apses of this basilica, originally oriented to the west, can still be seen in the upper part of the stairway of the Temple of Jupiter. Near the Temple of Venus are the remains of "The Temple of the Muses", dating from the beginning of the 1st century A.D. — Paul Reynolds

The presence of a huge quarry was one of the reasons for the Roman decision to create a huge "Great Court" of a big pagan temple complex in this mountain site, located at nearly 1100 meters of altitude and on the eastern Borders of the Roman Empire: it took three centuries to create this colossal Roman paganism's temple complex.

Under Constantine the Great Christianity was declared officially the religion of the Roman empire and the pagan Temples started to be neglected. Later the Byzantines used some materials from the abandoned temples

=== The Aftermath of the Roman Invasion in Phoenicia ===
Post-63 BCE, the Phoenician culture and its traits seemed to have disappeared. It is hypothesized that the Phoenician 'disappearance' stems from the fact that the Phoenicians were getting absorbed by the Greco-Roman culture.The word "Phoenician" was simply just a word of past tense that showed a person or place that was once its own civilization before the Romans. The Phoenician language, culture, religion, ethnicity, and political standings were not viable enough to give a person/place the name of Phoenician, as these traits were washed away. However, experts will argue over the fact that the Phoenicians are not a "...reflection or inversion of Greek and Roman civilization but in relation to it."

Christianity flooded Ancient Lebanon in hopes of guiding the people to assimilate to the Roman beliefs. The Phoenician gods and goddesses were eliminated from the force of Christianity. The people and the cities had to abide by the Christian teachings. Most of the Mediterranean sea regions relied heavily on the Gadir administration, known to be located in the South of the Iberian Peninsula and now situated in the city of Cádiz, Spain, this metropolis was the most important connection throughout the Western Mediterranean. However, the Gadir administration was overtaken by the Romans, where they implemented its organizational structures of Roman empire into Phoenicia and the other regions as part of the former administration.

In recent years, experts and archeologists excavated multiple burial places, or necropolises, in the city of Cádiz that helped Roman Empire decent. These discoveries are predicted to be from the 1 BCE to 1 CE and 4 CE to 1 CE. These grave cites were Roman but they displayed a distinctive likeness with a Phoenician burial. Scholars have made the prediction that these burial cities were performed by the Bomans but the individuals buried are of Phoenician descent.

The Roman citizenship became universal across their conquered lands, and a result of this, as described previously, Beirut would become the most famous Roman Law School. "By 250, and likely earlier, there was no Phoenician "people," only Romans living in the provinces called Phoenice." The regions that were known to be "Phoenician" were given new names that were pseudo-ethnonyms, this did not cut the geographical regions off completely from Phoenicia, but gave it loose ties to the former region. The grave held grave goods that showed Phoenician habits, but also held exotic objects that are from abroad regions.

The Phoenicians were not the only ones feeling this Roman wave of over them, the Greeks were enduring the influence of the Romans, too. These Mediterranean regions were trying their hardest to combat the "co-opted nation", to hold against this, the nations had to make it known of their assertion to not be overcome; and to promote cultural difference, this is to distinguish the homeland culture from the push of Romans beliefs.

The city of Emesa, in the third and fourth century, was labeled as a Phoenician city from ancient literature. However, it was found that Emesa was not Phoenician, and instead labeled as Arab. There were no signs of the city being of Phoenician descent, as the language was not spoken there. Excavations found in Emesa are inscribed in Greek, and some in Latin. The city was annexed by Syria, then broke off and became a part of Syria Phoenice. From here on, the city was given a foundation of Roman imperialism. It is seen thought that Emesa was in association with Phoenicia. The overall strike through the Phoenician label to bear the characteristics of Roman became a regular activity in the region during this time.

=== Carthage and the Roman Empire ===
As Rome heads west across the Mediterranean Sea, they come across Carthage, modern-day Tunisia. Some think of ancient Carthage to have been their own empire, founded by Dido, where the region exhibited strength and power amongst its neighbors.

In 317 BCE, tyrant Agathocles came to power in ancient Syracuse, a city in Sicily. Agathocles "...filled the cities of Sicily with outrage and slaughter" In the history of Sicily, there had never been a Tyrant like him, his abuse and brutality gave him power over the people. With Agathocles being granted complete and absolute control of Sicily, he took his army of thousands and continued to control the rest of the most prominent cities in Sicily. With word of this tyrant scavenging through his own cities, Carthage became afraid of what would happen to their armies that they held in Sicily. Carthage then sent their forces over to Sicily to restrain Agathocles conquest to destroy their strongholds.

Unfortunately, this did not go in the favor of the Carthaginians, and in return, Agathocles drew up plans to rid the remaining Carthaginians in Sicily. The tyrant made an elite army and planned to set sail for Africa to attack Carthage. The Carthaginians ended up defeating Agathocles. The Syracusan army was weakened, putting the tyrant in a panic. He made a secret plan to save himself and a few of his closest men, word got around of this betrayal to his men and he was arrested. However, he managed to escape and flee from the army. The betrayed troops of Agathocles decided to make peace with Carthage. Agathocles tried to get revenge, with the little he had left. Agathocles was killed using poison in 289 BCE. This prompted for Sicily and Carthage to draft treaties to maintain compliance with one another. However, in 279 BCE, their fourth treaty was drawn, it established mutual aid and. defense against a common enemy, Pyrruhus, King of Epirus. Pyrruhus settled in Sicily and quickly made the island of Sicily his own territory.

Sicily and Carthage defeated Pyrruhus and his army, drawing him out of Sicily. After this defeat, Carthage landed itself in the horizon of Rome. Thus, began the First Punic War, from 264 BCE to 241 BCE, the war was ended with yet again, another treaty stating that Sicily was now of Rome's possession and a payment was demanded due to the damages from the war. This left Carthage desperate as the only option for expansion was Spain, but Spain was already secured.

The Second Punic Wars (218 BCE to 202 BCE) struck Carthage and Rome following the assassination of Hasdrubal, where Hannibal prompted this war. Carthage fought Rome on the basis of the burdensome demands and lack of peace that the treaties were supposed to impose. In the end, the Carthaginian Army was destroyed, and endured even more debt, and "... had to undertake never to go to war without the consent of Rome." After all of this, the Third Punic War arose. The war resulted in Rome ultimately ending Carthage and destroying the city, once again.

The Carthaginian territory became a province of Rome. Unlike, the Phoenicians, who lost their culture, the Carthaginian language, religion, and culture was preserved for years after the defeat. It is true that Carthage lost the Punic Wars to Rome; however Rome allowed Carthage and other African cities were given the label of free cities and became formal cities of the Roman Empire. Rome made this decision because Carthage and their allies were once loyal allies to the empire. Therefore, the Punic world was able to live on.

== Gallery ==
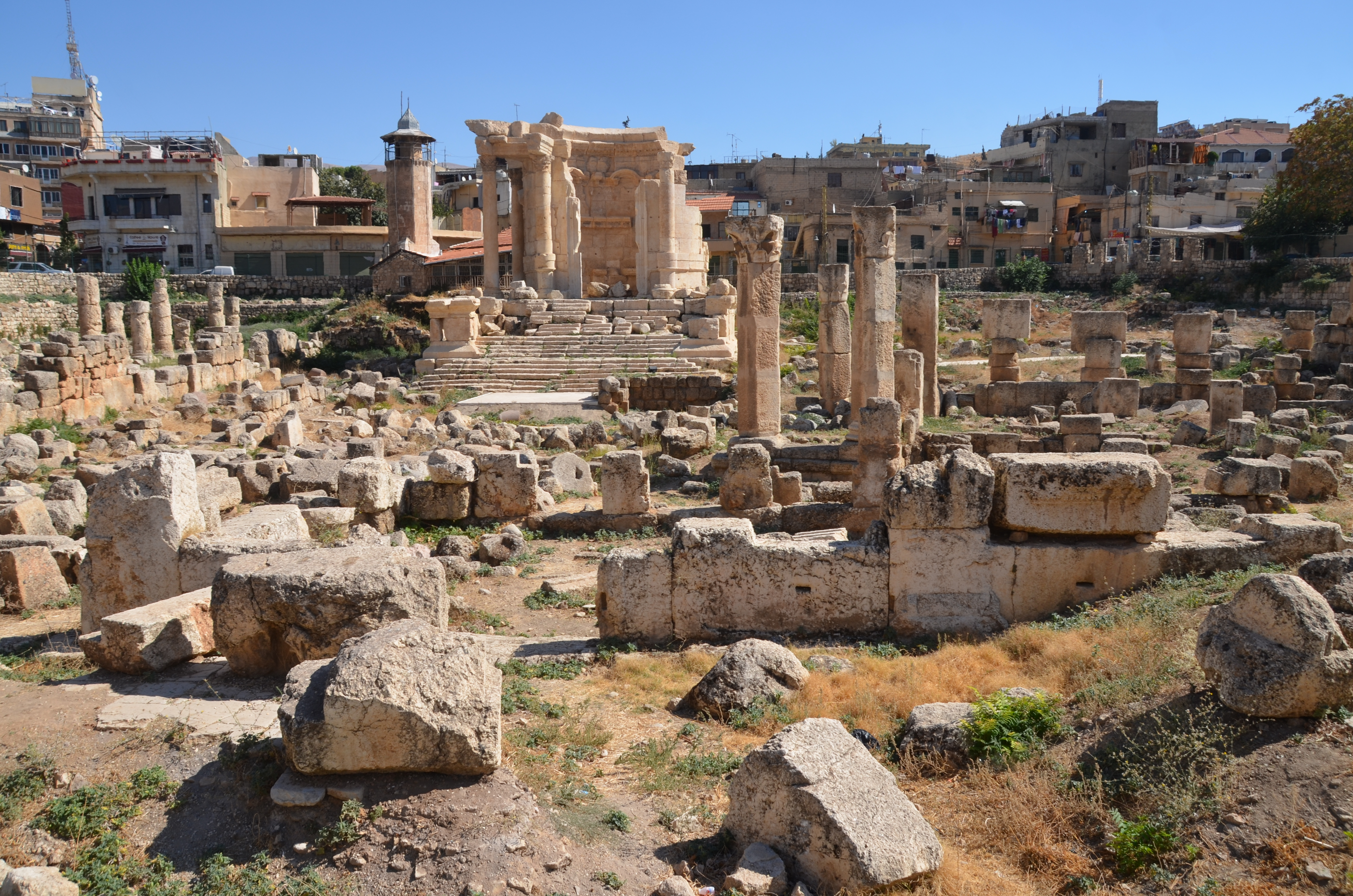
The Round Temple and the Temple of the Muses located outside the sanctuary complex, Baalbek

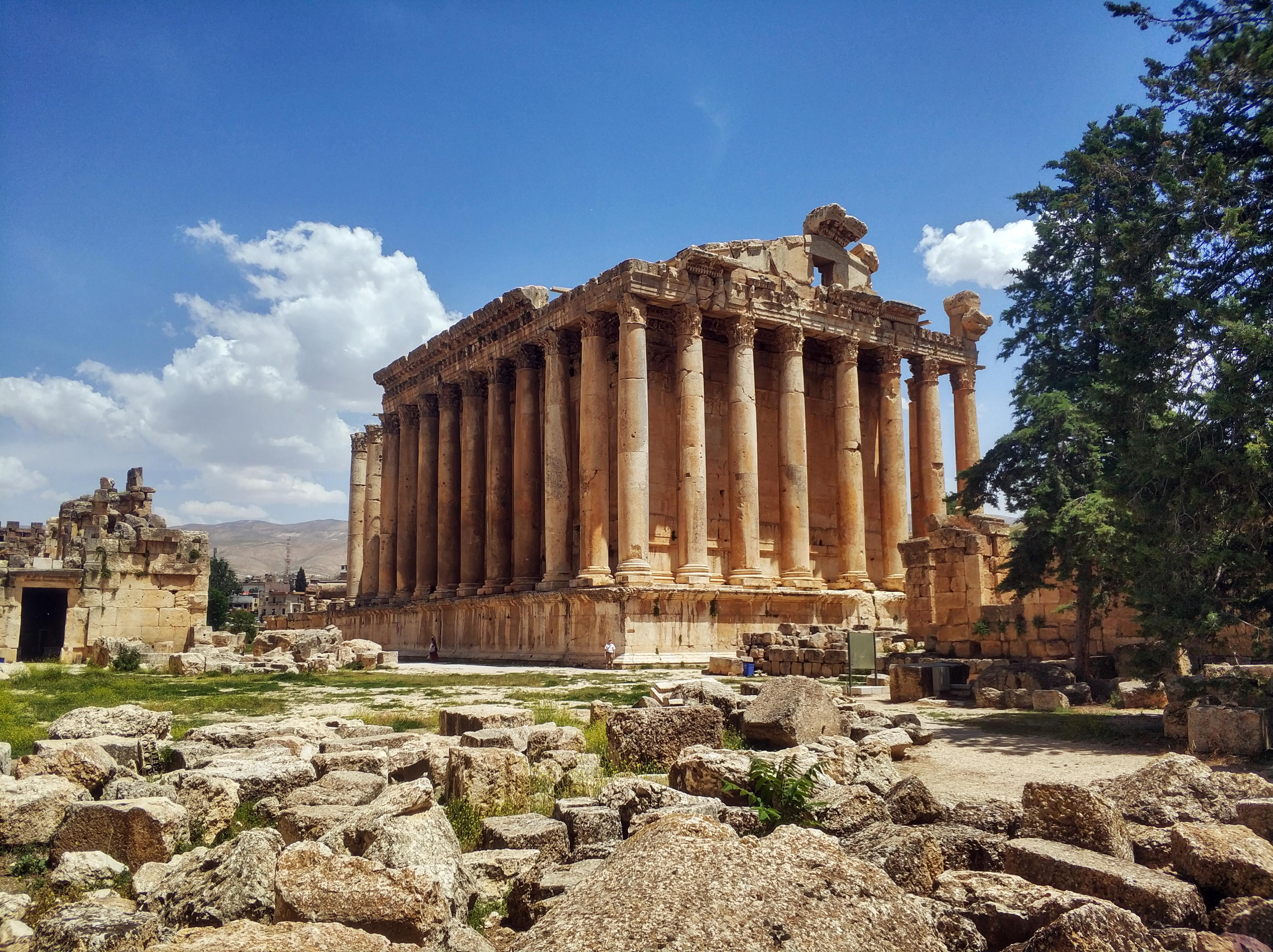
Temple of Bacchus, Baalbek

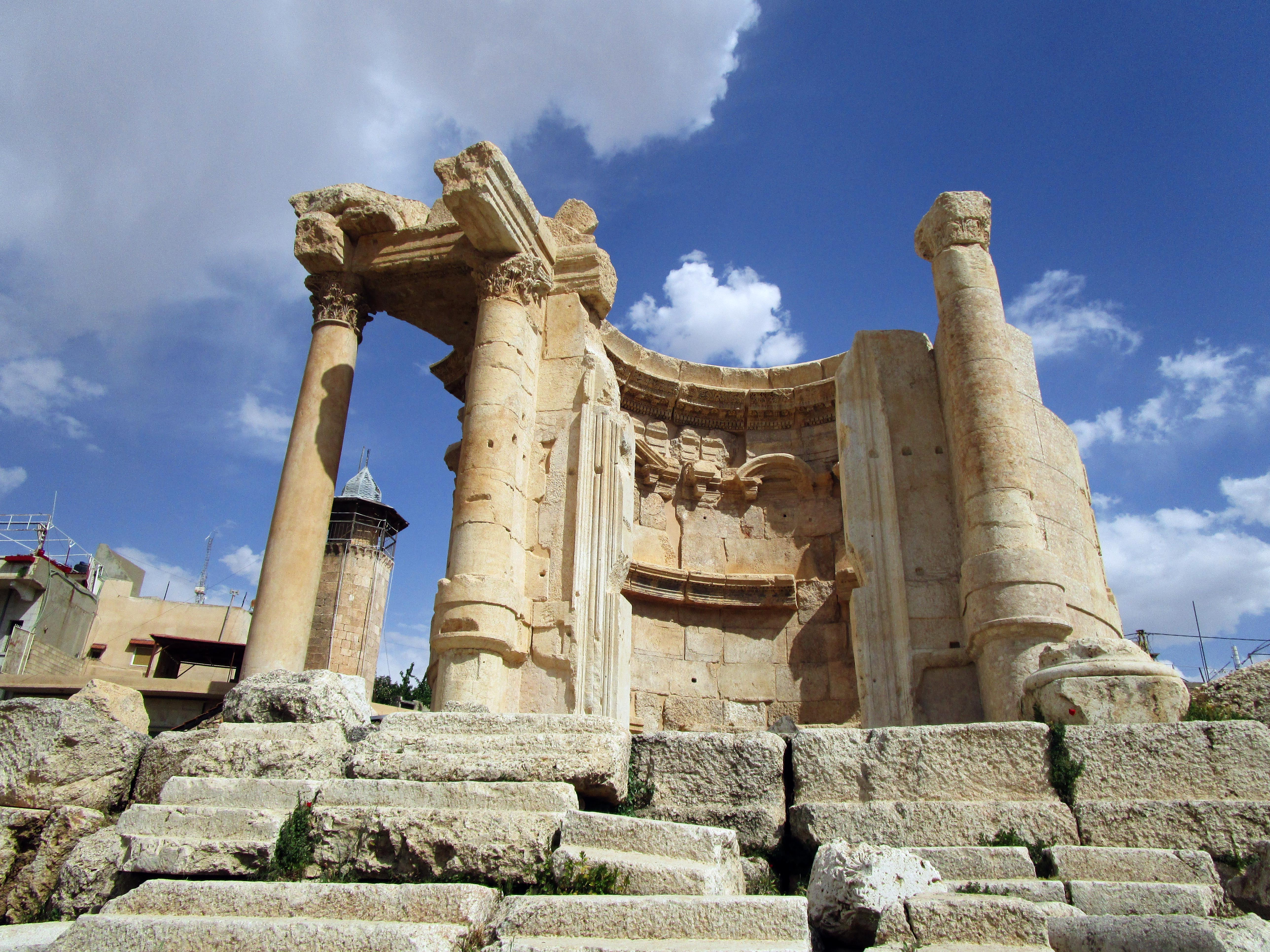
Temple of Venus, Baalbek

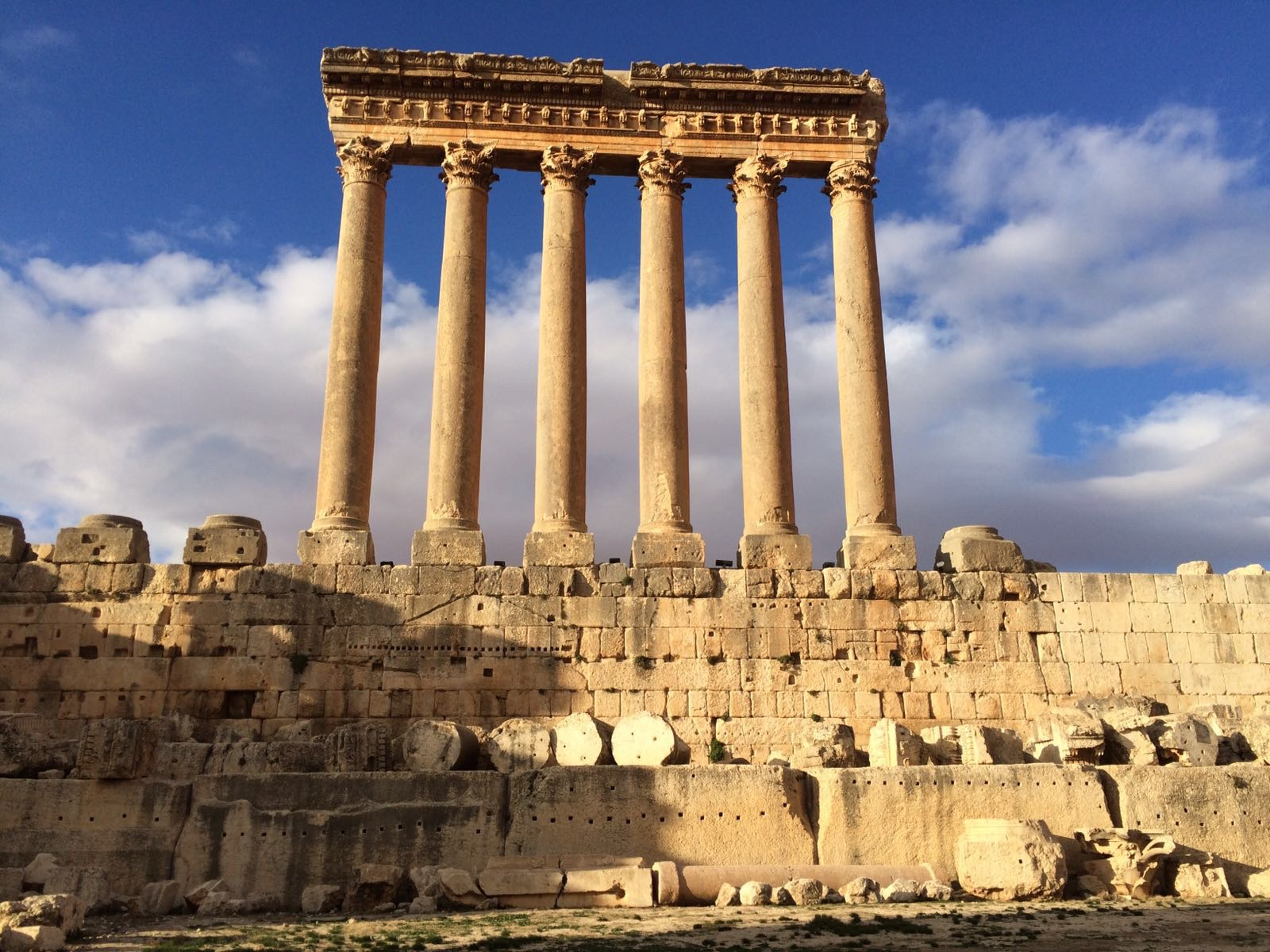
Temple of Jupiter, Baalbek

== See also ==
- Phoenicia under Babylonian rule
- Phoenicia under Hellenistic rule
- History of ancient Lebanon

== Bibliography ==
- Beydoun, Ahmad. Le Liban, une histoire disputée: identité et temps dans l'histoire libanaise contemporaine Beyrouth, Publications de l'Université Libanaise, 1984.
- Carter, Terry & Dunston, Lara. Libano Torino, EDT, 2004. ISBN 88-7063-748-4
- Hall, Linda J. Roman Berytus: Beirut in late antiquity. Psychology Press. London, 2004 ISBN 978-0-415-28919-1
- Sartre, Maurice. Les provinces de Méditerranée orientale d'Auguste aux Sévères. Points. Paris, 1997
- Doak, Brian R., and Carolina López-Ruiz (eds), The Oxford Handbook of the Phoenician and Punic Mediterranean, Oxford Handbooks (2019; online edn, Oxford Academic, 12 Aug. 2019),
- Herm, Gerhard (1975). The Phoenicans The Purple Empire of the Ancient World. William Morrow and Company, Inc. ISBN 0-688-02908-6.
- Kaldellis, Anthony, 'Neo-Phoenician Identities in the Roman Empire', in Brian R. Doak, and Carolina López-Ruiz (eds), The Oxford Handbook of the Phoenician and Punic Mediterranean, Oxford Handbooks (2019; online edn, Oxford Academic, 12 Aug. 2019),
- Quinn, Josephine Crawley, 'Phoenicians and Carthaginians in Greco-Roman Literature', in Brian R. Doak, and Carolina López-Ruiz (eds), The Oxford Handbook of the Phoenician and Punic Mediterranean, Oxford Handbooks (2019; online edn, Oxford Academic, 12 Aug. 2019),
- Gomes, Cláudia, et al. "Maternal Lineages during the Roman Empire, in the Ancient City of Gadir (Cádiz, Spain): The Search for a Phoenician Identity." Genealogy 7.2 (2023): 27. ProQuest. Web. 8 May 2024.
- Bullitt, Orville H. (1978). Phoenicia and Carthage A Thousand Years to Oblivion. Dorrance and Company. pp.87-97. ISBN 0-8059-2562-7.
- Moscati, Sabatino (1968). The World of the Phoenicians. Praeger Publishers. pp. 123–135. ISBN 0-3511-7404-4
