= Niha, Zahlé =

Niha نيحا
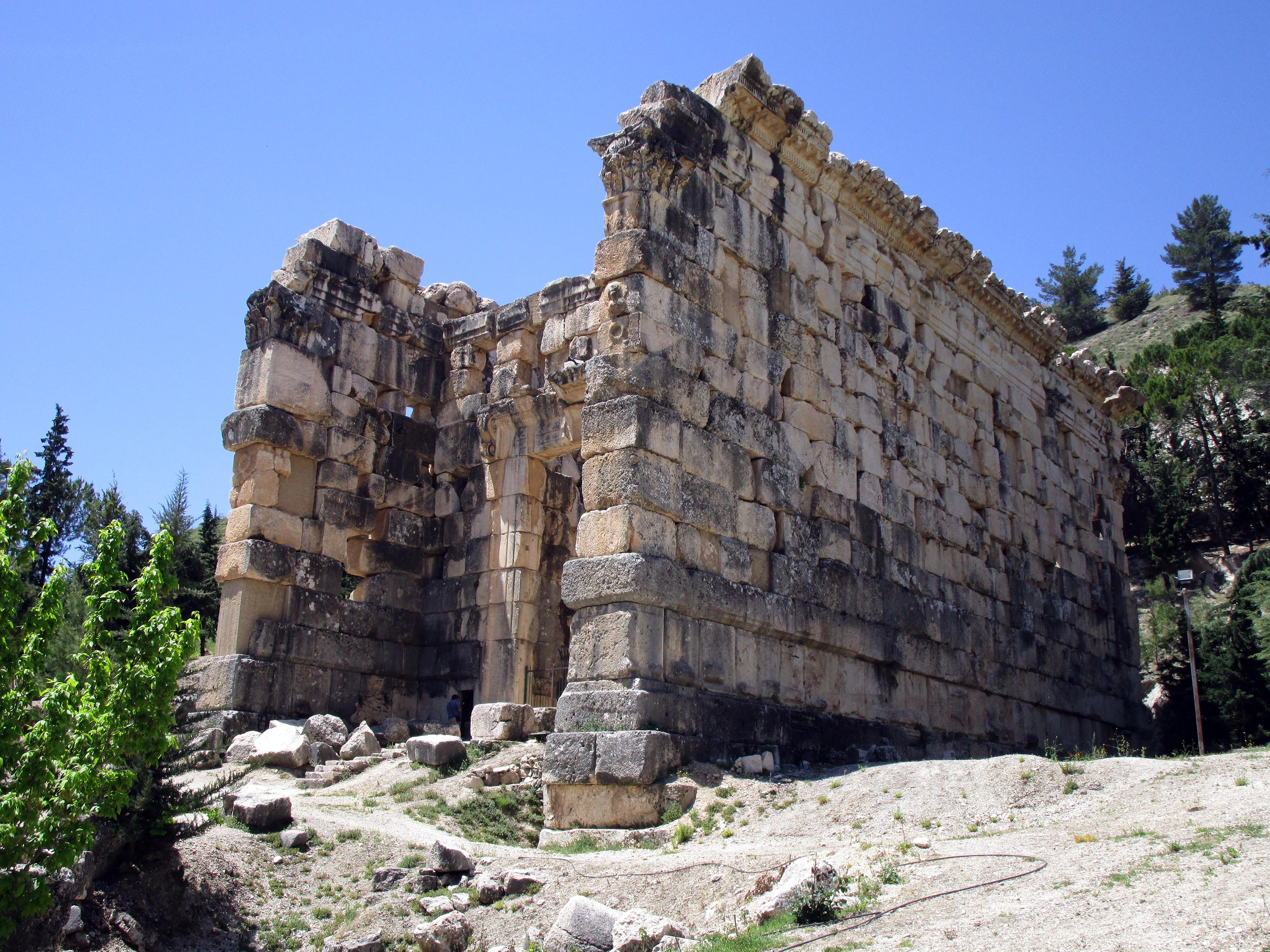
- The Lower Great Roman temple in Niha, Bekaa

- Location within Lebanon
- Coordinates: 33°53′41″N 35°57′49″E
- Country: Lebanon
- Governorate: Beqaa Governorate
- District: Zahle District

Area
  - Total: 3.7 sq mi (9.7 km^{2})
- Elevation: 3,600 ft (1,100 m)

Population (2008)
  - Total: 3,400 (est.)

Niha (Arabic: نيحا, romanized: Nīḥā [ˈniħa]) is a village in the Bekaa Valley about 18 km (5.0 mi) north of Zahlé. It is famous for its Roman archeological ruins in the outskirts, and in particular two lower Roman temples that date back to the 1st century AD.

== Etymology ==
The name Niha is used by four Lebanese towns or villages: Niha, Zahlé in the Bekaa; Niha, Batroun; Niha, Tyre and Niha, Chouf. The word neeha is Syriac and denotes to the place the character of calm, peaceful.

== Geography and climate ==
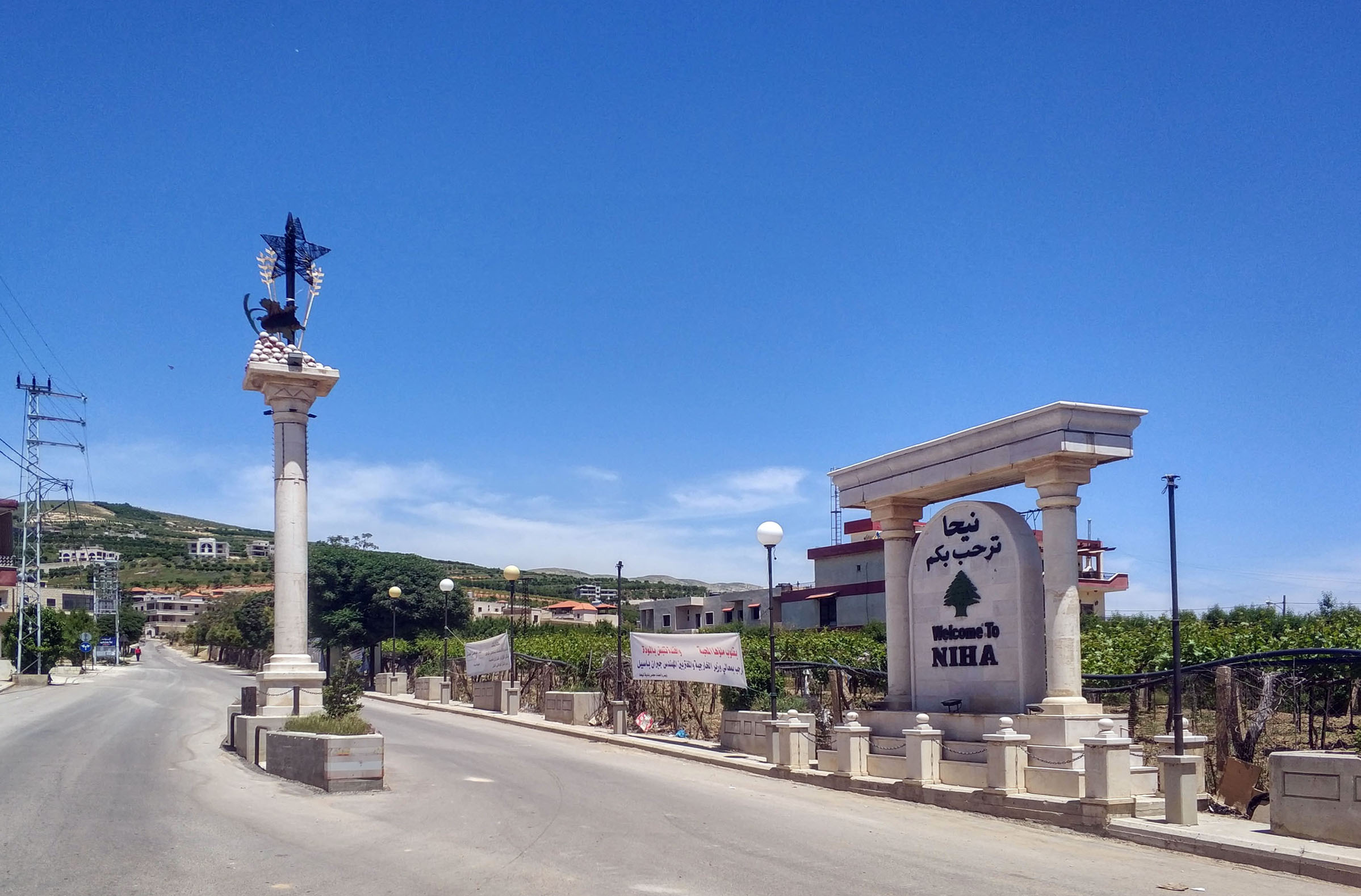
Niha

The village is located about 65km east of the Lebanese capital Beirut off the main road that leads to Baalbeck. It is 8km north of Zahlé and nearly 2km north-east of the town of Ablah. The village sits in a small canyon at an average altitude of 1,100 m (3,600 ft). It is surrounded by fast rising hills with vertical drops of 150 m (490 ft). The canyon narrows and rises to the back country of Niha also known as the "Hosn" (in Arabic, hosn means fortress) at an approximate elevation of 1,350 m (4,430 ft). The mountains continue to rise over some ten kilometers to reach the top of Mount Sannine at 2,628 m (8,622 ft).

Niha is bordered to the west by the high rising mountains of Mount Lebanon and the peak of Mount Sannine, to the north by the village of Tamnine, to the south by the villages of Nabi Ayla (Arabic: نبي أيلا) and Forzol (Arabic: ألفرزل), and to the east by Ablah and the fertile plains of the Bekaa. Niha's climate is arid and temperate. Temperatures average 27 C (80 F) in the dry summer season, with occasional heat waves that can reach 40 C (105 F). Winters are cool and tend to be wet. Annual rain fall is approximately 500 mm (20 in) and snow fall can reach 1 m (3.3 ft). Winter temperatures average 5 C (40 F) but occasionally dip to -10 C (15 F).

The landscape at the lower elevation appears from a distance bleached as limestone is dominant in the soil. Red soil mixed with limestone make the ground fertile for agriculture which dominates the economy of the village (and that of the Bekaa Valley). The temperate and dry climate, and high elevation make the village suitable to grow a variety of fruits. Grapevines, cherry, almond and apple orchards dot the terraced hills. The village as well as the rest of the Bekaa produce the bulk of the fruits in Lebanon and export significant volumes to the Arab countries.

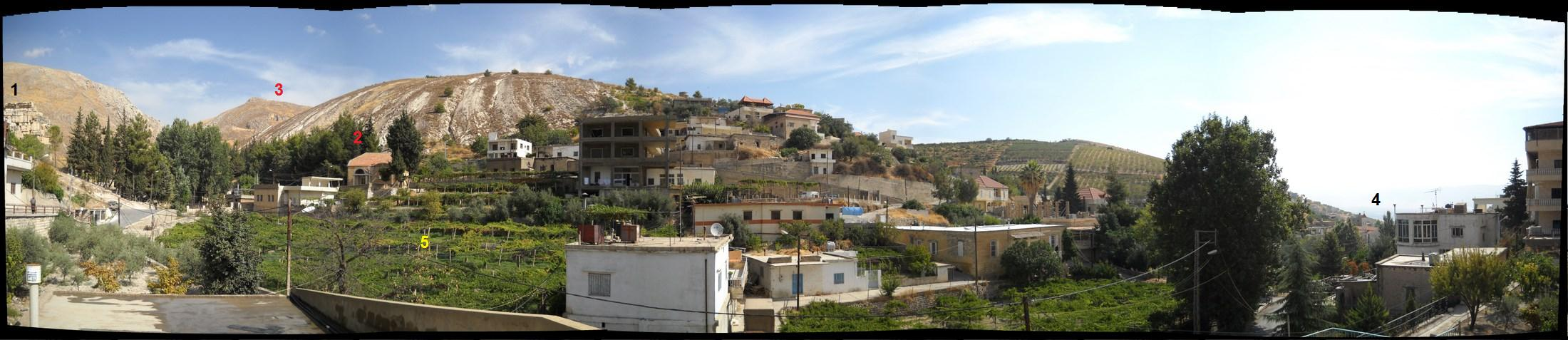
A panorama photograph of Niha, Zahle. The Lower Great Temple in the village is barely visible to the far left (1). The red roof of the church of the Prophet Elias is seen about a quarter of the photograph from the left (2). The old Roman quarries can be seen in the distance (3) on the way to the Hosn of Niha. Rayak and the Bekaa plain are to the far right (4). Some of the village's vineyards are also visible (5).

Niha gets its primary water from underground water tables as well as several springs in the hills above the village. The snow melt filtered through the limestone gives the water an appealing freshness with a light taste of calcite. A new wastewater treatment plant was planned to be established in 2009 with the assistance of USAID for the villages of Niha, Ablah and Nabi Ayla.

== History ==
The village of Niha was important during the Roman Empire, when some temples were built at Hosn Niha. It was part of the important Augusti Pagus.

Christianity substituted Paganism in the second century and since then remained present in the area until now, with the development of Maronism.

Ottoman tax registers from 1533 to 1548 indicate the village had 51 households, all Muslims.

The 19th century witnessed the migration of Christian families from Mount Lebanon (notably Keserwan and Matn regions) to the Bekaa. Spotty records indicate that an agreement was forged in the 19th century between the Shiite and Christian clans to exchange territories. The Christians of Tamnine exchanged lands with the Shiite inhabitants of Niha, the result of which Tamnine became a majority Shiite village, and Niha became a majority Christian village.

== Archeology ==
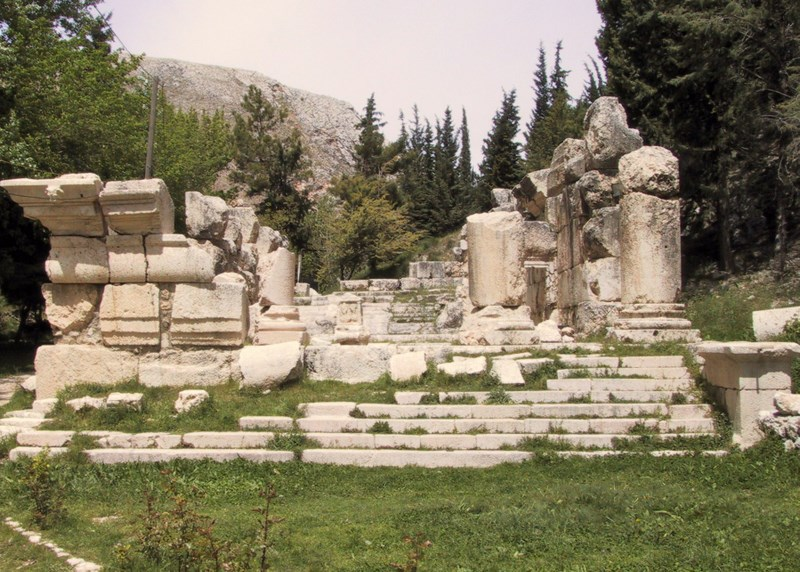
The Lower Small Temple

Niha is home to four Roman temples that were constructed between the 1st and 3rd century AD. The Lower two temples are located on the edge of the village, and the upper two temples are about 2km above the village in what is known as "Hosn" Niha.

The first and smallest Roman temple was built in the 1st century AD. As one enters the gate at the edge of the village into the archeological park that is maintained by the Department of Antiquities, the Lower Small Temple appears first and directly ahead to the right of the creek. The temple was dedicated to the Syro-Phoenician mermaid goddess Atargatis and her consort, the god Hadaranes. Hadaranes is the local name of Hadad, the god of thunder, lightning and rain. Atargatis is the goddess of fertility. A small water channel runs through the podium of the temple leading to the belief that water purification rituals were conducted at the temple. The entrance of the temple faces south; it consists of a stairway leading to a portico with four columns with Ionic-style capitals. The cella, or central space of the temple, is accessed through three doors at the top of the stairway, and the restricted adytum is accessed by a stairway of nine steps at the end of the cella. The statue of the god or goddess was located inside the adytum and was usually not accessible to the public. In addition to the water channel running through and around the podium, there is also a smaller water channel that runs from the base of the statue of the god or goddess in the adytum down to the center of the cella. In the remains of this temple, archaeologists discovered a stone with an inscription mentioning a “female virgin prophet” named Hochmea. Hochmea was the priestess of Hadaranes and Atargatis; she dedicated herself to those two gods and cut herself off from the world. The stone inscription says: "According to an order from the god, she stopped eating bread for 20 years and lived for 100 years." This stone was removed by archaeologists and is no longer located at the temple site. This small temple was apparently used for the public cult, which allowed everyone to participate in purification rituals.

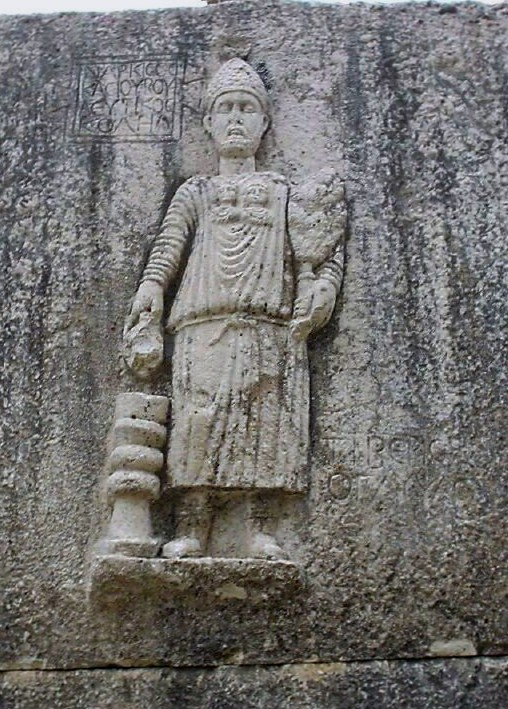
The statue of the priest at the entrance of the Lower Great Temple

Opposite the creek lies the Great Temple which was extensively restored by the government of Lebanon in the 1950s. Towering nearly 20 m (66 ft), the temple was built during the 2nd and 3rd centuries AD and was apparently used for a mysterious cult that spread during that era, similar to the temple of Bacchus in Baalbeck. The temple was also dedicated to the god Hadaranes and goddess Atargatis, as well as to a young god who played the role of their son. The entrance of the temple faces east; it is built over a large podium and accessed through a three-part stairway leading to a portico with four columns with Corinthian-style capitals. To the left of the stairway, a carved relief depicts a priest with two icons on his chest, representing a god and a goddess. He is wearing a hat with a crescent carved on it, and he holds a floral water sprinkler in his left hand and a cup in his right hand, which pours holy water onto a small altar.

The lintel of the gigantic temple door has an eagle with spread wings carved on it. This eagle is similar to the one carved on the lintel of the temple of Bacchus in Baalbeck. However, the Niha carving is slightly different, because the eagle holds a floral crown in one of its talons and a palm leaf in the other. To the right side of the lintel, a carved relief represents a winged naked boy holding a palm leaf in his left hand. Next to the boy is a carving of a winged goddess of victory holding a palm leaf in her left hand and a crown in her right hand, raising the crown towards the head of the boy. The left side of the lintel has a carved relief representing the same goddess of victory with the same items in her hands. The carvings appear to be linked to the mysterious rituals that were performed inside the temple. These rituals were related to the issues of birth, growth, death, and the hope of an afterlife.

The inside of the Great Temple consists of two parts: the cella, where the people used to gather, and the elevated adytum, which was accessed by a stairway. The adytum used to hold the statue of the god or goddess. Under the elevated adytum is a crypt, which held the items used during the ceremonies and rituals of the temple. The doorway leading to the crypt is decorated with a carved relief representing a priest pouring holy water over an altar. Next to him, a woman holds an undefined object in her right hand. To the left, the relief represents a winged boy riding over a sheep or a bull.

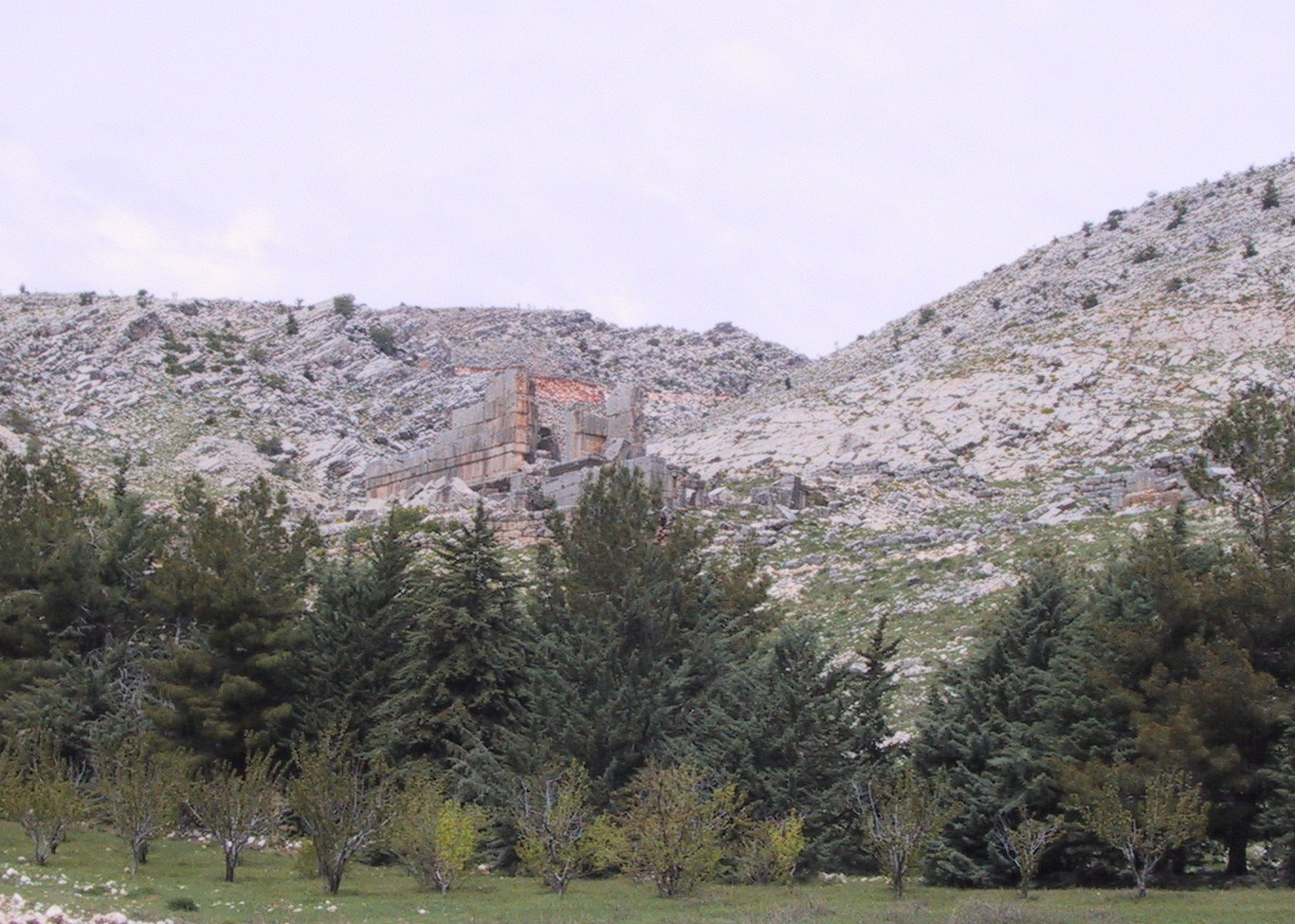
The Upper Great Roman Temple in the Hosn of Niha

The Small Temple of Niha is oriented north–south, while the Great Temple is oriented east–west. During the excavations of the site, an oratory was discovered in front of the Small Temple. The oratory had an altar representing the goddess of Niha, surrounded by a number of steles sculpted in the local style (not Roman style). The reason for the perpendicular orientation of the two temples is the presence of this monumental altar, which was situated in front of the Small Temple, and which was used as a base for the orientation of the Great Temple.

Two other Upper Roman temples were constructed at the Hosn, approximately 2 km away from the two temples mentioned earlier. Located at an elevation of 1,400 m (4,600 ft) with difficult road access, these two temples are not restored. Architectural evidence at the site indicates that it was transformed into a small fort during the medieval period (hence the name of Hosn). Built on a podium facing toward the east, the Upper Great Temple is composed of a portico with four columns, leading to a cella, and then to an elevated adytum. Today, the temple site is reasonably well preserved – most of its walls are intact, but its columns are no longer standing. The altar in front of the temple was destroyed by a Byzantine Basilica that was built over it. The Basilica has three naves and a semi-circular apse to its east end. The lower portions of the Basilica walls remain visible today. The second Small Temple opens to the south and was accessed through a stairway that is almost completely destroyed today. The stairway leads to a portico with two columns, and then to a small cella with a small niche at its end, which used to hold the statue of the god or goddess.

== Modern population ==
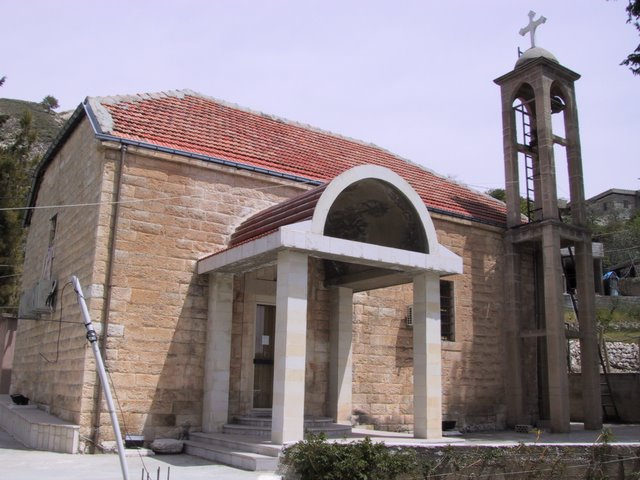
Church of the Prophet Elias

It is common in Lebanon that all voters return to their claimed village of ancestry for suffrage regardless of their place of residence in the country. The municipality of Niha states there are 1,260 registered voters in the village, and approximately 1,000 permanent residents in the village. Of the more than 2,000 individuals who claim Niha as their hometown but reside elsewhere, nearly 400 reside outside Lebanon. The summer population swells considerably as vacationers with family ties to the village flock to the village from the Lebanese coastline or abroad (including the United States, Canada, European Union, Brazil, Argentina or Australia). The population is made of several family surnames, most notably Maalouf (معلوف), Ayoub (أيوب), Rmeily (رميلي), Fakhry (فخري), Hrawi (هراوي), Najjar (نجار), Kerbaje (كرباج), Rabbah (رباح), Abu Deyye (ابو ديه), Harb (حرب), Ghanem (غانم), Ziadeh (زيادة), Allam (علام), and Sharafeddine (شرف ألدين). The families live together in peace and harmony, and provide each other with assistance characteristic of tightly knit village societies. The village population is vastly Christian, split between the Maronite Christians and Greek Orthodox Christians, with a few families that follow Shia Islam. All faiths have peacefully coexisted in the village without a record of violent incidents due to religious differences. The Church of the Prophet Elias (Arabic: مار إلياس) was built c. 1880 and serves the villagers of the Greek Orthodox faith. The Church of Saint Antonios (Arabic: مار أنطونيوس) serves the Maronites in the village.

Until the 1960s, the population dressed in traditional Lebanese costumes, notably the male sherwal garment characterized by baggy pants and headdresses, or the gambaz, a long gown worn by both sexes. As the population modernized and education became widespread, western dresses became the norm. Traditional dresses are only worn today during celebratory festivities.

The primary economic engine of the village is agriculture. The village produce includes grapes, apples, cherries, almonds, that are then transported to Zahlé, Beirut or exported to Arab countries. Albeit modern amenities such as telephones are now available in the village, the residents continue to live by century-old practices such as storing food supplies for the winter season. During the summer, villagers are seen busy preparing kishk (Arabic: كشك) a specialty powdery dish made from cracked wheat and yogurt. Arak (Arabic: عرق) is also one of the specialties of the village especially using locally grown grapes.

Whereas illiteracy was common at the beginning of the 20th century, the literacy rate today is very high, and likely higher than the average literacy rate in Lebanon. The village is home to a secondary education school ( ثانوية نيحا) and boasts a high concentration of college graduates including medical doctors, engineers, scientists and teachers.

== Musical events ==
The village municipality along with the Ministry of Tourism sponsor the annual International Festival of Music in Niha, covering classical Western and Arabic music.

== Niha Gallery ==
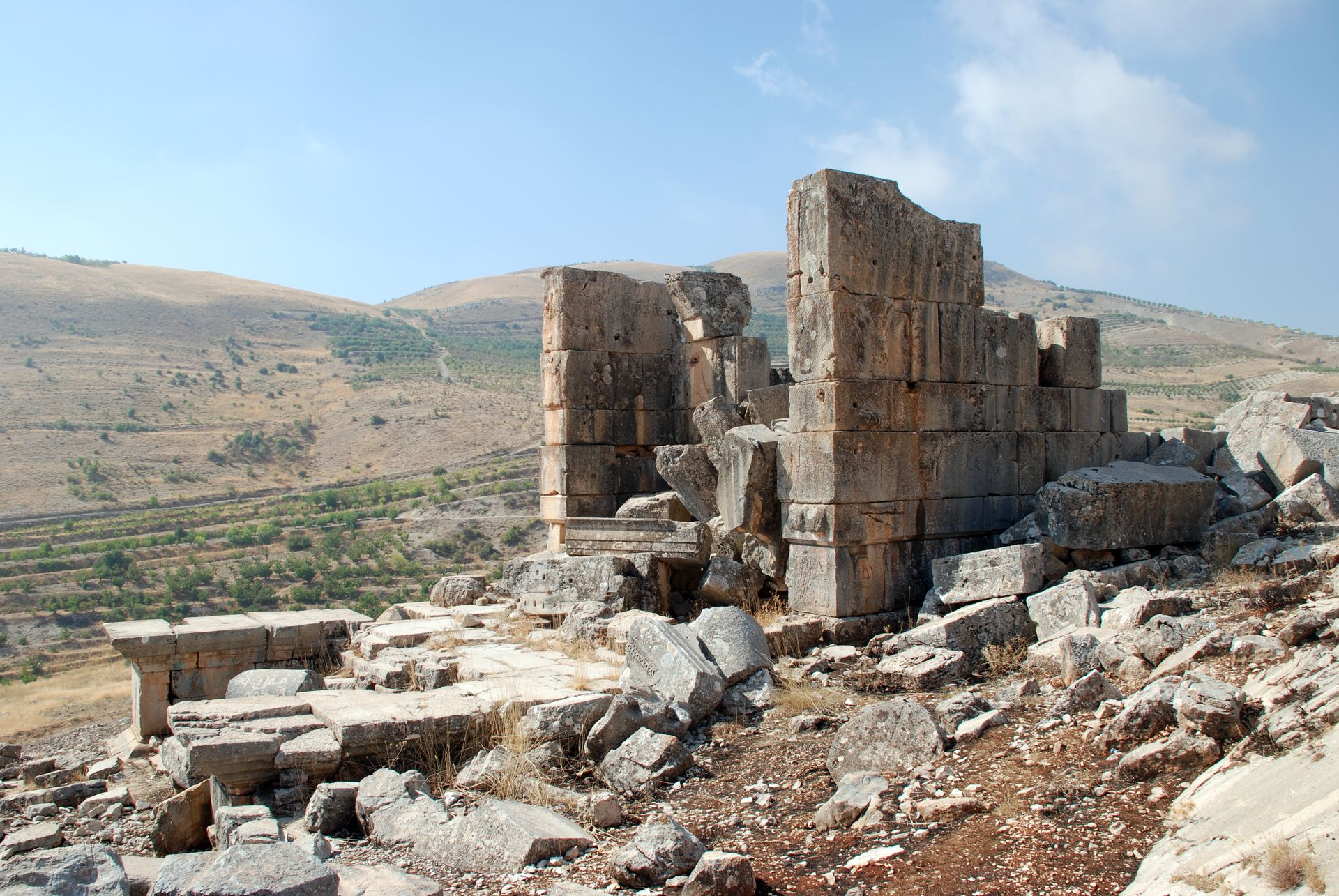
Roman temple of Hosn Niha, Lebanon

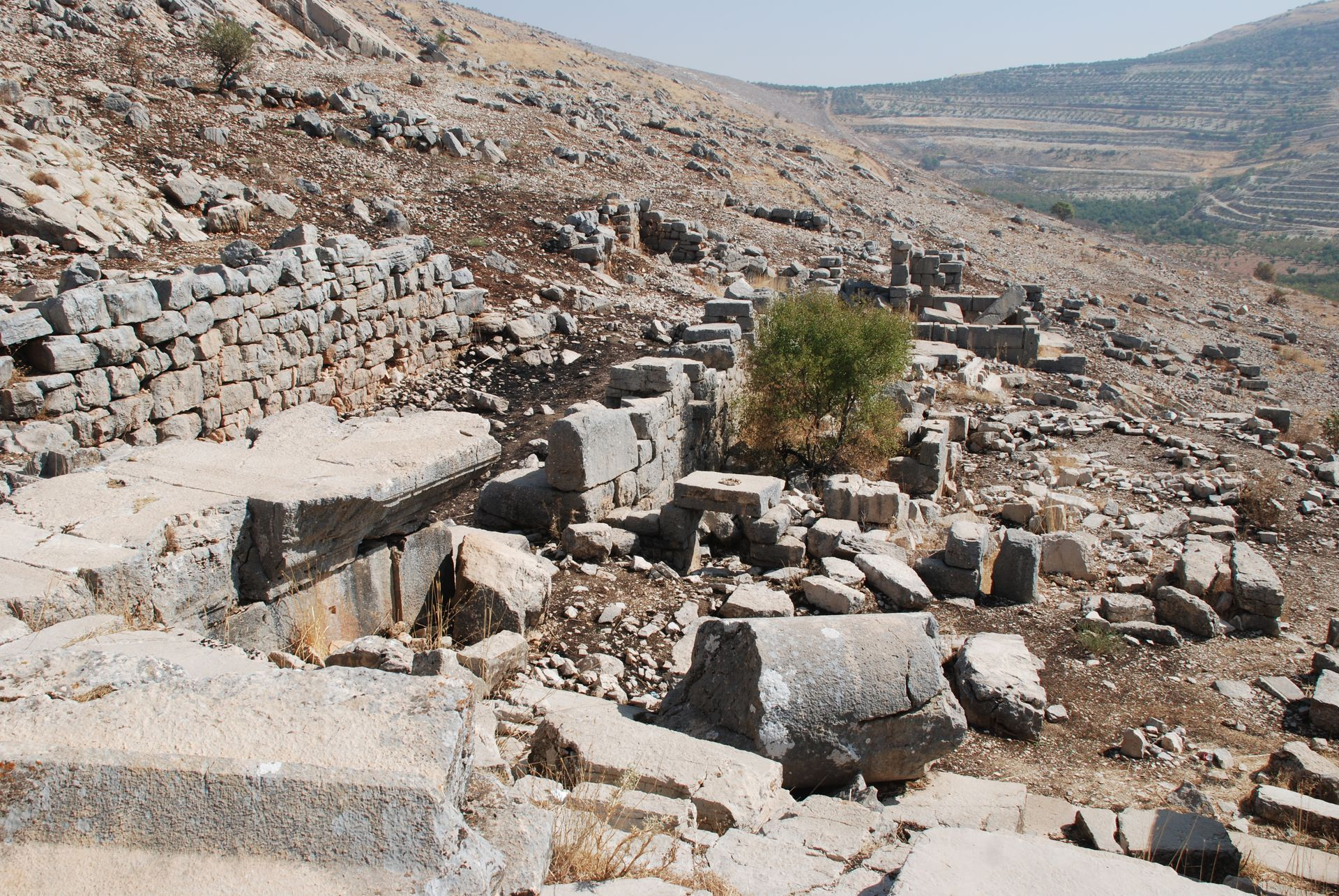
Roman temple of Hosn Niha, Lebanon

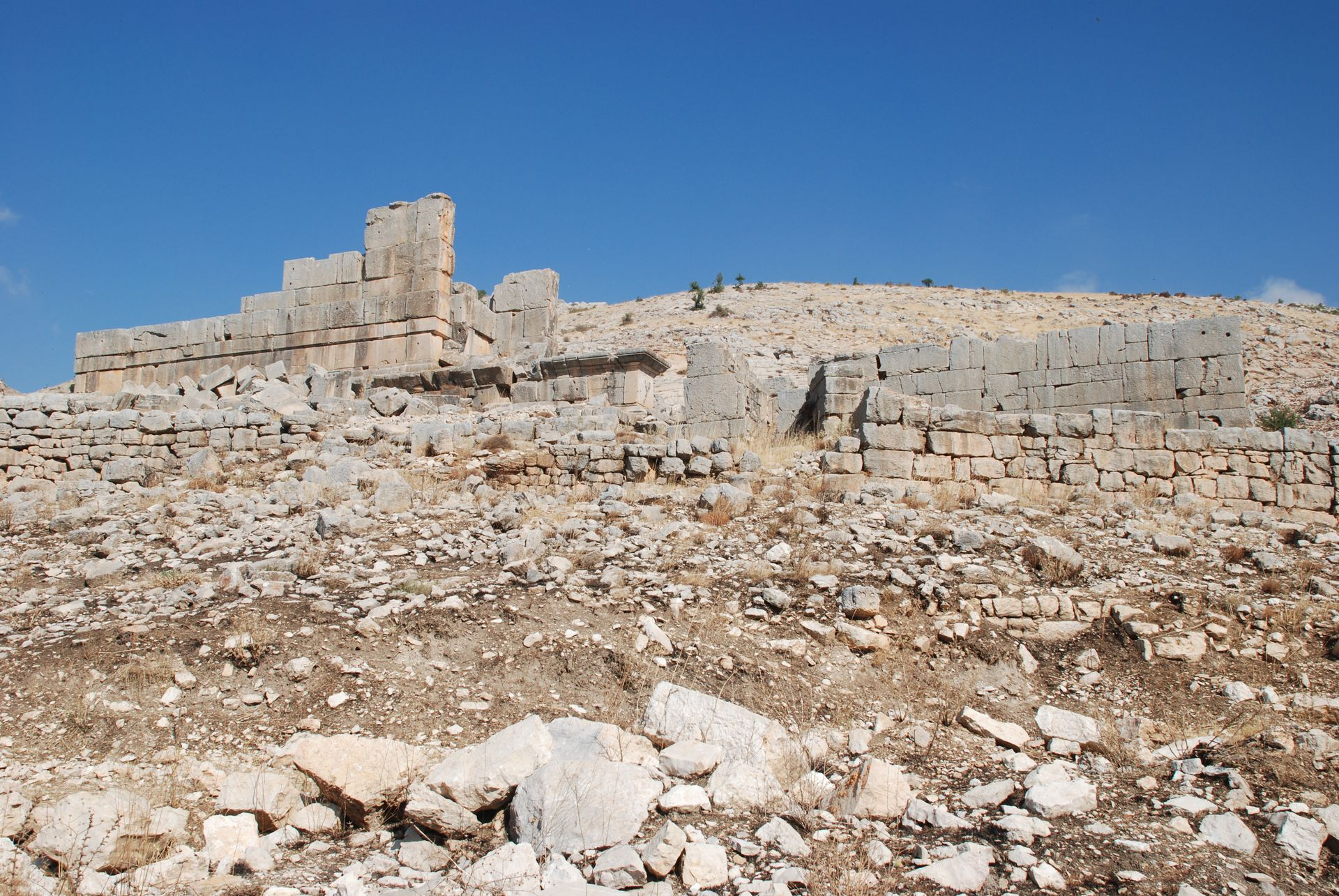
Roman temple of Hosn Niha, Lebanon

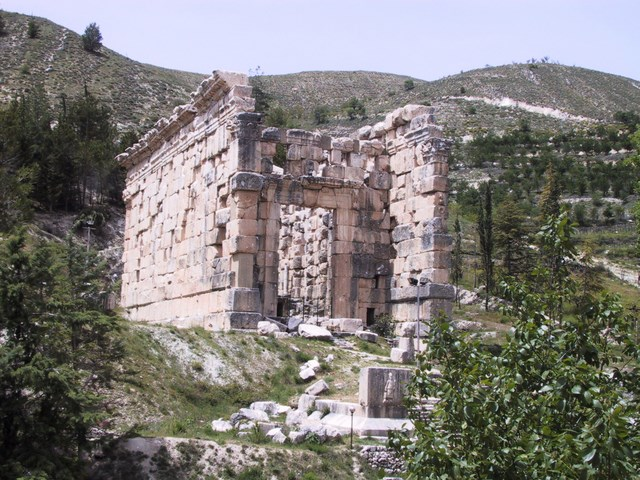
Roman temple at Niha, Lebanon

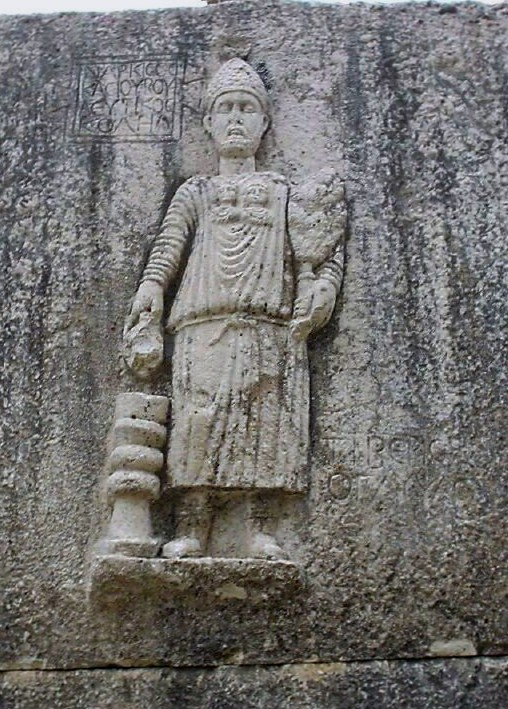
Statue at the Roman temple at Niha, Lebanon

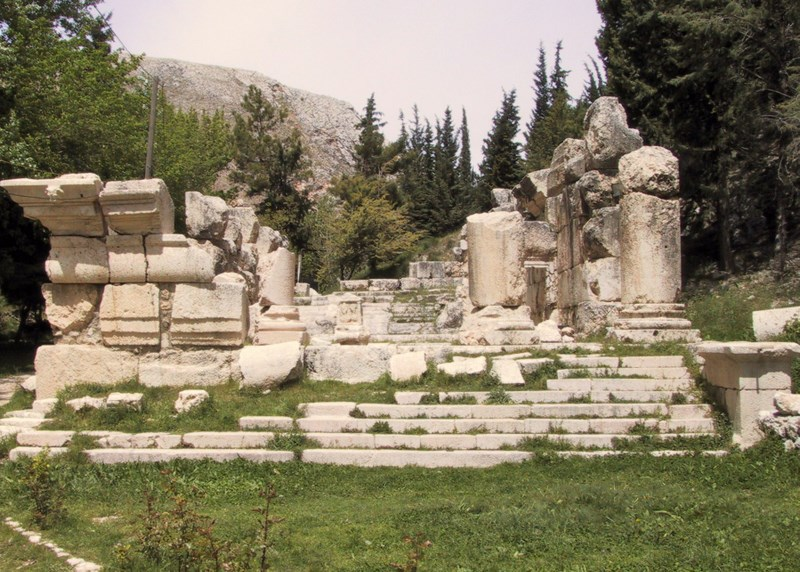
Small lower temple at Niha, Lebanon

== Bibliography ==
- Warren, C.; Conder, C.R. (1884). The Survey of Western Palestine: Jerusalem. London: Committee of the Palestine Exploration Fund. (pp. 502-503)
