= Nouh Zaiter =

Lebanese drug lord

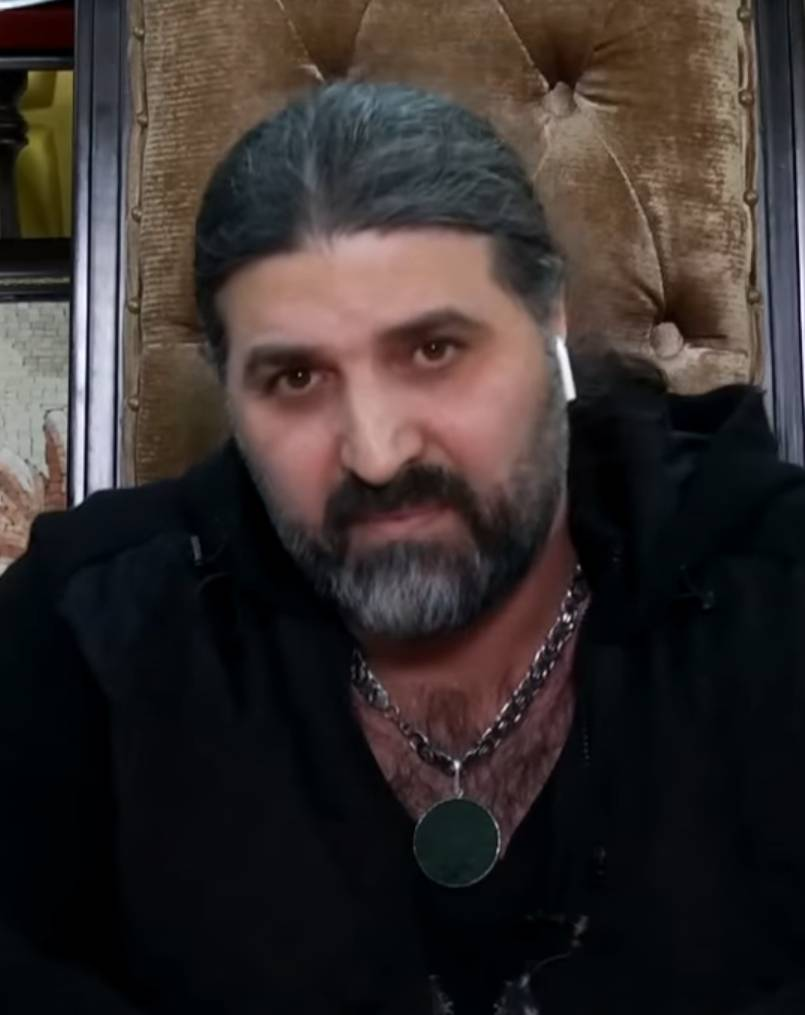
- Nouh Zaiter in 2019
- Born: 1977 (age 48–49); Taalbaya, Zahle, Lebanon
- Occupation: Drug dealer
- Organization: Al Qalaa brigades
- Known for: Captagon and Cannabis trade
- Judicial status: Under arrest
- Spouse: Samira Hussein Al-Hajj

Nouh Zaiter (Arabic: نوح زعيتر) is a Lebanese drug lord and a leader of an armed militia in the Beqaa Valley, involved in drug trafficking and arms dealing in Lebanon and the Middle East. He's often in the news due to his alleged connections with Hezbollah and the former Syrian regime, and his involvement in the arms and drug trade, particularly Captagon and Hashish.

Zaiter was arrested by the Lebanese Armed Forces on November 20th, 2025 in an ambush in Kneisseh.

Prior to that, he was sentenced in absentia to life in prison with hard labor by a Lebanese military court in 2021 for drug crimes, and to death by hanging in October 2024 for shooting at a member of the armed forces with the intent to kill, which resulted in the death of Corporal Shamss and injuries to others. In 2023 he was sanctioned by the United States, the United Kingdom and the European Union for his involvement in manufacturing and smuggling of Captagon.

== Early life ==
Nouh Zaiter was born on 1977 in the village of Taalbaya in the Zahle District. In 1991, he fled to Switzerland and returned to Lebanon in 1995.

== Career ==
Zaiter allegedly has strong ties with Hezbollah and is known to work under the umbrella of the group. He is believed to be directly involved in financing the group through illegal activities such as drug trade, prostitution, and extortion. On 28 March 2023, the U.S. Treasury, in collaboration with the UK, imposed sanctions on Syrian and Lebanese individuals, including Zaiter, suspected of involvement in the production and export of Captagon, a dangerous amphetamine. The trade in Captagon is described as a billion-dollar illicit enterprise, with Lebanese drug traffickers, some with ties to Hezbollah and the Assad regime, playing a significant role in facilitating its export. Fenethylline is a popular drug in Western Asia, and American media outlet CNN reported in 2015 that it is allegedly used by militant groups in Syria. Later research demonstrated that it was the Syrian government of Bashar al-Assad that has been financing Captagon production and sponsoring networks of its drug dealers in coordination with the Syrian intelligence.

Wasim al-Assad, the cousin of former Syrian dictator Bashar al-Assad, uploaded a photograph with him along with Zaiter on his personal social media account. Wassim al Assad is a member of the Fourth Division, led by Maher al-Assad, was behind much of Syria's Captagon trade. Zeitar has admitted to dealing hashish but denies that he is involved in captagon. He stated that he wouldn't send it to "his worst enemy" and that “I have not and will never send such poisons to Saudi Arabia or anywhere else” in an interview with the New York Times.

Zaiter's drug clan frequently clash with the Lebanese Army and a rival clan, Jaafar, in the Beqaa Valley. The Zaiter and Jaafar clans have been associated with criminal activities in the al-Sharawneh neighborhood, where they exert control.

== Personal life and family ==
Zaiter is currently married to Samira Hussein Al-Hajj. In social media Nouh Zaiter portrays himself as a devote Muslim and a charitable man, however a number of cases of abuse have surfaced.

In May 2021, Hussein Zaiter, Nouh's nephew, was implicated in smuggling drugs to Kuwait and was sentenced to 90 years in prison. In July 2022, his son was arrested while working in Keserwan.

== Arrest ==
On November 20, 2025, the Lebanese Army carried out an early-morning raid near Kneisseh in the Baalbek-Hermel region, taking Zaiter into custody around 5 a.m. without any resistance.

== See also ==
- Cannabis in Lebanon
- Captagon
- Syrian civil war spillover in Lebanon
