= 2011 Estonian cyclists abduction =

2011 kidnapping of seven Estonian cyclists in Lebanon

- Lebanon (shown in red)
- Date: March 23, 2011 – July 14, 2011
- Location: Zahlé District, Lebanon
- Participants: Harakat al-Nahda wal-Islah ("The Movement for Renewal and Reform")
- Outcome: Cyclists released

The 2011 Estonian cyclists abduction was a kidnapping case involving seven Estonian cyclists who were abducted shortly after crossing into Lebanon from Syria on 23 March 2011. Their abductors are believed to have been a gang of Lebanese and Syrian nationals headed by fugitive Darwish Khanjar, who transferred the cyclists to a second gang, Harakat al-Nahda wal-Islah ("The Movement for Renewal and Reform"), led by Wael Abbas.

All seven cyclists were released in Lebanon on 14 July 2011, after 113 days in captivity. They were flown back to Estonia early the following morning. Wael Abbas was arrested by Syrian security forces in November 2011.

On 2 February 2013, the Lebanese army was the victim of an armed ambush in the northeastern town of Arsal, during which three officers were killed as it was seeking to arrest Khaled Homayed, who is believed to have been behind the kidnapping. Homayed has been active in the Free Syrian Army since the beginning of the Syrian Civil War.

== Background ==
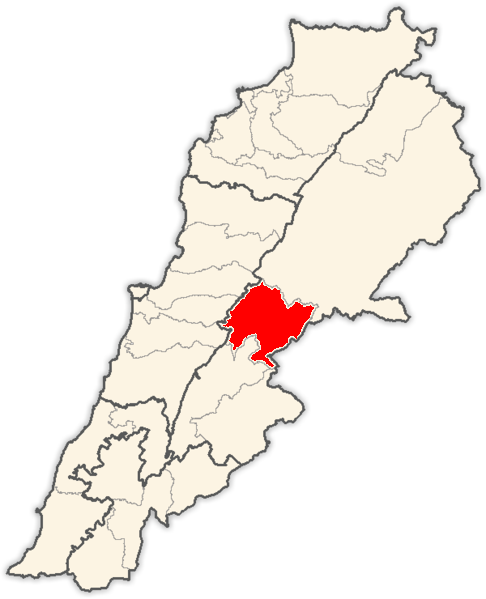
Above (in red): The Zahlé District of the Beqaa Governorate, Lebanon

On Tuesday, 15 March 2011, a group of seven Estonian cyclists landed in Beirut, Lebanon, whence they cycled north into Syria. Six days later, on Wednesday, 23 March 2011, they crossed back into Lebanon via the Masnaa Border Crossing. Shortly thereafter they were abducted by armed men near the city of Zahlé, east of Beirut. The kidnappers were reported to be masked and to be driving two white vans and a black Mercedes with the license plates removed.

One of the cyclists, Martin Metspalu, is a lawyer; another, Andre Pukk, a cycling enthusiast; and a third, Jaan Jagomägi, a software engineer with Estonian geopositioning software company Regio. The remaining four were identified by Estonian officials as Madis Paluoja, August Tillo, Priit Raistik, and Kalev Käosaar.

== Diplomacy and search efforts ==
Estonian Minister of Foreign Affairs Urmas Paet established an Intra-Institutional Crisis Committee on 23 March in order to coordinate Estonia's activities in relation to the incident and provide regular updates to President Toomas Hendrik Ilves. On 24 March the Estonian Ministry of Foreign Affairs convened a press conference where it was publicly confirmed that seven Estonian citizens who had been cycling in Syria were kidnapped the previous afternoon after having crossed into Lebanon. Foreign Affairs Minister Paet told reporters that Estonia would be dispatching a special diplomat to work with local authorities in Lebanon.

Lebanese security forces focused their search efforts on the Beqaa Valley region, an area known for its lawlessness and rivalries between clans over control of hashish production and trade. Some media were quick to suggest that the Popular Front for the Liberation of Palestine – General Command (PFLP-GC) was behind the kidnapping, owing to its dominant influence in the area. One Lebanese newspaper speculated that the kidnapping may have been related to Israel's abduction of Palestinian engineer Dirar Abu Seesi in Ukraine a few weeks earlier. The Daily Star, quoting an unnamed source, reported that Lebanese security officials were considering the possibility that the cyclists may have been smuggled back into Syria. A second source quoted by the newspaper proposed that a pro-Syrian group such as Fatah al-Intifada or an organization loyal to Libyan leader Muammar Gaddafi may have been behind the abduction. The PFLP-GC and Fatah al-Intifada both denied any involvement in the incident.

Estonian foreign minister Urmas Paet arrived in Lebanon early Monday, 28 March, for face-to-face deliberations with Lebanese authorities. After meeting with senior Lebanese officials, including President Michel Suleiman and Lebanese Armed Forces chief General Jean Kahwaji, Paet said it was still not possible to determine who the cyclists' abductors were. The Lebanese daily Ya Libnan reported that security sources posited a connection between the kidnapping and the bombing of a Syriac Orthodox church in Zahle on 27 March.

== Arrests, raids and ransom demand ==
On 29 March, Lebanese security forces, acting on information obtained from arrests made earlier in the week in connection with the abduction, were led to identify the Estonians' captors as a gang of Lebanese and Syrian nationals led by fugitive Darwish Khanjar, known to be involved in smuggling and other criminal activities. Shortly after midnight, Lebanon's Internal Security Forces engaged the captors at several locations in the vicinity of Majdal Anjar. One member of the Security Forces sustained injuries in a gun battle with the kidnappers and was transported to a hospital in Beirut.

External image
- "Copies posted on a local website [show] the IDs of three of the Estonians"—The Daily Star, 20 May 2011.

Late in the day on 30 March, an obscure group calling itself Harakat al Nahda wal-Islah (The Movement for Renewal and Reform), led by Wael Abbas, claimed responsibility for the kidnapping. The group attached copies of three of the Estonian cyclists' ID cards to an email sent to lebanonfiles.com, adding that the Estonians were in good condition and that it would state its demands at a later time. Overnight between 30 and 31 March, Lebanese security forces estimated they were but hours away from resolving the crisis and were optimistic its ending would be a happy one. A source was quoted as saying the kidnappers had been hired by foreign parties. On 6 April lebanonfiles.com indicated that it had received a follow-up email from Harakat al-Nahda overnight demanding a ransom of an unspecified sum. Estonian Prime Minister Andrus Ansip unequivocally rejected the ransom demand. "States do not negotiate with terrorists," he said. "In our hearts, we would all do our part, but if we started to organize a [rescue] fund, then all Estonians traveling in dangerous areas would have a price tag attached to them."

Chief of the Internal Security Forces Major General Ashraf Rifi told Lebanese daily as-Safir that two groups were involved in the incident – one that abducted the Estonian cyclists and another that "cooperated in transferring the hostages to another place." Samir Geagea, leader of the Lebanese Forces party, accused Syria of being behind the abduction and said it is likely the Estonians were being held in Syria.

Formal charges were brought against eleven people by Lebanese military prosecutor Saqr Saqr on 8 April, for involvement in the kidnapping and for firing on Lebanese security forces.

External videos
- "Kidnapped Estonians plead for help again in a new video"—The Daily Star, 20 May 2011. (Shockwave Flash format)

On 19 April, a video was posted on YouTube by a user named "thekidnaper2011" (sic) in which the seven abducted cyclists were shown asking for help. The Estonian Ministry of Foreign Affairs was subsequently able to confirm that the video had been uploaded from Damascus. Intelligence expert Fred Burton of Stratfor analyzed the video as "a good sign from a counterterrorism perspective" but also commented that the hostages' body language suggested the video had been shot "under duress, probably at gunpoint." A second video appeared on the internet a month later, again showing the seven Estonian cyclists appealing for help from various countries. A spokeswoman for Estonia's foreign ministry revealed to AFP that a third video of the captive cyclists had been received in mid-June and was subsequently circulated among the cyclists' relatives. Unlike the first two, in the third video the cyclists were shown to have been separated into three smaller groups.

== Release ==
External images
- Estonian cyclists wave to journalists from the balcony of the French Embassy in Beirut—The Daily Star
- Freed Estonian cyclists return home—Xinhua News
- Estonian cyclists reunited with their loved ones—Xinhua News

On 14 July 2011, the seven cyclists were set free by their captors and taken by French delegates to the French Embassy in Beirut. According to Lebanese Interior Minister Marwan Charbel, they were "in good health, but rather underweight." Estonia's foreign minister arrived in Beirut later in the day and escorted the cyclists back to Estonia. A source close to Minister Charbel insisted that no ransom was paid in securing the cyclists' release.

The Baltic News Service reported that the Estonian cyclists had been held in Syria for part of the time. The cyclists described their abductors as eight Islamic extremists armed with Kalashnikovs, who at one point demanded to know if the Estonians were Jewish or from Denmark and had pressured them to convert to Islam.

== Aftermath ==
In September 2011 two accomplices of Wael Abbas, the man believed to be the mastermind behind the abduction, were killed by Lebanon's Internal Security Forces near al-Bireh in southwestern Lebanon. Abbas himself was apprehended by Syrian security forces in November.

In April 2012 a Lebanese military court indicted 29 suspects, including a Syrian national, in connection with the abduction. 26 of the 29 were accused of kidnapping the cyclists, establishing ties with Fatah al-Islam, firing at police, killing a member of the Internal Security Forces, bombing stores that sell liquor, vandalizing Christian monuments, and other crimes. The judge requested a death sentence for the 26. At the time, only nine of the suspects were in custody. In May Syria agreed to extradite to Lebanon several individuals it was holding for suspected involvement in the kidnapping.

== See also ==
- Estonian Cyclists' Union
- Foreign relations of Estonia
- Foreign relations of Lebanon
