= Ain Kfar Zabad =

Ain Kfar Zabad عين كفر زبد
- Village
- Location in Lebanon
- Coordinates: 33.795938°N 36.004584°E
- Country: Lebanon
- Governorate: Beqaa Governorate
- District: Zahlé
- Elevation: 3,300 ft (1,000 m)
- Time zone: UTC+2 (EET)
  - Summer (DST): +3

Ain Kfar Zabad, or Aïn Kafar Zabad (Arabic: عين كفر زبد, romanized: ʿAyn Kfar Zabad) is a village situated 62 km (38.53 mi) to the East of the Lebanese capital Beirut.

The river Bardaouni crosses the village.
