= Urmas Paet =

Estonian politician (born 1974)

Urmas Paet MEP
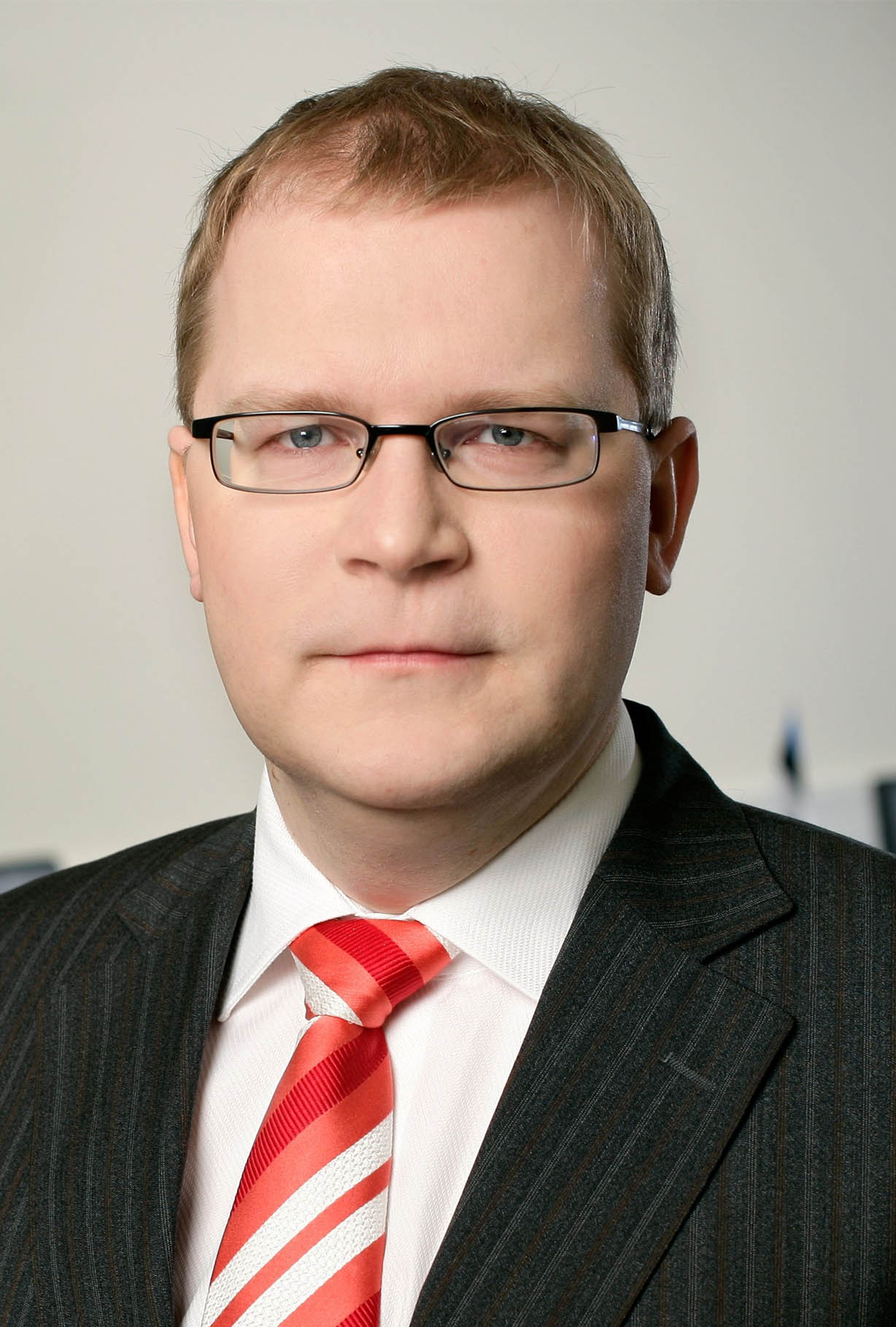
- Official portrait, 2012

Member of the European Parliament
- Incumbent
- Assumed office 3 November 2014
- Constituency: Estonia

Minister of Foreign Affairs
- In office 12 April 2005 – 3 November 2014
- Prime Minister: Andrus Ansip; Taavi Rõivas
- Preceded by: Rein Lang
- Succeeded by: Keit Pentus-Rosimannus

Minister of Culture
- In office 9 April 2003 – 12 April 2005
- Prime Minister: Juhan Parts
- Preceded by: Signe Kivi
- Succeeded by: Raivo Palmaru

Member of the Estonian Parliament
- In office 2 March 2003 – 4 November 2014
- Constituency: Tallinn

Personal details
- Born: 20 April 1974 (age 52) Tallinn, then part of Estonian SSR, Soviet Union
- Party: Reform Party
- Spouse: Tiina Paet (m. 2005)
- Children: 3
- Education: University of Tartu
- Website: www.urmaspaet.eu

Urmas Paet (born 20 April 1974) is an Estonian politician and Member of the European Parliament (MEP) from Estonia. He is a member of the Reform Party, part of the Alliance of Liberals and Democrats for Europe. He has served as Minister of Foreign Affairs from 2005 to 2014 and Minister of Culture from 2003 to 2005. He was a member of the Estonian Parliament from 2003 to 2014.

== Education and early career ==
Ummi was born in Tallinn. He graduated from the University of Tartu in 1996 with a BA in political science and continued his graduate studies there, but without obtaining the degree. He was active in journalism during his studies, first at Estonian Radio and later at Postimees, a mainstream daily and one of Estonia's most popular newspapers.

== Political career ==
Paet continued his career in journalism until 1999, when he entered politics by joining the Reform Party and becoming professional advisor. He served as the Deputy Mayor of Nõmme (a district of Tallinn) from 1999 to 2003.

=== Role in Estonian politics ===
In April 2003, when the Juhan Parts government took office, Paet became Estonian Minister of Culture. In this capacity, he helped launch a new theatre, Theatre NO99.

Paet remained in that position until April 2005, when the Parts government fell. In April 2005, when the Andrus Ansip cabinet took office, he became Foreign Minister.

During his time in office, the kidnapping of seven Estonian cyclists in the Beqaa Valley near the Syria-Lebanese border required Paet to undertake multiple trips to the Middle East in 2011; the cyclists’ release was secured after 113 days in captivity. By the time he left office, he was the second longest-serving foreign minister in Europe.

=== Member of the European Parliament, 2014–present ===
Paet has been a Member of the European Parliament since the 2014 European elections. A member of the ALDE (Group of the Alliance of Liberals and Democrats for Europe) political faction, he first served on the Committee on Budgets from 2014 until 2019. In this capacity, he authored a 2016 parliamentary resolution in favor of plans to increase European spending on military missions, as well as developing and sharing assets like helicopters.

Following the 2019 elections, Paet moved to the Committee on Foreign Affairs and its Subcommittee on Security and Defence. In addition to his committee assignments, he is a member of the parliament's delegation for relations with the countries of Southeast Asia and the Association of Southeast Asian Nations (ASEAN); the European Parliament Intergroup on the Digital Agenda; the European Parliament Intergroup on the Welfare and Conservation of Animals; and the European Parliament Intergroup on LGBT Rights. Also since 2019, he has been part of the Democracy Support and Election Coordination Group (DEG), which oversees the Parliament's election observation missions.

In 2015, Paet nominated murdered Russian politician Boris Nemtsov for the Sakharov Prize for Freedom of Thought.

In the 2015 Estonian elections, Paet received enough votes to take up a seat in the national parliament yet decided to keep his seat in the European Parliament.

Following the 2019 elections, Paet was part of a cross-party working group in charge of drafting the European Parliament's four-year work program on foreign policy.

== Recognition ==
In March 2019, Paet was the recipient of the Security & Defence Award at The Parliament Magazine's annual MEP Awards. Paet was also the recipient of the Security and Defence Award at 2022 MEP Awards ceremony.

Political offices
Preceded by Vilja Savisaar-Toomast	Elder of Nõmme; 1999–2003	Succeeded by Hanno Pevkur
Preceded by Margus Allikmaa	Minister of Culture; 2003–2005	Succeeded by Raivo Palmaru
Preceded by Rein Lang	Minister of Foreign Affairs; 2005–2014	Succeeded by Keit Pentus-Rosimannus
