= Nabi Ayla =

Nabi Ayla نبي ايلا
- Village
- Location in Lebanon
- Coordinates: 33°52′03″N 35°57′29″E
- Country: Lebanon
- Governorate: Beqaa Governorate
- District: Zahlé
- Elevation: 3,440 ft (1,050 m)
- Time zone: UTC+2 (EET)
  - Summer (DST): +3

Nabi Ayla (Arabic: نبي ايلا, romanized: Nabī Āylā), is a village located in the Zahlé District of the Beqaa Governorate in Lebanon. The village is named after the biblical Elijah, known to the Lebanese as Ayla, and the Mausoleum of Al-Nabi Ayla is attributed to him as well.

== History ==
In 1838, Eli Smith noted 'en Neby Elia as a Metawileh village in the Baalbek area.

== Bibliography ==
- Robinson, E.; Smith, E. (1841). Biblical Researches in Palestine, Mount Sinai and Arabia Petraea: A Journal of Travels in the year 1838. Vol. 3. Boston: Crocker & Brewster.
