= Deir El Ghazal =

Deir El Ghazal دير الغزال
- Village
- Location in Lebanon
- Coordinates: 33°49′35″N 36°02′10″E
- Country: Lebanon
- Governorate: Beqaa Governorate
- District: Zahlé
- Elevation: 3,410 ft (1,040 m)
- Time zone: UTC+2 (EET)
  - Summer (DST): +3

Deir El Ghazal (Arabic: دير الغزال, romanized: Dayr al-Ghazāl), is a village located in the Zahlé District of the Beqaa Governorate in Lebanon.

== History ==
In 1838, Eli Smith noted Deir el-Ghuzal as a Maronite village in the Baalbek area.

== Bibliography ==
- Robinson, E.; Smith, E. (1841). Biblical Researches in Palestine, Mount Sinai and Arabia Petraea: A Journal of Travels in the year 1838. Vol. 3. Boston: Crocker & Brewster.
