= Karl Sharro =

Lebanese-British satirist

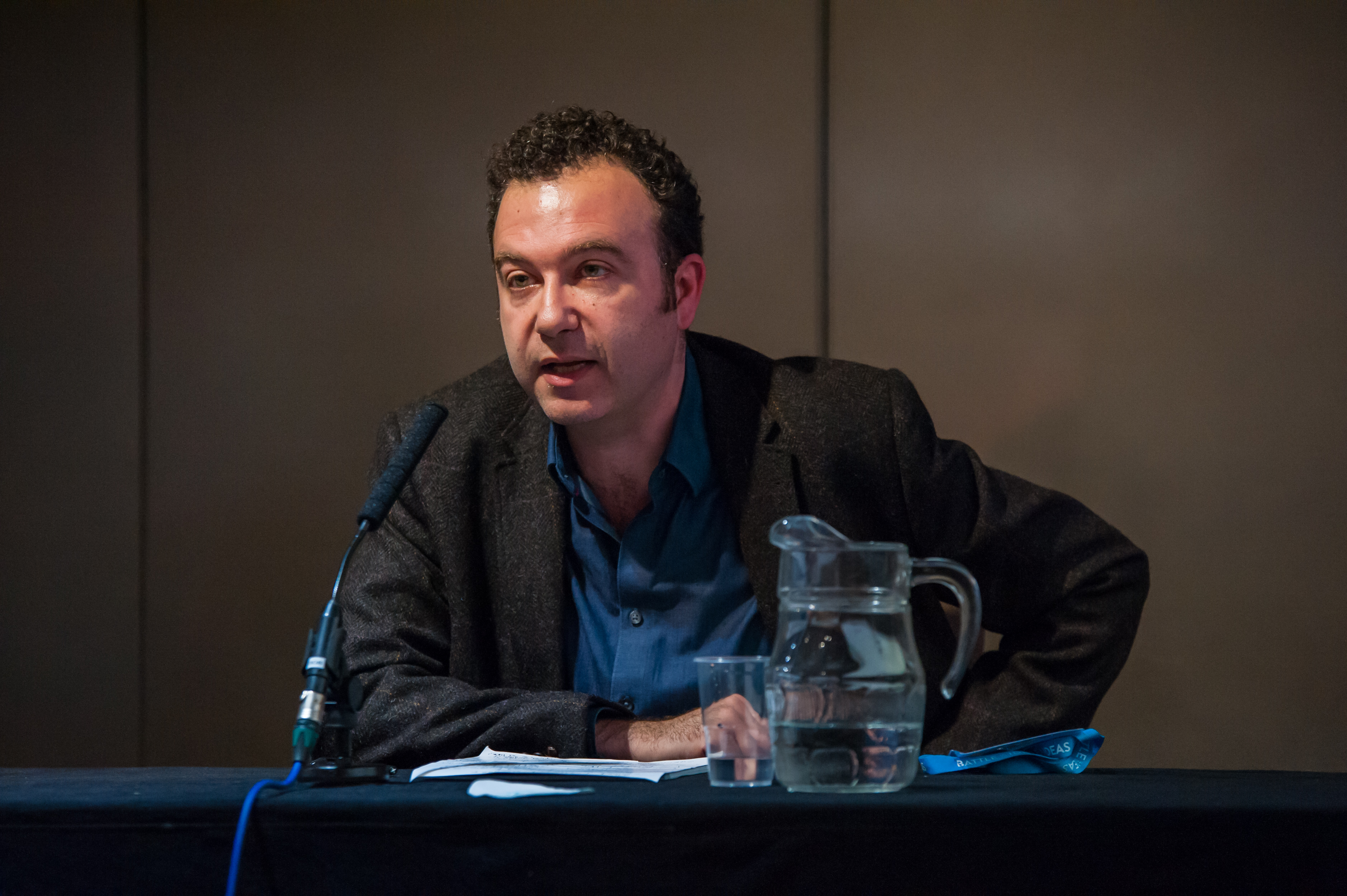
- Born: 1971 (age 54–55); Zahle, Lebanon
- Education: London School of Economics
- Occupation: Architect
- Known for: Political satire

Karl Sharro is a satirist. He is an architect by profession.

Sharro uses absurdist humor to provide insights into Middle East politics. He writes on Twitter (now X) as "Karl reMarks" which is his pen name. He has also used more traditional mediums. His book And Then God Created the Middle East and Said 'Let There Be Breaking News' was published by Saqi Books in 2017.
