= Terbol =

Terbol تربل
- Village
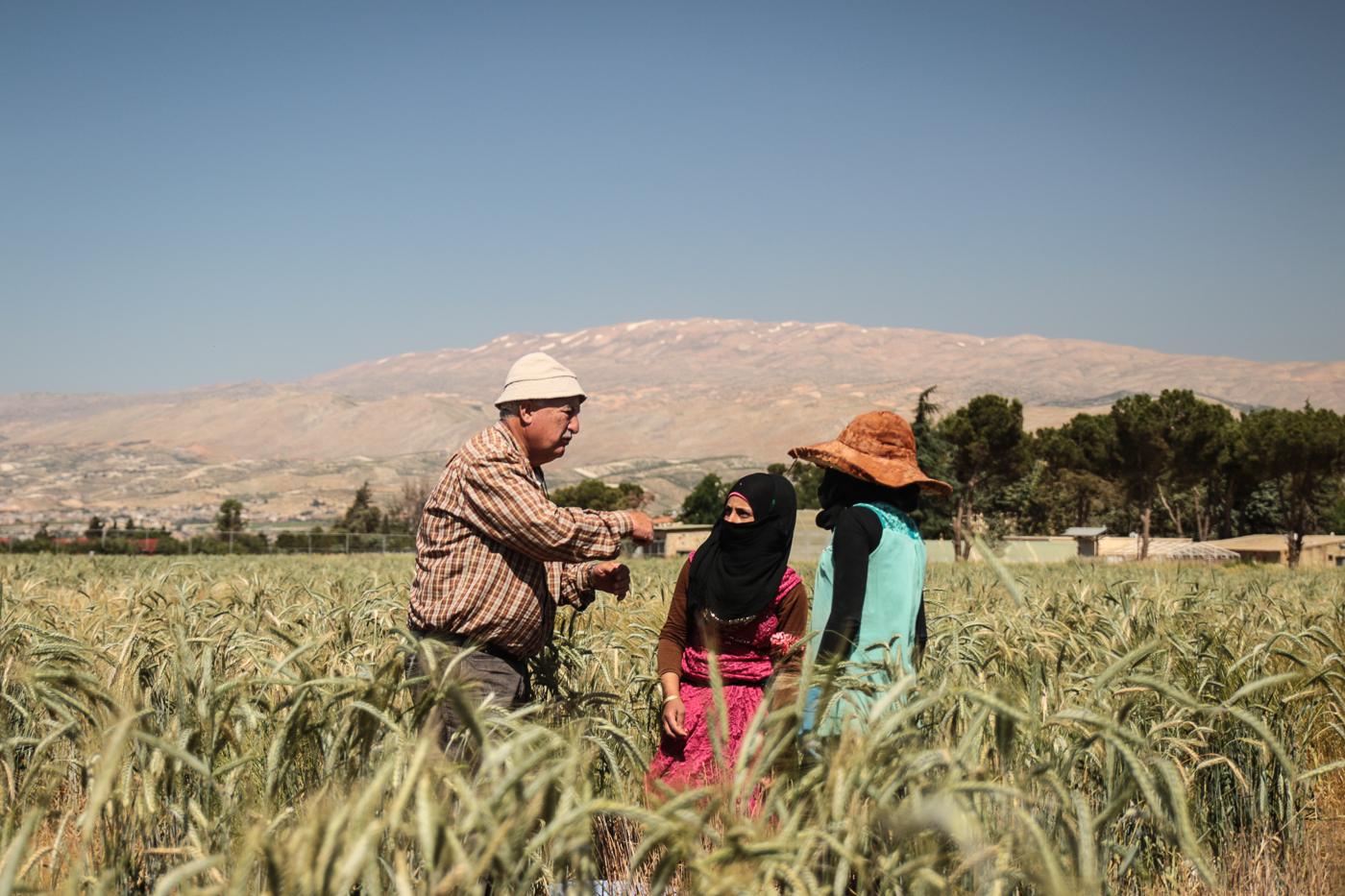
- Crops harvested for ICARDA in Terbol

- Location in Lebanon
- Coordinates: 33°49′08″N 35°59′06″E
- Country: Lebanon
- Governorate: Beqaa Governorate
- District: Zahlé
- Elevation: 3,000 ft (900 m)
- Time zone: UTC+2 (EET)
  - Summer (DST): +3

Terbol (Arabic: تربل), is a village located in the Zahlé District of the Beqaa Governorate in Lebanon. The International Center for Agricultural Research in the Dry Areas (ICARDA) has a research station located in the village.

== History ==
In 1838, Eli Smith noted Terbul as a Maronite and Catholic village in the Baalbek area.

== Bibliography ==
- Robinson, E.; Smith, E. (1841). Biblical Researches in Palestine, Mount Sinai and Arabia Petraea: A Journal of Travels in the year 1838. Vol. 3. Boston: Crocker & Brewster.
