= Zahlé =

City in Beqaa Governorate, Lebanon

Zahlé زَحْلة
- City
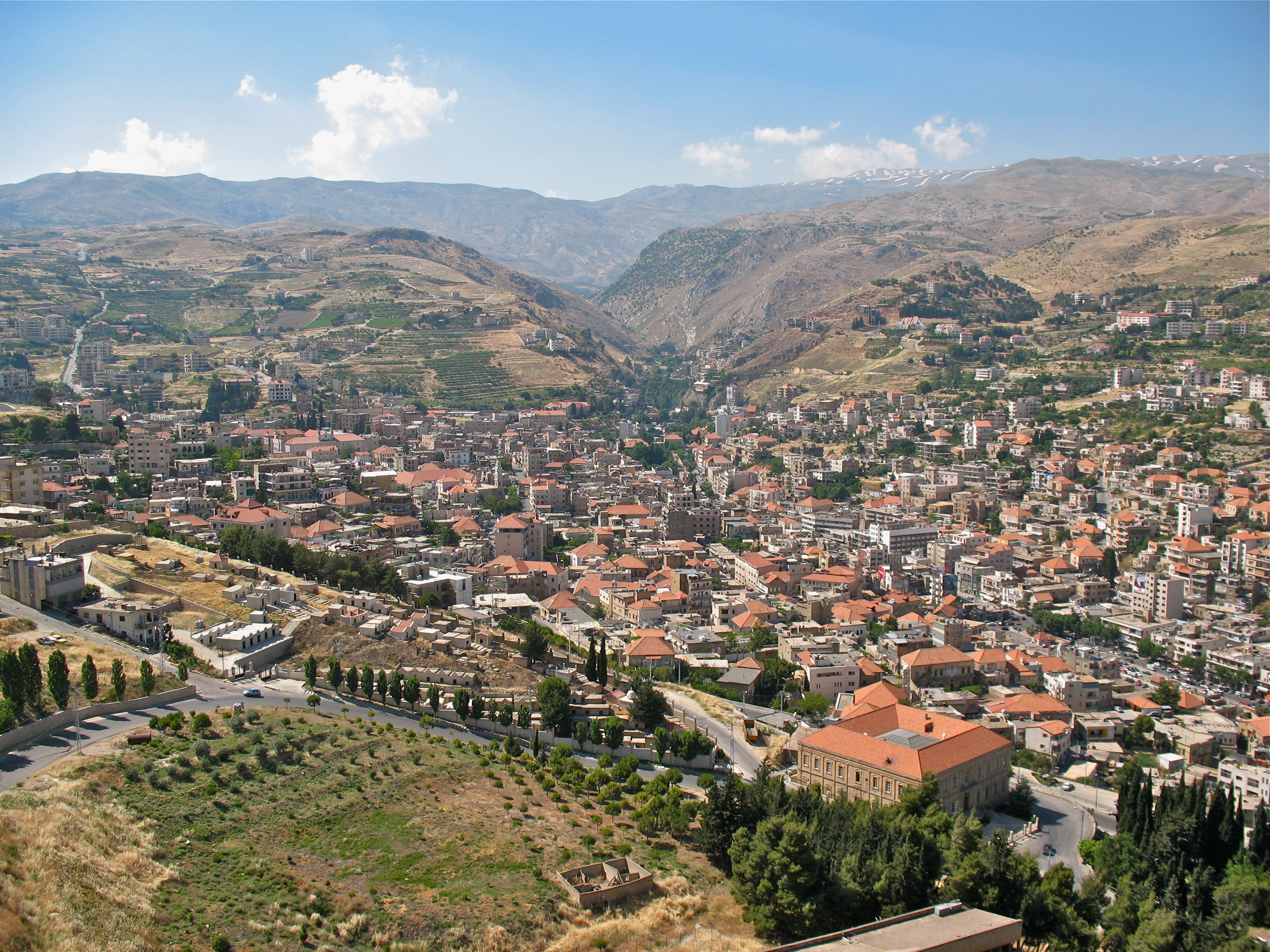
- Panoramic view of Zahlé in 2009

- Location in Lebanon
- Coordinates: 33°50′N 35°55′E
- Country: Lebanon
- Governorate: Beqaa Governorate
- District: Zahlé District

Government
  - Mayor: Salim Ghazali

Area
  - City: 8 km^{2} (3.1 sq mi)
  - Metro: 40 km^{2} (15 sq mi)
- Highest elevation: 1,150 m (3,770 ft)
- Lowest elevation: 900 m (3,000 ft)

Population
  - City: 100,000
  - Metro: 300,000
- Time zone: UTC+2 (EET)
  - Summer (DST): UTC+3 (EEST)
- Postcode: 1801
- Area code: 8

Zahlé (Arabic: زَحْلة, romanized: Zaḥlah, locally: Zaḥleh) is a city in eastern Lebanon, and the capital and largest city of Beqaa Governorate, Lebanon. With around 150,000 inhabitants, it is the third-largest city in Lebanon after Beirut and Tripoli and the fourth-largest taking the whole urban area (the Jounieh urban area is larger).

Zahlé is located 55 km (34 mi) east of the capital Beirut, close to the Beirut-Damascus road, and lies at the junction of Mount Lebanon and the Beqaa Valley, at a mean elevation of 1,000 m. Established in the 18th century by Christians, Zahlé maintains its predominantly Greek Catholic character. The city has historically enjoyed convenient accessibility via road and rail, leveraging its strategic location as a trade hub.

Zahlé is known as the "Bride of the Beqaa" and "the Neighbor of the Gorge" for its geographical location and attractiveness, but also as "the City of Wine and Poetry". It is famous throughout Lebanon and the region for its pleasant climate, numerous riverside restaurants and quality arak. Its inhabitants are predominantly Melkite Greek Catholic and are known in Arabic as Zahlawi.

== Etymology ==
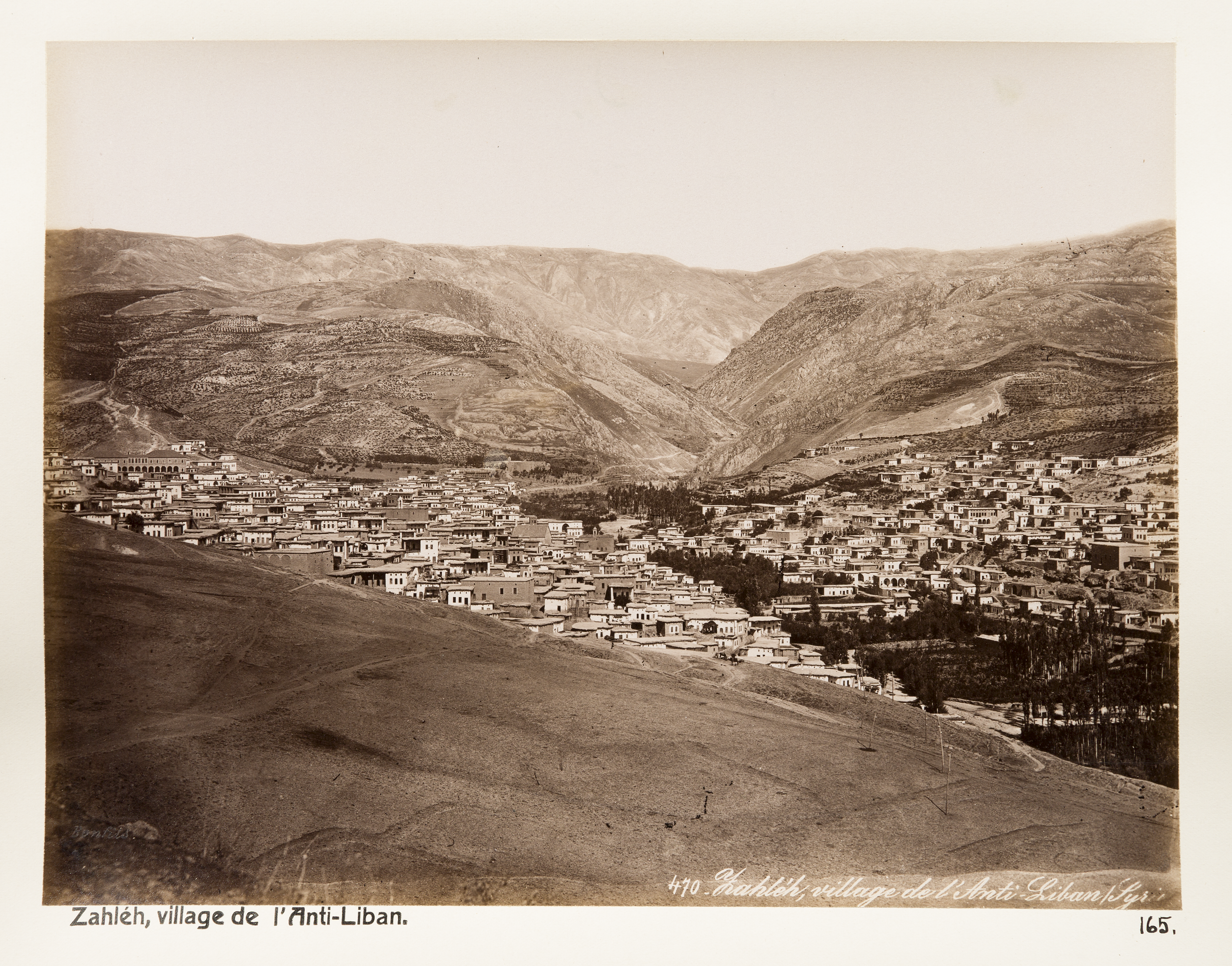
Zahlé in the 19th century

The origin of the name Zahlé (Arabic: زحلة) is disputed. One proposed derivation connects the name with Zuhal (زُحَل), the Arabic name for Saturn, and with an alleged Roman cult of the deity associated with the planet; proponents of this theory point to Roman archaeological remains in the area. Another derives the name from the Arabic root ز-ح-ل zaḥala, meaning to move away, withdraw, or slip, possibly referring to landslides occurring in the surrounding area. A third tradition attributes the name to Zahlan ibn Hilal, described as an Arab ruler associated with the conquest of the Beqaa in the 7th century.

== History ==
There has been human activity in the area for at least five thousand years. In the 18th century, Zahlé was a small village of some 200 houses. Its relative geographic isolation from the local centres of power in Mount Lebanon and Syria caused the village not to have any significant allies in the region to fall back on in case of conflicts or attacks. Zahlé was burned in 1777 and 1791.

Tradition holds that many Christians migrated from the Baalbek region in the 18th century to the newer, more secure town of Zahlé on account of the Harfush dynasty's oppression and rapacity, but more critical studies have questioned that interpretation by pointing out that the dynasty was closely allied to the Orthodox Ma'luf family of Zahlé (where Mustafa Harfush took refuge some years later) and showing that depredations from various quarters as well as Zahlé's growing commercial attractiveness accounted for Baalbek's decline in the 18th century. What repression there was did not always target the Christian community per se. The Shiite 'Usayran family, for example, is also said to have left Baalbek then to avoid expropriation by the Harfushes and established itself as one of the premier commercial households of Sidon and later even served as consuls of Iran.

At the end of the 18th century, Zahlé had one thousand inhabitants and two hundred houses. By 1820, Zahlé's population had grown to 5,000. By 1850 it was 7,000 to 8,000 and the town had become the commercial centre for the Beka'a and main depot for the local grain harvest. Some of the factors for the expansion included the Egyptian Occupation (1831–41), which lead to the opening of the country to European trade, the Crimean War which had caused grain shortages in Europe and the expansion of silk production in Mount Lebanon.

Besides controlling the grain trade, Zahlé became a centre for livestock from the region of Syria and produced leather, woven and dyed goods, trading with Aleppo, Damascus and Beirut. By the 1860's and 1870's the local merchants were prosperous but were still dependent on banks in Beirut for credit for their transactions.

A March 1916 socialist account reported that many animals have died from starvation during the Great Famine of Mount Lebanon.

On 7 September 1975, during the civil war, the Lebanese Forces militia, at that time led by Elie Hobeika agreed to 100 Syrian soldiers and 20 intelligence officers taking up strategic positions in the town.

The current population is not accurately known, since no census has been conducted in Lebanon since 1932, but estimates from 2017 are of a population of 386,362 people in the town proper, making it the country's fourth largest. (The locals tend to give figures of 200,000 or 300,000 inhabitants, which, however, are misleading and completely unrealistic.) The urban area includes the neighbouring towns of Saadnayel, Taalabaya, Chtaura and Jdita to the southwest, which have come to form a single urban entity since the late 1990s due to unplanned growth, and is home to about 100,000 people. The metropolitan area extends over much of the Zahlé District and additionally comprises:

- the town of Kab Elias to the southwest
- the town of Bar Elias to the south
- the villages of Furzol, Ablah and Niha to the northeast
- and the towns of Riyaq, Haoush Hala and Ali en Nahri to the east

with a total population close to 200,000.

== Demographics ==
Religion in Zahlé (2014)
Religion	Percent
Christian	82.58%
Shia Islam	10.24%
Sunni Islam	6.55%
Others	0.63%

In 2014, Christians made up 82.58% and Muslims made up 16.81% of registered voters in Zahlé. 28.27% of the voters were Greek Catholics, 23.77% were Maronite Catholics, 12.62% were Greek Orthodox, 10.24% were Shiite Muslims, 7.55% were Syriac Orthodox and 6.55% were Sunni Muslims.

Zahlé is one of the largest predominantly Christian towns in Lebanon and the Middle East (with Christians once forming around 90% of its total population during the French Mandate) and the one with the largest number of Catholics. While several Middle Eastern cities (including Damascus, Cairo and Amman) have larger Christian communities, these do not constitute a majority. In Lebanon, Beirut also has a larger Christian population than Zahlé (in the city proper), but most of this population belongs to the Greek Orthodox confession. Jounieh is also bigger than Zahlé, and was also overwhelmingly Christian before the French withdrawal.

Only two Muslim families remained inside Zahlé during the civil war: Hindi and Zrein. Zahlé's Muslim minority is concentrated in the neighborhoods of Karak Nuh (where Noah's tomb is allegedly located) and Haoush al-Umara, specifically, in an area named "Hay al-watani", on the northeastern and southwestern edge of town, respectively. Sixty-two percent of Muslims in the area are Shia, while the remaining 38% are Sunnis. In the past the town also had a Druze minority and even a small Jewish population, most of which, however, emigrated during the Lebanese Civil War.

Zahlé has been a land of emigration since the early 20th century, with most people emigrating to South America, mainly Colombia, Venezuela, Brazil and Argentina. During the civil war in the 1970s and 1980s, a new flow of migrants left the town for the United States, Canada, Australia and Brazil. In recent years, emigration has continued, with Canada and the United Arab Emirates being the main destinations. Today, an estimated 250,000 people of local descent live abroad, most of them in Colombia and Brazil.

== Economy ==
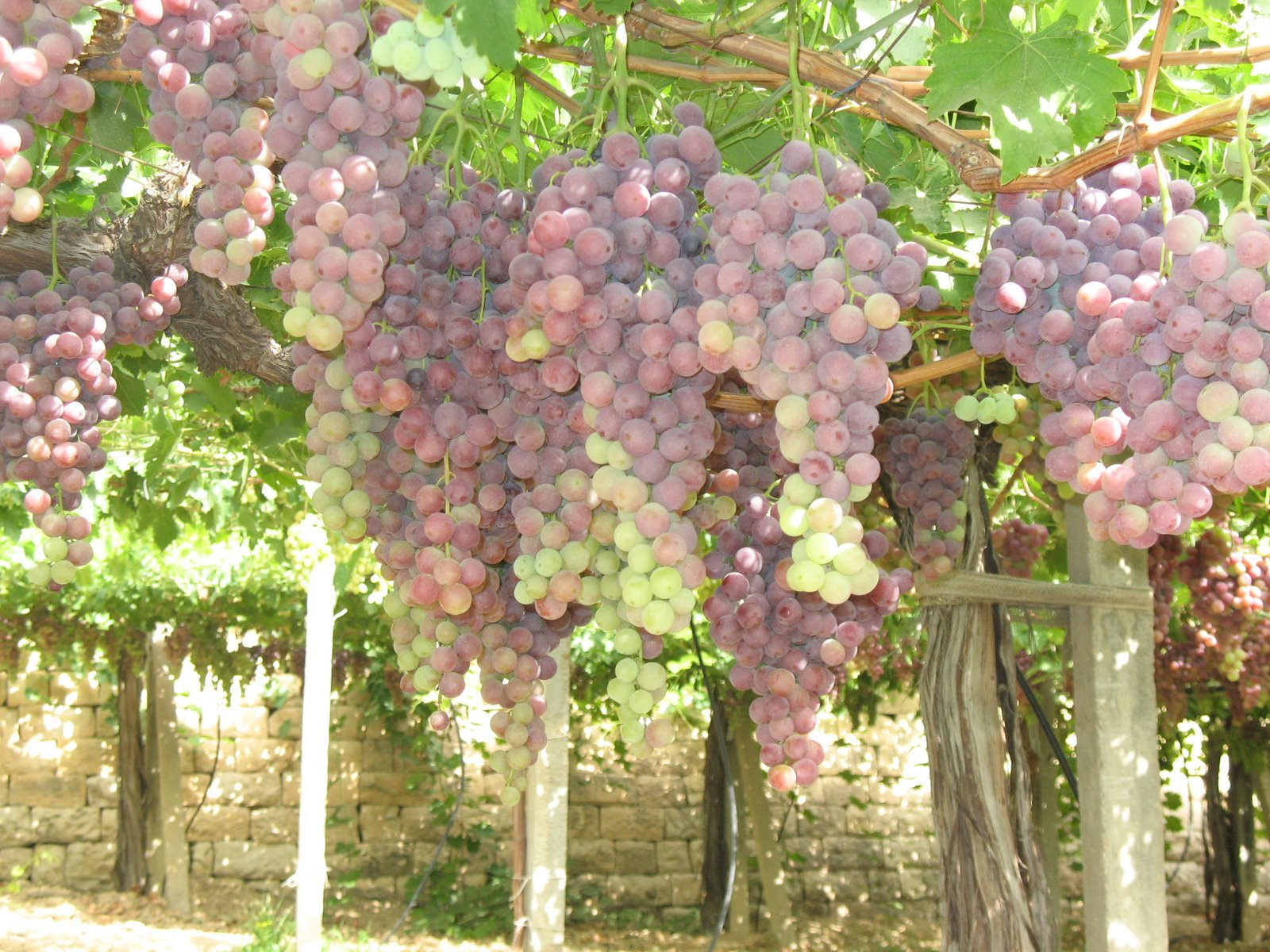
Zahlé grapes

Being the main town of the Beqaa Valley, Lebanon's most important agricultural region, the economy of Zahlé has long been built on agriculture. Grapes are the area's chief product, with vineyards forming a prominent feature of the surrounding landscape. Vines are also individually grown on lattice, on many of the older houses' terraces. A sizable part of the local produce supplies the three wineries present in and around the town, and the numerous distilleries producing arak, the local liquor which Zahlé is famous for.

Zahlé saw at a time a prosperous commercial activity due to its location midway between Beirut and Damascus. Paradoxically, it regained some of that activity during the civil war, when the growing instability in Beirut led to a decentralization of the economy. Furthermore, taxation was nonexistent due to the collapse of State authority, which Zahlé took advantage of to expand its industrial and commercial sectors.

A number of companies and state bodies have their headquarters for the Beqaa region in Zahlé, including the Central Bank of Lebanon and the Lebanese Chamber of Commerce.

== Education ==
Zahlé is evolving into a regional center of higher education, after many universities have opened branches there in recent years. Institutes of higher education currently represented in the town include:

- Lebanese University
- Saint Joseph University
- Holy Spirit University of Kaslik
- Antonine University
- American University of Science and Technology
- The National Technical Institute

== Transportation ==
Zahlé is connected to Beirut (55 kilometres (34 mi) to the west), and from there to all coastal cities, through the Beirut-Damascus road, which passes to the southwest of the urban area. The journey can take anywhere from 45 minutes to 2 hours, depending on the traffic. Damascus, Syria, is 73 km (45 mi) to the southeast, and is normally reached within one-and-a-half hours, excluding the waiting time at the border. Despite continuously undergoing works and repairs, the Beirut-Damascus road remains in poor condition, and is due to be replaced by a new, multimillion-dollar highway as the main international route; however, the completion date is still unclear.

Zahlé is also connected to Baalbek (36 km (22 mi) to the northeast) by the trans-Beqaa road, which continues further north towards Homs, Syria.

Due to widespread car ownership, public transportation remains underdeveloped. There is a single bus line, which runs on the central avenue at rather irregular times. Interurban transportation is done by minivans, which stop on the Manara roundabout at the town's entrance. Zahlé's railway station was located in Muallaqa, but was abandoned after all rail transport in Lebanon stopped during the civil war.

There were plans to convert the nearby Rayak Air Base (located 10 km (6 mi) to the East of Zahlé), into a civil airport serving the town and the whole valley. A regional airport could prove vital when the road to Beirut is closed because of heavy snowfall. However, the project froze in the early 2000s, after the runway extension had been initiated.

== Main sights ==
=== Berdawni Promenade ===
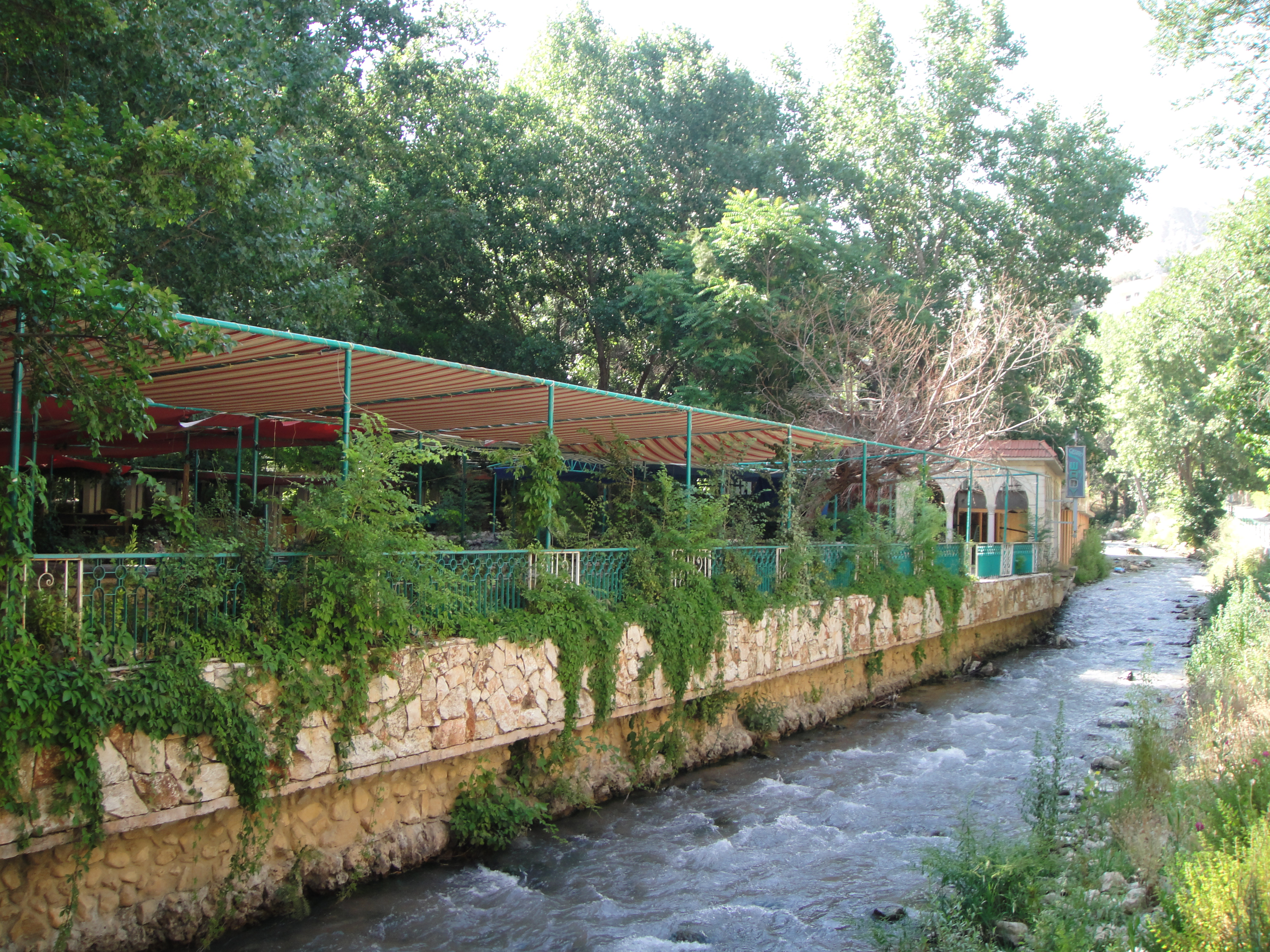
Cafes along the Berdawni River

The banks of the Berdawni River have long been a place where people of Zahlé and other parts of Lebanon come to socialize. The town's most popular attraction is a 300-metre (984 ft) promenade along the river, referred to as "Al Wadi" ("the valley"). Sheltered between the ravine's limestone cliffs, it is lined up with large outdoor restaurants, cafes and playrooms, and shaded by trees. These restaurants specialize in traditional Lebanese meze served with arak. The promenade is closed during late fall and winter, when cold winds from the mountain sweep through the ravine.

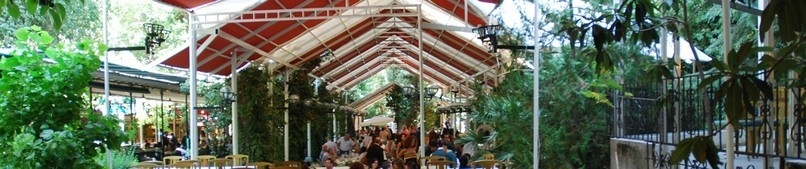
A Lebanese restaurant

=== Our Lady of Zahlé and Bekaa ===
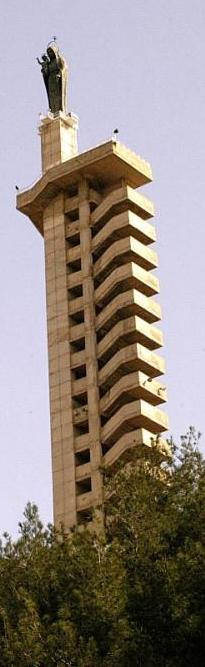
Our Lady of Zahlé and Bekaa. Taken in the 1970s

Located on a hilltop to the southwest of Zahlé, this is a 54-metre-high (177 ft) concrete tower, entirely clad in white marble, and topped with a 10-metre-tall (33 ft) bronze statue of the Virgin Mary, the work of an Italian artist. It is by far Zahlé's most prominent structure—visible from most of the city and from several miles around in the central Bekaa Valley. At its base is a chapel that can seat a little over a hundred people. The top of the tower features sweeping views over Zahlé and the Bekaa Valley.

=== Town Hall (Old Serail) ===
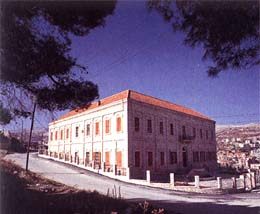
The Old Serail, turned into the prison of Zahlé in 1991, serves today as the town hall.

This Ottoman building was constructed in 1850 to serve as the town's Serail. Located just downhill from Our Lady of Zahlé and Bekaa, it is a mix of local and Ottoman architecture, and features an atrium occupied by an inner garden and surrounded by arcades. Though still known as "the Old Serail", it currently serves as the Town Hall. In the past, the ground floor used to house the local prison, which suffered of severe overcrowding and substandard conditions. The prison was transferred in 2009 to a new location in Muallaqa, with room for about 800 inmates and much more adequate infrastructure.

=== The Catholic Cathedral (Our Lady of Salvation) ===
This grandiose complex dates back to 1720, and consists of a series of stone-clad buildings around a large inner courtyard: the church itself (which is the oldest part), the seat of the Archbishop (a converted former monastery), and a small chapel housing an icon, which is said to be a reproduction of a portrait of the Virgin Mary by Saint Lucas. It also features a monumental entrance, an underground cemetery, and a 40-metre-high (130 ft) bell tower, atop of which a large marble clock was mounted in 1993. Part of the complex was destroyed by a bomb attack in April 1987, and rebuilt ever since.

=== Grand Hotel Kadri ===
The grand Hotel Kadri is a prime example of the traditional stone architecture of Zahlé, both in and out. It has long been used by most officials and dignitaries visiting the town, as its largest and most luxurious hotel. The Ottomans converted it to a hospital during World War I. During the Lebanese Civil War, it was occupied by Syrian troops and sustained enormous damage. An ambitious restoration project in the mid-1990s was able to bring it back to its former glory. The hotel closed in February 2011 due to a conflict between its direction and the Catholic Church (its effective owner since 1999) and reopened later in 2013.

=== Memshieh Park ===
Situated across the street from Grand Hotel Kadri, Memshieh is Zahlé's oldest and shadiest park (newly opened J.T.Skaff Park is larger, but contains considerably fewer trees). The park houses a collection of marble tables with mosaic depictions of several sites in Lebanon, a small pond with waterlilies, a semi-circular marble tholos, and several sculptures representing famous locals. In 2003, the municipality covered a 25 m (82 ft) fir (the park's tallest) with thousands of lights, in an attempt to break the world record for the largest natural Christmas tree.

=== Archaeological sites ===
Zahlé in itself offers little archaeological interest; however, the Château Ksara winery is worth a visit for its maze of vaults which dates back to Roman times. The suburb of Karak Nuh also features a curiosity: a 40-metre-long (131 ft) stone structure inside the local mosque, which local tradition believes to be the Tomb of Noah (but is probably a section of a Roman aqueduct).

Furthermore, there are several ancient sites of interest in nearby locations:

- In Qabb Ilyas (12 km (7 mi) to the southwest): rock sculptures of three deities that seem to be of Roman origin
- In Anjar (18 km (11 mi) to the south): the unique ruins of an Umayyad palace built following a Roman layout, using recycled Hellenistic and Roman material. The palace is classified as a World Heritage Site. A Roman temple also stands on a hilltop above nearby Majdel Anjar.
- Above the village of Furzol (8 km (5 mi) to the northwest): a series of rock-cut Roman tombs in the limestone cliffs
- In Niha (11 km (7 mi) to the northwest): two exquisite Roman temples bearing Phoenician architectural elements (just outside the village), and two others in need of restoration (higher up, in the area referred to as "the Fortress").

Two more sites worth visiting are a more distant trip away:

- Kamed al Lawz (32 km (20 mi) to the south) is the most important Bronze Age settlement in Lebanon, with finds from the Phoenician, Persian, Hellenistic, Roman and Byzantine periods having been uncovered as well.
- The Roman archaeological complex of Baalbek (another World Heritage Site) is located 36 km (22 mi) to the northwest.

== Culture ==
Zahlé's culture has long revolved around its signature crop, the grape, and its products, wine and arak. Arak, in particular, has traditionally been served in cafés at virtually any time of the day. The city is known as "the City of Wine and Poetry".

Zahlé's most important cultural event is the "Festival of the Vine", traditionally held each September, during which concerts, plays, poetry evenings and artistic exhibitions are organized daily over the course of two or three weeks. The final Saturday evening features the crowning of the "Maid of the Vine", the local beauty queen, and the next afternoon, the festival closes with arguably its most popular event: a parade of floats held on the town's main avenue.

The other central aspect of the local culture is religious devotion. Zahlé is still a Catholic and conservative town.

Prophet Elias (Elijah) is the town's patron saint, whose feast on July 20 is traditionally celebrated with fireworks. Another notable holiday is Corpus-Christi, celebrated on the first Thursday of June with a large-scale procession, with a torch-lit parade being held on the previous evening. The Corpus Christi celebration dates back to 1825, when the town was spared the ravages of bubonic plague.

== Climate ==
Zahlé has a Mediterranean climate (Köppen climate classification: Csa) with continental influences.

Climate data for Zahlé, elevation 920 m (3,020 ft), (1991–2020 normals, extremes 2015–2022)
Month	Jan	Feb	Mar	Apr	May	Jun	Jul	Aug	Sep	Oct	Nov	Dec	Year
Record high °C (°F)	24.0 (75.2)	25.1 (77.2)	26.5 (79.7)	33.7 (92.7)	37.6 (99.7)	37.2 (99.0)	39.5 (103.1)	41.0 (105.8)	44.3 (111.7)	36.1 (97.0)	30.8 (87.4)	23.0 (73.4)	44.3 (111.7)
Mean daily maximum °C (°F)	13.1 (55.6)	14.6 (58.3)	18.2 (64.8)	23.4 (74.1)	28.2 (82.8)	31.9 (89.4)	34.6 (94.3)	35.2 (95.4)	32.8 (91.0)	28.7 (83.7)	21.4 (70.5)	15.7 (60.3)	24.8 (76.7)
Daily mean °C (°F)	7.5 (45.5)	8.5 (47.3)	11.5 (52.7)	15.6 (60.1)	20.1 (68.2)	23.7 (74.7)	26.1 (79.0)	26.4 (79.5)	24.0 (75.2)	20.0 (68.0)	14.6 (58.3)	10.1 (50.2)	17.3 (63.2)
Mean daily minimum °C (°F)	1.8 (35.2)	2.4 (36.3)	4.8 (40.6)	7.7 (45.9)	12.0 (53.6)	15.4 (59.7)	17.6 (63.7)	17.5 (63.5)	15.1 (59.2)	11.3 (52.3)	7.7 (45.9)	4.4 (39.9)	9.8 (49.7)
Record low °C (°F)	−6.4 (20.5)	−0.9 (30.4)	0.1 (32.2)	1.5 (34.7)	6.2 (43.2)	9.4 (48.9)	13.9 (57.0)	14.8 (58.6)	10.5 (50.9)	9.2 (48.6)	0.7 (33.3)	−3.2 (26.2)	−6.4 (20.5)
Average precipitation mm (inches)	153.0 (6.02)	135.8 (5.35)	85.1 (3.35)	37.9 (1.49)	10.9 (0.43)	0.1 (0.00)	0.4 (0.02)	0.2 (0.01)	3.4 (0.13)	28.6 (1.13)	68.4 (2.69)	118.1 (4.65)	641.9 (25.27)
Average precipitation days (≥ 1.0 mm)	11.9	9.9	9.1	5.3	2.2	0.0	0.1	0.0	0.9	4.4	6.8	10.4	61
Source 1: Meteostat
Source 2: Starlings Roost Weather

== People ==
- Shakira, Colombian-Lebanese Singer
- Said Akl, poet, philosopher and politician
- Fouad El Turk, poet, former Lebanese ambassador to the United Nations and head of the Forum of Lebanese Ambassadors
- Charles Elachi (from nearby Riyaq), director of the Jet Propulsion Laboratory in NASA
- Elias Hrawi, president of Lebanon 1989–1998
- Joseph Raya, Melkite Greek Catholic archbishop and civil rights activist
- Louis Khalil, Lebanese priest of the Maronite Church
- Tom Barrack, Lebanese-American investor and diplomat
- Najwa Karam, Lebanese singer and actress
- Wael Kfoury, Lebanese singer and actor
- Isabel Bayrakdarian, Armenian-Canadian operatic soprano
- Karl Sharro, Lebanese-Iraqi architect and writer based in London
- Mário Zagallo, Brazilian footballer and manager, is of Lebanese ancestry from Zahlé
- Khalil Khamis (born 1995), Lebanese footballer

== Twin towns – sister cities ==
Zahlé is twinned with:

- Bordeaux, France, since 2006
