= Saadnayel =

Saadnayel سعدنايل
- Town
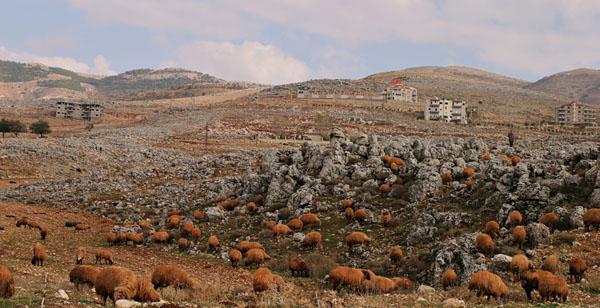

- Location in Lebanon
- Coordinates: 33°49′12″N 35°52′58″E
- Country: Lebanon
- Governorate: Beqaa Governorate
- District: Zahlé
- Elevation: 2,990 ft (910 m)
- Time zone: UTC+2 (EET)
  - Summer (DST): +3

Saadnayel (Arabic: سعدنايل, romanized: Saʿdnāyil) is a town in the Bekaa Valley in the Zahlé District of Lebanon. It has a population of around 20,000 Lebanese, mostly Sunni Muslims.

Saadnayel lies 47 kilometres (29 mi) from Beirut. The town is located strategically near the crossroads between the Beirut-Damascus highway and the main road connecting the northern and southern Beqaa.

== History ==
In 1838, Eli Smith noted Saadnayel's population being Sunni Muslim.

During the outbreak of the Lebanese Civil War in 1975, Saadnayel’s strategic position on the Beirut–Damascus highway made it a critical military objective for the Lebanese National Movement (LNM) and its Palestinian allies. In late 1975, the town became a site of intense sectarian friction, culminating in a series of extrajudicial killings and "identity card" massacres at checkpoints. A key trigger for the August 1975 escalation in the central Beqaa was the death of a Syrian national in Saadnayel, which led to retaliatory violence and the systematic targeting of civilians based on sectarian identity. These events were aimed at controlling the transit of personnel and supplies, effectively isolating Christian enclaves such as Zahle.

In 1976, Saadnayel served as a primary staging area for LNM and PLO artillery during the prolonged Siege of Zahle (1976). The town’s history during this period is marked by its transition into a fortified military zone, which led to the displacement of much of its original mixed population. The consolidation of militia control in Saadnayel during 1976 forensically altered the demographic landscape of the central Beqaa, creating a permanent sectarian "frontier" that persisted throughout the conflict.

Following the 1976 intervention, Saadnayel's role evolved as the Syrian military consolidated its presence in the Beqaa Valley. By 1978, the town became a vital logistical link between the Syrian command in Chtaura and the front lines surrounding Zahle. This period saw the permanent establishment of military intelligence hubs and the formalization of the town as a stronghold for Syrian-aligned factions. These developments effectively finalized the demographic and political transformation of the town, transitioning it from a contested transit point into a central pillar of the Syrian-led security architecture in Lebanon that would persist until the 2005 withdrawal.

The town has been the site of sporadic Sunni-Shia violence. In 2008, four individuals were wounded in armed clashes between anti-Syrian majority supporters and Hezbollah-led opposition in Lebanon; the clashes involved use of machine guns, mortars, and rockets in Saadnayel. Despite the army's presence, they did not intervene.

Up to 35,000 refugees of the Syrian Civil War have also settled in the town.

== See Also ==
- List of extrajudicial killings and political violence in Lebanon

== Bibliography ==
- Robinson, E.; Smith, E. (1841). Biblical Researches in Palestine, Mount Sinai and Arabia Petraea: A Journal of Travels in the year 1838. Vol. 3. Boston: Crocker & Brewster.
