= Taanayel =

Taanayel تعنايل
- Village
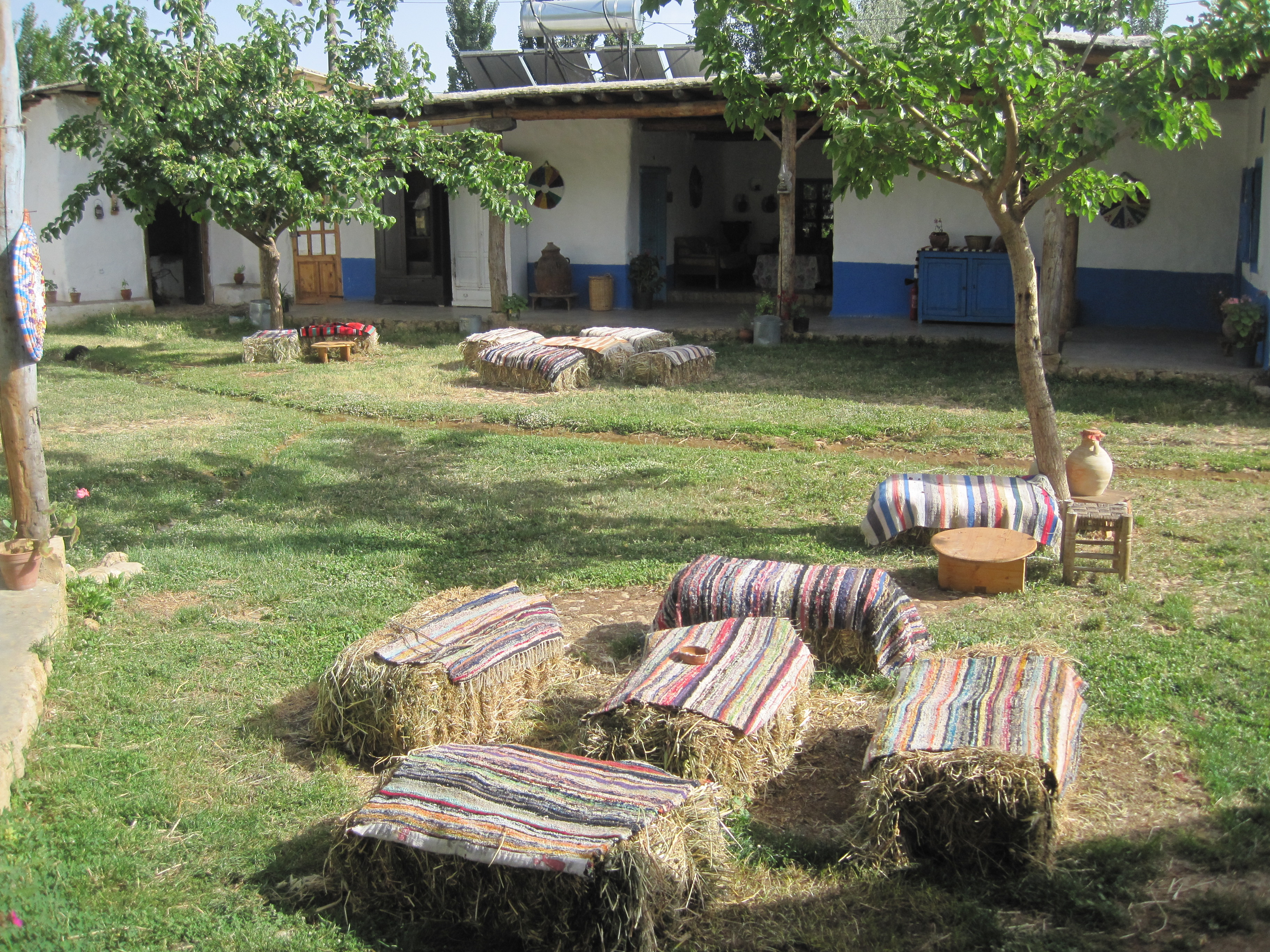
- Taanayel village, 2013

- Location in Lebanon
- Coordinates: 33°47′59″N 35°52′08″E
- Country: Lebanon
- Governorate: Beqaa Governorate
- District: Zahlé
- Elevation: 2,720 ft (830 m)
- Time zone: UTC+2 (EET)
  - Summer (DST): +3

Taanayel (Levantine Arabic: تعنايل, romanized: Taʿnāyel), also transliterated Tanayal, is a village located in the Zahlé District of the Beqaa Governorate in Lebanon.

== History ==
In 1838, Eli Smith noted Tha'nayil as a Sunni Muslim village in the Beqaa Valley.

In 1982, Taanayel suffered heavy damages from aerial bombardments.

In October 1985, war planes of the Israeli Air Force (IAF) dropped bombs and fired rockets on a target near Tanayel on the Beirut-Damascus highway. According to UPI, the command of the Israel Defense Forces (IDF) said that the place was used as a military base by Ahmed Jibril's pro-Syrian Popular Front for the Liberation of Palestine-General Command.

Tannayal farm (from the Aramaic word for "the Grace of God") lies a few kilometers south from Chtaura on the main road. Following the massacre of French Jesuit missionnaries in 1860 an estate was given by the Ottoman authorities. The place has been converted to a farm and retreat centre in Ignatian spirituality since that date

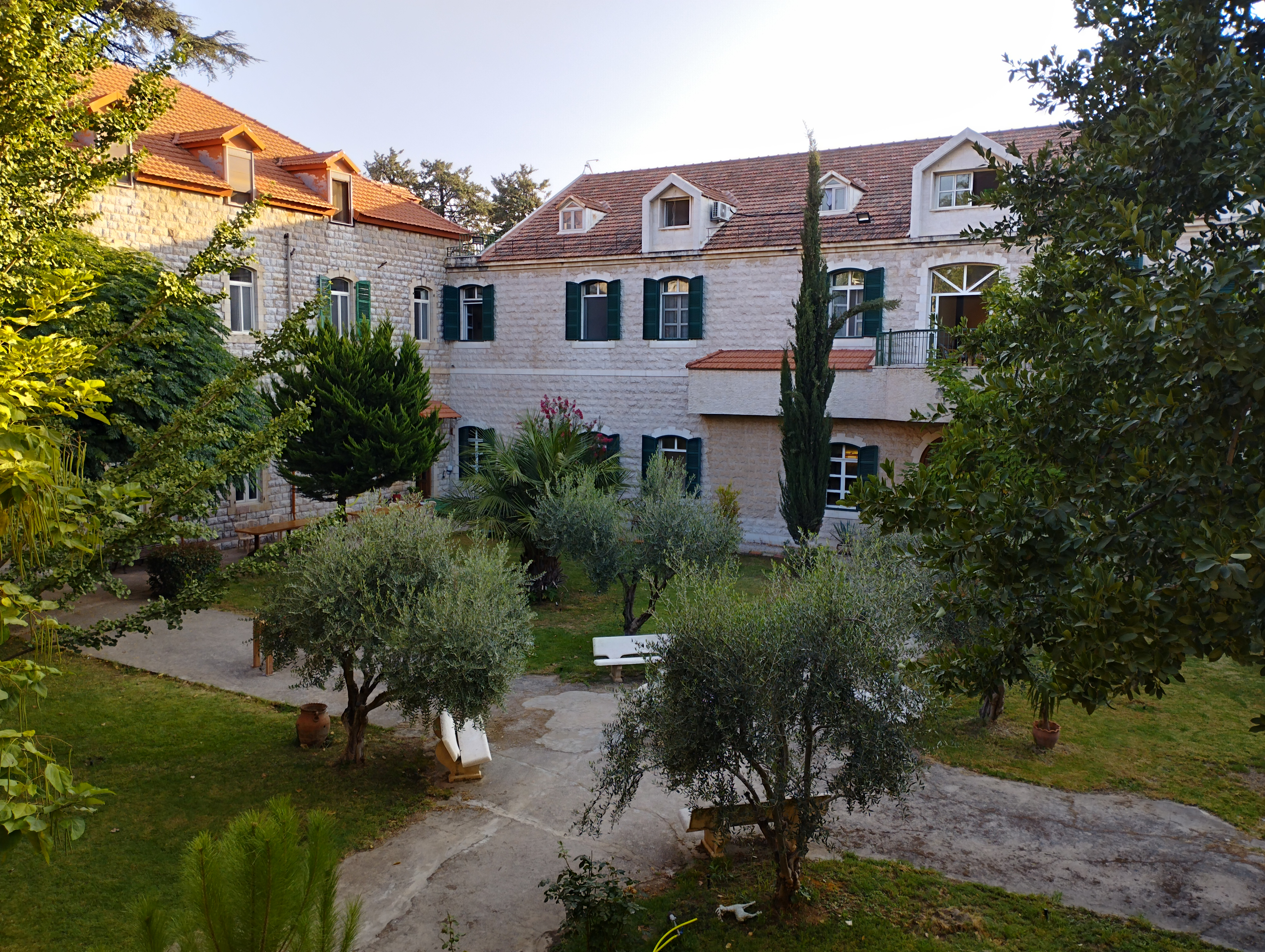
Jesuit spiritual center

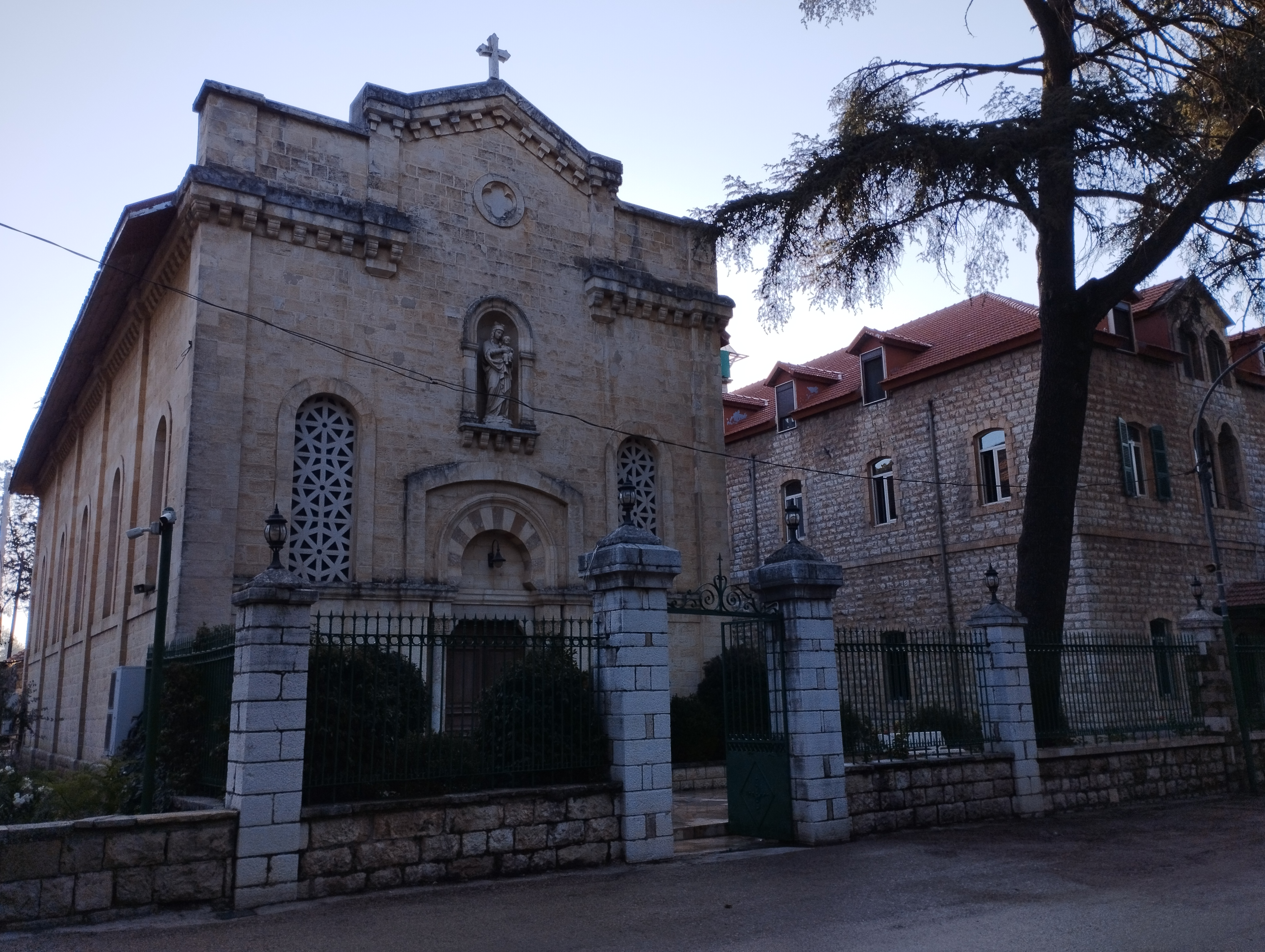
Jesuit spiritual center chapel

.

It is now a working farm entrusted to Arcenciel and also serves as a teaching facility for the Faculty of Agriculture at Saint Joseph University located in Beirut.

== Bibliography ==
- Robinson, E.; Smith, E. (1841). Biblical Researches in Palestine, Mount Sinai and Arabia Petraea: A Journal of Travels in the year 1838. Vol. 3. Boston: Crocker & Brewster.
