= Louis Khalil =

Lebanese priest

Reverend Chorbishop Louis Khalil (Arabic: لويس خليل) was an educated Lebanese priest of the Maronite Church. Louis Khalil was of Lebanese descent, born in Zahlé, Lebanon. His mother, Elmaz Zalzal (Arabic: إلماس زلزل) was a descendant of a Lebanese aristocratic family. His father was a shell product and petrol distributor in Beqaa.

== Early life ==
On July 25, 1936, Maronite priest Louis Khalil published the booklet Al-Hizb al-Suri al-Qawmi Mu’amarah ‘ala al-Din wa al-Watan (Arabic: الحزب السوري القومي مؤامرة على الدين والوطن) which means The Syrian National Party: a Conspiracy Against Religion and Country.

In it, he stated numerous accusations against the Syrian National Party and its leader. He did so with the approval of the Maronite Patriarch ‘Arida. "This is the Syrian National Party," he wrote, "a secret sect endeavoring to dissolve the Holy Church and every religion as well as ethics and Lebanon." He also argued that the principles of the Syrian National Party are against the Lebanese homeland and religion, especially Christianity.

Louis Khalil's brother, Fouad Abou Takka, was a General Officer in the Lebanese army. He and General Henri Gouraud rearranged the map by drawing borders between Lebanon and Syria, thus announcing Lebanon an independent country. Due to General Abou Takka's connection to General Gouraud and Monsignor Khalil's repeated accusations against the Syrian National Party, Fawzi Abou Takka, their brother, was abducted by the SSNP and was transported and jailed in Syria where he was tortured until his kidneys failed. Fawzi was sent back to Lebanon where he died.

== Campaign against Sa'adeh ==
Khalil continued his campaign against Sa’adeh for a number of years through al-Bashir, a paper sponsored by the Jesuits which on many occasions engaged in squabbles with the SSNP’s paper an-Nahda.

== Reform principles ==
Khalil tried to substantiate his argument by refuting the reform principles of the SSNP. In his opinion, the SSNP was a conspiracy against religion mainly because it advocated in its first reform principle “separation of religion and state.” As he said it, “Separation of religion and state is not only a sin against God, but also a crime against the state, causing its destruction.”

The fourth and fifth reform principles constituted his justification for accusing the SSNP of being a conspiracy against Lebanon. In his fourth reform principle, Sa’adeh, the priest explained, wanted to abolish feudalism and establish Lebanon’s economy on the basis of socialism. “In our country, we do not have feudalism...,” the priest maintained, adding, “We would like to draw the attention of Christians to the fact that the Church has pronounced the principle of socialism as corrupt and contradictory to natural and divine laws...” In his fifth principle, Sa’adeh, the priest alleged, wanted to establish a strong army so he could disobey the legitimate civil authorities. The priest emphasized that “the authority of the Mandate is genuine. It has been founded by the Allies who have liberated us with their blood and resources. Thus, this authority is a legitimate one and should not be challenged.”

In the eyes of Louis Khalil, Sa’adeh had committed a “horrible sin” when he challenged the Mandate authorities and called for reclaiming the sovereignty of the nation. Consequently, his party had to be disallowed and membership in it forbidden by the Maronite Church. “Any Christian, or rather any man endowed with reason, should not join this party the SSNP...,” Khalil warned.
