= Kneisseh =

Kneisseh (Baalbek) الكنيسه (بعلبك)
- Village
- Location in Lebanon
- Coordinates: 34°06′58″N 36°09′56″E
- Country: Lebanon
- Governorate: Baalbek-Hermel Governorate
- District: Baalbek District
- Elevation: 1,000 m (3,300 ft)
- Time zone: UTC+2 (EET)
  - Summer (DST): +3

Kneisseh (Baalbek) (Arabic: الكنيسه (بعلبك)) is a local authority in the Baalbek District of the Baalbek-Hermel Governorate in Lebanon.

== History ==
In 1838, Eli Smith noted el-Kuneiyiseh's population as being predominantly Metawileh.

== Bibliography ==
- Robinson, E.; Smith, E. (1841). Biblical Researches in Palestine, Mount Sinai and Arabia Petraea: A Journal of Travels in the year 1838. Vol. 3. Boston: Crocker & Brewster.
