= Zahlé District =

Coordinates: 33.8468°N 35.8976°E

Zahlé
- District
- قضاء زحلة
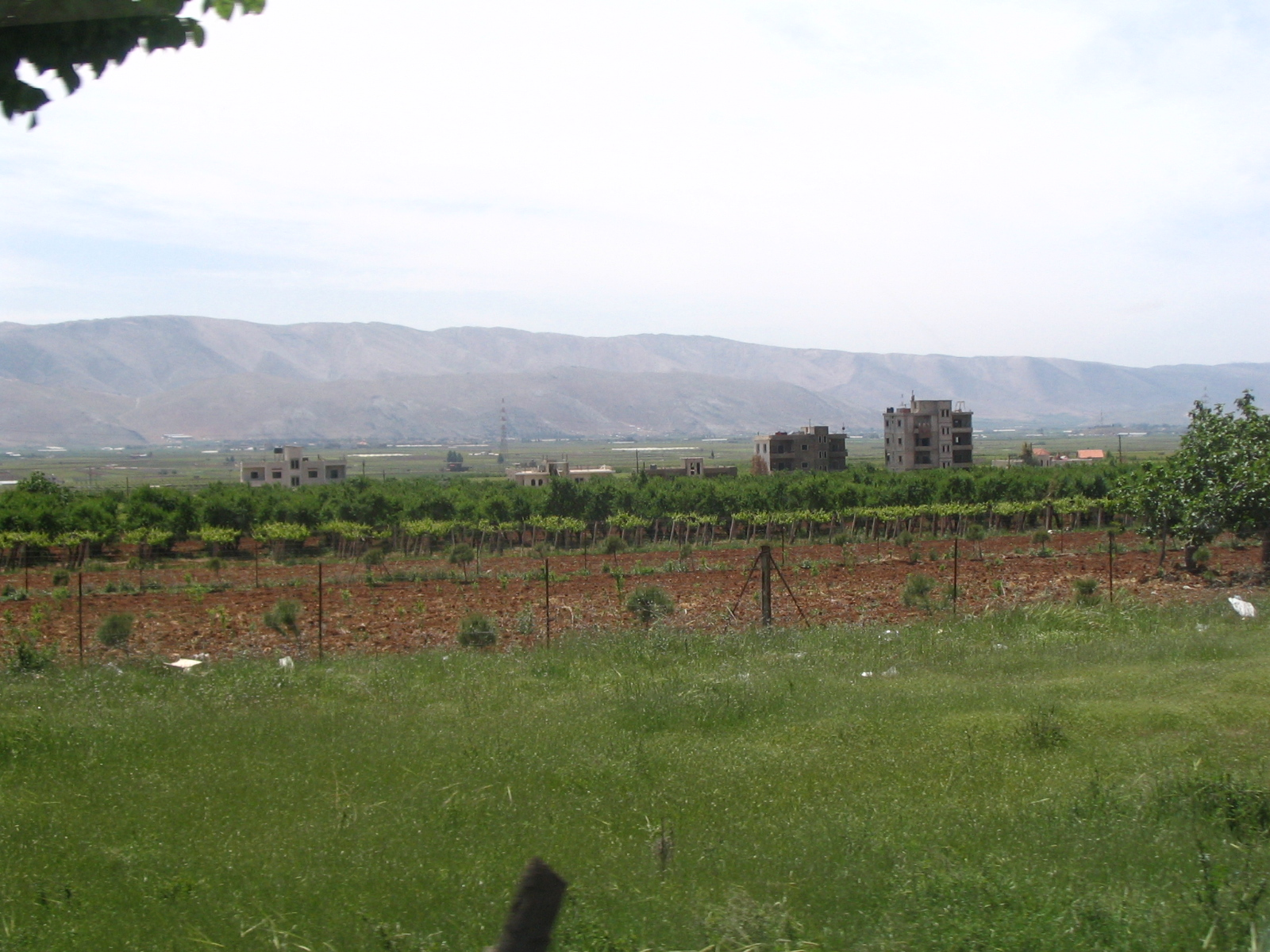
- Vineyards

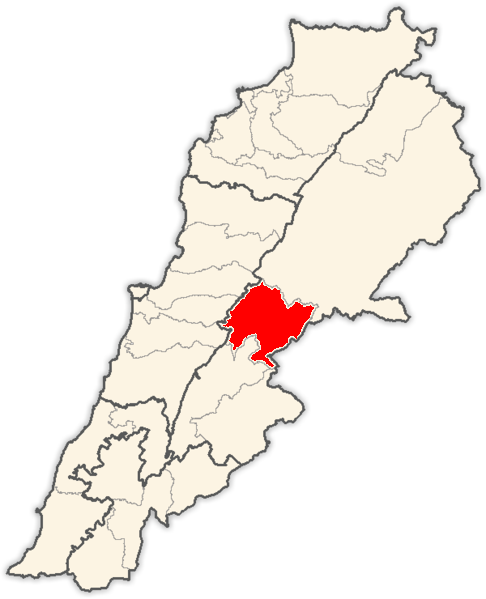
- Location in Lebanon
- Country: Lebanon
- Capital: Zahlé

Area
  - Total: 164 sq mi (425 km^{2})

Population
  - Estimate (31 December 2017): 336,382
  - Ethnicities= Lebanese density: 3,050/sq mi (1,176/km^{2})
- Time zone: UTC+2 (EET)
  - Summer (DST): UTC+3 (EEST)

Zahlé District (Arabic: قضاء زحلة) is an administrative district of the Beqaa Governorate of the Republic of Lebanon. Its capital and largest town is the town of the same name. A reed-roofed town set among the eastern foothills of Mount Sannine. Zahlé was founded about 300 years ago in an area whose human habitation dates back some five millennia.

== Main cities and towns ==
- Ali an Nahri
- Anjar (Hawsh Mousa)
- Barelias
- Jdita
- Majdal Anjar
- Qâa er Rîm
- Qabb Ilyas - Wadi el Deloum
- Rayaq - Haouch Hala
- Saadnayel
- Taalabaya
- Zahlé - Maalaka

== Other settlements ==
- Ablah
- Ain Kfar Zabad
- Bouarij
- Chtaura
- Dalhamiye
- Deir el Ghazal
- Ferzol
- Haoush el Ghanam
- Haoush Hala
- Hay el Fikani
- Hezerta
- Kfar Zabad
- Makse
- Masa
- Mrayjat
- Nabi Ayla
- Nasriyet Rizk
- Niha Bekaa
- Qousaya
- Raait
- Taanayel
- Tal Amara
- Terbol

== Demographics ==
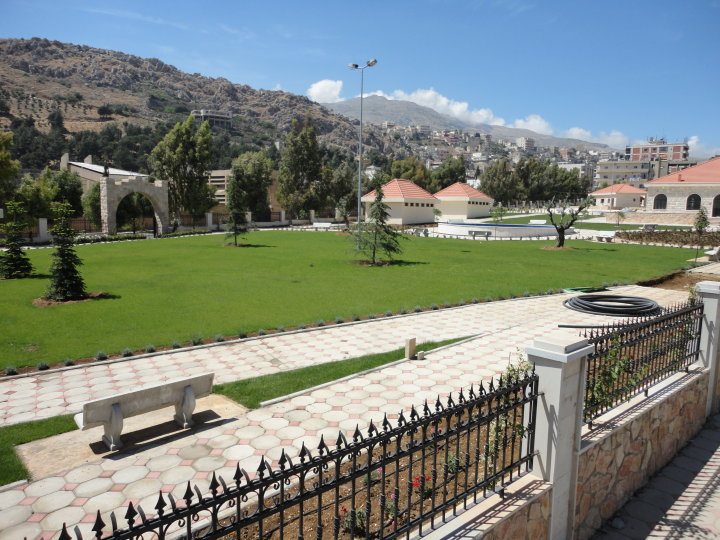
Kabelias municipal garden, Zahlé District

The Zahlé district is one of the most diverse regions in Lebanon. The area is also home to a modest Armenian Orthodox and Catholic population, who have historically resided near the Anjar area of the district.

Year	Christians								Muslims				Druze
Year	Total	Greek Catholics	Maronites	Greek Orthodox	Armenian Orthodox	Syriac Orthodox	Armenian Catholics	Other Christians	Total	Sunnis	Shias	Alawites	Druze
2014	55.95%	17.79%	16.70%	9.91%	5.25%	3.07%	1.07%	2.16%	43.12%	27.49%	15.62%	0.01%	0.53%
2022	56.81%	18.90%	17.31%	10.92%	4.99%	—N/a	1.11%	3.58%	42.73%	26.58%	16.15%	0.00%	0.46%
2026	51.20%	17.46%	14.9%	8.89%	4.22%	—N/a	0.92%	4.81%	48.27%	31.19%	17.08%	0.00%	0.53%

== See also ==
- 2011 Estonian cyclists abduction
