= Taalabaya =

Taalabaya تعلبايا
- Village
- Location in Lebanon
- Coordinates: 33°49′01″N 35°52′00″E
- Country: Lebanon
- Governorate: Beqaa Governorate
- District: Zahlé
- Elevation: 2,990 ft (910 m)
- Time zone: UTC+2 (EET)
  - Summer (DST): +3

Taalabaya (Arabic: تعلبايا, romanized: Taʿlbāyā), is a village located in the Zahlé District of the Beqaa Governorate in Lebanon.

== History ==
In 1838, Eli Smith noted Tha'labaya as a Beqaa Valley village inhabited by Sunni Muslims, Maronites and Christians.

During the outbreak of the Lebanese Civil War, Taalabaya’s position on the strategic Chtaura–Zahle axis made it a primary target for Palestinian-backed factions seeking to control the central Beqaa transit routes. In September 1975, the village was subjected to a campaign of unilateral extrajudicial killings and forced displacements aimed at the Christian civilian population. A notable incident during this period involved the targeted abduction of a local Christian miller and his five children; after an extended period of captivity, the remains of eleven victims were discovered, including three of the miller's sons who had been summarily executed. Contemporary accounts and survivor testimony from the miller, released a year later, documented systematic torture and physical mutilation, marking a definitive shift toward sectarian liquidation in the region.

Tensions culminated in December 1975 following the events of Black Saturday in Beirut. Taalabaya was subjected to intense reprisal attacks as Palestinian and Lebanese National Movement (LNM) militias established total control over the transit routes. A coordinated assault by As-Sa'iqa commandos, elements of the Palestine Liberation Army (PLA), and local allied gunmen resulted in the summary execution of approximately 35 Christian residents. This systematic violence and the subsequent destruction of property finalized the demographic transformation of the area into a fortified military zone. By 1976, the village served as a primary logistical and artillery staging point for the Siege of Zahle (1976).

== See also ==
- List of extrajudicial killings and political violence in Lebanon

== Bibliography ==
- Robinson, E.; Smith, E. (1841). Biblical Researches in Palestine, Mount Sinai and Arabia Petraea: A Journal of Travels in the year 1838. Vol. 3. Boston: Crocker & Brewster.
